= 2026 Election Day floods =

2026 flash flood event in Florida, United States

- Clockwise from top: Flooding in Vero Lake Estates; Flooded streets in Sebastian; St. Sebastian River overflowing its banks in Roseland

Meteorological history
- Duration: November 1–7, 2026 (7 days)

Flood
- Max. rainfall: 24.69 inches (627 mm) in Malabar, Florida

Overall effects
- Fatalities: 2 total
- Damage: >$100 million (2026 USD)
- Areas affected: East Central Florida (Particularly Brevard County, Indian River County, and St. Lucie County); South Florida, Florida Heartland

The Election Day Floods, was a historic flash flood event that struck Florida after record-breaking rainfall hit the state. East Central Florida was the hardest hit, where 24 inches (610 mm) of rain fell in Malabar in 24 hours. This excessive rainfall triggered widespread flooding in the state, and prompted a flash flood emergency for Palm Bay. Two people were killed in Brevard County during the event.

The floods occurred during the 2026 United States elections, which caused numerous polling locations in at least eight counties to be relocated.

Initial estimates by AccuWeather estimated total damage and economic loss from the event to reach $3 billion to $5 billion (2026 USD). Aon plc estimated losses to exceed $100 million (2026 USD).

== Impact ==
Governor Ron DeSantis declared a state of emergency for Brevard, Indian River, St. Lucie, Martin, Highlands, DeSoto, and Hardee Counties on November 2. All Indian River State College campuses were closed early on November 2, and remained closed on November 3. On November 3, the state of emergency was expanded to include Hendry, Palm Beach, Glades, Okeechobee, Volusia, Seminole, and Lake Counties.

=== Brevard County ===
Brevard County Schools were shut down on Monday, November 2, and were reopened on Thursday, November 5. Shelters in the county opened at the Wickham Park Senior Center in Melbourne and the South Mainland Community Center in Micco. Eight voting precincts in Brevard County were relocated on November 3 as a result of flooded roads.

Flooding in Grant-Valkaria on November 2

==== Palm Bay ====
In Palm Bay, a boil water advisory was issued due to contaminated drinking water following the floods. The Veterans Day Parade, initially scheduled for November 7, was canceled due to flooded streets. A shelter-in-place advisory was issued, and five high water rescue vehicles were deployed to the city.

A large sinkhole opened up in the Palm Bay Estates community, destroying the main road in the neighborhood. A nearby home's foundation was washed away by the floodwaters; the home was destroyed in the resulting fire. Port Malabar Blvd was washed away by floodwaters. A water main broke on the road, which worsened the flooding and temporarily cut off water supply to local residents. Significant flooding in residential neighborhoods led to the displacement of several households. Fallon Blvd near Ladner Road was destroyed and washed away by floodwaters, washing away multiple vehicles. Several septic tanks in the city burst, prompting a flood safety warning for the area. Multiple bridges over Turkey Creek were washed away when the creek overflowed its banks into the surrounding neighborhood. A canal in the city breached and flooded multiple homes. Sixteen city emergency management vehicles were destroyed during the floods. Significant flooding was reported in the Bayside Lakes neighborhood, where 20.33 inches (516 mm) of rain was recorded.

At least 60 people were rescued in the city, according to the Florida Fish and Wildlife Conservation Commission. Several high water rescues took place by helicopter and airboat. A 34-year-old man was killed when he became trapped in his vehicle in floodwaters. A 78-year-old man was also killed by flooding.

==== Melbourne ====
Melbourne recorded 11.51 inches (292 mm) of rain on November 2, which became the wettest day in the city's history since records began in 1937, surpassing the previous record of 10.23 inches (260 mm) set by Hurricane Irma in 2017. A boil water advisory was issued for the city following the floods.

A high water rescue took place in West Melbourne when a driver became trapped in their stalled vehicle. Flooding at the intersection of Sarno Road and Wickham Road led to multiple stalled vehicles. Street flooding was reported in Indian Harbour Beach. Heavy flooding occurred at Gleason Park in the city.

=== Indian River County ===
A state of emergency was declared for the county on November 2. Indian River County Schools were dismissed early on Monday, November 2, and remained closed through Friday, November 6. Two shelters in the county opened at Sebastian River Middle School and Osceola Magnet School. Over 31 roads were closed throughout the county due to flooding. At least 20 people required rescue from flooded vehicles in the county, though no fatalities were reported.

==== Sebastian ====
Washed away section of Wimbrow Drive on November 3

In Sebastian, 14.48 inches (368 mm) of rain fell, leading to heavy flooding, road closures, and multiple water rescues. SR 512 was closed numerous times due to heavy flooding and stalled vehicles. A portion of Wimbrow Drive was partly washed away near Sebastian Municipal Airport. Sebastian Municipal Golf Course was closed on November 3 due to flooding. GoLine, the regional bus system, temporarily suspended service along Route 5, which runs through the city.

The St. Sebastian River, which runs through the city, overflowed its banks and flooded nearby communities.

==== Vero Lake Estates ====
Vero Lake Estates was severely impacted by flooding. Vehicles were carried away by fast-moving floodwaters, and water entered homes.

=== St. Lucie County ===
A local state of emergency was declared for St. Lucie County on November 2. Rainfall totals in the county peaked at 16.70 inches (424 mm) in Port St. Lucie, and 13.73 inches (349 mm) of rain was measured in Fort Pierce.

=== Florida Heartland ===
==== Highlands County ====
A local state of emergency was issued for Highlands County on November 3. Avon Park recorded the highest rainfall totals in the county, with a measurement of 12.34 inches (313 mm). Sebring Regional Airport recorded 11.49 inches (292 mm) of rain during the event.

Floodwaters entered mobile homes in Sebring, after a nearby creek overflowed into the neighborhood. The Highlands County Humane Society experienced significant flood damage. Following a dike breach on November 2 in Lake Placid, over 90 acres of cropland was flooded and destroyed. The breach also washed away portions of Abell Road, trapping residents. The situation was further complicated when Lake Istokpoga overflowed in the area, surrounding nearby homes.

At least 240 customers in Highlands County lost power. On November 3, polling stations for election day were relocated due to flooding, affecting over 2,000 local residents. At least 11 roads were closed across Highlands County.

==== DeSoto County ====
DeSoto County Schools were closed on November 3 and 4 due to flooding.

The Peace River in Arcadia reached major flood stage on November 5, flooding nearby homes.

=== Elsewhere ===
Brightline temporarily suspended service between West Palm Beach and Orlando following the floods.

== Aftermath ==
On November 5, the Palm Bay City Manager Matthew Morton stated in a city council meeting that damages to roads and bridges in the city would exceed $10 million (2026 USD).

The Red Cross assisted in relief efforts in Palm Bay, where meals were provided to residents affected by the flooding. A shelter for residents displaced by flooding in Palm Bay was opened in Cocoa, operated by Red Cross and Brevard County Emergency Management. The organization also opened a shelter at the Wickham Park Senior Center in Melbourne. Space Coast United Way also assisted in the relief efforts in Palm Bay.

== See also ==
- 2023 Fort Lauderdale floods
- November 2023 Central Florida floods
