= Indian River Shores, Florida =

Town in the state of Florida, United States

- Town
- Town of Indian River Shores
- Location in Indian River County and the state of Florida
- Coordinates: 27°41′45″N 80°22′35″W
- Country: United States
- State: Florida
- County: Indian River
- Settled (John's Island): 1872–1880
- Incorporated (Town of Indian River Shores): June 11, 1953

Government
  - Type: Council-Manager
  - Mayor: Brian T. Foley
  - Vice Mayor: Robert "Bob" F. Auwaerter
  - Councilmembers: Peter A. Tedesko, James M. Altieri, and Jesse L. "Sam" Carroll, Jr.
  - Town Manager: James Harpring
  - Town Clerk: Janice C. Rutan

Area
  - Total: 7.24 sq mi (18.75 km^{2})
  - Land: 5.12 sq mi (13.27 km^{2})
  - Water: 2.12 sq mi (5.48 km^{2})
- Elevation: 0 ft (0 m)

Population (2020)
  - Total: 4,241
  - Density: 827.7/sq mi (319.57/km^{2})
- Time zone: UTC-5 (Eastern (EST))
  - Summer (DST): UTC-4 (EDT)
- ZIP code: 32963
- Area code: 772
- FIPS code: 12-33600
- GNIS feature ID: 2405885
- Website: irshores.com

Indian River Shores is a town in Indian River County, Florida, United States. As of the 2020 census, the town has a population of 4,241. Located on Orchid Island, a barrier island separating the Atlantic Ocean and the Indian River Lagoon, Indian River Shores is situated along the oceanfront directly north of Vero Beach.

Indian River Shores predominantly consists of gated, low-density residential communities, with Florida State Road A1A serving as the main public roadway. The population nearly doubles from October until Easter.

The Town of Indian River Shores is part of the Sebastian-Vero Beach-West Vero Corridor Metropolitan Area, which is also the northernmost part of the South Florida Combined Statistical Area.

== Geography ==
Indian River Shores is located in eastern Indian River County and is bordered to the north by Wabasso Beach; to the south by Vero Beach; to the west, across the Indian River, by Winter Beach and Gifford; and to the east by the Atlantic Ocean.

According to the United States Census Bureau, the town has a total area of 7.3 square miles (18.8 km^{2}), of which 5.1 square miles (13.3 km^{2}) are land and 2.1 square miles (5.5 km^{2}), or 29.44%, are water.

=== Climate ===
Indian River Shores is part of the humid subtropical climate zone, with a Köppen Climate Classification of "Cfa" (C = mild temperate, f = fully humid, and a = hot summer)

== Demographics ==
Historical population
Census	Pop.	Note	%±
1960	19		—
1970	76		300.0%
1980	1,254		1,550.0%
1990	2,278		81.7%
2000	3,448		51.4%
2010	3,901		13.1%
2020	4,241		8.7%
U.S. Decennial Census

=== Racial and ethnic composition ===
Indian River Shores racial composition (Hispanics excluded from racial categories) (NH = Non-Hispanic)
Race	Pop 2010	Pop 2020	% 2010	% 2020
White (NH)	3,793	4,008	97.23%	94.51%
Black or African American (NH)	11	14	0.28%	0.33%
Native American or Alaska Native (NH)	1	1	0.03%	0.02%
Asian (NH)	28	34	0.72%	0.80%
Pacific Islander or Native Hawaiian (NH)	1	0	0.03%	0.00%
Some other race (NH)	2	7	0.05%	0.17%
Two or more races/Multiracial (NH)	13	65	0.33%	1.53%
Hispanic or Latino (any race)	52	112	1.33%	2.64%
Total	3,901	4,241	100.00%	100.00%

The town ranked tenth in Florida places by per capita income as of 2022.

=== 2020 census ===
As of the 2020 census, Indian River Shores had a population of 4,241. The median age was 72.6 years. 3.3% of residents were under the age of 18 and 71.9% of residents were 65 years of age or older. For every 100 females there were 84.3 males, and for every 100 females age 18 and over there were 84.1 males age 18 and over.

As of 2020, 100.0% of residents lived in urban areas, while 0.0% lived in rural areas.

In 2020, there were 2,321 households in Indian River Shores, of which 4.5% had children under the age of 18 living in them. Of all households, 63.8% were married-couple households, 9.3% were households with a male householder and no spouse or partner present, and 24.4% were households with a female householder and no spouse or partner present. About 30.1% of all households were made up of individuals and 25.1% had someone living alone who was 65 years of age or older.

In 2020, there were 3,393 housing units, of which 31.6% were vacant. The homeowner vacancy rate was 3.6% and the rental vacancy rate was 27.1%.

According to the 2020 American Community Survey 5-year estimates, there were 2,170 households and 1,542 families residing in the town.

=== 2010 census ===
As of the 2010 United States census, there were 3,901 people, 2,200 households, and 1,401 families residing in the town.

=== 2000 census ===
As of the census of 2000, there were 3,448 people, 1,854 households, and 1,334 families residing in the town. The population density was 666.4 inhabitants per square mile (257.3/km^{2}). There were 2,881 housing units at an average density of 556.8 units per square mile (215.0 units/km^{2}). The racial makeup of the town was 98.72% White, 0.12% African American, 0.06% Native American, 0.67% Asian, and 0.44% from two or more races. Hispanic or Latino of any race were 0.84% of the population.

In 2000, there were 1,854 households, out of which 4.6% had children under the age of 18 living with them, 70.1% were married couples living together, 1.3% had a female householder with no husband present, and 28.0% were non-families. 26.8% of all households were made up of individuals, and 20.4% had someone living alone who was 65 years of age or older. The average household size was 1.86 and the average family size was 2.17.

In 2000, in the town, the population was spread out, with 4.9% under the age of 18, 1.0% from 18 to 24, 4.3% from 25 to 44, 26.9% from 45 to 64, and 62.9% who were 65 years of age or older. The median age was 69 years. For every 100 females, there were 85.5 males. For every 100 females age 18 and over, there were 85.1 males.

In 2000, the median income for a household in the town was $110,729, and the median income for a family was $141,952. Males had a median income of $100,000 versus $40,179 for females. The per capita income for the town was $102,511. About 1.5% of families and 2.2% of the population were below the poverty line, including none of those under age 18 and 2.9% of those age 65 or over.
