= X26 =

X26 or X-26 may refer to:

- X26 (New York City bus)
- London Buses route X26
- Sebastian Municipal Airport, Florida, United States
- Schweizer X-26 Frigate, an American experimental aircraft
- Taser X26, an electroshock weapon
- X.26, an international standard specifying the electrical characteristics of unbalanced circuit.
