= Oslo, Florida =

- Unincorporated community
- Location within Florida Location within the United States
- Coordinates: 27°35′12″N 80°22′49″W
- State: Florida
- County: Indian River
- Established: 1898
- Founder: Ole Olsen Helseth
- Elevation: 13 ft (4.0 m)
- Time zone: UTC-5 (Eastern (EST))
  - Summer (DST): UTC-4 (EDT)
- ZIP codes: 32962
- Area code: 772
- GNIS ID: 295511
- Website: www.ghosttowns.com/states/fl/oslo.html

First settled circa 1883, Oslo is an unincorporated community in southeastern Indian River County, Florida, United States. It is part of the Sebastian–Vero Beach Metropolitan Statistical Area. The town of Oslo, as it was called, was first established by some of Indian River County's first pioneers, which included the Helseth, Gifford, and Hallstrom families. The area was given the name Oslo by the Helseth family in 1898.

The community is located in the present-day Census-Designated Place (CDP) of Florida Ridge.

== History ==
The Gifford family settled the area in 1887 from Vermont. The Helseth family, immigrants from Norway, were also among the first European settlers in the region, moving to the area known as Crawford’s Point in 1896, with Ole Olsen (O.O.) Helseth buying 160 acres of land to build a homestead. The Hallstrom family, Swedish immigrants, arrived to the area in 1904, and bought 40 acres of land in 1908 in the settlement. In 1918, Axel Hallstrom constructed the Hallstrom House in Oslo, which was added to the National Register of Historic Places in 2002.

When establishing a postal address for the homestead in 1898, the name was required to be four letters, with O.O. Helseth choosing to name the settlement Oslo. The post office was operational until it was merged with Vero’s post office in 1919.

Following the naming of the settlement, a road was built, which would be named Oslo Road.

The citrus industry became a major economic force in Oslo, which became the most successful industry in the settlement. This triggered significant growth, with Oslo’s population rising to a peak of 200-300 residents in the late 1920s.

When Oslo was to become a part of Indian River County in 1925, the settlement was left unincorporated within the county.

Oslo experienced severe economic downturn and depopulation following two devastating hurricanes in 1928: one in August, and one in September. The situation was exacerbated by the Great Depression a year later.

Oslo was later included as a part of the Census-Designated Place (CDP) of Florida Ridge.

On October 9, 2024, a destructive EF-3 tornado tracked through the Oslo area and inflicted severe structural damage to the community. The system was part of a historic tornado outbreak spawned across Florida by Hurricane Milton.

== See also ==
- Nevins
- Citrus Ridge
