= The Fisherman's Granddaughter =

- Directed by: Sidney Olcott
- Produced by: Sidney Olcott
- Production company: Kalem Company
- Distributed by: General Film Company
- Release date: February 16, 1910
- Running time: 950 ft
- Country: United States
- Languages: Silent film (English intertitles)

The Fisherman's Granddaughter is a 1910 American silent film produced by Kalem Company and directed by Sidney Olcott.

== Plot summary ==
The New York Dramatic Mirror summarized the plot: "The old fisherman's granddaughter runs off with a stranger and is married. The old man is at first unforgiving, but his love at last prompts him to put a light in the window for the wayward girl should she ever return. She has a rough time of it, poor girl, her husband deserting her because his wealthy parents object to the marriage. At last she turns her face homeward and the light welcomes her in. The grandfather's heart softens when he sees her and the babe she carries in her arms, and we may suppose that a peaceful future is in store for her."

== Production notes ==
The movie was filmed in Roseland, Florida and included "beautiful scenery" shot along the Saint John's River. The New York–based Kalem Company was the first film studio to do winter production in Florida.

== Critical reception ==
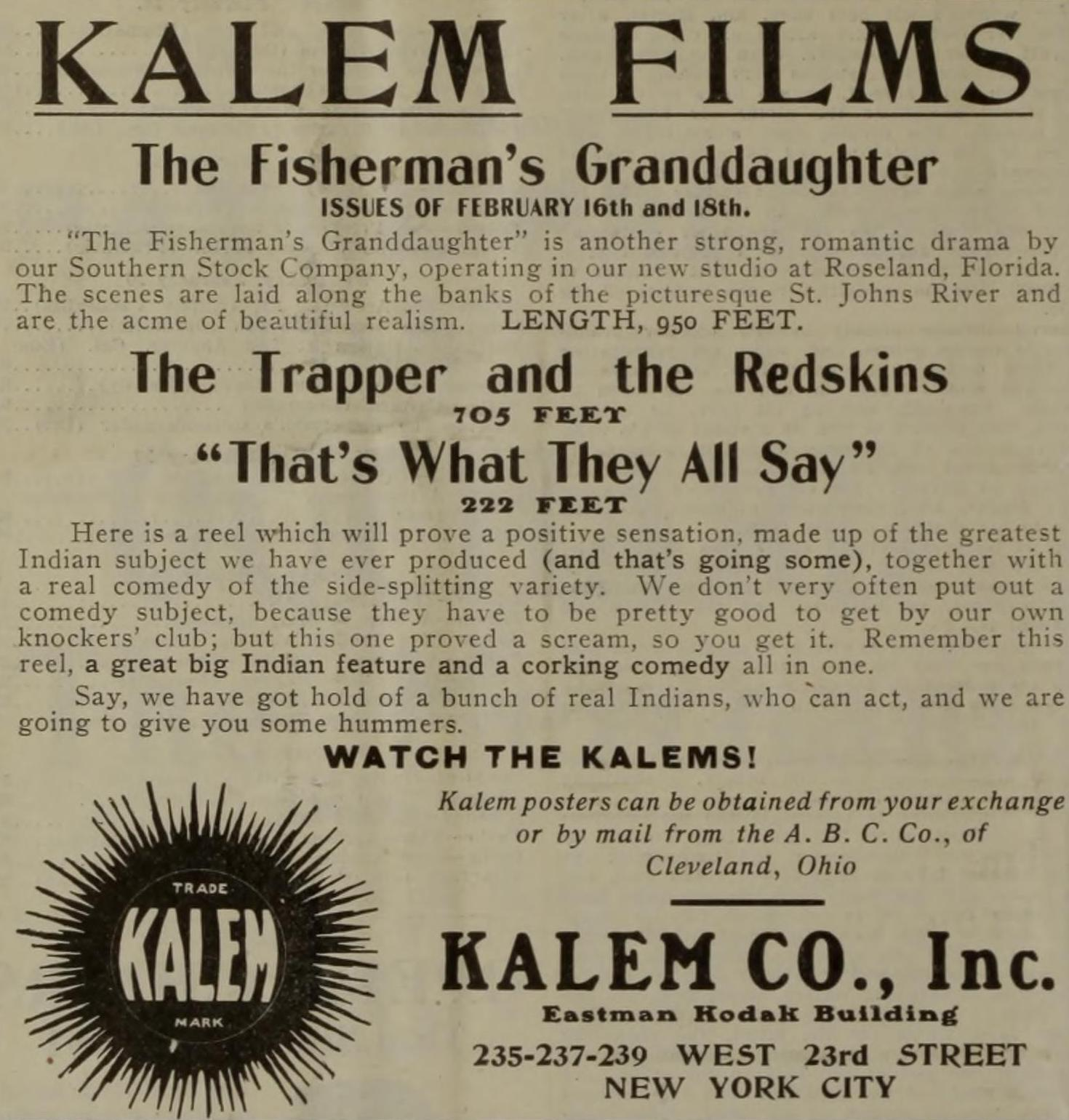
Advertisement for The Fisherman's Granddaughter, 1910.

The Moving Picture World said that The Fisherman's Granddaughter had a "strongly dramatic quality" and that the film was "clearly photographed and admirably acted". The New York Dramatic Mirror described the film: "A simple story, but well told, with good expression and heart interest, is presented in this picture." A reviewer for Variety stated that the film's story, about a romance between a woman of an unnamed island and a sailor, was "an old and familiar one without any action or especial merit".
