= Archie Carr National Wildlife Refuge =

United States National Wildlife Refuge in Florida

- IUCN category V (protected landscape/seascape)
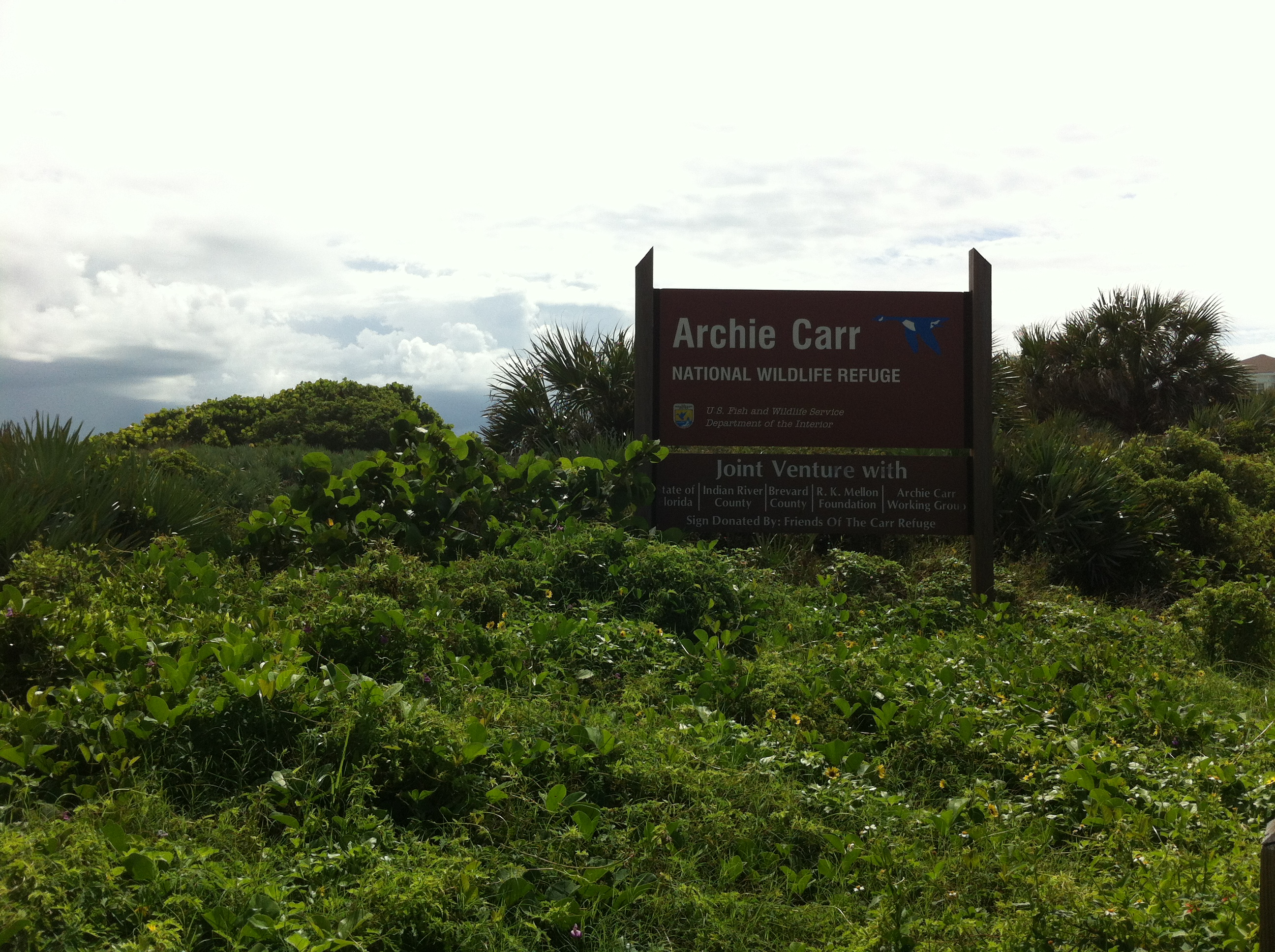
- Archie Carr National Wildlife Refuge

- Location within the United States Location within Florida
- Location: Brevard County and Indian River County, Florida, United States
- Nearest city: Melbourne Beach, Florida and Wabasso Beach, Florida
- Coordinates: 27°55′N 80°29′W
- Area: 900 acres (360 ha)
- Established: 1991
- Governing body: United States Fish and Wildlife Service
- Website: www.fws.gov/refuge/Archie_Carr/

The Archie Carr National Wildlife Refuge is part of the United States National Wildlife Refuge (NWR) System, located along a twenty-mile (30 km) section of coastline from Melbourne Beach to Wabasso Beach, Florida, along State Road A1A. The 900 acre (3.6 km^{2}) refuge was established in 1991, to protect the loggerhead and green sea turtles.

== Management ==
Since 2012 the Archie Carr NWR is administered as part of the Everglades Headwaters NWR Complex, along with Pelican Island NWR, Lake Wales Ridge NWR, and the Everglades Headwaters National Wildlife Refuge and Conservation Area, through a partnership with the Caribbean Conservation Corporation (a nonprofit turtle conservation group founded by Dr. Archie Carr himself) and Archie Carr Working Group.

== Habitat ==
The refuge provides nesting habitats for approximately one-fourth of all sea turtles nesting in the United States. About 15,000-20,000 sea turtles nests are laid annually, mostly loggerheads, green sea turtles, and some leatherbacks. The refuge also provides habitat for several other threatened and endangered species.

Three centers within the sanctuary are run by Brevard County under the aegis of the restrictions established by the federal government.

== Conservation efforts ==
Archie Carr NWR is threatened by sea level rise. Scientists and researchers are studying the impacts of sea level rise on this ecosystem.
