= The National Elephant Center =

Coordinates: 27.7678°N 80.6015°W

The National Elephant Center, Inc.
- Formation: 2006; 20 years ago
- Dissolved: 2016; 10 years ago
- Type: Nonprofit
- Tax ID no.: 20-5860576
- Legal status: 501(c)(3)
- Headquarters: Fellsmere, Florida

The National Elephant Center was an American 501(c)(3) non-profit conservation organization founded by a group of ten directors from zoos accredited by the Association of Zoos and Aquariums (AZA).

The National Elephant Center was open from 2013 - 2016 and is now closed. It was created to provide care to African and Asian elephants on a 225-acre (91 ha) site in Fellsmere, Florida. In addition to providing care to animals, its goal was also contribute research, support and population management to accredited zoos with elephants. The National Elephant Center was forced to close in 2016 after the deaths of three elephants.

Though not accredited by the Association of Zoos and Aquariums (AZA), the National Elephant Center was a collaborative effort between AZA institutions and was intended to become the center for AZA elephant population management. It envisioned itself as a world leader in elephant conservation, scientific research and care for elephant populations in zoos and in the wild.

== History ==
In 2004, the idea of creating a national center for elephants came as the result of an Association of Zoos and Aquariums Elephant Management Strategic Planning Meeting involving thought leaders and members of the Elephant Taxon Advisory Group/Species Survival Plan (TAG/SSP). For many years, curators, keepers, veterinarians and others associated with elephants at Association of Zoos and Aquariums (AZA) institutions wanted a facility to provide short- and long-term solutions to help manage the nation’s 290 (approx.) elephants that live at 109 different AZA-accredited facilities.

Following the meeting, dozens of AZA-accredited zoos donated critical funding support to explore options for establishing a Center to serve as a tool in elephant management and conservation.

A search was launched to research potential sites to locate the center. Initially a team of elephant experts selected property offered by Waste Management, Inc. near Okeechobee in central Florida.

The National Elephant Center was formally announced in February 2008 at a ceremony held at the Houston Zoo. The Center was expected to break ground in late 2008, with a goal to welcome its first elephants sometime in 2009. The original site was adjacent to property that Waste Management maintains as a natural area certified by the Wildlife Habitat Council that provides food and nesting areas for threatened Florida sandhill cranes and other endangered species. Waste Management was to lease the land to The National Elephant Center for $1 per year for 40 years.

However, it was eventually decided that a site in Fellsmere, Florida was more suitable, and groundbreaking occurred in April 2012. The center's first residents arrived in May 2013, when a family group of two females and two males arrived from Disney's Animal Kingdom Theme Park. Completion of the initial plan was thought to likely to take up to 10 years.

The center housed five elephants, the last two of which were moved there from Disney's Animal Kingdom. After the first three to move to the center died, one of the surviving elephants was returned to Disney, and the other was moved to the Jacksonville Zoo and Gardens. The center has ceased operations.

== Facilities ==
The National Elephant Center
- Interactive map of The National Elephant Center
- Date opened: 2013
- Date closed: 2016
- Location: Fellsmere, Florida
- Land area: 225 acres (91 ha)
- Major exhibits: None - was not open to the public

The National Elephant Center is located on 225 acres (91 ha) in Fellsmere, Florida.

The Elephant Center featured on-site housing for staff and two barns for Asian and African elephants, each capable of supporting nine animals. The design called for barns to be connected by a central hub, surrounded by a 10-acre (4.0 ha) habitat that can be subdivided depending on the needs of the elephants.

The largest area of the Elephant Center was the Central Elephant Meander, a 50-acre (20 ha) area that consists of multiple landscapes linked by a series of paths and trails. The area introduced landform and habitat elements from the savannahs and woodlands of the elephants’ home ranges, containing waterholes, sand dunes, plants and scattered browse.

== Elephant population management ==
As a permanent facility, The National Elephant center provided:

1. Population management support for AZA-accredited zoos, including short- and long-term holding for bull elephants; residency for elephants when their home facilities are being renovated; and residency when herd dynamics change (births, deaths), to test compatibility and new social groupings.
2. Centralized training facility and programs for keepers, veterinarians and others to answer an increasing need for a practical, hands-on training in the latest developments in management, nutrition, preventative health care, enrichment, training and research, as well as expertise and facilities for artificial insemination (AI) and breeding.
3. Elephant research opportunities, including areas of reproduction, memory, communication, visual acuity, nutritional requirements, pathology of disease and its treatment to aid Asian and African elephant populations.
4. Support to advance elephant conservation programs by serving as a resource for elephant experts and facilitating collaborations among the AZA Elephant Taxon Advisory Group/Species Survival Plan, field scientists and researchers, government organizations, and NGOs, such as the International Elephant Foundation.
5. Supporting public education of elephants. Studies show that accredited zoo education programs and opportunities for people to see elephants up close and inspire wildlife conservation awareness and action. The Center was an elephant resource and learning center and develop programs to help reach the public with important education messages about elephants.

== Research and conservation ==
Research - Wild populations of elephants are increasingly becoming managed due to shrinking habitat, decreasing population dynamics and encroachment by human development. Population management research at The National Elephant Center will provide conservationists with tools and techniques for managing these populations in the wild.

Advocacy – The Center envisioned becoming a voice for elephants nationally and internationally through advocacy and collaboration that will speak up for elephants on issues that affect their continued survival.

Education – Though not open to the public, The National Elephant Center's goal included educating school children locally and supporting formal education programs at accredited zoos throughout the country, which teach millions of visitors each year about elephants and their status in the wild.

Conservation – The Center provided an important space for research that will assist zoos that aid the Asian and African elephant populations in the wild.

== Research programs ==
The National Elephant Center provided leadership and assistance to support the more than 85 elephant research programs that directly address many of the issues affecting elephants in the wild. The Center will also support the International Elephant Foundation (IEF), a 501(c)(3) non-profit organization that supports a wide variety of elephant conservation and related scientific and educational projects worldwide.
