= St. Sebastian River =

Coastal river located in eastern Florida

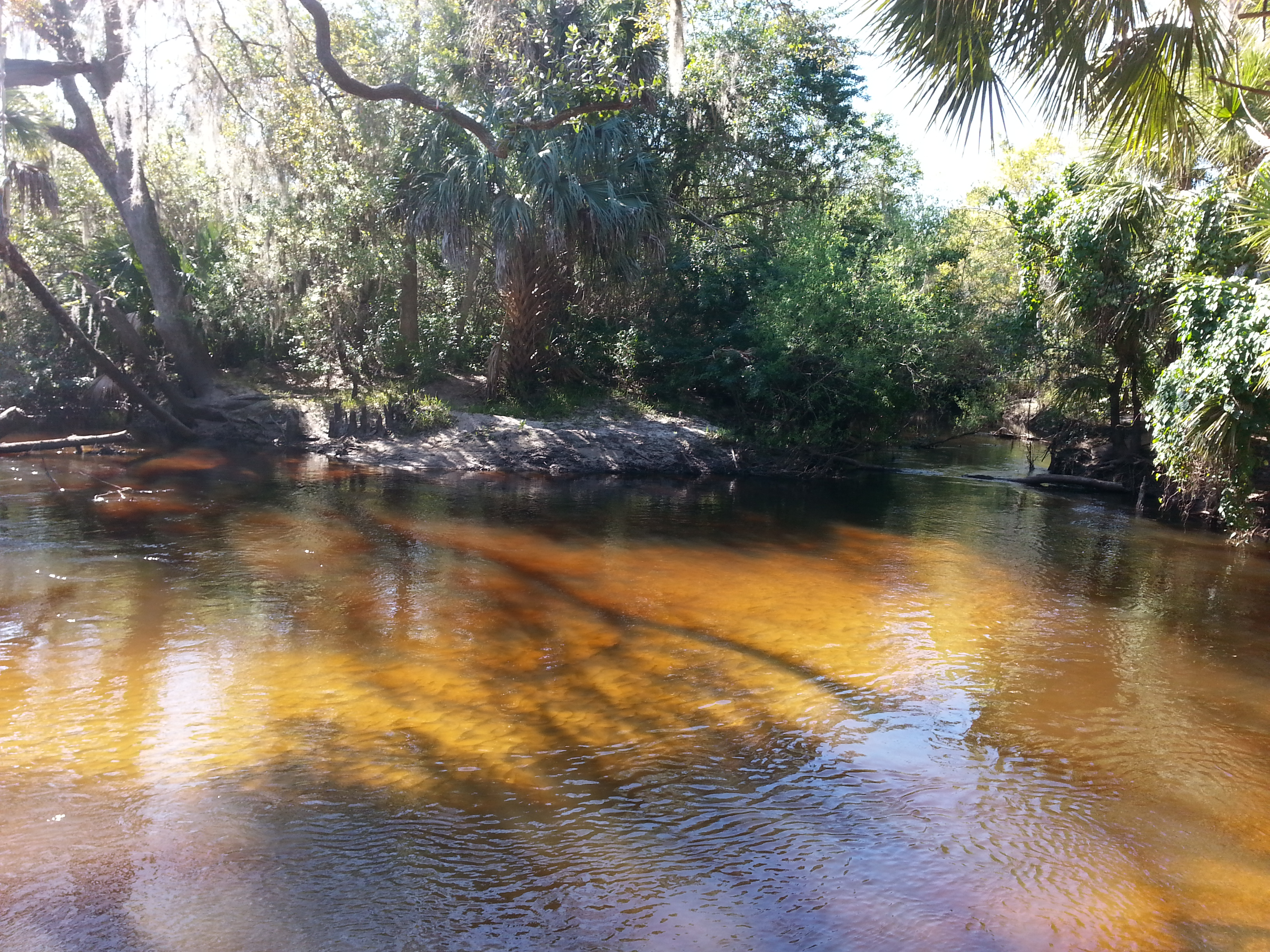
- The St. Sebastian River as seen from a viewing spot in Sebastian, Florida
- Etymology: Spanish: Mártir Cristiano San Sebastian

Location
- Country: United States
- State: Florida
- Counties: Indian River, Brevard
- Cities: Fellsmere, Sebastian

Physical characteristics
- Source: St. Sebastian River South Prong Preserve
  - location: near Fellsmere, Indian River County, Florida
  - coordinates: 27°57′18″N 80°47′3″W
- 2nd source: Headwaters Lake
  - location: near Fellsmere, Indian River County, Florida
  - coordinates: 27°44′54.37″N 80°29′5.99″W
- Mouth: Indian River
  - location: Roseland, Indian River County, Florida
  - coordinates: 27°24′05″N 81°24′3″W
  - elevation: 0 ft (0 m)
- Length: 1 mi (1.6 km)

The Saint Sebastian River is a river located in the state of Florida, United States. It is a major tributary river draining northeast into the Indian River Lagoon northwest of the city of Sebastian. This river contributes around 16% of the total annual freshwater that enters the Indian River. The river lies in the southern part of the Indian River basin on the east coast of Florida. It is sourced from the South Prong St. Sebastian River Preserve where it flows for about 1.6 kilometers (1 mi). The main urban center is runs through is the city of Sebastian, Florida occupying approximately 9,000 acres of the 100,000 acres overall Sebastian River Watershed. The majority of the cities storm water run-off enter this river often being delivered by a system of canals, ditches and swales.

The river has long been recognized by several programs such as the Indian River Lagoon National Estuary Program and the Indian River Lagoon SWIM Program to be an important body of water that needs water quality rehabilitation and protection. The River has been designated a slow-speed zone due to the presence of the endangered West Indian Manatees. As such, the State of Florida has purchased large pieces of land along the shoreline and uplands along the river.

The river is a great place for canoeing and fishing where game fish such as tarpon and snook can be caught. There are several public parks located here and guided tours often given in canoe, kayak or powerboat. Because it is one of the few coastal rivers left in Florida to not be heavily developed, it contains landscapes that show what Florida was like in the past before development.

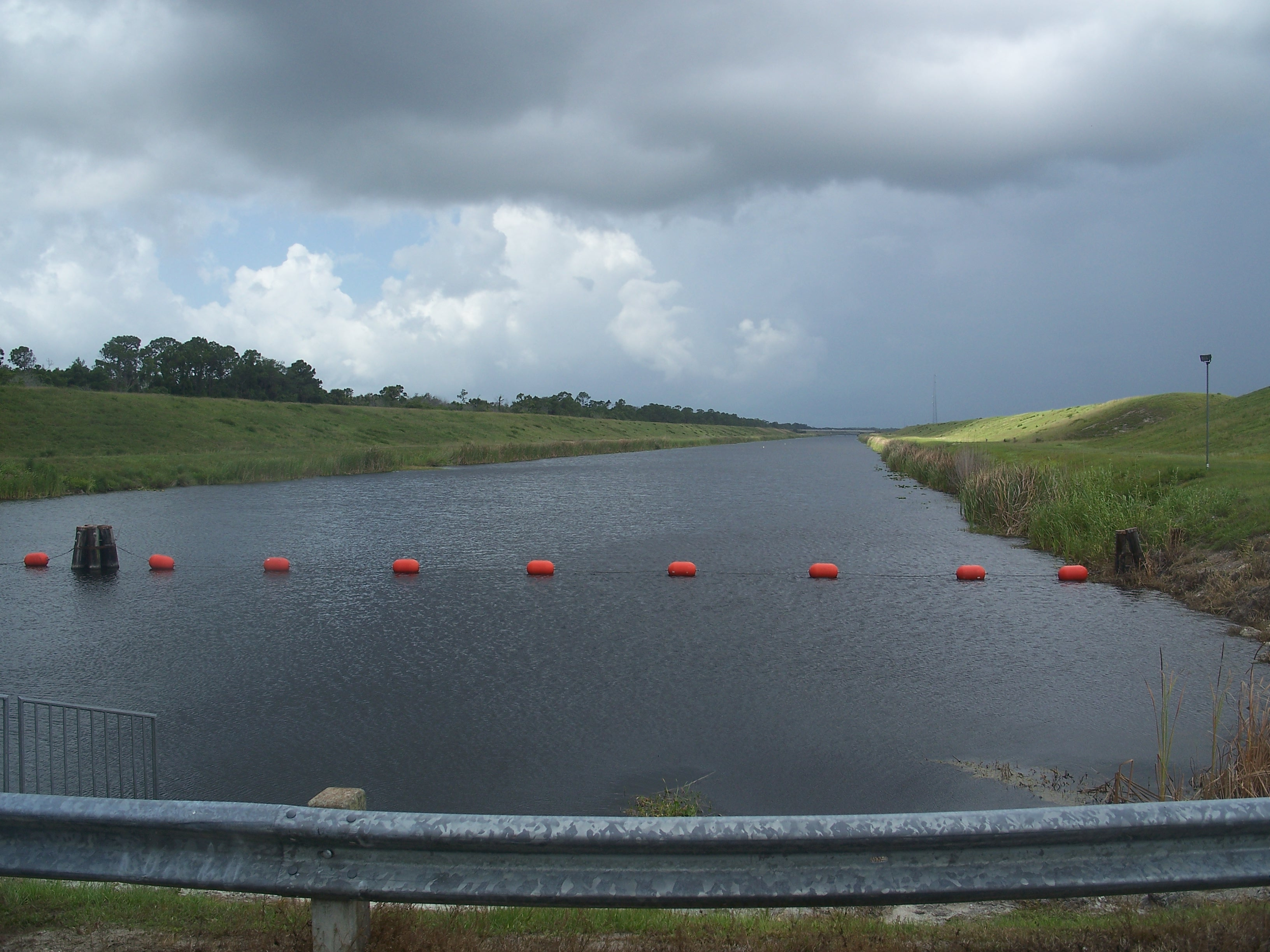
Manatee viewing area on the C-54 Canal

== Hydrology ==
=== Salinity ===
The salinity of Saint Sebastian River is highly dependent on the patterns of mixing and circulation and the volumetric contributions of freshwater and saltwater. Due to the dynamic nature of a variety of factors such as streamflow, wind speed and direction, water temperature, tidal discharge and downstream salinity, the river experiences variations in the relative contributions of freshwater and saltwater. Another contribution decreasing salinity levels is from storms bringing an increased flow of freshwater. Density driven vertical stratification also promotes saline conditions at the bottom of the Saint Sebastian River by sorting out the less dense freshwater to the top and the denser saline water to the bottom. Because the different water types are sorted, freshwater is transported in the upper layers of the river. The freshwater does not completely mix with and dilute the saltier water below. The freshwater rarely mixes doing so infrequently. They can mix during storm conditions where large stormwater inflows are sufficiently strong enough to flush the saltwater at the bottom into the Indian River.

Prior to land development in the rivers drainage basin, the Saint Sebastian River was predominantly a saline environment. This is because tidal influxes from the Indian River are large, much larger than any streamflow the relatively small streamflow the river receives. However the salinity levels of the river has decreased due to an increase in freshwater discharged from urbanization and changes in the land use for agriculture and land development. The decreasing salinity levels of this river also decreases levels in the Indian River Lagoon as it drains into it. The consequences of this change affects the commercial fishing industry.

=== Tides ===
Tides are at their yearly highest during the months of October and November and they are at their yearly lowest from February throughout April.

=== Winds ===
The winds during the summer months blow across the river on the northeastern direction. The wind changes throughout the day with offshore winds increasing during the afternoon. Winds prevailing from the north and northeast build up water within the river system. Strong winds combined with strong tides, often occurring in the fall and winter months, forces large volumes of water further upstream creating a build up of water in the river.

== Wildlife ==
Saint Sebastian River is home to a wide variety of species which includes several endangered species. This list of species includes mammals (including aquatic mammals), reptiles, birds and fish.

=== Mammals ===
Many mammalian species can be found here including deer, coyotes (Canis latrans) and bobcats (Lynx rufus). Aquatic mammals found in the river includes dolphins and otters.

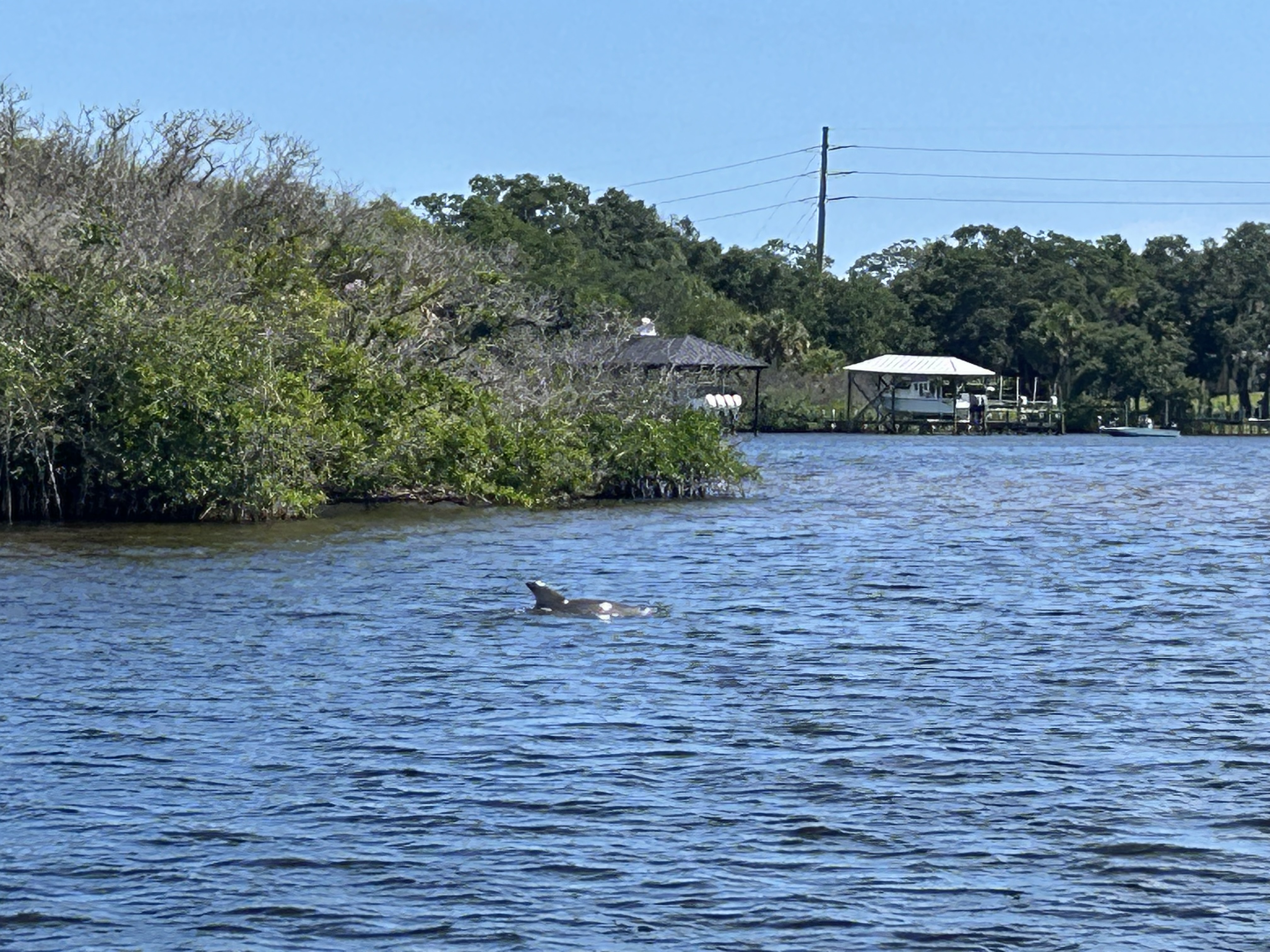
A dolphin only seen by its fin from the St. Sebastian River.

=== Reptiles ===
Reptiles including alligators and Eastern indigo snakes (Drymarchon couperi) inhabit the river. Alligators have been known to attack unprovoked humans and pets, although this is rare and is advised to keep one's distance. Gopher tortoises (Gopherus polyphemus) are also found around the river in the more upland areas.

=== Birds ===
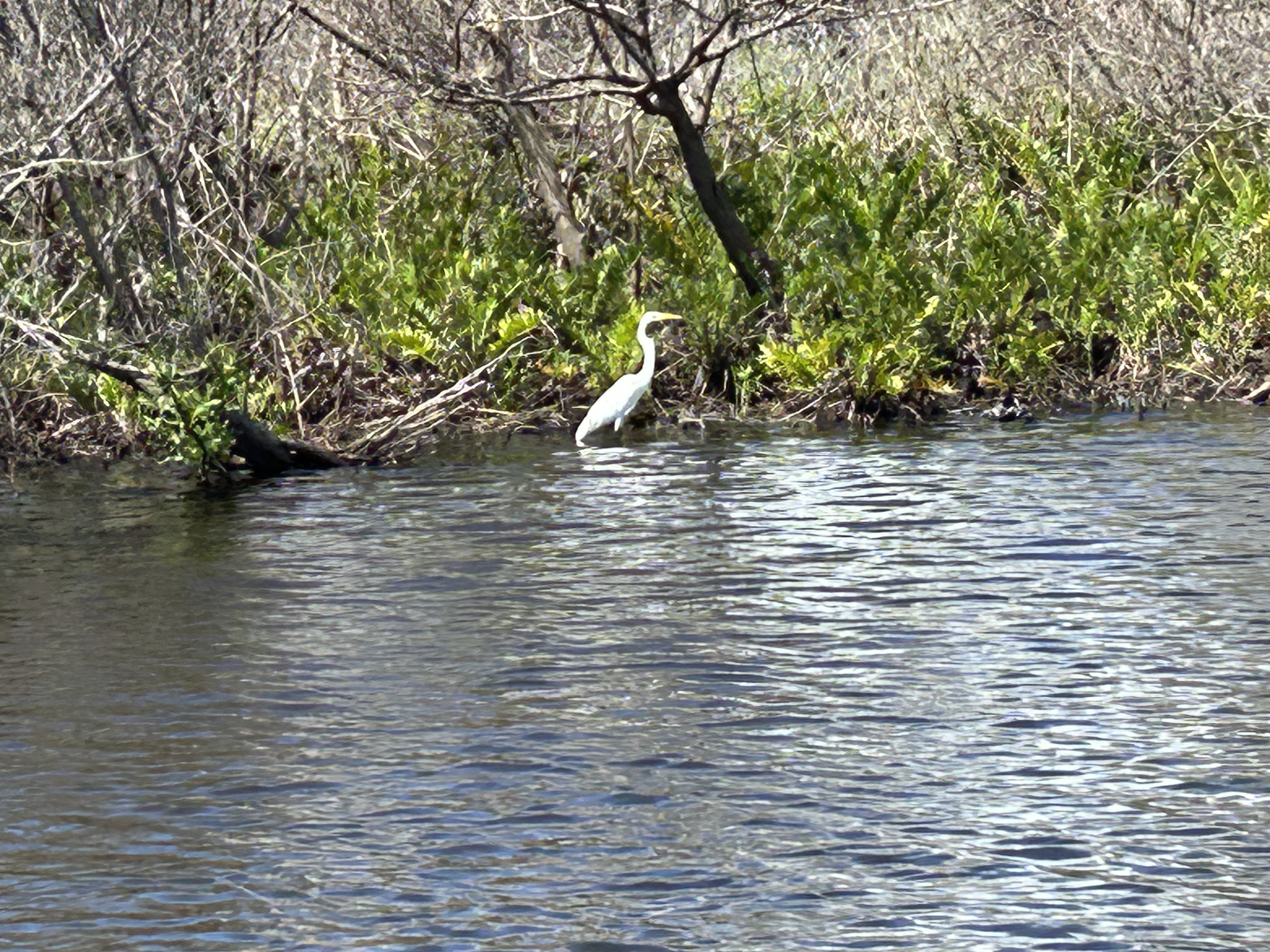
A Great Egret (Ardea alba) seen along the St. Sebastian River.

Many bird species have been seen inhabiting the river including eagles such as Haliaeetus leucocephalus, the Florida scrub jay (Aphelocoma coerulescens) and several species of wading birds. Also found here includes red-cockaded woodpeckers (Leuconotopicus borealis), Bachman's sparrows (Peucaea aestivalis), American kestrels (Falco sparverius), sandhill cranes (Antigone canadensis) wild turkeys (Meleagris gallopavo), quail, Palm Warblers (Setophaga palmarum) and wood storks (Mycteria americana). Pine Warblers (Setophaga pinus) seem to have a large presence in the northeast region of the park.

=== Aquatic life ===
Many species of game fish live in the river including tarpon, small bass, mullet and snook alongside many rare and endemic species. Both freshwater and saltwater fish species inhabit the river. West Indian Manatees (Trichechus manatus) can be found in Saint Sebastian River all-year round during any season. Sometimes, over a hundred manatees can be found congregating in the river.

== History ==
The river was first described and named in the book “A Concise Natural History of East and West Florida” by Bernard Romans, a Dutch-American navigator who was a cartographer for King George III. The river would then be surveyed and mapped more by Don Andres Burgevin on the 18th of June 1819 by decree of the Spanish Government. The river would again be mentioned in the book “Observations Upon the Floridas” and again by James Gasden in 1825 during a survey for a road for the United States Army along the east coast of Florida. In his survey he stated the names of the principle rivers that were obstructions to the road which the Saint Sebastian river was apart off. He would mention that a ferry would be necessary for the river if it was not fordable.

Lieutenant Levin M. Powell of the United States Navy during the Second Seminole War was ordered to go down the Indian River with 33 small light boats and two hundred men that were a mixed group of soldiers, sailors and volunteers. They would camp out on the high oak bluff on the north bank of the Saint Sebastion River on the 28th of December 1837 where they were to ascend looking for Native Americans. Following the Third Seminole War, Andrew Canova would build a thatched hut near the mouth of the river where he would live for three years before heading to St. Augustine to join the Confederate States Army in 1861 during the American Civil War.

During the late 1950s, General Development Corporation (GDC) designed and constructed infrastructure for streets and drainages to support development of approximately 15,000 sites of single-family homes, most of which have been developed by the late 1990s. Also during the 1950s, during an early phase of land development, a system of canals, ditches and swales were built to collect storm water and run it into the Saint Sebastian River. These systems, unlike modern development standards, do not provide storm water storage or water quality treatment. This river is currently one of the few costal rivers in eastern Florida to not be heavily developed.

Seagrass bed populations located south of the mouth of the river have become more fragmentary. This is probably due to increased turbidity as a result of non-point source pollution. This is also seen throughout the Indian River Lagoon with an overall reduction in the total acreage of grass beds and decreases in the maximum depth of these beds.

=== Dredging ===
This river has been severely impact from on-site sewage treatment and disposal systems (OSTDS). This has led it and the Indian River Lagoon it drains into to accumulate and become over-enriched in nutrients such as nitrogen (N) and phosphorus (P) in a process called eutrophication.

Dredging of the river took place from 2006 through 2009 removing 2,000,000 cubic feet (57,000 m^{3}) of muck from the bottom of the St. Sebastian River. The muck consisted of silt, clay, sand, shell and organic material, which consumed oxygen and threatened the life of aquatic species. This dredging project costed around $18 million.

=== Naming ===
The river had a variety of names before the Sebastian Area Historical Society was founded in 1985. These names included the Sebastian Creek, St. Sebastian Creek, Sebastian River, San Sebastian River, San Sebastian Bay and the St. Sebastian River. On November 1, 1988, the historical society filed a request with the United States Department of Interior, Board of Geographic Names (BGN) to restore the name of the river to its original historic, St. Sebastian River. The society received a reply on November 15 stating:

This will acknowledge your proposal to have the name Saint Sebastian River made official for Federal maps and other publications. This proposal has been submitted to the Board on Geographic Names by the National Ocean Service, and the name is on the docket for Board consideration.

— Board of Geographic Names

On December 22, the Board of Geographic Names would approve the names Saint Sebastian River, North Prong Saint Sebastian River and South Prong Saint Sebastian River. This was done in a letter that was sent to the society from the board which said:

We are pleased to inform you that the Board on Geographic Names, at its Dec. 8, 1988 meeting, approved the names Saint Sebastian River, North Prong Saint Sebastian River and South Prong Saint Sebastian River. These names will be published in Decision List 8804.

— Board of Geographic Names

== See also ==
- St. Sebastian River Preserve State Park
