= List of Florida locations by per capita income =

As of 2000 Florida had the eighteenth highest per capita income in the United States of America, at $21,557. Its personal per capita income was in 2003 $30,446. Per capita income had increased to $32,848 by 2020.

== Most recent per capita income and household income ==
Virginia economic demographics by county as of 31 December 2020
State	County	Per capita income	Median house– hold income	Total income	Population	Number of house– holds
United States		$35,384	$98,357	$120,344,871 million	340,110,988	122,354,219
Florida		$32,848	$89,201	$7,074,863 million	21,538,187	7,931,313
	Alachua County	$29,821	$81,430	$83,041 million	278,468	101,979
	Baker County	$24,051	$76,988	$6,796 million	28,259	8,828
	Bay County	$30,774	$73,325	$53,920 million	175,216	73,536
	Bradford County	$21,003	$63,795	$5,944 million	28,303	9,318
	Brevard County	$33,662	$86,522	$204,197 million	606,612	236,005
	Broward County	$34,063	$76,983	$662,312 million	1,944,375	860,329
	Calhoun County	$19,512	$59,046	$2,662 million	13,648	4,510
	Charlotte County	$33,275	$77,922	$62,173 million	186,847	79,789
	Citrus County	$28,174	$67,073	$43,343 million	153,843	64,621
	Clay County	$32,037	$92,780	$69,919 million	218,245	75,360
	Collier County	$46,785	$118,799	$175,795 million	375,752	147,977
	Columbia County	$24,569	$67,939	$17,124 million	69,698	25,205
	DeSoto County	$18,193	$49,764	$6,181 million	33,976	12,421
	Dixie County	$19,911	$53,535	$3,336 million	16,759	6,233
	Duval County	$32,233	$86,799	$320,901 million	995,567	369,704
	Escambia County	$29,166	$76,849	$93,886 million	321,905	122,169
	Flagler County	$32,722	$85,726	$37,753 million	115,378	44,040
	Franklin County	$26,211	$69,570	$3,263 million	12,451	4,691
	Gadsden County	$21,087	$53,397	$9,241 million	43,826	17,307
	Gilchrist County	$22,775	$60,715	$4,068 million	17,864	6,701
	Glades County	$22,128	$55,222	$2,683 million	12,126	4,859
	Gulf County	$27,626	$66,486	$3,920 million	14,192	5,897
	Hamilton County	$15,532	$49,603	$2,175 million	14,004	4,385
	Hardee County	$20,181	$63,962	$5,111 million	25,327	7,991
	Hendry County	$20,122	$61,905	$7,972 million	39,619	12,878
	Hernando County	$26,520	$67,249	$51,585 million	194,515	76,708
	Highlands County	$27,979	$66,301	$28,324 million	101,235	42,721
	Hillsborough County	$33,616	$81,394	$490,713 million	1,459,762	602,886
	Holmes County	$19,028	$52,396	$3,739 million	19,653	7,137
	Indian River County	$38,274	$100,325	$61,157 million	159,788	60,959
	Jackson County	$21,058	$56,832	$9,964 million	47,319	17,533
	Jefferson County	$25,795	$66,327	$3,742 million	14,510	5,643
	Lafayette County	$17,022	$60,485	$1,400 million	8,226	2,315
	Lake County	$29,426	$82,201	$112,982 million	383,956	137,446
	Lee County	$34,818	$91,688	$264,903 million	760,822	288,916
	Leon County	$31,778	$79,683	$92,854 million	292,198	116,530
	Levy County	$22,772	$57,584	$9,772 million	42,915	16,971
	Liberty County	$19,585	$62,145	$1,561 million	7,974	2,513
	Madison County	$18,909	$49,304	$3,397 million	17,968	6,891
	Manatee County	$35,146	$93,439	$140,482 million	399,710	150,345
	Marion County	$26,990	$69,556	$101,457 million	375,908	145,863
	Martin County	$43,758	$106,869	$69,326 million	158,431	64,870
	Miami-Dade County	$29,598	$74,409	$799,668 million	2,701,767	1,074,685
	Monroe County	$47,382	$119,739	$39,267 million	82,874	32,794
	Nassau County	$37,787	$101,990	$34,141 million	90,352	33,475
	Okaloosa County	$34,357	$91,781	$72,722 million	211,668	79,235
	Okeechobee County	$23,133	$62,809	$9,170 million	39,644	14,601
	Orange County	$31,409	$79,935	$449,119 million	1,429,908	561,851
	Osceola County	$24,146	$85,592	$93,844 million	388,656	109,642
	Palm Beach County	$40,957	$86,567	$611,156 million	1,492,191	705,988
	Pasco County	$29,498	$79,121	$165,746 million	561,891	209,483
	Pinellas County	$36,754	$85,304	$352,510 million	959,107	413,239
	Polk County	$25,820	$77,718	$187,206 million	725,046	240,879
	Putnam County	$22,257	$54,721	$16,319 million	73,321	29,822
	St. Johns County	$43,433	$130,140	$118,756 million	273,425	91,253
	St. Lucie County	$28,426	$78,957	$93,585 million	329,226	118,527
	Santa Rosa County	$32,322	$92,493	$60,765 million	188,000	65,697
	Sarasota County	$44,402	$101,838	$192,707 million	434,006	189,228
	Seminole County	$36,016	$95,221	$169,583 million	470,856	178,094
	Sumter County	$35,879	$78,803	$46,553 million	129,752	59,076
	Suwannee County	$23,389	$67,120	$10,168 million	43,474	15,149
	Taylor County	$19,492	$59,236	$4,248 million	21,796	7,172
	Union County	$20,663	$83,244	$3,336 million	16,147	4,008
	Volusia County	$29,859	$74,996	$165,282 million	553,543	220,386
	Wakulla County	$28,320	$84,009	$9,561 million	33,764	11,382
	Walton County	$35,996	$94,663	$27,106 million	75,305	28,635
	Washington County	$19,375	$54,280	$4,905 million	25,318	9,037

Note: Data is automatically updated to be the latest on Wikidata. At the time of page automation this was the 2020 United States Census and the 2016–2020 American Community Survey.

Ranked Florida's Per Capita Income Distribution by County latest official survey

Total Florida per capita income (wikidata:Q812) = 32,848 US$ (2020 survey methodology)

[Hide/show County Per Capita Income]
No.	Florida	per capita income US$	year	Wikidata page
1	Monroe County, Florida	47,382	2020	Q263742
2	Collier County, Florida	46,785	2020	Q488531
3	Sarasota County, Florida	44,402	2020	Q501163
4	Martin County, Florida	43,758	2020	Q648752
5	St. Johns County, Florida	43,433	2020	Q494471
6	Palm Beach County, Florida	40,957	2020	Q484294
7	Indian River County, Florida	38,274	2020	Q488528
8	Nassau County, Florida	37,787	2020	Q488818
9	Pinellas County, Florida	36,754	2020	Q494556
10	Seminole County, Florida	36,016	2020	Q280596
11	Walton County, Florida	35,996	2020	Q503455
12	Sumter County, Florida	35,879	2020	Q503889
13	Manatee County, Florida	35,146	2020	Q262708
14	Lee County, Florida	34,818	2020	Q494616
15	Okaloosa County, Florida	34,357	2020	Q494476
16	Broward County, Florida	34,063	2020	Q494624
17	Brevard County, Florida	33,662	2020	Q488517
18	Hillsborough County, Florida	33,616	2020	Q488874
19	Charlotte County, Florida	33,275	2020	Q488499
20	Flagler County, Florida	32,722	2020	Q386885
21	Santa Rosa County, Florida	32,322	2020	Q494500
22	Duval County, Florida	32,233	2020	Q493605
23	Clay County, Florida	32,037	2020	Q488853
24	Leon County, Florida	31,778	2020	Q488576
25	Orange County, Florida	31,409	2020	Q488543
26	Bay County, Florida	30,774	2020	Q488865
27	Volusia County, Florida	29,859	2020	Q494541
28	Alachua County, Florida	29,821	2020	Q488826
29	Miami-Dade County, Florida	29,598	2020	Q468557
30	Pasco County, Florida	29,498	2020	Q500992
31	Lake County, Florida	29,426	2020	Q501029
32	Escambia County, Florida	29,166	2020	Q156643
33	St. Lucie County, Florida	28,426	2020	Q494564
34	Wakulla County, Florida	28,320	2020	Q505417
35	Citrus County, Florida	28,174	2020	Q488821
36	Highlands County, Florida	27,979	2020	Q488885
37	Gulf County, Florida	27,626	2020	Q488461
38	Marion County, Florida	26,990	2020	Q501014
39	Hernando County, Florida	26,520	2020	Q488572
40	Franklin County, Florida	26,211	2020	Q488813
41	Polk County, Florida	25,820	2020	Q501043
42	Jefferson County, Florida	25,795	2020	Q488859
43	Columbia County, Florida	24,569	2020	Q173867
44	Osceola County, Florida	24,146	2020	Q501067
45	Baker County, Florida	24,051	2020	Q156568
46	Suwannee County, Florida	23,389	2020	Q501036
47	Okeechobee County, Florida	23,133	2020	Q501123
48	Gilchrist County, Florida	22,775	2020	Q111720
49	Levy County, Florida	22,772	2020	Q501022
50	Putnam County, Florida	22,257	2020	Q503059
51	Glades County, Florida	22,128	2020	Q488468
52	Gadsden County, Florida	21,087	2020	Q501848
53	Jackson County, Florida	21,058	2020	Q488537
54	Bradford County, Florida	21,003	2020	Q156577
55	Union County, Florida	20,663	2020	Q501078
56	Hardee County, Florida	20,181	2020	Q488792
57	Hendry County, Florida	20,122	2020	Q488488
58	Dixie County, Florida	19,911	2020	Q488805
59	Liberty County, Florida	19,585	2020	Q255943
60	Calhoun County, Florida	19,512	2020	Q174913
61	Taylor County, Florida	19,492	2020	Q503064
62	Washington County, Florida	19,375	2020	Q263418
63	Holmes County, Florida	19,028	2020	Q488879
64	Madison County, Florida	18,909	2020	Q494463
65	DeSoto County, Florida	18,193	2020	Q488796
66	Lafayette County, Florida	17,022	2020	Q488810
67	Hamilton County, Florida	15,532	2020	Q257311

== Historic per capita income and household income by location ==
Florida counties ranked by per capita income from 2006 to 2010 data.

Rank	County	Per capita income	Median household income	Median family income	Population	Number of households
1	Collier	$37,046	$58,106	$68,556	321,520	133,179
2	St. Johns	$36,027	$62,663	$79,080	190,039	75,338
3	Martin	$35,772	$53,210	$70,271	146,318	63,899
4	Monroe	$35,516	$53,821	$66,152	73,090	32,629
5	Palm Beach	$33,610	$53,242	$64,445	1,320,134	544,227
6	Sarasota	$33,045	$49,388	$62,326	379,448	175,746
7	Indian River	$31,918	$47,341	$57,477	138,028	60,176
8	Seminole	$29,795	$58,971	$70,597	422,718	164,706
9	Lee	$29,445	$50,014	$58,950	618,754	259,818
10	Nassau	$29,089	$58,712	$66,233	73,314	28,794
11	Pinellas	$28,742	$45,258	$58,335	916,542	415,876
12	Broward	$28,631	$51,694	$62,619	1,748,066	686,047
13	Okaloosa	$28,621	$54,242	$64,224	180,822	72,379
14	Manatee	$28,072	$47,812	$57,547	322,833	135,729
15	Walton	$27,746	$47,273	$56,282	55,043	22,301
16	Brevard	$27,606	$49,523	$60,842	543,376	229,692
	United States	$27,334	$51,914	$62,982	308,745,538	116,716,292
17	Hillsborough	$27,062	$49,536	$59,886	1,229,226	474,030
18	Charlotte	$26,938	$45,037	$52,533	159,978	73,370
19	Clay	$26,872	$61,185	$67,922	190,865	68,792
	Florida	$26,551	$47,661	$57,204	18,801,310	7,420,802
20	Duval	$25,854	$49,463	$60,114	864,263	342,450
21	Leon	$25,803	$44,490	$66,157	275,487	110,945
22	Orange	$25,490	$50,138	$57,473	1,145,956	421,847
23	Santa Rosa	$25,384	$55,129	$62,929	151,372	56,910
24	Lake	$25,323	$46,477	$55,935	297,052	121,289
25	Bay	$25,033	$47,770	$56,877	168,852	68,438
26	Flagler	$24,939	$48,090	$54,754	95,696	39,186
27	Volusia	$24,768	$44,400	$55,569	494,593	208,236
28	Alachua	$24,741	$40,644	$61,188	247,336	100,516
29	Sumter	$24,180	$43,079	$51,268	93,420	41,361
30	Pasco	$24,164	$44,228	$53,457	464,697	189,612
31	Escambia	$23,474	$43,573	$53,495	297,619	116,238
32	St. Lucie	$23,296	$45,196	$51,943	277,789	108,523
33	Miami-Dade	$22,957	$43,605	$50,065	2,496,435	867,352
34	Hernando	$22,775	$42,011	$50,135	172,778	71,745
35	Citrus	$22,551	$37,933	$45,568	141,236	63,304
36	Marion	$22,384	$40,339	$47,614	331,298	137,726
37	Wakulla	$21,892	$53,301	$63,924	30,776	10,490
38	Polk	$21,881	$43,946	$51,395	602,095	227,485
39	Franklin	$21,005	$36,490	$46,083	11,549	4,254
40	Osceola	$20,536	$46,328	$50,203	268,685	90,603
41	Okeechobee	$19,664	$38,339	$43,229	39,996	14,013
42	Jefferson	$19,647	$41,359	$47,059	14,761	5,646
43	Baker	$19,593	$47,276	$55,597	27,115	8,772
44	Highlands	$19,579	$34,946	$41,955	98,786	42,604
45	Columbia	$19,366	$38,214	$47,726	67,531	24,941
46	Suwannee	$18,782	$36,352	$45,012	41,551	15,953
47	Levy	$18,703	$35,737	$43,256	40,801	16,404
48	Taylor	$18,649	$37,408	$46,012	22,570	7,920
49	Washington	$18,470	$36,216	$46,742	24,896	8,864
50	Putnam	$18,402	$34,645	$43,184	74,364	29,409
51	Gilchrist	$18,309	$37,039	$43,994	16,939	6,121
52	Lafayette	$18,069	$46,445	$54,024	8,870	2,580
53	Gulf	$17,968	$39,178	$46,979	15,863	5,335
54	Glades	$17,872	$39,429	$44,046	12,884	4,533
55	Jackson	$17,177	$38,257	$49,600	49,746	17,417
56	Dixie	$17,066	$32,312	$39,914	16,422	6,316
57	Liberty	$17,003	$40,777	$48,750	8,365	2,525
58	Bradford	$16,997	$41,126	$47,583	28,520	9,479
59	Gadsden	$16,843	$35,728	$46,773	46,389	16,952
60	Madison	$16,346	$37,459	$46,791	19,224	6,985
61	DeSoto	$15,989	$35,979	$38,986	34,862	11,445
62	Hamilton	$15,794	$37,613	$46,616	14,799	4,617
63	Holmes	$15,285	$32,247	$42,731	19,927	7,354
64	Calhoun	$15,091	$31,699	$39,332	14,625	5,061
65	Hendry	$14,734	$37,298	$38,564	39,140	12,025
66	Hardee	$14,668	$37,466	$43,001	27,731	8,245
67	Union	$13,657	$41,794	$53,469	15,535	4,048
