= November 2023 Central Florida floods =

2023 flash flood event in Florida, United States

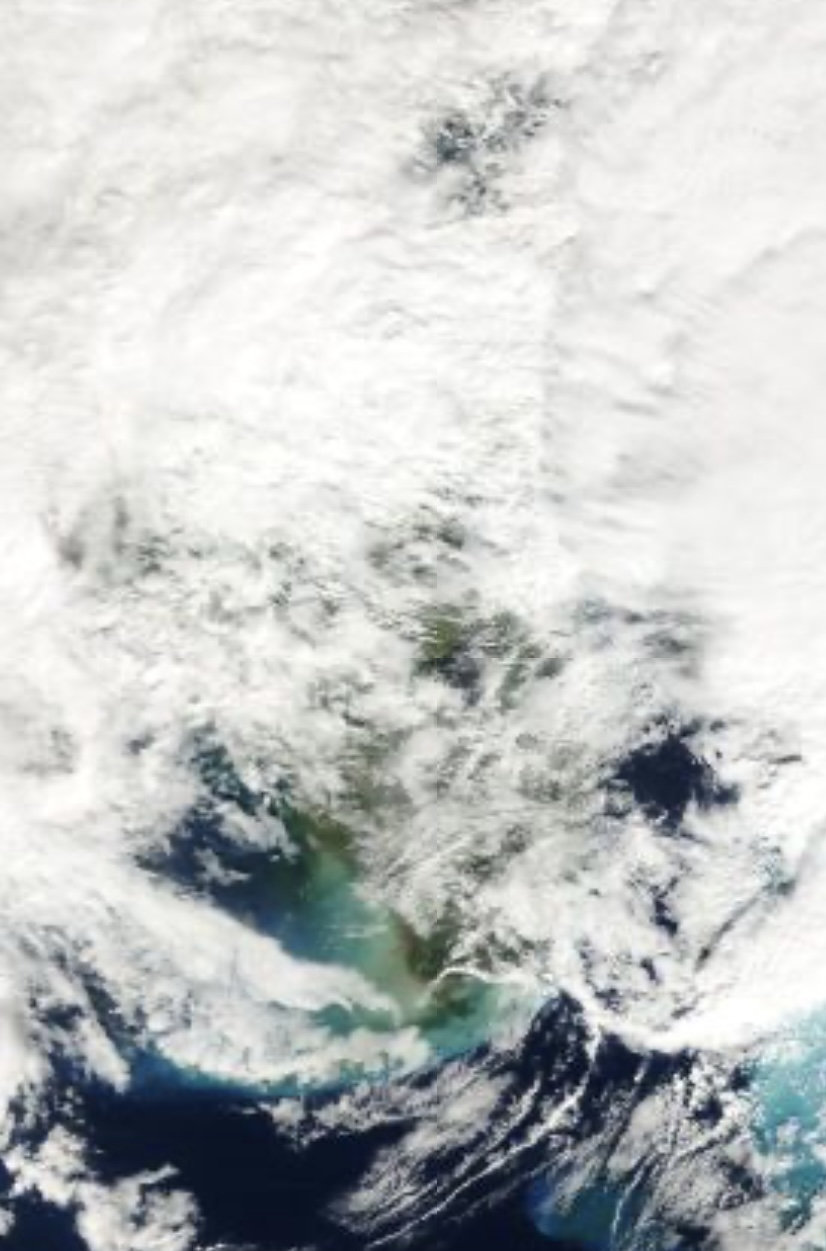
- Storm system responsible for the floods seen from satellite on November 16, 2023

Meteorological history
- Duration: November 16 – 19, 2023 (4 days)

Flood
- Highest winds: 40 mph (65km/h)
- Max. rainfall: 14.24 inches (362 mm)

Overall effects
- Fatalities: None
- Damage: >$59 million (2023 USD)
- Areas affected: Central Florida (Particularly Brevard County and Indian River County)

In November 2023, a significant flash flood event occurred in Central Florida after excessive rainfall struck the region. The hardest hit areas were: Fellsmere, which received 14 inches (360 mm) of rainfall, Vero Lake Estates, which received 11 inches (280 mm) of rainfall, and Palm Bay, which received 11 inches (280 mm) of rainfall.

The flood in November 2023 was the most significant in Fellsmere's history, breaking previous rainfall records. 24-hour rainfall records for November were also broken in Lake Mary, Sanford, and Palm Bay.

== Flood event ==
=== Meteorological synopsis ===
On November 15, 2023, as an upper trough approached the state, a mesoscale low pressure system formed south of Miami. This low-pressure system drifted towards the Bahamas before being picked up by the upper trough and stalling over east-central Florida. In the late afternoon of November 16, a line of storms began to develop from the low and moved around 5 miles per hour (8.0 km/h).

=== Flooding timeline ===
A flood watch was issued at 11:00 (EST) for Indian River and Brevard Counties. At around 17:00 (EST), a strong storm developed about 7 miles NW of Fellsmere, moving south at 5 miles per hour (8.0 km/h). The storm stalled near the intersection of I-95 and C.R. 512 in Vero Lake Estates around 19:00 (EST).

The storm dropped an estimated 5 inches (130 mm) of rain per hour according to the National Weather Service. A Flash Flood Warning was never issued despite the extreme rainfall rates and flooding that occurred. Instead, a flood advisory and later a flood warning were issued.

At the same time, heavy rainfall was occurring to the northwest in Orange County and Seminole County, which triggered flood advisories and flood warnings for areas around the St. Johns River.

Early on November 17, the Indian River County Emergency Management Services reported ‘catastrophic’ flooding conditions in Vero Lake Estates. Early on November 17, the flood warning was extended for the area due to ongoing flooding.

The St. Johns River at Astor in Lake County overflowed and flooded the community due to heavy rainfall, which continued through November 20.

== Impact ==
Total damage estimates for the floods exceed $59 million.

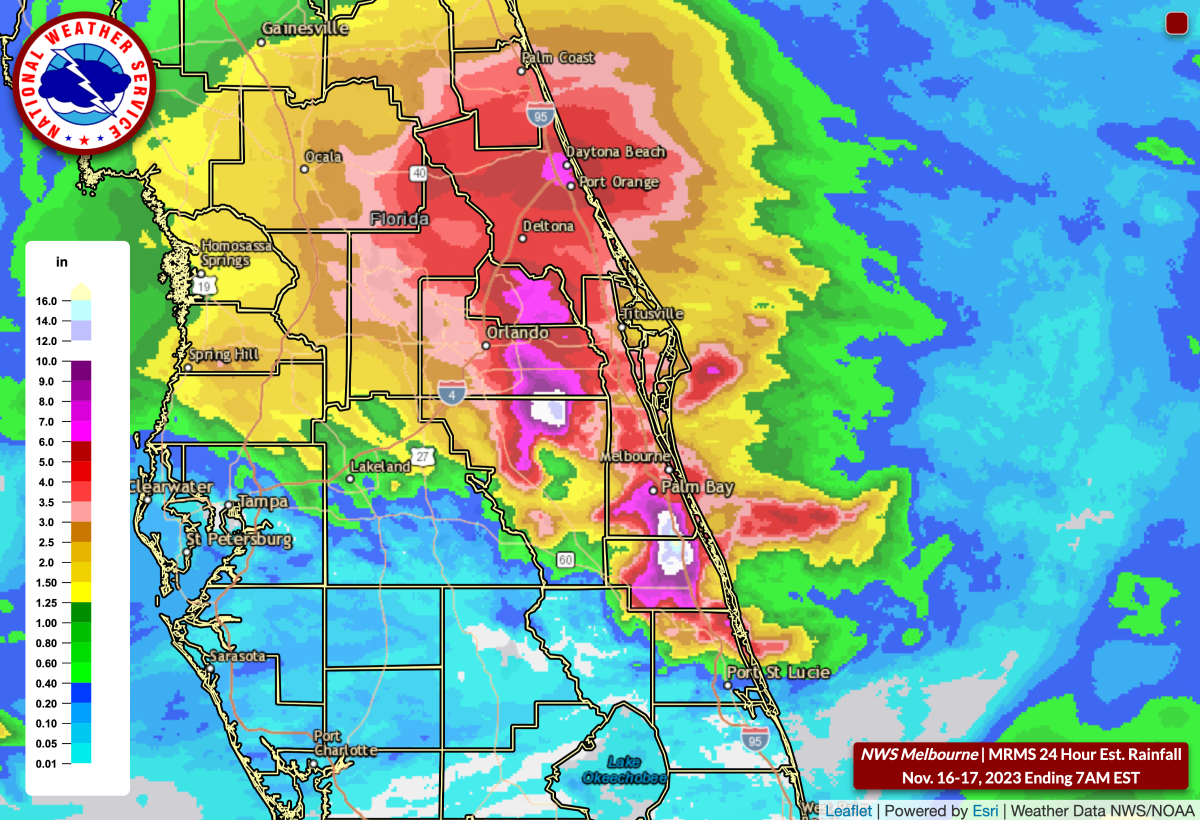
Map of rainfall totals across Central Florida

=== Brevard County ===
==== Palm Bay ====
In Palm Bay rainfall totals exceeded 11 inches, with unofficial estimates as high as 20 inches of rainfall. More than 40 cars were stranded in Palm Bay by floodwaters.

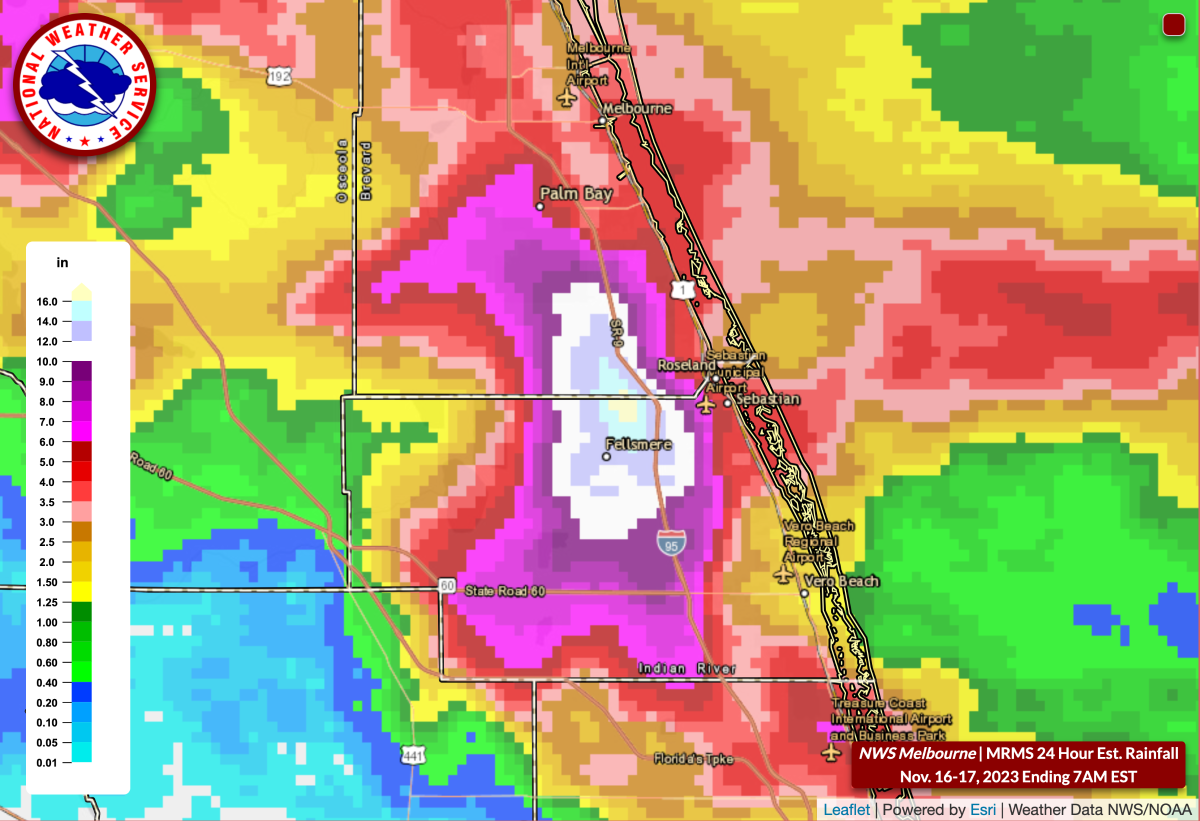
Map of rainfall totals in Brevard and Indian River Counties

=== Indian River County ===
==== Fellsmere ====
In Fellsmere, significant damage occurred in the downtown area due to the flooding. The Marsh Landing restaurant on Broadway Street was damaged in the floods. Four vehicles became stranded near the restaurant, leading to a high water rescue taking place.

Pennsylvania Avenue and Broadway Street, two major roads in downtown Fellsmere, were closed during the flooding. Sections of County Road 512 were also closed due to flooding. Parts of Fellsmere were flooded by as much as 3 feet (0.91 m) of water.

Several homes were flooded as well. Fellsmere Elementary School was closed on November 17 due to the flooding. Eight residents were left displaced by the floodwaters and The American Red Cross assisted in the relief efforts.

==== Vero Lake Estates ====
Vero Lake Estates, (known as VLE locally), was also significantly impacted by the floods. Parts of VLE received up to 11 inches (280 mm) of rainfall on November 16. Multiple vehicles were lifted and carried away by the floodwaters.

Many ditches also overflowed during the floods. In parts of the community, it took as many as four days for the flooding to recede.

Flooding in Vero Lake Estates on November 17

The lack of paved roads in the neighborhood likely played a role in the severe flooding. Two main roads in VLE, 101st Avenue and 87th Street, were closed on November 17 as a result of the floodwaters.

=== Osceola County ===
==== St. Cloud ====
In St. Cloud 8.03 inches (204 mm) of rain fell on November 16, which caused flash flooding to occur near the city along the Kissimmee River.

=== Orange County ===
==== Orlando ====
At Orlando International Airport, 3.48 inches (88 mm) of rain fell which was the fifth wettest day on record for November. An automated rain gauge in Orlando recorded 6.24 inches (158 mm) of rain on November 16.

=== Seminole County ===
==== Sanford ====
Sanford broke its previous 24-hour rainfall total for November, reaching 7.09 inches of rain. Minor flooding occurred near Lake Jesup.

==== Lake Mary ====
Like in Sanford, the 24-hour rainfall record for November was broken in Lake Mary, reaching 9.49 inches of rainfall between 07:00 (EST) on November 16 and 07:00 (EST) on November 17. This was the highest rainfall total recorded in the county from this storm system.

=== Lake County ===
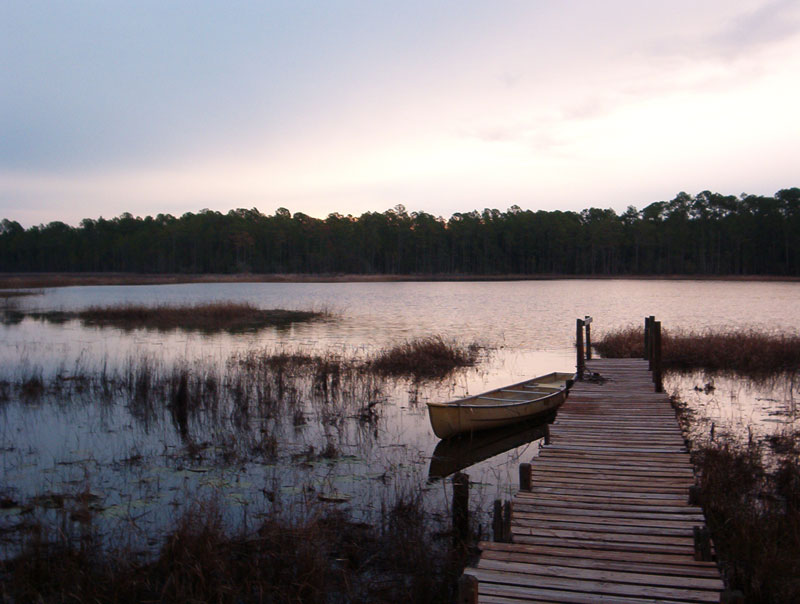
St. Johns River at Astor

In eastern Lake County, St. Johns River at Astor overflowed its banks, severely flooding the community. A flood warning was issued for the area on November 15. The river crested at 3.04 feet in moderate flood stage, a historic crest for the area.

=== Volusia County ===
7.53 inches of rain fell in DeLand; however, no flooding was reported in the city. Several other significant rainfall totals occurred in Volusia County, with 7.24 inches of rain in De Leon Springs, and 7.14 inches of rain in Port Orange.

== Aftermath ==
Fellsmere has a long and destructive history of flooding. There have been minor floods in September 2022, November 2022, and July 2023, with major floods in September 2017 and November 2023.

Many residents have criticized the city of Fellsmere's drainage system for its role in exacerbating flooding. In 2024, the city of Fellsmere invested $1.3 million to improve canals, preventing further flooding.

Fellsmere is a rural and agricultural community. Many farms lost crops in the flood, as the flood occurred during harvesting season.

== See also ==
- 2023 Fort Lauderdale floods
- November 2026 Florida floods
