= Blue Cypress Lake =

Lake in the state of Florida, United States

- Location within Florida Location within the United States
- Location: Indian River County, near Fellsmere, Florida
- Coordinates: 27°45′15″N 80°44′37″W
- Primary outflows: St. Johns River
- Basin countries: United States
- Surface area: 6,500 acres (2,600 ha)
- Average depth: 8 ft (2.4 m)

Blue Cypress Lake, originally called Lake Wilmington, is a lake in Indian River County of the Treasure Coast in Florida. It is the largest lake in the Treasure Coast and Indian River County. It is the headwaters lake of the St. Johns River. The sources of water are several creeks from the south (Mudfish Slough, Padget Branch, Holman Canal, and Fisher Creek), two from the west (Trim Creek, Blue Cypress Creek), and Moonshine Bay from the North that flow into the lake. All the water flows out of the lake to the northwest into M Canal and Zigzag Canal. The lake is over 6,500 acres (26 km^{2}) in size, 21 mi (34 km) in circumference, and has an average depth of 8 feet (2.4 m). The lake is 2,100 acres (8.5 km^{2}) larger than Lake Washington, 27 mi (43 km) north of this lake. The lake's name comes from the blue appearance of the cypress trees as the morning sun's rays reflect off the water. A fishing camp called Blue Cypress Lakeside Cabins is 4 mi (6.4 km) off State Road 60. The Blue Cypress Village (about 70 units) is south of the small boat canal from the fish camp.

== Amenities on Blue Cypress Lake ==
A boat ramp, dock, picnic area and restrooms are adjacent at the Lakefront Park.

Blue Cypress Lakeside Cabins offers waterfront cabins and manufactured homes to rent daily and weekly. Located at the westernmost point of the lake, this fish camp is located in Blue Cypress Village, a hamlet on the lake which has only 3 streets, 73rd Place, 73rd Lane, and 73rd Manor. It is 24 mi (39 km) from Fellsmere by road.

== Geography ==
Blue Cypress Lake is located at 27°45′15″N 80°44′37″W. It is the headwaters of the St. Johns River. The lake is over 6,500 acres (26 km^{2}) in size. It is directly west of Fellsmere, 11 miles (18 km) away. To the north is Palm Bay, to the west is Yeehaw Junction, and to the east is Fellsmere.

== See also ==
- List of lakes of the St. Johns River
- Lake Washington, FL
- St. Johns River
- Fellsmere, Florida
- Yeehaw Junction, Florida
