= Fellsmere, Florida =

- City
- City of Fellsmere
- Location in Indian River County and the state of Florida
- Coordinates: 27°45′40″N 80°36′35″W
- Country: United States
- State: Florida
- County: Indian River
- Incorporated: 1911

Area
  - Total: 57.79 sq mi (149.67 km^{2})
  - Land: 57.58 sq mi (149.13 km^{2})
  - Water: 0.21 sq mi (0.54 km^{2})
- Elevation: 23 ft (7.0 m)

Population (2020)
  - Total: 4,834
  - Density: 83.9/sq mi (32.41/km^{2})
- Time zone: UTC-5 (Eastern (EST))
  - Summer (DST): UTC-4 (EDT)
- ZIP code: 32948
- Area code: 772
- FIPS code: 12-22100
- GNIS feature ID: 2403605
- Website: www.cityoffellsmere.org

Fellsmere is a city in Indian River County, Florida, United States. It is part of the Sebastian–Vero Beach Metropolitan Statistical Area. The population was 4,834 at the 2020 census.

It is home of the Fellsmere Frog Leg Festival and was home to the now closed National Elephant Center. Fellsmere is the first place in Florida where women were allowed to vote. In a municipal election on June 19, 1915, resident Zena M. Dreier became the first woman to legally cast a ballot in the American South, five years before the 19th Amendment established women's suffrage nationally.

On November 16, 2023, historic rainfall hit Fellsmere and surrounding areas causing significant flooding in the city.

== History ==
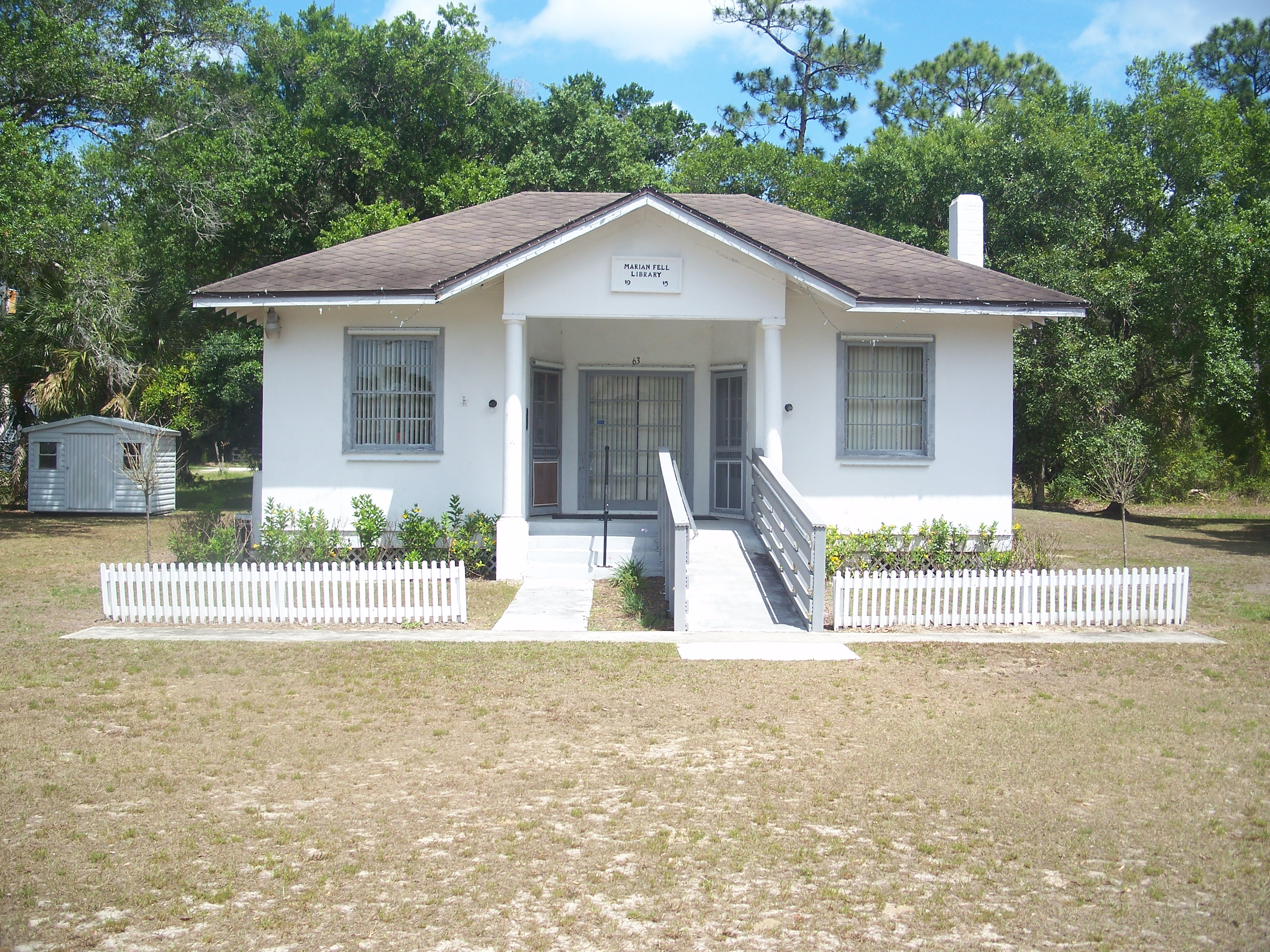
Fellsmere Library

In 1915, Fellsmere became the first municipality in Florida (or anywhere south of the Mason–Dixon line) to grant women the right to vote. It also, at the same time, held the first election in which corporations could vote. Mrs. Zena M. Dreier was the first woman to cast a vote in the city, and E. Nelson Fell cast a vote on behalf of his company Fellsmere Farms. The city had unanimously adopted a charter in February 1915, which granted these rights, and the city charter was ratified by the state legislature without any notice being paid to this provision. This, despite the fact that several statewide suffrage measures had failed in the legislature that year. Women's suffrage was not granted nationally in the United States until five years later, in August 1920, with the passage of the 19th Amendment.

=== 2023 Fellsmere Floods ===
On November 16, 2023, Fellsmere experienced major flooding after nearly 14 inches of rain fell in the area. These floods came only four months after flooding on July 31, 2023.

== Geography ==
The City of Fellsmere is located in central Indian River county.

- To the north: Palm Bay
- To the west: Blue Cypress Lake
- To the east: Sebastian

According to the United States Census Bureau, the city has a total area of 57.7 square miles (149.4 km^{2}), of which 57.5 square miles (148.9 km^{2}) are land and 0.2 square miles (0.5 km^{2}), or 0.45%, are water.

== Demographics ==
Historical population
Census	Pop.	Note	%±
1920	333		—
1930	356		6.9%
1940	643		80.6%
1950	649		0.9%
1960	732		12.8%
1970	813		11.1%
1980	1,161		42.8%
1990	2,179		87.7%
2000	3,813		75.0%
2010	5,197		36.3%
2020	4,834		−7.0%
U.S. Decennial Census

=== Racial and ethnic composition ===
Fellsmere city, Florida – Racial and ethnic composition Note: the US Census treats Hispanic/Latino as an ethnic category. This table excludes Latinos from the racial categories and assigns them to a separate category. Hispanics/Latinos may be of any race.
Race / Ethnicity (NH = Non-Hispanic)	Pop 2000	Pop 2010	Pop 2020	% 2000	% 2010	% 2020
White alone (NH)	739	691	545	19.38%	13.30%	11.27%
Black or African American alone (NH)	253	246	299	6.64%	4.73%	6.19%
Native American or Alaska Native alone (NH)	6	15	3	0.16%	0.29%	0.06%
Asian alone (NH)	4	5	3	0.10%	0.10%	0.06%
Native Hawaiian or Pacific Islander alone (NH)	2	1	4	0.05%	0.02%	0.08%
Other race alone (NH)	0	3	15	0.00%	0.06%	0.31%
Mixed race or Multiracial (NH)	19	21	55	0.50%	0.40%	1.14%
Hispanic or Latino (any race)	2,790	4,215	3,910	73.17%	81.10%	80.89%
Total	3,813	5,197	4,834	100.00%	100.00%	100.00%

=== 2020 census ===
As of the 2020 census, Fellsmere had a population of 4,834. The median age was 28.7 years. 32.3% of residents were under the age of 18 and 6.5% of residents were 65 years of age or older. For every 100 females there were 104.2 males, and for every 100 females age 18 and over there were 105.5 males age 18 and over.

0.0% of residents lived in urban areas, while 100.0% lived in rural areas.

There were 1,311 households in Fellsmere, of which 57.6% had children under the age of 18 living in them. Of all households, 55.0% were married-couple households, 16.0% were households with a male householder and no spouse or partner present, and 22.2% were households with a female householder and no spouse or partner present. About 9.3% of all households were made up of individuals and 2.9% had someone living alone who was 65 years of age or older.

There were 1,431 housing units, of which 8.4% were vacant. The homeowner vacancy rate was 0.1% and the rental vacancy rate was 6.3%.

=== 2010 census ===
As of the 2010 United States census, there were 5,197 people, 1,323 households, and 1,137 families residing in the city.

=== 2000 census ===
As of the census of 2000, there were 3,813 people, 865 households, and 718 families residing in the city. The population density was 277.8 people/km^{2} (719 people/mi^{2}). There were 918 housing units at an average density of 66.9 units/km^{2} (173 units/mi^{2}). The racial makeup of the city was 60.11% White, 6.69% African American, 0.47% Native American, 0.10% Asian, 0.05% Pacific Islander, 30.68% from other races, and 1.89% from two or more races. Hispanic or Latino of any race were 70.0% of the population.

In 2000, there were 865 households, out of which 52.6% had children under the age of 18 living with them, 66.6% were married couples living together, 8.7% had a female householder with no husband present, and 16.9% were non-families. 12.0% of all households were made up of individuals, and 5.0% had someone living alone who was 65 years of age or older. The average household size was 3.94 and the average family size was 4.18.

In 2000, in the city, the population was spread out, with 33.3% under the age of 18, 15.4% from 18 to 24, 32.8% from 25 to 44, 13.0% from 45 to 64, and 5.5% who were 65 years of age or older. The median age was 26 years. For every 100 females, there were 139.5 males. For every 100 females age 18 and over, there were 149.8 males.

In 2000, the median income for a household in the city was $30,395, and the median income for a family was $31,318. Males had a median income of $19,195 versus $15,521 for females. The per capita income for the city was $10,258. About 21.7% of families and 24.3% of the population were below the poverty line, including 25.2% of those under age 18 and 12.9% of those age 65 or over.

== Local economy ==
The large Hispanic population of Fellsmere owes to the surrounding agriculture industry, namely citrus groves and other crop types. In the city, many locally owned niche businesses thrive, including restaurants, ethnic food, architectural salvage, gifts, guitar, and motorized vehicle repair establishments.

== Public transportation ==
Fellsmere is served by the #10 bus route of GoLine, providing service to the North County Transit Hub.

The first railroad to reach Fellsmere was the narrow-gauge Sebastian-Cincinnatus Railroad, built by the sons of printing magnate Anthony Octavius Russell. It was replaced by the standard-gauge Fellsmere Railroad in 1910. The line was later extended west to the now-gone town of Broadmoor before being bought by the Trans-Florida Central Railroad in 1924. The line was abandoned in 1952.
