= Nevins, Florida =

- Unincorporated community
- Location within Florida Location within the United States
- Coordinates: 27°36′42″N 80°23′06″W
- Country: United States
- State: Florida
- County: Indian River
- Elevation: 10 ft (3.0 m)
- Time zone: UTC-5 (Eastern (EST))
  - Summer (DST): UTC-4 (EDT)
- ZIP code: 32962, 32968
- Area code: 772
- GNIS feature ID: 295482

Nevins is an unincorporated community in Indian River County, Florida, United States. It is part of the state's Atlantic coastal region.
