= Roseland, Florida =

- Census-designated place
- Interactive map of Roseland, Florida
- Coordinates: 27°49′45″N 80°29′40″W
- Country: United States
- State: Florida
- County: Indian River

Area
  - Total: 3.22 sq mi (8.33 km^{2})
  - Land: 1.89 sq mi (4.90 km^{2})
  - Water: 1.32 sq mi (3.43 km^{2})
- Elevation: 16 ft (4.9 m)

Population (2020)
  - Total: 1,591
  - Density: 841.6/sq mi (324.93/km^{2})
- Time zone: UTC-5 (Eastern (EST))
  - Summer (DST): UTC-4 (EDT)
- ZIP code: 32957
- Area code: 772
- FIPS code: 12-61875
- GNIS feature ID: 2403493

Roseland is an unincorporated community and census-designated place (CDP) in Indian River County, Florida, United States. As of the 2020 census, Roseland had a population of 1,591. It is part of the Sebastian–Vero Beach Metropolitan Statistical Area .

== Geography ==
Roseland is located in northern Indian River County. It is bordered to the north by the St. Sebastian River, which forms the Brevard County line. The city of Sebastian is to the south, and unincorporated Micco is to the north, in Brevard County. To the east is the Indian River and Pelican Island National Wildlife Refuge.

U.S. Route 1 passes through the east side of Roseland, leading north 19 miles (31 km) to Melbourne and south 15 miles (24 km) to Vero Beach.

According to the United States Census Bureau, the Roseland CDP has a total area of 3.1 square miles (8.0 km^{2}), of which 1.9 square miles (4.9 km^{2}) are land and 1.2 square miles (3.1 km^{2}), or 38.38%, are water.

== Demographics ==
Historical population
Census	Pop.	Note	%±
2020	1,591		—
U.S. Decennial Census

=== 2020 census ===
As of the 2020 census, Roseland had a population of 1,591. The median age was 62.7 years. 8.5% of residents were under the age of 18 and 43.6% of residents were 65 years of age or older. For every 100 females there were 100.6 males, and for every 100 females age 18 and over there were 100.7 males age 18 and over.

100.0% of residents lived in urban areas, while 0.0% lived in rural areas.

There were 797 households in Roseland, of which 11.3% had children under the age of 18 living in them. Of all households, 46.5% were married-couple households, 21.1% were households with a male householder and no spouse or partner present, and 24.8% were households with a female householder and no spouse or partner present. About 33.3% of all households were made up of individuals and 19.8% had someone living alone who was 65 years of age or older.

There were 970 housing units, of which 17.8% were vacant. The homeowner vacancy rate was 3.7% and the rental vacancy rate was 12.9%.

Racial composition as of the 2020 census
Race	Number	Percent
White	1,444	90.8%
Black or African American	15	0.9%
American Indian and Alaska Native	2	0.1%
Asian	12	0.8%
Native Hawaiian and Other Pacific Islander	1	0.1%
Some other race	17	1.1%
Two or more races	100	6.3%
Hispanic or Latino (of any race)	71	4.5%

=== 2000 census ===
As of the 2000 census, there were 1,775 people, 842 households, and 506 families residing in the CDP. The population density was 893.3 inhabitants per square mile (344.9/km^{2}). There were 987 housing units at an average density of 496.7 per square mile (191.8/km^{2}). The racial makeup of the CDP was 96.68% White, 0.23% African American, 0.28% Native American, 1.35% Asian, 0.56% from other races, and 0.90% from two or more races. Hispanic or Latino of any race were 1.24% of the population.

There were 842 households, out of which 15.1% had children under the age of 18 living with them, 50.8% were married couples living together, 6.8% had a female householder with no husband present, and 39.8% were non-traditional families or individuals. 34.0% of all households were made up of individuals, and 20.7% had someone living alone who was 65 years of age or older. The average household size was 2.05 and the average family size was 2.58.

In the CDP, the population was spread out, with 13.2% under the age of 18, 4.7% from 18 to 24, 19.0% from 25 to 44, 27.5% from 45 to 64, and 35.6% who were 65 years of age or older. The median age was 54 years. For every 100 females, there were 93.4 males. For every 100 females age 18 and over, there were 92.0 males.

The median income for a household in the CDP was $28,188, and the median income for a family was $34,853. Males had a median income of $30,326 versus $27,188 for females. The per capita income for the CDP was $18,084. About 9.1% of families and 18.7% of the population were below the poverty line, including 42.2% of those under age 18 and 7.2% of those age 65 or over.

== Notable person ==
- Arlo Guthrie, the folk singer of Alice's Restaurant, owns a home here.
