= Wabasso Beach, Florida =

Place in Florida, United States

- CDP
- Location in Indian River County and the state of Florida
- Coordinates: 27°45′12″N 80°23′48″W
- Country: United States
- State: Florida
- County: Indian River

Area
  - Total: 1.23 sq mi (3.18 km^{2})
  - Land: 1.21 sq mi (3.14 km^{2})
  - Water: 0.015 sq mi (0.04 km^{2})
- Elevation: 7 ft (2.1 m)

Population (2020)
  - Total: 2,194
  - Density: 1,811.2/sq mi (699.32/km^{2})
- Time zone: UTC-5 (Eastern (EST))
  - Summer (DST): UTC-4 (EDT)
- ZIP code: 32963
- Area code: 772
- FIPS code: 12-74635
- GNIS feature ID: 2402974

Wabasso Beach is a census-designated place (CDP) in Indian River County, Florida, United States. As of the 2020 census, Wabasso Beach had a population of 2,194. It is part of the Sebastian–Vero Beach Metropolitan Statistical Area.

== Geography ==
According to the United States Census Bureau, the CDP has a total area of 1.2 square miles (3.1 km^{2}), of which 1.2 square miles (3.1 km^{2}) is land and 0.04 square miles (0.10 km^{2}) (1.68%) is water.

== Demographics ==
Historical population
Census	Pop.	Note	%±
2020	2,194		—
U.S. Decennial Census

=== 2020 census ===
As of the 2020 census, Wabasso Beach had a population of 2,194. The median age was 71.3 years. 2.6% of residents were under the age of 18 and 71.9% of residents were 65 years of age or older. For every 100 females there were 83.9 males, and for every 100 females age 18 and over there were 83.1 males age 18 and over.

100.0% of residents lived in urban areas, while 0.0% lived in rural areas.

There were 1,177 households in Wabasso Beach, of which 4.7% had children under the age of 18 living in them. Of all households, 65.4% were married-couple households, 9.8% were households with a male householder and no spouse or partner present, and 20.5% were households with a female householder and no spouse or partner present. About 26.0% of all households were made up of individuals and 20.4% had someone living alone who was 65 years of age or older.

There were 1,600 housing units, of which 26.4% were vacant. The homeowner vacancy rate was 1.6% and the rental vacancy rate was 25.7%.

Racial composition as of the 2020 census
Race	Number	Percent
White	2,072	94.4%
Black or African American	5	0.2%
American Indian and Alaska Native	4	0.2%
Asian	16	0.7%
Native Hawaiian and Other Pacific Islander	0	0.0%
Some other race	9	0.4%
Two or more races	88	4.0%
Hispanic or Latino (of any race)	46	2.1%

=== 2000 census ===
As of the census of 2000, there were 1,075 people, 554 households, and 383 families residing in the CDP. The population density was 912.3 inhabitants per square mile (352.2/km^{2}). There were 865 housing units at an average density of 734.1 per square mile (283.4/km^{2}). The racial makeup of the CDP was 98.79% White, 0.09% African American, 0.09% Native American, 0.19% Asian, 0.37% from other races, and 0.47% from two or more races. Hispanic or Latino of any race were 1.02% of the population.

There were 554 households, out of which 9.7% had children under the age of 18 living with them, 64.8% were married couples living together, 3.8% had a female householder with no husband present, and 30.7% were non-families. 25.6% of all households were made up of individuals, and 15.7% had someone living alone who was 65 years of age or older. The average household size was 1.94 and the average family size was 2.28.

In the CDP, the population was spread out, with 8.5% under the age of 18, 2.0% from 18 to 24, 10.5% from 25 to 44, 32.1% from 45 to 64, and 46.9% who were 65 years of age or older. The median age was 64 years. For every 100 females, there were 94.7 males. For every 100 females age 18 and over, there were 89.2 males.

The median income for a household in the CDP was $67,072, and the median income for a family was $74,808. Males had a median income of $75,771 versus $39,464 for females. The per capita income for the CDP was $48,690. About 2.0% of families and 1.4% of the population were below the poverty line, including 14.8% of those under age 18 and none of those age 65 or over.
