= Indian River County, Florida =

County in Florida, United States

- County
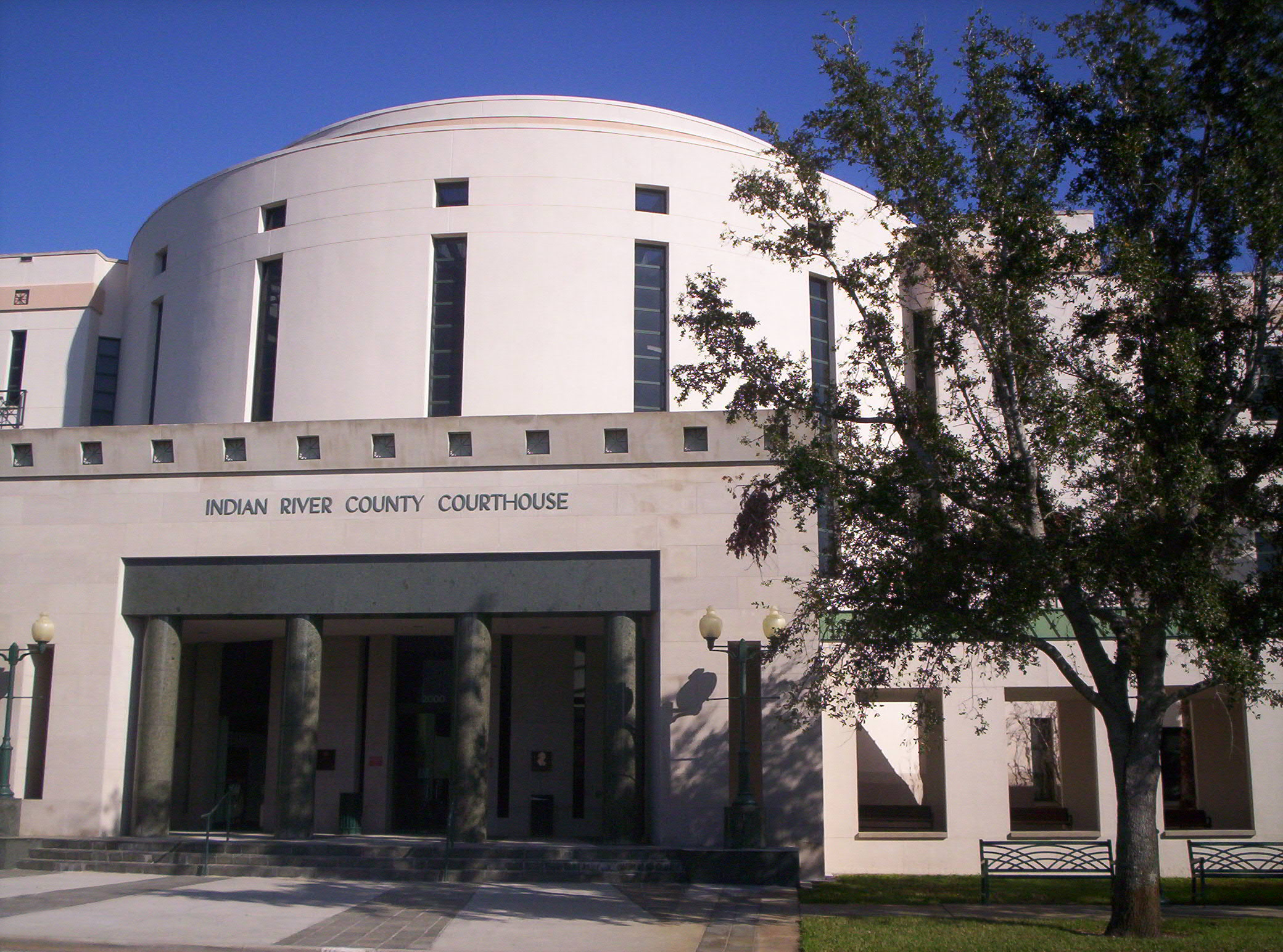
- Indian River County Courthouse in Vero Beach

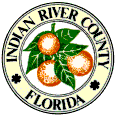
- Seal

- Location within the U.S. state of Florida
- Coordinates: 27°42′N 80°35′W
- Country: United States
- State: Florida
- Founded: May 30, 1925
- Named for: Indian River Lagoon
- Seat: Vero Beach
- Largest city: Sebastian

Area
  - Total: 617 sq mi (1,600 km^{2})
  - Land: 503 sq mi (1,300 km^{2})
  - Water: 114 sq mi (300 km^{2}) 18.5%

Population (2020)
  - Total: 159,788
  - Estimate (2025): 172,799 ▲
  - Density: 318/sq mi (123/km^{2})
- Time zone: UTC−5 (Eastern)
  - Summer (DST): UTC−4 (EDT)
- Congressional district: 8th
- Website: www.indianriver.gov

Indian River County (Spanish: Condado de Río Indio) is a county located in the southeastern and east-central portions of the U.S. state of Florida. As of the 2020 census, the population was 159,788. Its seat is Vero Beach.

Indian River County comprises the Sebastian-Vero Beach-West Vero Corridor, Florida Metropolitan Statistical Area. The MSA was first defined as the Vero Beach, Florida MSA in 2003. It was renamed Sebastian-Vero Beach, Florida MSA in 2005, and Sebastian-Vero Beach-West Vero Corridor, Florida MSA in 2023. The MSA is included in the Miami-Port St. Lucie-Fort Lauderdale, Florida, Combined Statistical Area.

On November 16–17, 2023, northern Indian River County was severely impacted by flooding after 14” of rain fell in less than 24 hours.

== History ==
Prior to 1821, the area of Indian River County was part of the Spanish colony of East Florida. In 1822, this area became part of St. Johns County, and in 1824 it became part of Mosquito County (original name of Orange County).

The Second Seminole War was fought in 1835 and from 1838 to 1839. Fort Vinton was built for this purpose near the intersection of present-day Florida State Road 60 and 122nd Avenue.

In 1844, the county's portion of Mosquito County became part of newly created St. Lucia County. In 1855, St. Lucia County was renamed Brevard County. In 1905, St. Lucie County was formed from the southern portion of Brevard County; in 1925 Indian River County was formed from the northern portion of St. Lucie County. It was named for the Indian River, which runs through the eastern portion of the county. In 2025, Indian River County celebrated its centennial for turning 100 years old.

=== 2023 Floods in North County ===
On November 16 and 17, 2023, extreme rainfall struck northern Indian River County, causing severe flooding. Fourteen inches of rain fell in Fellsmere, and eleven inches of rain fell in Vero Lake Estates.

== Hurricane history ==
Indian River County's location in East Central Florida makes it a very prone location to impacts from Hurricanes.

=== 2004 Atlantic Hurricane Season ===
Indian River County experienced devastating effects from the 2004 Atlantic Hurricane Season.

On September 5, 2004, the county was affected by the category 2 landfall of Hurricane Frances. There was wide spread power outages, flooding, and high winds.

Only 21 days later, on September 26, 2004, Hurricane Jeanne made landfall near Indian River County as a category 3 hurricane with 120 mph winds. A special Tornado Warning was issued (precursor to the Extreme Wind Warning) for Indian River County due to the right eye wall of the storm striking the county. A 122 mph wind gust was reported in Vero Beach, and 116 mph wind gust was reported in Sebastian.

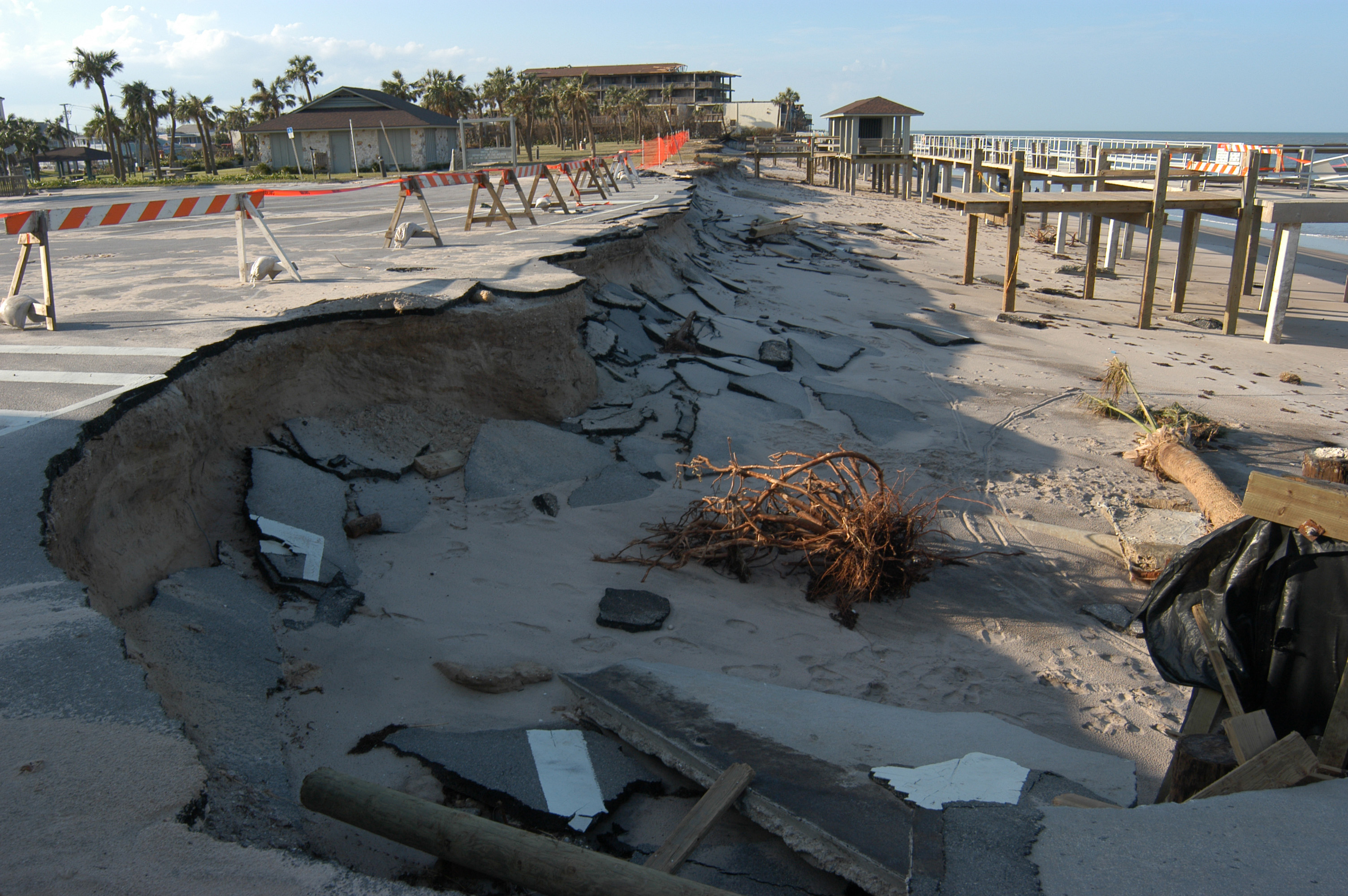
Extreme Beach Erosion in Vero Beach due to Hurricane Jeanne

“Catastrophic” beach erosion occurred on the beaches of the county after 6–8 feet of storm surge was caused by Jeanne. Widespread flooding occurred, which resulted in the closure of all barrier island bridges being closed. One fatality was caused when an elderly woman was attempting to evacuate her home in Indian River Shores. An F1 tornado touched down in West Vero Corridor causing $34,000 (2025 USD) in damage.

A staggering $3.4 billion+ (2025 USD) of damage was inflicted on Indian River County alone, easily making the storm the costliest and most destructive hurricane in Indian River County history.

=== Hurricane Nicole ===
On November 10, 2022, Hurricane Nicole made landfall near Vero Beach as a Category 1 hurricane. Mostly minor damage was reported, however, the iconic Jaycee Beach and Humiston Beach boardwalks sustained significant damage.

=== Hurricane Milton ===
==== Tornado Outbreak ====
Hurricane Milton spawning tornado outbreak in Florida on October 9

On October 9, 2024, as Hurricane Milton approached Florida, Indian River County was part of a prolific tornado outbreak spawned by Milton. Several strong tornadoes hit the county including the Port St. Lucie - Fort Pierce - Vero Beach EF3 tornado, which damaged or destroyed several homes and businesses in Florida Ridge and Vero Beach South. Severe damage occurred in the Orchid Island communities of the county, many with homes sustaining heavy damage, and several being destroyed.

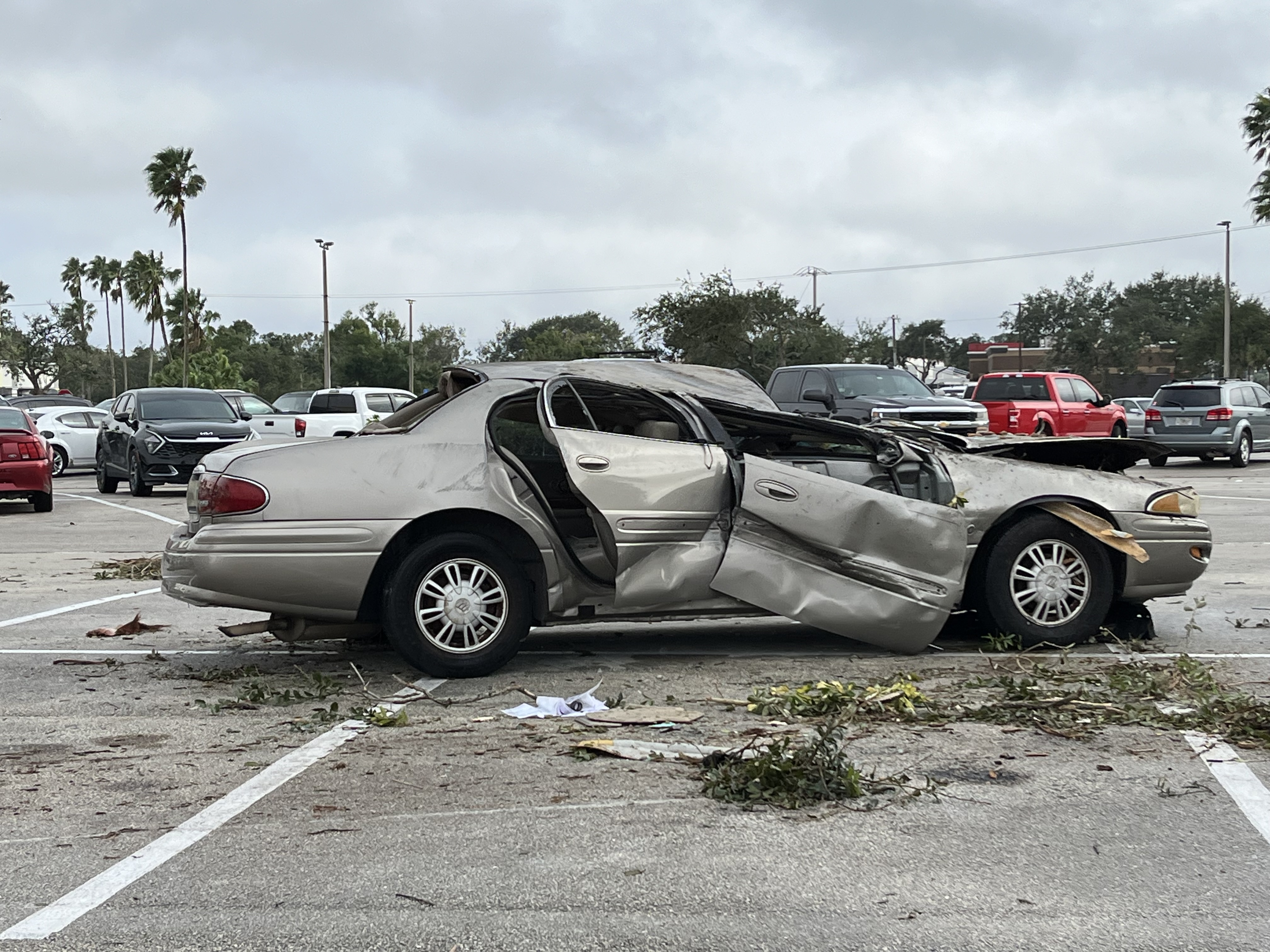
Severely damaged vehicle in Florida Ridge

Numerous other tornadoes touched down in the county, with two EF1 tornadoes hitting Downtown Vero Beach within the span of 20 minutes, causing extensive damage. An EF2 tornado touched down farther west near Blue Cypress Lake. In total, six tornadoes struck the county. In total, it is estimated that Hurricane Milton caused at least $59 million (2024 USD) in damage in Indian River County.

==== Flooding ====
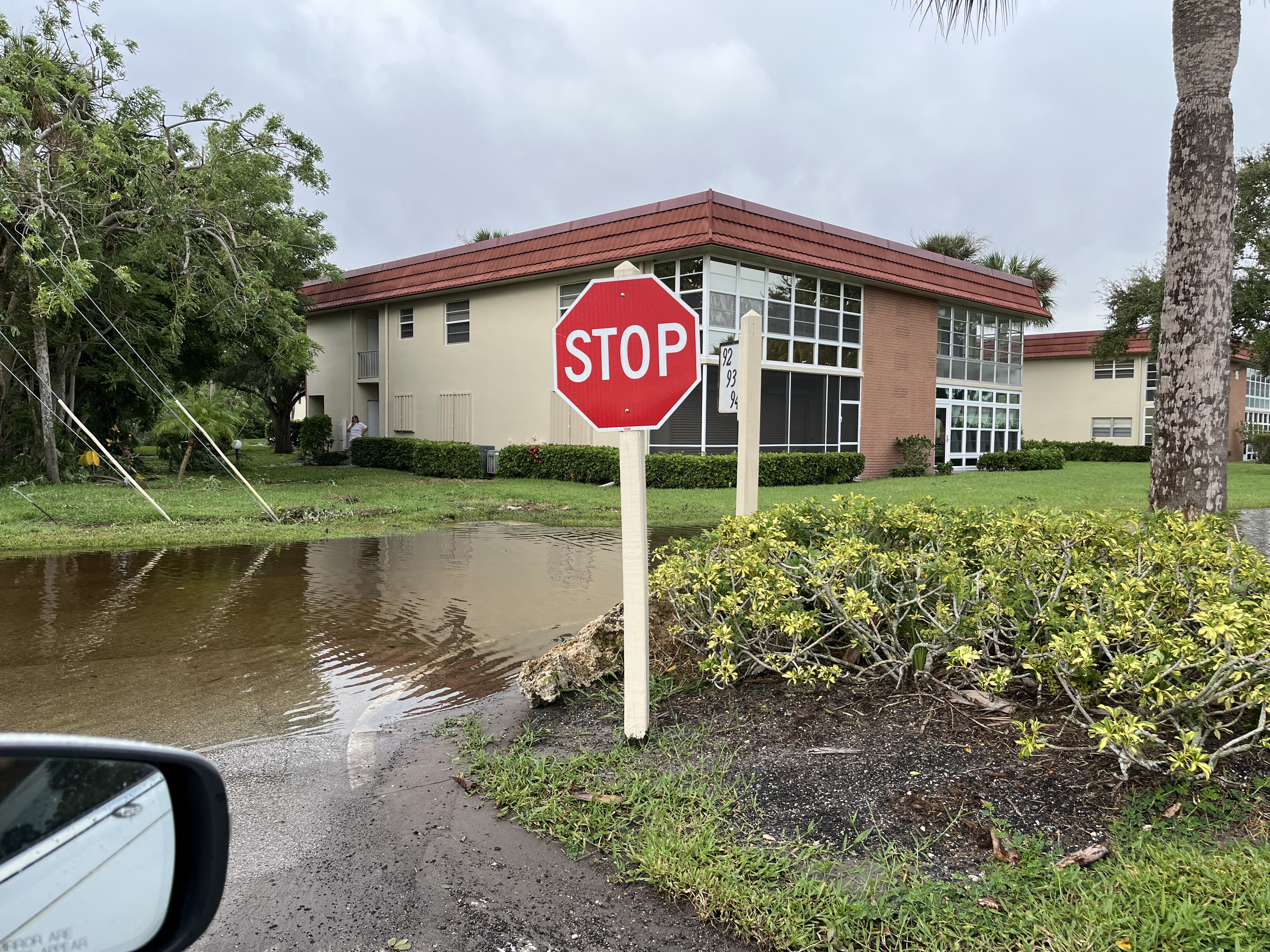
Flooding in the Vista Royale neighborhood of Vero Beach South on October 10

Torrential rainfall also occurred from Milton, causing flash flooding in the county. According to preliminary reports, 9.41 inches of rain fell in around 3 hours in Vero Beach. A flash flood warning was issued at 7PM EDT for most of eastern Indian River County due to ongoing flooding.

== Geography ==
According to the U.S. Census Bureau, the county has a total area of 617 square miles (1,600 km^{2}), of which 503 square miles (1,300 km^{2}) is land and 114 square miles (300 km^{2}) (18.5%) is water. Indian River County is the ninth-smallest county in Florida by area.

=== Adjacent counties ===
- Brevard County - north
- St. Lucie County - south
- Okeechobee County - southwest
- Osceola County - northwest

=== National protected areas ===
- Archie Carr National Wildlife Refuge (part)
- Pelican Island National Wildlife Refuge

=== Climate and birds ===
Eight bird species in Indian River County are listed as "highly vulnerable" to climate change:

- Red-headed woodpecker
- Gray kingbird
- Fish crow
- Brown thrasher
- Eastern towhee
- Boat-tailed grackle
- Snail kite
- Yellow-throated warbler

=== Bodies of Water ===
- Blue Cypress Lake
- Indian River Lagoon
- St. Sebastian River

== Demographics ==
Historical population
Census	Pop.	Note	%±
1930	6,724		—
1940	8,957		33.2%
1950	11,872		32.5%
1960	25,309		113.2%
1970	35,992		42.2%
1980	59,896		66.4%
1990	90,208		50.6%
2000	112,947		25.2%
2010	138,028		22.2%
2020	159,788		15.8%
2025 (est.)	172,799	▲	8.1%
U.S. Decennial Census; 1790-1960 1900-1990; 1990-2000 2010-2019

=== Racial and ethnic composition ===
Indian River County, Florida – Racial and ethnic composition Note: the US Census treats Hispanic/Latino as an ethnic category. This table excludes Latinos from the racial categories and assigns them to a separate category. Hispanics/Latinos may be of any race.
Race / Ethnicity (NH = Non-Hispanic)	Pop 1980	Pop 1990	Pop 2000	Pop 2010	Pop 2020	% 1980	% 1990	% 2000	% 2010	% 2020
White alone (NH)	50,437	79,349	94,250	106,780	117,422	84.21%	87.96%	83.45%	77.36%	73.49%
Black or African American alone (NH)	7,768	7,552	9,143	12,074	13,079	12.97%	8.37%	8.09%	8.75%	8.19%
Native American or Alaska Native alone (NH)	49	124	229	277	273	0.08%	0.14%	0.20%	0.20%	0.17%
Asian alone (NH)	154	455	828	1,646	2,341	0.26%	0.50%	0.73%	1.19%	1.47%
Native Hawaiian or Pacific Islander alone (NH)	x	x	28	49	52	x	x	0.02%	0.04%	0.03%
Other race alone (NH)	106	24	82	189	730	0.18%	0.03%	0.07%	0.14%	0.46%
Mixed race or Multiracial (NH)	x	x	1,006	1,548	5,059	x	x	0.89%	1.12%	3.17%
Hispanic or Latino (any race)	1,382	2,704	7,381	15,465	20,832	2.31%	3.00%	6.53%	11.20%	13.04%
Total	59,896	90,208	112,947	138,028	159,788	100.00%	100.00%	100.00%	100.00%	100.00%

A map of the racial demographics of Indian River County, Florida by Census tract Legend: Non-Hispanic White 50–60% 60–70% 70–80% 80–90% >90% Hispanic 40–50% 60–70% Black or African American 50–60% 70–80%

=== 2020 census ===
As of the 2020 census, there were 159,788 people, 71,177 households, and 37,647 families residing in the county.

The racial makeup of the county was 76.7% White, 8.4% Black or African American, 0.3% American Indian and Alaska Native, 1.5% Asian, <0.1% Native Hawaiian and Pacific Islander, 4.3% from some other race, and 8.8% from two or more races. Hispanic or Latino residents of any race comprised 13.0% of the population.

The median age was 55.1 years. 15.9% of residents were under the age of 18, and 34.1% of residents were 65 years of age or older. For every 100 females, there were 92.3 males, and for every 100 females aged 18 and over, there were 90 males aged 18 and over.

92.8% of residents lived in urban areas, while 7.2% lived in rural areas.

There were 71,177 households in the county, of which 19.8% had children under the age of 18 living in them. Of all households, 49.7% were married-couple households, 16.3% were households with a male householder and no spouse or partner present, and 27.7% were households with a female householder and no spouse or partner present. About 29.7% of all households were made up of individuals and 18.5% had someone living alone who was 65 years of age or older.

There were 83,529 housing units, of which 14.8% were vacant. Among occupied housing units, 75.8% were owner-occupied and 24.2% were renter-occupied. The homeowner vacancy rate was 2.5% and the rental vacancy rate was 9.0%.

=== 2000 census ===
As of the 2000 census, there were 112,947 people, 49,137 households, and 32,725 families residing in the county. The population density was 224 inhabitants per square mile (86/km^{2}). There were 57,902 housing units at an average density of 115 per square mile (44/km^{2}). The racial makeup of the county was 87.43% White, 8.19% Black or African American, 0.25% Native American, 0.74% Asian, 0.03% Pacific Islander, 2.15% from other races, and 1.21% from two or more races. 6.53% of the population were Hispanic or Latino of any race.

There were 49,137 households, out of which 21.70% had children under the age of 18 living with them, 54.50% were married couples living together, 8.90% had a female householder with no husband present, and 33.40% were non-families. 28.20% of all households were made up of individuals, and 16.10% had someone living alone who was 65 years of age or older. The average household size was 2.25 and the average family size was 2.72.

In the county, the population was spread out, with 19.20% under the age of 18, 6.00% from 18 to 24, 22.30% from 25 to 44, 23.30% from 45 to 64, and 29.20% who were 65 years of age or older. The median age was 47 years. For every 100 females there were 93.70 males. For every 100 females age 18 and over, there were 90.80 males.

The median income for a household in the county was $39,635, and the median income for a family was $46,385. Males had a median income of $30,870 versus $23,379 for females. The per capita income for the county was $27,227. About 6.30% of families and 9.30% of the population were below the poverty line, including 13.60% of those under age 18 and 5.70% of those age 65 or over.

== Transportation ==
=== Airports ===
- New Hibiscus Airpark
- Sebastian Municipal Airport
- Vero Beach Regional Airport

=== Bus systems ===
GoLine is Indian River County's main method of public transportation. The program was introduced in 1994 to provide an alternative option to driving. Due to County population increases in the early and mid 2000s, Indian River County devised a series of bus routes from Barefoot Bay in southern Brevard County to the south end of Vero Beach. In 2006, GoLine (formerly known as Indian River Transit) was introduced with more stops along and through the Treasure Coast. By 2010, the GoLine system had a total of 14 stops with an additional four stops planned for 2011/2012. Riders pay no fare or fee to board the bus. In 2010 the buses operated between 8:00 A.M. and 5:00 P.M. weekdays and from 9:00 A.M. to 3:00 P.M. on Saturdays. Some routes have extended operating hours depending on location.

=== Highways ===
- I-95 is the main and only interstate highway in Indian River County. It enters from St. Lucie County in the south and contains three interchanges: Exit 156 (SR 512), and Exit 147 (SR 60), and Exit 143 (SR 606), which was opened on October 5, 2026.

Exit 143 signage seen from I-95 in October 2026

- Florida's Turnpike briefly passes through extreme western Indian River County, but has no exits in the county.
- US 1 is the main arterial road in eastern Indian River County, running north–south.
- SR A1A is the primary coastal highway in Indian River County, serving the communities of South Beach, Vero Beach, Indian River Shores, Wabasso Beach, Orchid, and North Beach.
- SR 60 is the primary east-west artery in central Indian River County. The highway heads east from Yeehaw Junction into Indian River County, where it intersects with I-95 at Exit 147. The road is also carried by the Merrill P. Barber Bridge in Vero Beach and terminates at SR A1A in Vero Beach.
- SR 510 / CR 510 is Wabasso Road. The road begins near Vero Lake Estates as CR 510 before transitioning to SR 510 at US 1 in Wabasso. SR 510 is also known as the Wabasso Causeway.
- SR 512 / CR 512 is the primary artery of northern and western Indian River County. The highway is one of two roads that connects to Fellsmere. The highway has one of three I-95 exits in the county at Exit 156. A portion of the highway from I-95 to CR 510 was redesignated SR 512 in September 2026 when the highway was transferred to the Florida Department of Transportation (FDOT).
- SR 606 (Oslo Road) is the primary artery in southern Indian River County. A partial cloverleaf interchange with I-95 was opened on October 5, 2026 at exit 143. The highway was formally designated CR 606 before being redesignated as SR 606 in September 2026.
- SR 656 (Alma Lee Loy Bridge) is also known as the 17th Street Bridge. The road connects US 1 in Vero Beach to SR A1A near South Beach.

=== Train ===
Amtrak began planning to add service along the east coast of Florida, including a station in Vero Beach, in 2000. In 2012, Amtrak announced that it hoped to start service over the Florida East Coast Railway (FEC) line in 2013. The All Aboard Florida project (now Brightline) was also announced in 2012, and now operates over part of the FEC track that Amtrak intended to use, but does not stop anywhere in Indian River County.

Florida East Coast Railway serves a team yard in Vero Beach for off-line customers that don't have direct rail service via spurs. There are two lumber and sheetrock/structural steel customers who receive boxcars, center beam and bulkhead flatcars, and occasionally- gondolas, at the team yard.

== Economy ==
Healthcare, education, government, and retail sales are important employment segments in Indian River County. As of 2024 (some numbers have not been updated since 2019), the largest employers in the county were:

Employer	Sector	Employees	Location
Cleveland Clinic Indian River Hospital	Healthcare	2,600	Vero Beach
School Board of Indian River County	Education	2,234	Vero Beach
Piper Aircraft	Manufacturing	1,500	Vero Beach
Indian River County	Government (including constitutional offices)	1,455	Vero Beach
Publix Super Markets	Retail	1,380	Multiple locations across Indian River County
Walmart	Retail	806	Sebastian, Vero Beach
Orlando Health Sebastian River Hospital	Healthcare	750	Roseland
Visiting Nurse Association	Healthcare	500	Vero Beach
John's Island	Residential development and resort	495	Indian River Shores
Indian River Estates	Retirement community	486	West Vero Corridor
CVS Warehouse	Distribution	440	West Vero Corridor
City of Vero Beach	Government	328	Vero Beach
Disney's Vero Beach Resort	Resort	279	Wabasso Beach
St. Edward's School	College-preparatory school	223	South Beach
B & W Quality Growers	Agriculture	200	Fellsmere
City of Sebastian	Government	188	Sebastian
Skyborne Airline Academy	Flight instruction	170	Vero Beach

== Libraries ==
- Indian River County Main Library, in Vero Beach
- North Indian River County Library, in Sebastian
- The Brackett Library, at the Indian River State College Mueller Campus, in Vero Beach

== Education ==
School District of Indian River County operates the public schools of Indian River County.

=== Elementary Schools ===
- Liberty Magnet Elementary School
- North County Charter School
- Sebastian Elementary School
- Pelican Island Elementary School
- Treasure Coast Elementary School
- Fellsmere Elementary School
- Beachland Elementary School
- Indian River Academy
- Glendale Elementary School
- Vero Beach Elementary School
- Rosewood Magnet School
- Osceola Magnet School
- Imagine School

=== Middle Schools ===
- Storm Grove Middle School
- Sebastian River Middle School
- Gifford Middle School
- Vero Beach Middle School
- Sebastian Charter Junior High School
- Imagine School

=== High Schools ===
- Indian River Charter High School
- Sebastian River High School
- Vero Beach High School

=== Private schools ===
- Glendale Christian School
- Indian River Christian School
- Master's Academy
- St. Edwards School
- St. Helen Catholic School
- Tabernacle Baptist School
- The Willow School
- SunCoast Primary School

=== Colleges and universities ===
- Indian River State College Mueller Center
- Indian River State College Sebastian Campus

== Elections ==
Indian River County lies at the northern end of a belt stretching to Collier County in the southwest that was the first part of Florida to politically distance itself from the "Solid South": the last Democrat to win a majority in the county was Franklin D. Roosevelt in 1944. Only four Democrats have managed 40 percent or more of the county's vote since then.

In 1992, indeed, Ross Perot came second, fifteen votes ahead of President-elect Bill Clinton, this being one of only four Florida counties where he did so.

United States presidential election results for Indian River County, Florida
Year	Republican		Democratic		Third party(ies)	
Year	No.	%	No.	%	No.	%
1928	847	55.61%	657	43.14%	19	1.25%
1932	446	25.43%	1,308	74.57%	0	0.00%
1936	532	29.52%	1,270	70.48%	0	0.00%
1940	904	37.81%	1,487	62.19%	0	0.00%
1944	759	37.01%	1,292	62.99%	0	0.00%
1948	1,134	46.32%	1,055	43.10%	259	10.58%
1952	3,055	65.94%	1,578	34.06%	0	0.00%
1956	4,059	70.49%	1,699	29.51%	0	0.00%
1960	4,656	61.05%	2,970	38.95%	0	0.00%
1964	6,191	54.72%	5,122	45.28%	0	0.00%
1968	6,518	51.25%	3,179	24.99%	3,022	23.76%
1972	11,741	77.85%	3,316	21.99%	25	0.17%
1976	9,818	52.63%	8,512	45.63%	324	1.74%
1980	15,568	62.98%	7,759	31.39%	1,390	5.62%
1984	23,716	73.08%	8,736	26.92%	0	0.00%
1988	24,630	69.71%	10,451	29.58%	252	0.71%
1992	19,140	43.54%	12,360	28.12%	12,462	28.35%
1996	22,714	51.66%	16,375	37.24%	4,883	11.10%
2000	28,639	57.71%	19,769	39.84%	1,219	2.46%
2004	36,938	60.15%	23,956	39.01%	520	0.85%
2008	40,176	56.74%	29,710	41.96%	916	1.29%
2012	43,450	60.70%	27,492	38.41%	638	0.89%
2016	48,620	60.20%	29,043	35.96%	3,106	3.85%
2020	58,872	60.23%	37,844	38.72%	1,024	1.05%
2024	62,737	63.06%	35,654	35.84%	1,102	1.11%

=== Voter registration ===
According to the Secretary of State's office, Republicans are a plurality of registered voters in Indian River County.

Indian River County Voter Registration & Party Enrollment as of July 31, 2022
Political Party	Total Voters	Percentage
Republican	57,050	48.24%
Democratic	30,487	25.78%
No party affiliation	28,005	23.68%
Minor parties	2,717	2.30%
Total	118,259	100.00%

== Communities ==
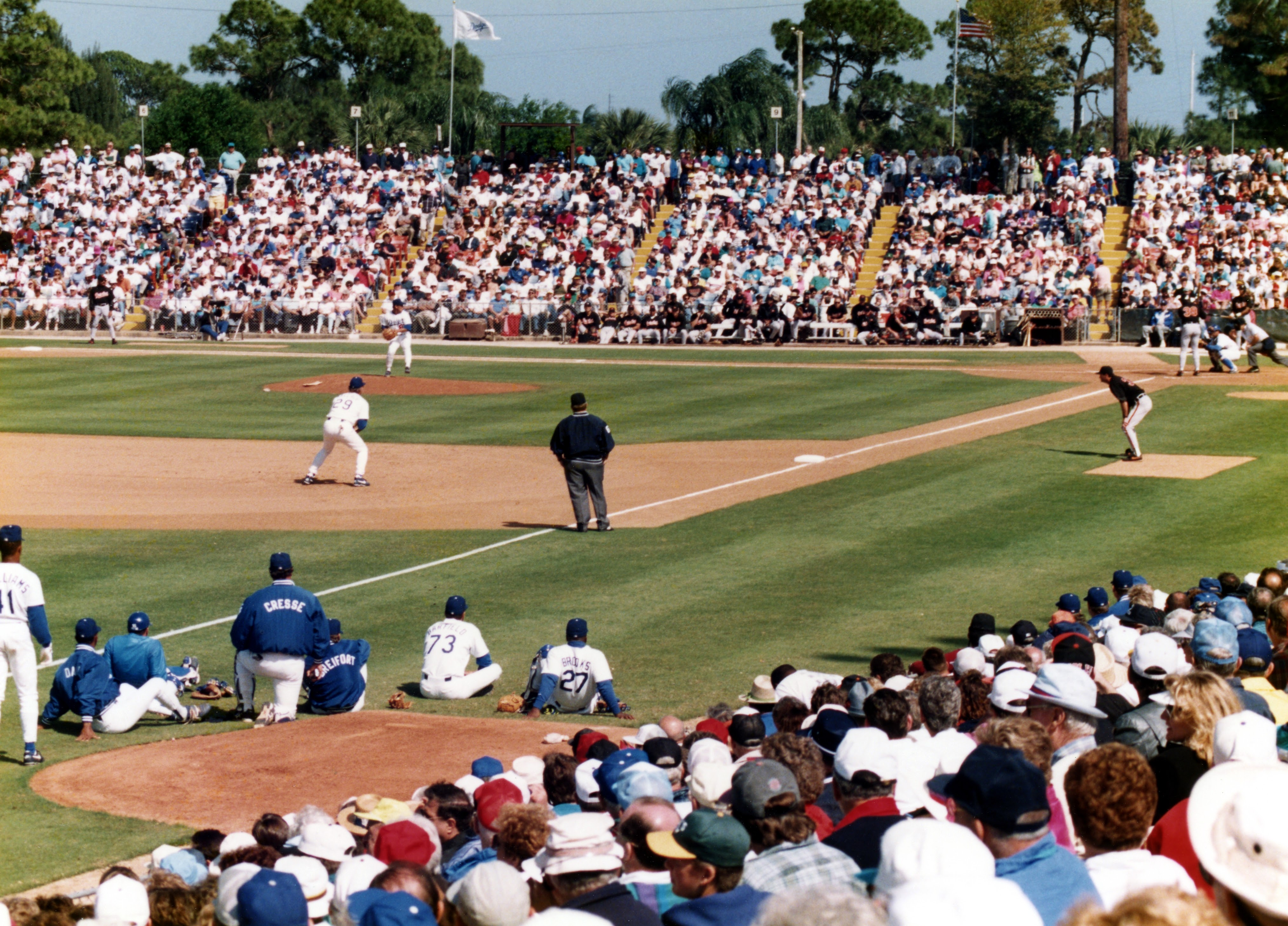
Vero Beach

=== Cities ===
- Fellsmere
- Sebastian
- Vero Beach

=== Towns ===
- Indian River Shores
- Orchid

=== Census-designated places ===
- Florida Ridge
- Gifford
- Roseland
- South Beach
- Vero Beach South
- Vero Lake Estates
- Wabasso
- Wabasso Beach
- West Vero Corridor
- Windsor (formerly North Beach)
- Winter Beach

=== Other unincorporated communities ===
- Blue Cypress Village
- Citrus Ridge
- Cummings
- Nevins
- Oslo
- Riomar
- Royal Poinciana Park

== See also ==
- National Register of Historic Places listings in Indian River County, Florida
- North Hutchinson Island
- Pelican Island National Wildlife Refuge
- Vero beach power squadron
