= Sebastian Municipal Airport =

Airport in Florida, United States

Coordinates: 27°48′47.6450″N 080°29′44.10″W

- IATA: none; ICAO: none; FAA LID: X26

Summary
- Airport type: Public use
- Owner: City of Sebastian
- Operator: Scott Baker
- Serves: Sebastian, Florida
- Location: Indian River County, Florida
- Elevation AMSL: 21 ft / 6 m
- Interactive map of Sebastian Municipal Airport

Runways
Direction	Length		Surface
Direction	ft	m	Surface
05/23	4,024	1,227	Asphalt
10/28	3,200	975	Asphalt

Statistics (1999)
- Aircraft operations: 37,242
- Based aircraft: 52
- Source: Federal Aviation Administration

Sebastian Municipal Airport (FAA LID: X26) is a public-use airport located 1 mile (1.6 km) west of the central business district of the city of Sebastian in Indian River County, Florida, United States. The airport is publicly owned.

== History ==
Similar to other airfields established in Florida during World War II, the approximate 1,025-acre airport was built by the United States Navy in 1943 (known then as Roseland Satellite Field or Outlying Field Roseland) in support of naval flight training operations at nearby Naval Air Station Vero Beach and Naval Air Station Melbourne. The military paid approximately $1,300 for the property in 1943. Inactivated as a naval facility following the end of World War II, the aviation facility was transferred by the War Assets Administration, as part of the Surplus Property Act of 1944, on January 29, 1959, to the City of Sebastian. Upon taking responsibility, a provision was written in reference to the Federal Surplus Property Act, that the airport would be used without unfair discrimination solely for aviation purposes. This provision provided that the property be given back to the United States in the event of noncompliance with any terms and conditions of the deed.

== Operations ==
Since its acquisition in 1959, Sebastian Municipal Airport (now 620 acres) has been maintained and operated by the City of Sebastian. Since the transfer of ownership from the U.S. Government, Sebastian Municipal Airport has undergone numerous facility changes and improvements. The noted championship Sebastian Municipal Golf Course was built in 1981 on a 155-acre plot of land occupying a large portion of the airport property and local area flight training greatly increased operations at the airport in the mid- to late 1980s.

Currently, a fixed-base operator (FBO) occupies the west side of the airfield, and frequent skydiving activity accounts for a large portion of operations at the airport. The addition of a number of commercial and private general aviation hangars and related aprons were developed along the west quadrant of the field. No identifiable existing structures remain from the airport's days as a naval installation.

Founded in 1994, Skydive Sebastian currently operates a Cessna Caravan and a Twin Otter loaned from Skydive Chicago. It conducts tandem and accelerated freefall training. Facilities include two hangars for manifest and packing, a campground, and a bar/restaurant. The airport was home to the 2018 USPA National Parachuting Championship.

== See also ==
- List of airports in Florida
