= National Register of Historic Places listings in Indian River County, Florida =

Location of Indian River County in Florida

This is a list of the National Register of Historic Places listings in Indian River County, Florida. It is a list of properties and districts on the National Register of Historic Places in Indian River County, Florida, United States. The locations of National Register properties and districts for which the latitude and longitude coordinates are included below, may be seen in a map.

There are 32 properties and districts listed on the National Register in the county, including 1 National Historic Landmark.

This National Park Service list is complete through NPS recent listings posted May 1, 2026.

Contents: Counties in Florida (non-linked contain no National Register listings)
Alachua - Baker - Bay - Bradford - Brevard - Broward - Calhoun - Charlotte - Citrus - Clay - Collier - Columbia - DeSoto - Dixie - Duval - Escambia - Flagler - Franklin - Gadsden - Gilchrist - Glades - Gulf - Hamilton - Hardee - Hendry - Hernando - Highlands - Hillsborough (Tampa) - Holmes - Indian River - Jackson - Jefferson - Lafayette - Lake - Lee - Leon - Levy - Liberty - Madison - Manatee - Marion - Martin - Miami-Dade (Miami) - Monroe - Nassau - Okaloosa - Okeechobee - Orange - Osceola - Palm Beach - Pasco - Pinellas - Polk - Putnam - St. Johns - St. Lucie - Santa Rosa - Sarasota - Seminole - Sumter - Suwannee - Taylor - Union - Volusia - Wakulla - Walton - Washington

== Current listings ==
	Name on the Register	Image	Date listed	Location	City or town	Description
1	Driftwood Inn and Restaurant	Driftwood Inn and Restaurant	August 6, 1994 (#94000751)	3150 Ocean Drive; 27°39′03″N 80°21′19″W	Vero Beach	
2	Marian Fell Library	Marian Fell Library	October 8, 1996 (#96001059)	63 North Cypress Street; 27°46′15″N 80°36′13″W	Fellsmere	Part of the Fellsmere MPS
3	Fellsmere Historic District	Fellsmere Historic District	September 17, 2021 (#100006378)	North Myrtle St, South Carolina Ave, North Oak St., and Virginia Ave; 27°46′05″N 80°36′05″W	Fellsmere	
4	Fellsmere Public School	Fellsmere Public School	November 22, 1996 (#96001368)	22 South Orange Street; 27°46′00″N 80°36′11″W	Fellsmere	Part of the Fellsmere MPS
5	First Methodist Episcopal Church	First Methodist Episcopal Church	December 27, 1996 (#96001521)	39 North Broadway; 27°46′08″N 80°36′04″W	Fellsmere	Part of the Fellsmere MPS
6	Judge Henry F. Gregory House	Judge Henry F. Gregory House	June 3, 1994 (#94000540)	2179 10th Avenue; 27°38′26″N 80°23′37″W	Vero Beach	
7	Hallstrom House	Hallstrom House	June 6, 2002 (#02000605)	1723 Southwest Old Dixie Highway; 27°34′16″N 80°22′31″W	Vero Beach	
8	Theodore Hausmann Estate	Theodore Hausmann Estate	March 14, 1997 (#97000230)	4800 16th Street; 27°37′53″N 80°26′11″W	Vero Beach	
9	Frank and Stella Heiser House	Frank and Stella Heiser House	November 29, 2017 (#100001862)	11055 138th Ave. 27°47′47″N 80°36′28″W	Fellsmere vicinity	
10	Indian River County Courthouse	Indian River County Courthouse	July 19, 1999 (#99000768)	2145 14th Avenue; 27°38′23″N 80°23′59″W	Vero Beach	
11	Jungle Trail	Jungle Trail	August 1, 2003 (#03000700)	Between Old Winter Bch Rd. and State Road A1A on Orchid Island; 27°44′09″N 80°24′24″W	Orchid	
12	Bamma Vickers Lawson House	Bamma Vickers Lawson House	July 26, 1990 (#90001116)	1133 U.S. Route 1; 27°48′48″N 80°28′05″W	Sebastian	
13	Maher Building	Maher Building	October 28, 1994 (#94001274)	1423 20th Street; 27°38′18″N 80°24′01″W	Vero Beach	
14	McKee Jungle Gardens	McKee Jungle Gardens	January 7, 1998 (#97001636)	350 U.S. Route 1; 27°36′29″N 80°23′00″W	Vero Beach	
15	Old Palmetto Hotel	Old Palmetto Hotel	November 13, 1991 (#91001650)	1889 Old Dixie Highway; 27°38′08″N 80°23′55″W	Vero Beach	
16	Old Town Sebastian Historic District, East	Old Town Sebastian Historic District, East	August 4, 2003 (#03000728)	Main and Washington Streets, Riverside Drive, and the Florida East Coast railroad line 27°48′58″N 80°28′09″W	Sebastian	
17	Old Town Sebastian Historic District, West	Old Town Sebastian Historic District, West	January 6, 2004 (#03001364)	Bounded by Palmetto Avenue and Lake and Main Streets; 27°48′59″N 80°28′23″W	Sebastian	
18	Old Vero Beach Community Building	Old Vero Beach Community Building	January 19, 1993 (#92001746)	2146 14th Avenue; 27°38′24″N 80°23′57″W	Vero Beach	
19	Osceola Park Historic Residential District	Osceola Park Historic Residential District	January 13, 2013 (#12001196)	Bounded by 20th & 18th Sts., 20th & 23rd Aves. 27°38′11″N 80°24′27″W	Vero Beach	
20	Pelican Island National Wildlife Refuge	Pelican Island National Wildlife Refuge	October 15, 1966 (#66000265)	East of Sebastian in the Indian River; 27°48′00″N 80°26′00″W	Sebastian	
21	Pueblo Arcade	Pueblo Arcade	March 8, 1997 (#97000211)	2044 14th Street; 27°38′23″N 80°24′00″W	Vero Beach	
22	Riverside		February 2, 2024 (#100008971)	13425 North Indian River Dr. 27°50′18″N 80°28′47″W	Sebastian	
23	Royal Park Arcade	Royal Park Arcade	July 31, 1998 (#98000925)	1059 21st Street; 27°38′21″N 80°23′41″W	Vero Beach	
24	Ryburn Apartments	Ryburn Apartments	October 23, 2023 (#100009460)	1110 Royal Palm Blvd. 27°38′32″N 80°23′46″W	Vero Beach	
25	Sebastian Grammar and Junior High School	Sebastian Grammar and Junior High School	August 17, 2001 (#01000889)	1235 Main St. 27°49′03″N 80°28′32″W	Sebastian	Now a museum inside the Sebastian City Hall complex.
26	Archie Smith Wholesale Fish Company	Archie Smith Wholesale Fish Company	October 28, 1994 (#94001275)	1740 Indian River Drive; 27°49′46″N 80°28′29″W	Sebastian	
27	Spanish Fleet Survivors and Salvors Camp Site	Spanish Fleet Survivors and Salvors Camp Site	August 12, 1970 (#70000186)	Address Restricted	Sebastian	
28	Treasure Hammock Ranch Farmstead	Treasure Hammock Ranch Farmstead	December 11, 2013 (#13000900)	8005 37th Street; 27°39′37″N 80°29′32″W	Vero Beach vicinity	
29	Vero Beach Diesel Power Plant	Vero Beach Diesel Power Plant	February 26, 1999 (#99000252)	1246 19th Street; 27°38′13″N 80°23′50″W	Vero Beach	
30	Vero Beach Woman's Club	Vero Beach Woman's Club	February 10, 1995 (#95000051)	1534 21st Street; 27°38′23″N 80°24′00″W	Vero Beach	
31	Vero Railroad Station	Vero Railroad Station	January 6, 1987 (#86003560)	2336 Fourteenth Street; 27°38′34″N 80°23′57″W	Vero Beach	
32	Vero Theatre	Vero Theatre	April 28, 1992 (#92000421)	2036 14th Avenue; 27°38′20″N 80°23′57″W	Vero Beach	

== See also ==
- List of National Historic Landmarks in Florida
- National Register of Historic Places listings in Florida
