= Treasure Hammock Ranch Farmstead =

- U.S. National Register of Historic Places
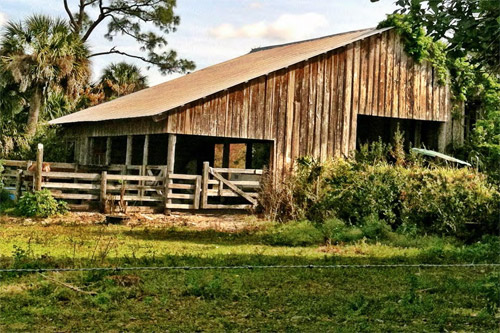

- Location within Florida Location within the United States
- Location: Vero Beach, Florida
- Coordinates: 27°39′37″N 80°29′32″W
- NRHP reference No.: 13000900
- Added to NRHP: December 11, 2013

Treasure Hammock Ranch Farmstead is a national historic site located at 8005 37th Street, Vero Beach, Florida in Indian River County. The farmstead is part of the Treasure Hammock Ranch, used for cattle farming since 1943 when Sexton family bought the original 400 acres.

It was added to the National Register of Historic Places on December 11, 2013.
