= Theodore Hausmann Estate =

Historic house in Florida, United States

- U.S. National Register of Historic Places
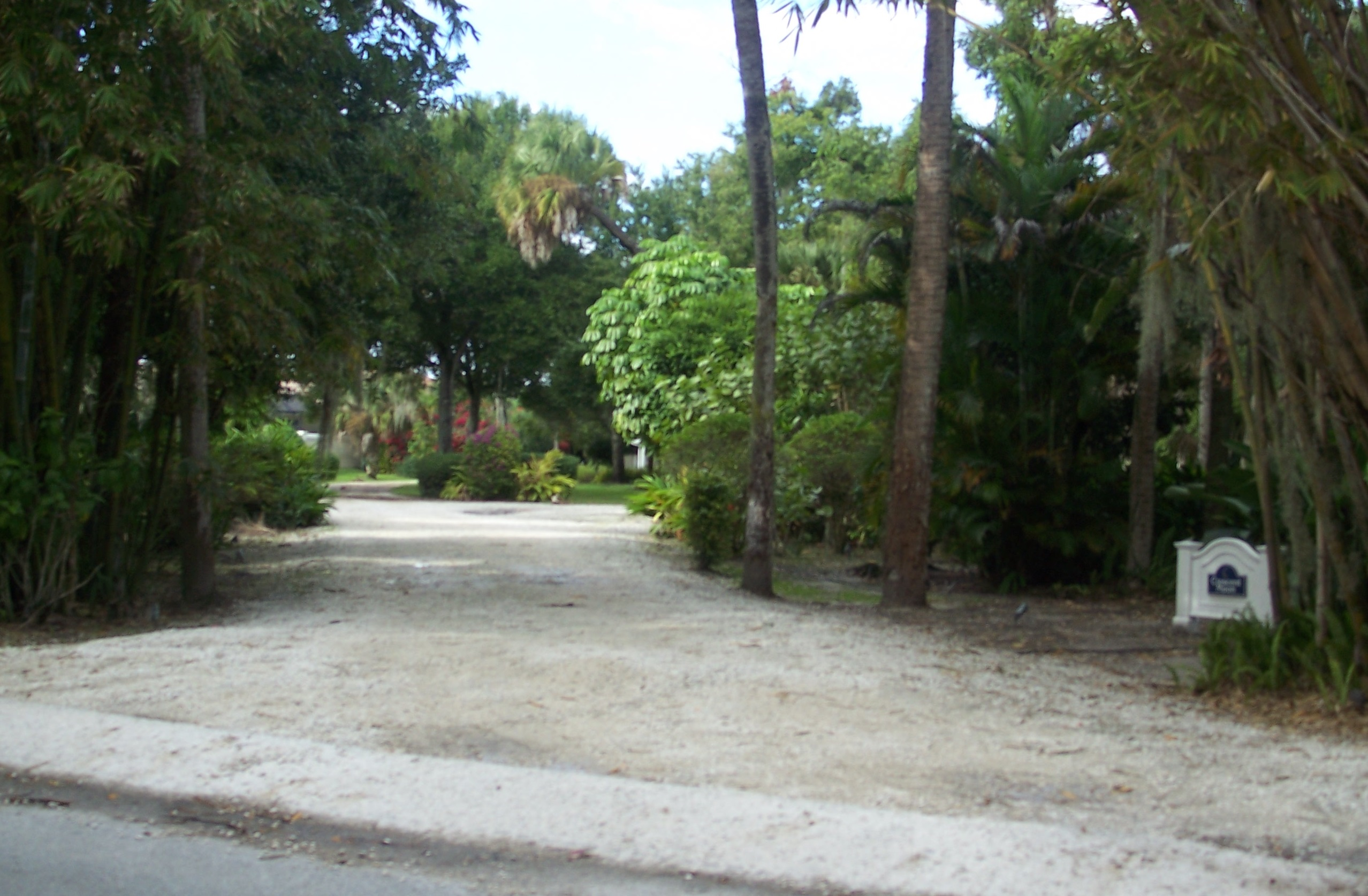

- Location within Florida Location within the United States
- Location: 4800 16th Street; Vero Beach, Florida 32960
- Coordinates: 27°37′57″N 80°25′32″W
- Built: 1922
- Architectural style: Frame Vernacular
- NRHP reference No.: 97000230
- Added to NRHP: March 14, 1997

The Theodore Hausmann Estate is a historic site in Vero Beach, Florida. It is located at 4800 16th Street. On March 14, 1997, it was added to the U.S. National Register of Historic Places.
