= Maher Building =

- U.S. National Register of Historic Places
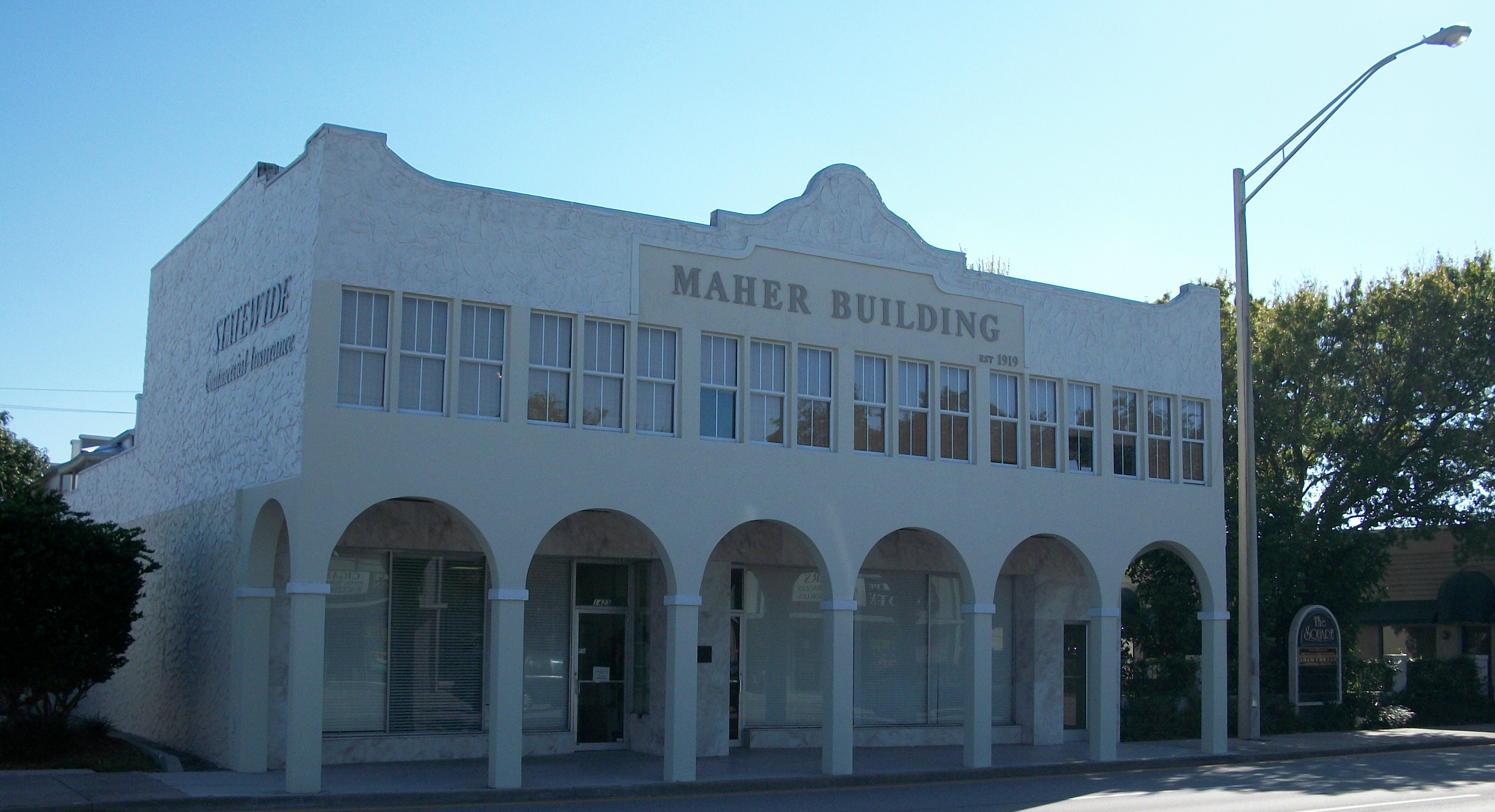

- Location within Florida Location within the United States
- Location: 1423 20th Street; Vero Beach, Florida 32960
- Coordinates: 27°38′18″N 80°24′1″W
- Built: 1920
- NRHP reference No.: 94001274
- Added to NRHP: October 28, 1994

The Maher Building is a historic building in Vero Beach, Florida. Originally located at 1423 Osceola Boulevard, now 20th Street, the Maher Building housed the Maher department store owned by William J. and Catherine Maher. The store retained a reasonable reputation throughout the city for offering apparel at "pleasing prices". Although there were no deaths when the original store building burned down in November 1919, the tragedy resulted in its complete loss. After Maher recovered from the damages, he reordered stock from St. Louis and commissioned a new brick and concrete structure on the building's original site. On October 28, 1994, this structure was added to the U.S. National Register of Historic Places.

In 1989, it was listed in A Guide to Florida's Historic Architecture erroneously as Illinois Hotel, published by the University of Florida Press. The Illinois Hotel was just to the east of the Maher Building and operated by Elsie Toole but it was later demolished in 1967.
