= Judge Henry F. Gregory House =

Historic house in Florida, United States

- U.S. National Register of Historic Places
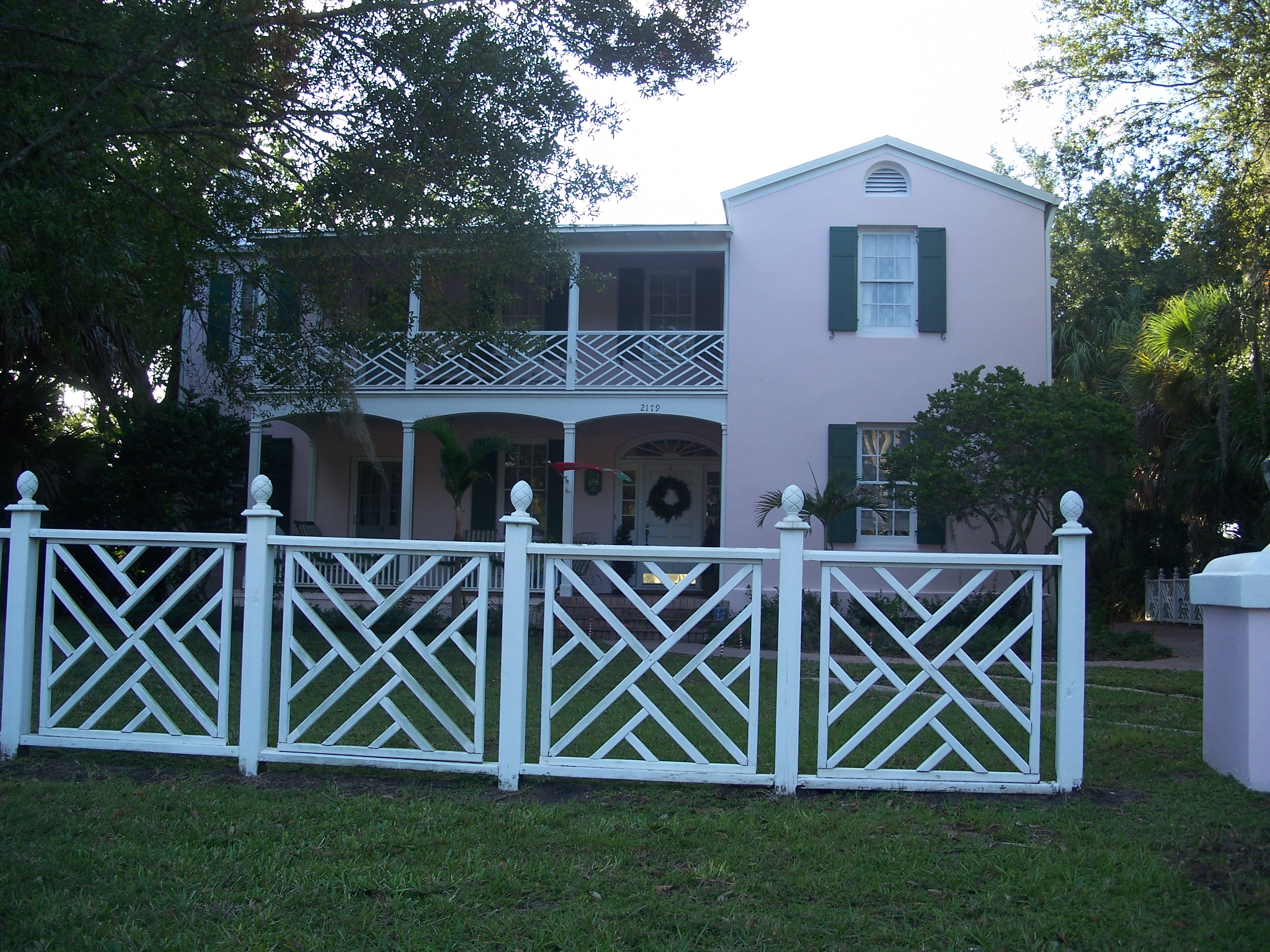

- Location within Florida Location within the United States
- Location: 2179 10th Avenue; Vero Beach, Florida 32960
- Coordinates: 27°38′26″N 80°23′37″W
- Built: 1937
- Architect: Bruce Kitchell
- Architectural style: Monterey Colonial
- NRHP reference No.: 94000540
- Added to NRHP: June 3, 1994

The Judge Henry F. Gregory House is a historic home in Vero Beach, Florida, United States. It is located at 2179 10th Avenue. On June 3, 1994, it was added to the U.S. National Register of Historic Places. Bruce Kitchell was the architect, and the home was built in the Monterey Colonial style.
