= Vero Beach, Florida =

- City
- City of Vero Beach
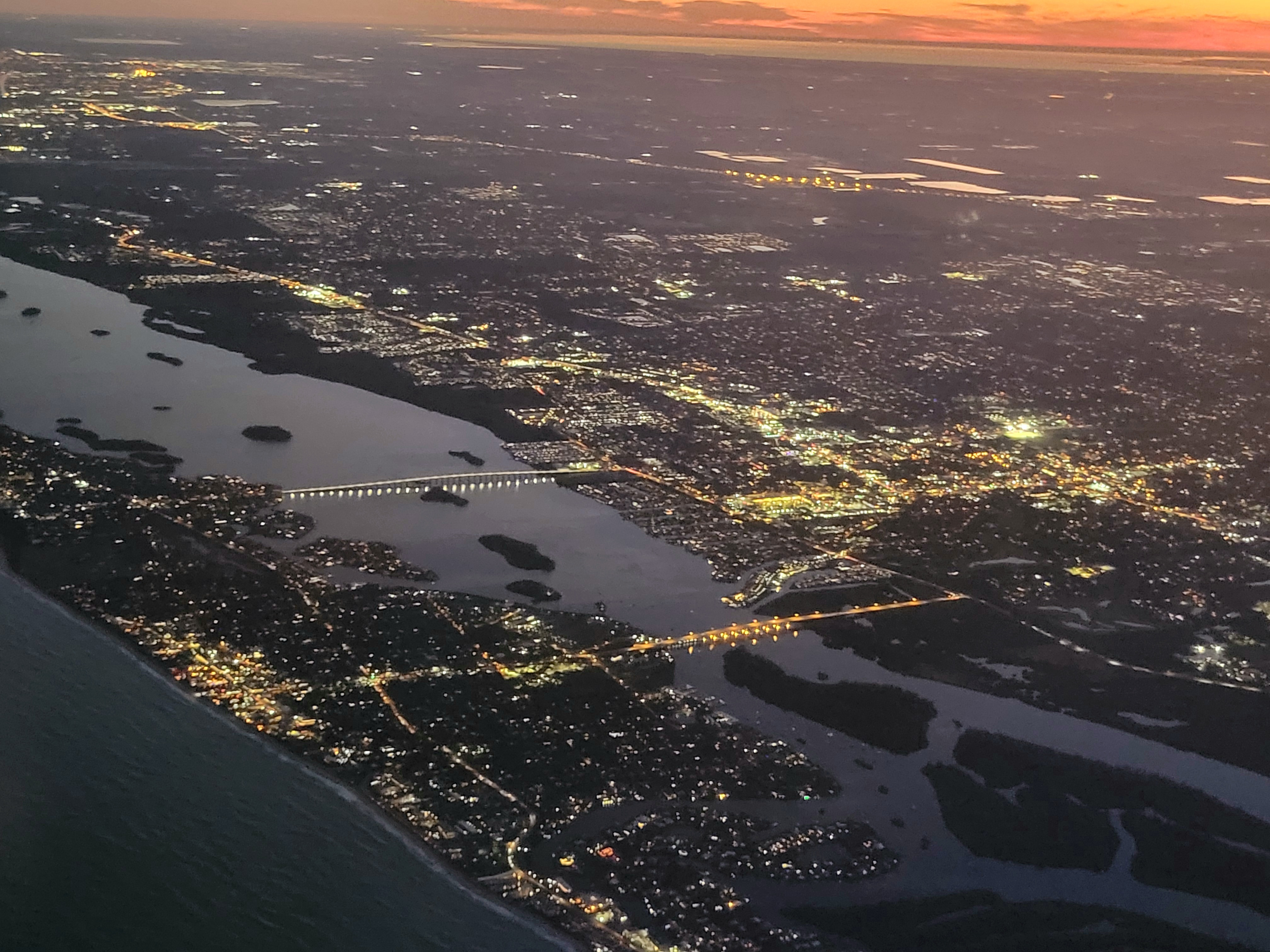
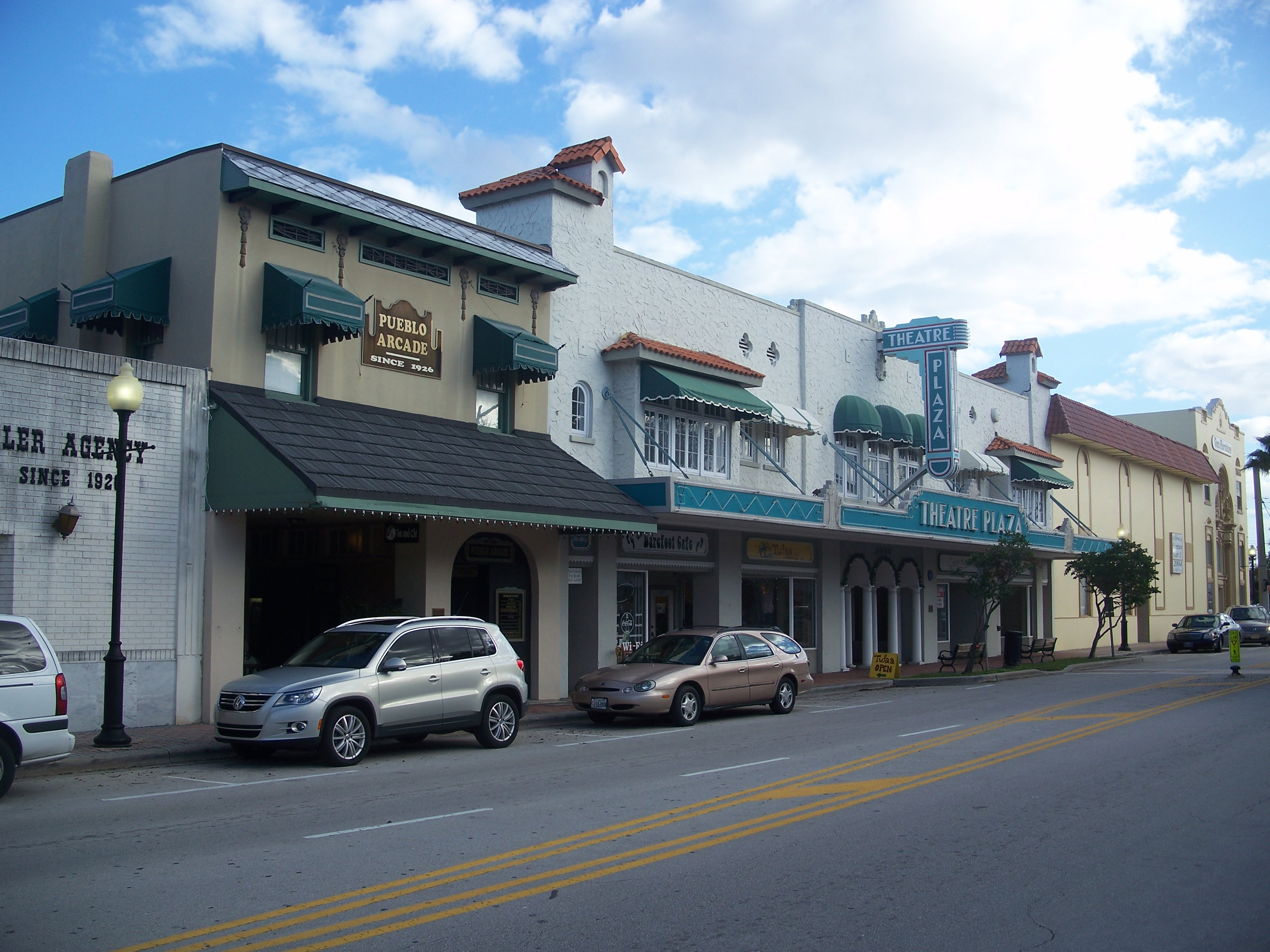
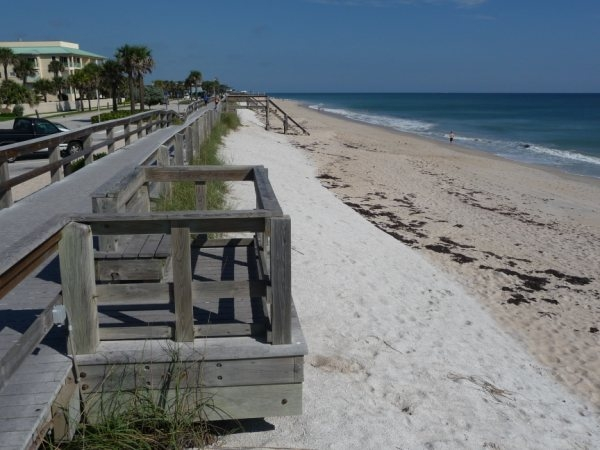
- Aerial view of the Vero Beach coastline at night Downtown Vero in 2010 Vero Beach boardwalk

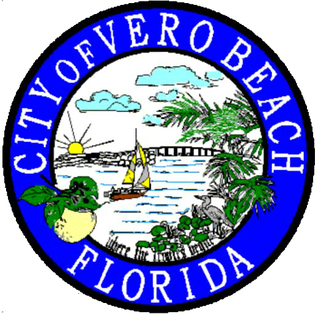
- Seal
- Nickname: The Hibiscus City
- Motto(s): The Gateway to the Tropics; Where the Tropics Begin
- Location in Indian River County and the state of Florida
- Coordinates: 27°37′50″N 80°22′43″W
- Country: United States
- State: Florida
- County: Indian River
- Settled: 1870
- via Plat: 1913-1914
- Incorporated (Vero): June 10, 1919
- Incorporated (Vero Beach): May 19, 1925

Government
  - Type: Council-Manager
  - Mayor: John E. Cotugno
  - City Manager: Monte K. Falls
  - City Council: List: • John E. Cotugno; • Linda Moore; • Tracey Zudans; • John Carroll; • Taylor Dingle

Area
  - City: 13.41 sq mi (34.72 km^{2})
  - Land: 11.50 sq mi (29.78 km^{2})
  - Water: 1.90 sq mi (4.93 km^{2}) 14.31%
- Elevation: 10 ft (3.0 m)

Population (2020)
  - City: 16,354
  - Density: 1,422/sq mi (549.1/km^{2})
  - Metro: 159,788
- Time zone: UTC-5 (Eastern (EST))
  - Summer (DST): UTC-4 (EDT)
- ZIP codes: 32960-32969
- Area code: 772
- FIPS code: 12-74150
- GNIS feature ID: 2405643
- Website: http://www.covb.org

Vero Beach is a city in and the county seat of Indian River County, Florida, United States. According to the 2020 census, the city had a population of 16,354. Nicknamed "The Hibiscus City", Vero is situated about 85 miles (137 km) southeast of Orlando along the Indian River Lagoon and the Atlantic Ocean on Florida's Treasure Coast. Because it is located about 65 miles (105 km) north of West Palm Beach at the northern end of the South Florida region, the city has adopted two similar mottos "The Gateway to the Tropics" and "Where the Tropics Begin".

Vero Beach was named the 7th Best Small Beach Town in Florida by Southern Living Magazine in 2023. The main roadways in the city are U.S. Route 1, Florida State Road A1A, and Florida State Road 60 (20th Street), which has its eastern terminus at Sexton Plaza in the city.

== History ==
=== Pre-Columbian ===
Parts of a human skeleton were found north of Vero in association with the remains of Pleistocene animals in 1915. The find was controversial, and the view that the human remains dated from much later than the Pleistocene prevailed for many years. In 2006, an image of a mastodon or mammoth carved on a bone was found in vicinity of the Vero man discovery. A scientific forensic examination of the bone found the carving had probably been done in the Pleistocene. Archaeologists from Mercyhurst University, in conjunction with the Old Vero Ice Age Sites Committee (OVIASC), conducted excavations at the Old Vero Man site in Vero Beach in 2014–2015. Starting in 2016, archaeologists from Florida Atlantic University joined the Old Vero Man site excavations.

=== Post-Columbian ===
In 1715, a Spanish treasure fleet wrecked off the coast of Vero. Eleven out of twelve Spanish ships carrying tonnes of silver foundered in a hurricane. The remains of the silver attracted pirates. A group of 300 unemployed English privateers led by Henry Jennings stole about £87,500 in gold and silver in their first acts of piracy. The coins still wash to the shore to this day.

In 1872, Captain Allen W. Estes officially established the first land patent between the Atlantic Ocean and the Indian River Lagoon, after settling in the area in 1870.

In 1893, Henry Flagler's Florida East Coast Railway began operation through the area.

The town of Vero was chartered on June 10, 1919, with a population of 71 residents.

Vero was switched from being part of St. Lucie County to being designated the county seat of the newly-formed Indian River County on May 19, 1925 and was officially renamed "Vero Beach".

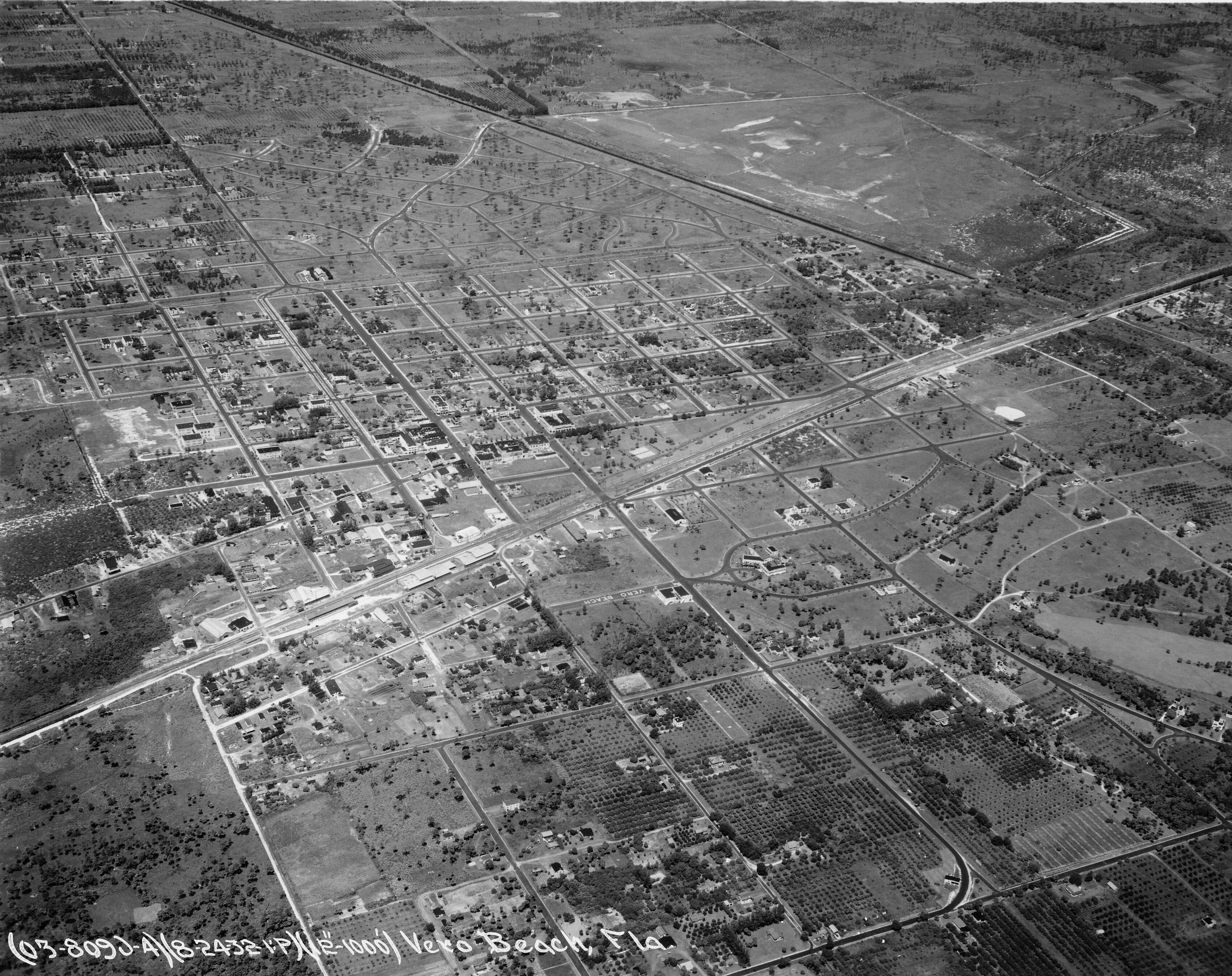
Vero Beach, 1932

There are many theories on possible origin of the city name, but there's no consensus. Early residential construction in the area often utilized Florida cracker architecture style.

During the war year of 1942, the U.S. Navy selected 1,500 acres (6.1 km^{2}) surrounding the Vero Beach Municipal Airport as the site of Fort Pierce Naval Amphibious Training Base, a Naval Air Station. Due to the bombing practices conducted during the WWII, there are many buried explosives and the Army Corps officials have conducted ongoing search & clearing exercises for the potentially dangerous items since 2014.

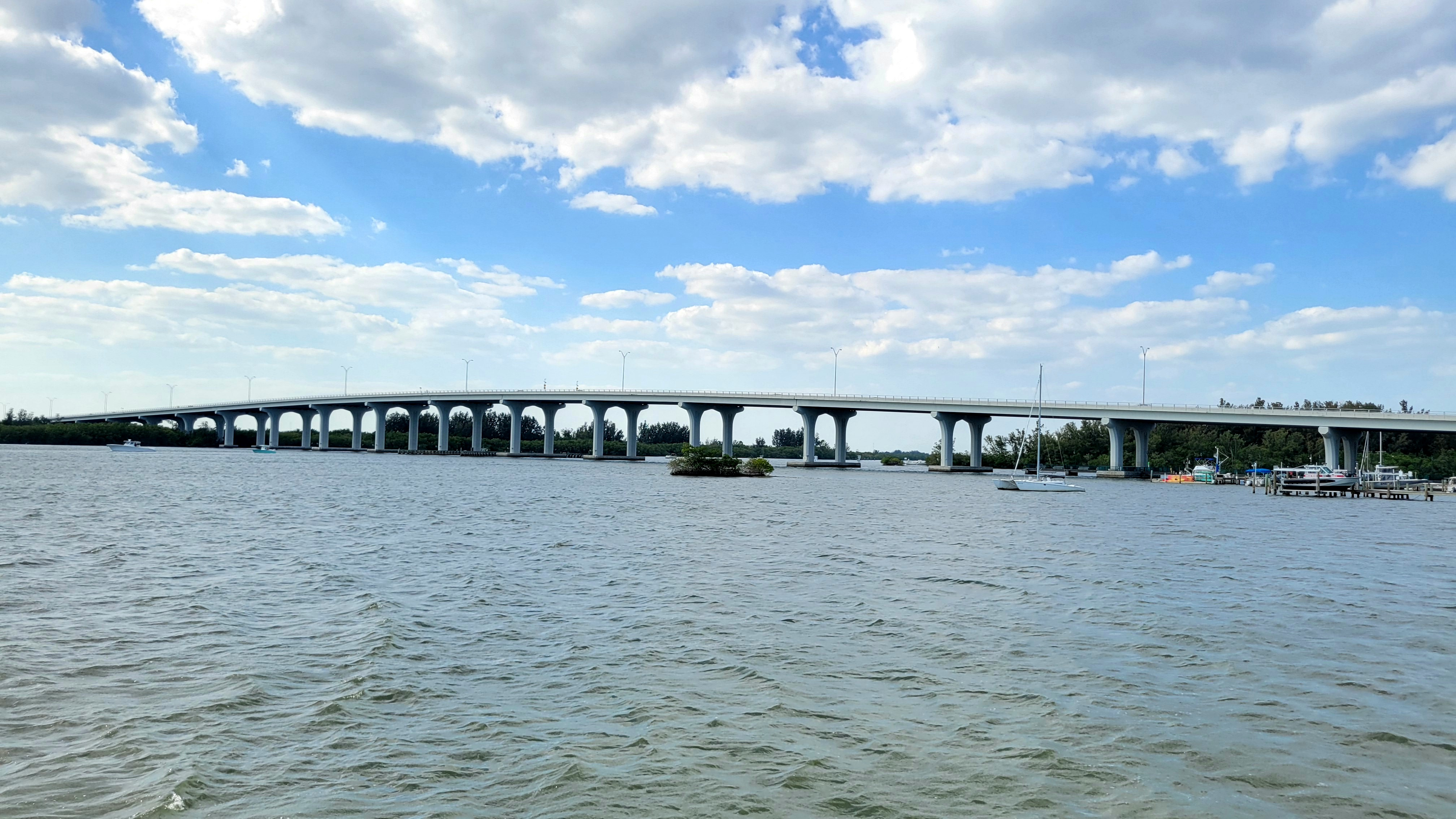
Merrill P. Barber Bridge in 2023

In 1951, Barber Bridge was built from mainland to barrier islands. It was later demolished and replaced in 1995 with the Merrill P. Barber Bridge. It is named after Merrill P. Barber who was the mayor of Vero beach in 1947.

In 1957, Piper Aircraft began research and development in Vero Beach. In 1961 Piper Aircraft moved administrative and manufacturing operations to Vero after completing building additions.

In 1965, the A1A bridge over the Sebastian Inlet connected the two barrier islands. In 1979, the 17th Street Bridge was completed, allowing a second point of access from Vero Beach mainland to the barrier islands.

== Geography ==
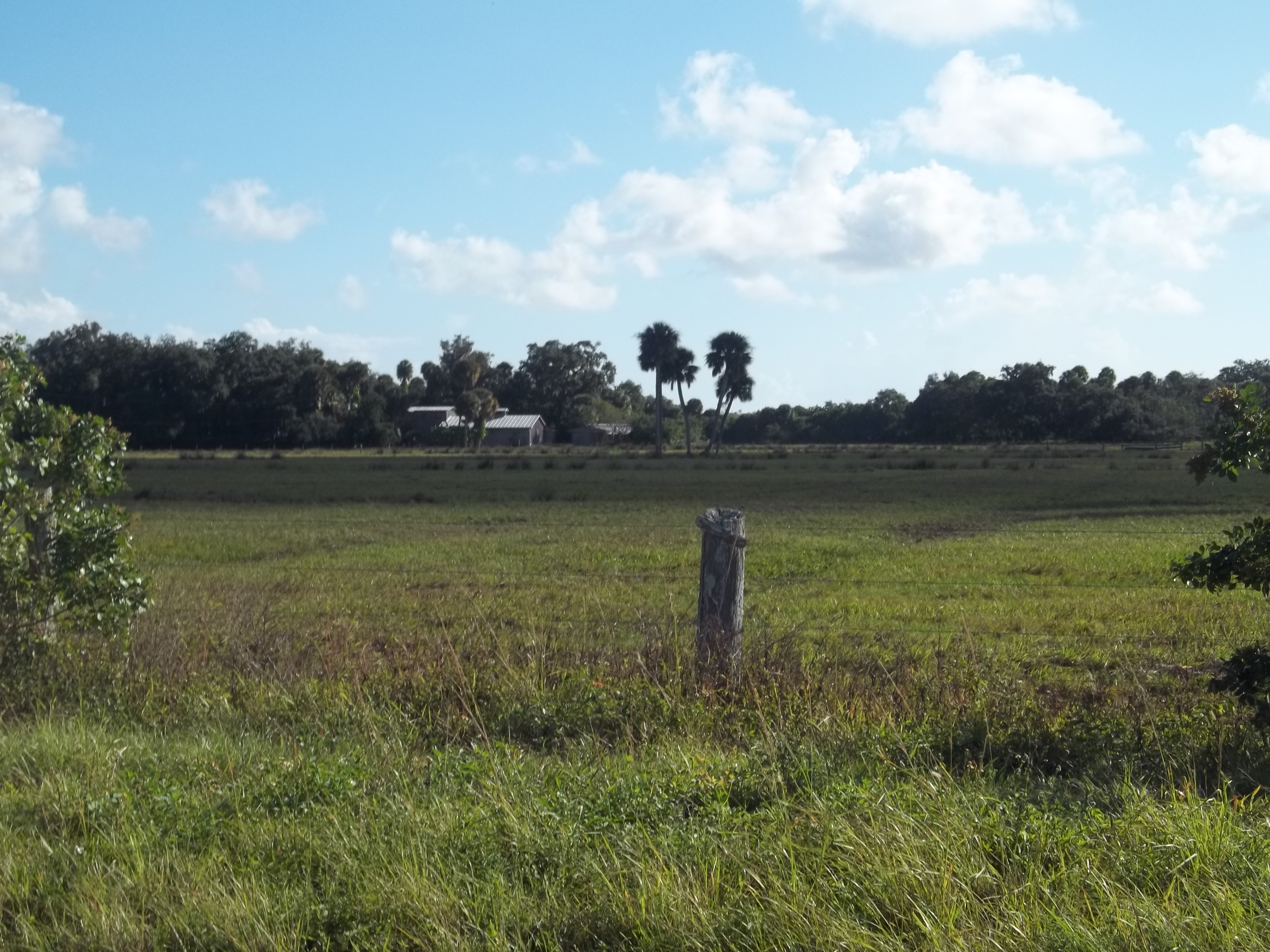
Vero Beach FL Treasure Hammock Ranch Farmstead02

Like much of Florida, Vero Beach is mostly flat, stretching from the beach and running inland. The average elevation of the city is 23 feet above sea level.

The exact coordinates for the city of Vero Beach are 27°39′N 80°23′W

=== Climate ===
Under the Köppen climate classification, Vero Beach has a humid subtropical climate, bordering very closely on a tropical monsoon climate, with hot and humid summers and warm, drier winters. Nevertheless, the city experiences a significant amount of rainfall, even during the month with historically low precipitation levels. Vero Beach experiences tropical storms and hurricanes, and its hurricane season runs from June 1 to November 30.

Climate data for Vero Beach, Florida (Vero Beach Regional Airport), 1991–2020 normals, extremes 1942–present
Month	Jan	Feb	Mar	Apr	May	Jun	Jul	Aug	Sep	Oct	Nov	Dec	Year
Record high °F (°C)	88 (31)	90 (32)	93 (34)	97 (36)	99 (37)	102 (39)	99 (37)	98 (37)	97 (36)	94 (34)	92 (33)	89 (32)	102 (39)
Mean maximum °F (°C)	84.2 (29.0)	86.0 (30.0)	88.8 (31.6)	90.7 (32.6)	93.3 (34.1)	95.1 (35.1)	95.3 (35.2)	95.0 (35.0)	92.9 (33.8)	90.8 (32.7)	86.7 (30.4)	84.4 (29.1)	96.6 (35.9)
Mean daily maximum °F (°C)	73.3 (22.9)	75.6 (24.2)	78.4 (25.8)	81.9 (27.7)	85.7 (29.8)	88.9 (31.6)	90.5 (32.5)	90.6 (32.6)	88.4 (31.3)	84.8 (29.3)	79.3 (26.3)	75.4 (24.1)	82.7 (28.2)
Daily mean °F (°C)	62.8 (17.1)	65.0 (18.3)	68.0 (20.0)	72.1 (22.3)	76.7 (24.8)	80.6 (27.0)	81.9 (27.7)	82.1 (27.8)	80.9 (27.2)	76.9 (24.9)	70.4 (21.3)	65.7 (18.7)	73.6 (23.1)
Mean daily minimum °F (°C)	52.2 (11.2)	54.5 (12.5)	57.7 (14.3)	62.4 (16.9)	67.8 (19.9)	72.2 (22.3)	73.3 (22.9)	73.6 (23.1)	73.4 (23.0)	69.0 (20.6)	61.4 (16.3)	56.1 (13.4)	64.5 (18.1)
Mean minimum °F (°C)	34.7 (1.5)	37.8 (3.2)	41.7 (5.4)	48.0 (8.9)	57.4 (14.1)	66.9 (19.4)	69.6 (20.9)	69.9 (21.1)	68.2 (20.1)	54.9 (12.7)	45.7 (7.6)	39.3 (4.1)	32.8 (0.4)
Record low °F (°C)	21 (−6)	26 (−3)	26 (−3)	36 (2)	46 (8)	57 (14)	62 (17)	63 (17)	61 (16)	45 (7)	31 (−1)	23 (−5)	21 (−6)
Average precipitation inches (mm)	2.74 (70)	2.20 (56)	3.44 (87)	3.06 (78)	4.20 (107)	6.76 (172)	5.68 (144)	7.35 (187)	7.04 (179)	5.33 (135)	2.91 (74)	2.54 (65)	53.25 (1,353)
Average precipitation days (≥ 0.01 in)	8.1	7.0	7.5	6.7	8.8	13.9	13.0	15.0	15.8	11.9	9.0	8.7	125.4
Source: NOAA all-time Feb record

== Economy ==
=== Industry ===
Vero Beach is home to general aviation manufacturer Piper Aircraft, which is the largest private employer in Indian River County. As of July 2015, Piper employed approximately 750 people. Aside from Piper, the bulk of commercial activity in Vero Beach centers around tourism, the citrus industry, and service activities. Vero Beach's citrus industry has been negatively affected in recent years by citrus greening disease.

=== Retail ===
There are two shopping malls: the Indian River Mall, and the Vero Beach Outlets just west of I-95 on State Road 60. There are small specialty shops along Ocean Drive on the barrier island. There are also a set of shops directly inland in what is called "Miracle Mile". The Historic Downtown is a newly revitalized area of shopping, dining, antique stores, and art galleries.

=== Tourism ===
==== Beaches ====
The beaches in Vero Beach are part of Florida's Treasure Coast. Vero's three main public beaches are South Beach, accessible at the eastern end of Florida State Road 656 at the eastern end of 17th Street; Humiston Park, in Vero's Central Beach Business District on Ocean Drive and Jaycee Park which is adjacent to Conn Beach. There are 26 miles (42 km) of oceanfront shore in Indian River County. Vero Beach also has other free public access trails and walkways with beach access, such as Riomar Beach, Sea Cove, Sea Grape Trail, Sexton Plaza, and Turtle Trail.

==== Parks ====
There are several public parks in Vero Beach, including Humiston Beach Park, Riverside Park, Jaycee Beach Park, Veterans' Island Memorial Sanctuary, and Pocahontas Park.

==== Water recreation in the Indian River Lagoon ====
The Indian River Lagoon, passing through Vero Beach, forms a significant portion of the Intracoastal Waterway, and is a hub for boating, fishing, water skiing, diving, kayaking, and other small-craft waterborne activities.

==== Resorts ====
Disney's Vero Beach Resort is officially located in Wabasso Beach, a small town north of Vero Beach. Costa d'Este Beach Resort & Spa, owned by Gloria and Emilio Estefan, is located on Ocean Drive. As of 2021, the city hosts 14 private golf clubs.

==== Historic Dodgertown ====
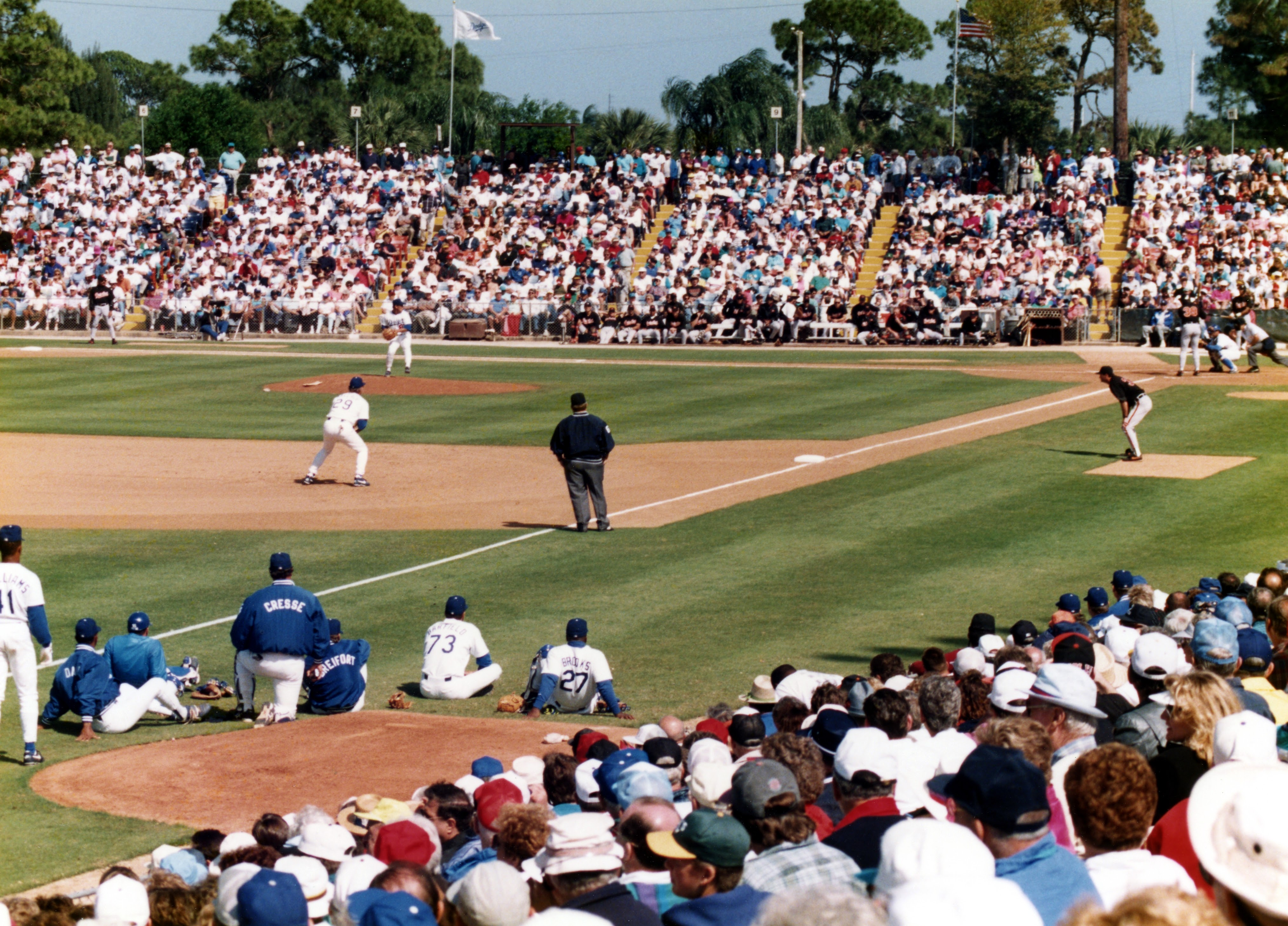
Vero Beach had been the spring training home of the Los Angeles Dodgers since 1948. The Dodgers left Vero Beach in 2008 for Glendale, AZ.

Vero Beach is home to Historic Dodgertown, which initially started operations during World War II as a U.S. Naval Air Station, and later served as the spring training facility of the Brooklyn Dodgers and successor Los Angeles Dodgers baseball teams, until 2008. After the team's departure for a new Spring home in Arizona in 2008, it has served as a year-round multi-purpose facility for athletes of all ages. As of January 2, 2019, MLB has assumed control of the historic facilities with plans to expand the complex and rename it The Jackie Robinson Training Complex. This is to honor both the late Jackie Robinson and the site's history as the first racially integrated spring training center in the American South.

==== National Register of Historic Places ====
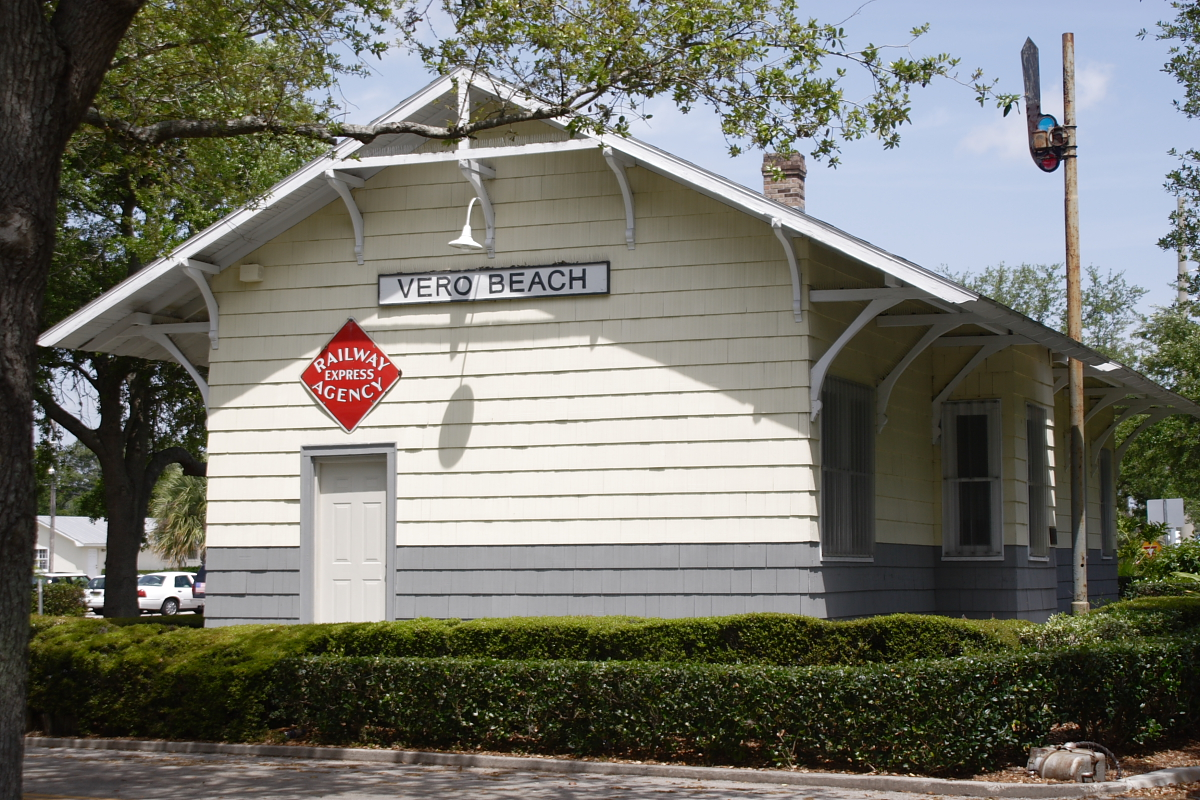
Vero Railroad Station

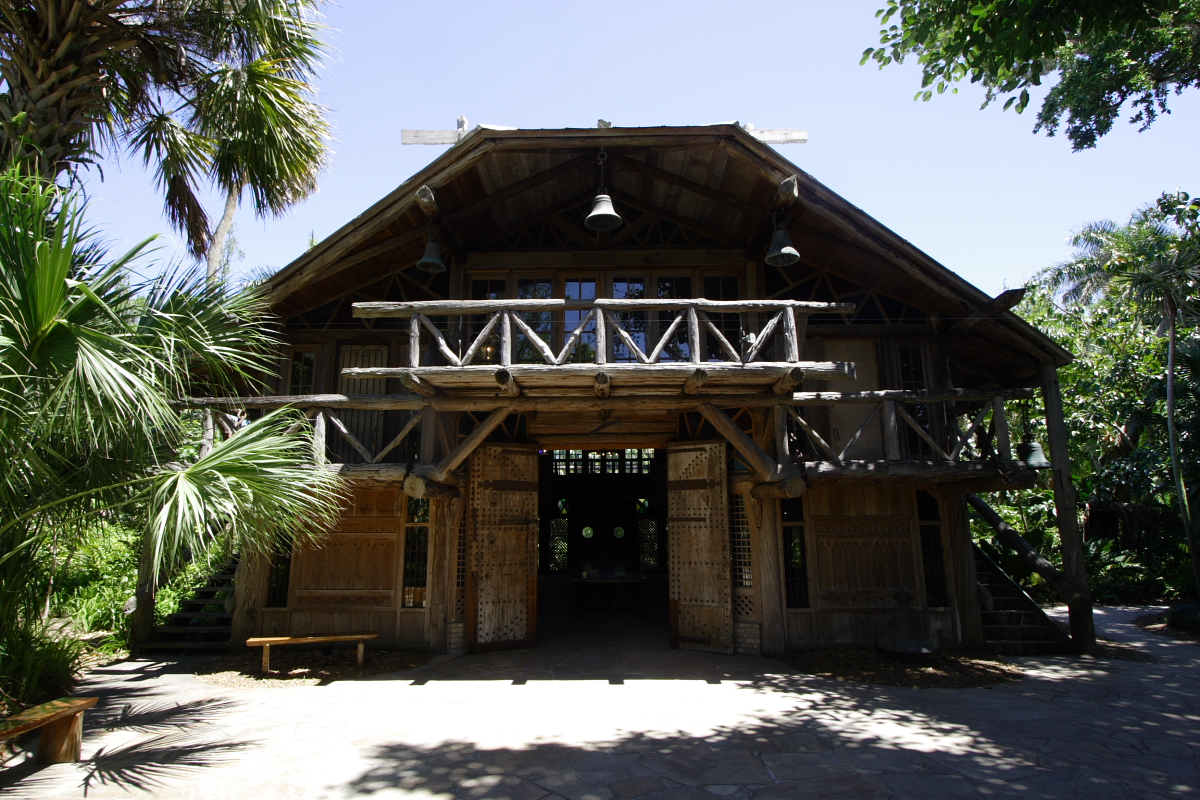
McKee Jungle Gardens

- Driftwood Inn
- Hallstrom House
- Old Indian River County Courthouse
- Judge Henry F. Gregory House
- Maher Building
- McKee Jungle Gardens
- Old Palmetto Hotel
- Pueblo Arcade
- Royal Park Arcade
- Theodore Hausmann Estate
- Old Vero Beach Community Building
- Vero Beach Diesel Power Plant
- Vero Beach Woman's Club
- Vero Railroad Station
- Vero Theatre
- Osceola Park Historic Residential District
- Ryburn Apartments
- Treasure Hammock Ranch Farmstead

== Demographics ==
Historical population
Census	Pop.	Note	%±
1920	793		—
1930	2,268		186.0%
1940	3,050		34.5%
1950	4,746		55.6%
1960	8,849		86.5%
1970	11,908		34.6%
1980	16,176		35.8%
1990	17,350		7.3%
2000	17,705		2.0%
2010	15,220		−14.0%
2020	16,354		7.5%
U.S. Decennial Census

=== Racial and ethnic composition ===
Vero Beach city, Florida – Racial and ethnic composition Note: the US Census treats Hispanic/Latino as an ethnic category. This table excludes Latinos from the racial categories and assigns them to a separate category. Hispanics/Latinos may be of any race.
Race / Ethnicity (NH = Non-Hispanic)	Pop 2000	Pop 2010	Pop 2020	% 2000	% 2010	% 2020
White alone (NH)	15,695	12,394	12,741	88.65%	81.43%	77.91%
Black or African American alone (NH)	581	676	681	3.28%	4.44%	4.16%
Native American or Alaska Native alone (NH)	34	26	32	0.19%	0.17%	0.20%
Asian alone (NH)	213	279	360	1.20%	1.83%	2.20%
Native Hawaiian or Pacific Islander alone (NH)	4	14	7	0.02%	0.09%	0.04%
Other race alone (NH)	20	17	88	0.11%	0.11%	0.54%
Mixed race or Multiracial (NH)	133	180	508	0.75%	1.18%	3.11%
Hispanic or Latino (any race)	1,025	1,634	1,937	5.79%	10.74%	11.84%
Total	17,705	15,220	16,354	100.00%	100.00%	100.00%

=== 2020 census ===
As of the 2020 census, Vero Beach had a population of 16,354. The median age was 55.6 years. 13.2% of residents were under the age of 18 and 33.8% of residents were 65 years of age or older. For every 100 females, there were 93.9 males, and for every 100 females age 18 and over, there were 91.7 males age 18 and over.

100.0% of residents lived in urban areas, while 0.0% lived in rural areas.

There were 8,165 households in Vero Beach, of which 16.4% had children under the age of 18 living in them. Of all households, 39.2% were married-couple households, 22.2% were households with a male householder and no spouse or partner present, and 31.8% were households with a female householder and no spouse or partner present. About 39.9% of all households were made up of individuals, and 21.1% had someone living alone who was 65 years of age or older.

There were 10,287 housing units, of which 20.6% were vacant. The homeowner vacancy rate was 2.9% and the rental vacancy rate was 11.6%.

=== 2020 income and poverty estimates ===
In 2020, females made up 53.0% of the population, and the average household size was 2.12. In 2020, the median income for a household in the city was $54,311, and the per capita income for the city was $52,524. Out of the total population, 12.8% were living below the poverty line.

=== 2024 estimate ===
As of July 2024, the U.S. Census Bureau estimated the population to be 17,556.

=== 2010 census ===
As of the 2010 United States census, there were 15,220 people residing in the city.

In 2010, there were 7,505 households, out of which 16.5% had children under the age of 18 living with them, 39.2% were married couples living together, 9.3% had a female householder with no husband present, and 47.4% were non-families. 19.6% had someone living alone who was 65 years of age or older, with 4.8% being 85 years and older. The average household size was 2.01 and the average family size was 2.65.

In 2010, in the city the population was spread out, with 14.1% under the age of 16, 84.1% over 18, 4.3% from 15 to 19, 4.9% from 20 to 24, 5.5% from 20 to 25 and 29.4% who were 65 years of age or older. The median age was 50.9 years.

In 2010, for every 100 females, there were 92.8 males. The population consisted of 51.3% female and 48.7% male.

== Infrastructure ==
=== Healthcare ===
Cleveland Clinic Indian River Hospital is the main hospital serving the Vero Beach region, formerly known as Indian River Medical Center. The hospital was acquired by the Cleveland Clinic Health System in 2019, which vowed to invest at least 250 million dollars over the next 10 years.

=== Transportation ===
==== Air ====
Vero Beach Regional Airport is a public airport one mile northwest of Vero Beach, offering commercial jet service by Breeze Airways since February 2023. Additional commercial service was added by JetBlue in December 2025 and by American Airlines in February 2026.

==== Bus ====
Vero Beach is served by GoLine Bus routes. The permanent location for the main transit hub for GoLine is located in Vero Beach.

==== Rail ====
The Florida East Coast Railway (FEC) mainline bisects Vero Beach, with an active team track in town serving two off-line lumber/building products customers, who receive boxcars, flatcars and gondolas. The Vero Railroad Station served the transportation needs of the community and its surrounding agricultural area for almost 65 years from 1903 to 1968. It now serves as a county historical exhibit center. As of September 2023, Brightline began a nonstop route between Miami and Orlando on the FEC, passing through Vero Beach without stopping.

== Government ==
The city government of Vero Beach follows a Council-manager model form of government with a five-member city council as the elected governing body, from which a mayor is selected by fellow members, responsible for legislative functions such as establishing policy, passing local ordinances, voting appropriations, and developing an overall vision alongside a city manager hired by city council to oversee the administrative operations, implement its policies, and advise it. Members of the city council serve two-year terms with staggered elections.

== Public safety ==
=== Fire Rescue ===
Indian River County Fire Rescue provides fire protection and emergency medical services to the citizens of Vero Beach. There are three fire stations assigned to the city:

- Station 1 – Engine 1, Rescue 1, Ladder 1.
- Station 2 – Engine 2, Rescue 2, Dive Rescue 2.
- Station 3 – Engine 3, Rescue 3, ARFF 3.

=== Police Department ===
The Vero Beach Police Department provides police protection for the city. Its headquarters is located at 1055 20th Street, Vero Beach, FL, and it is staffed with approximately 61 sworn officers.

== Education ==
=== Public schools ===
The Indian River County School District operates the following public schools serving Vero Beach:

- Vero Beach High School
- Gifford Middle School
- Oslo Middle School
- Storm Grove Middle School
- Beachland Elementary School
- Citrus Elementary School
- Dodgertown Elementary School
- Glendale Elementary School
- Indian River Academy (elementary)
- Liberty Magnet School (elementary)
- Osceola Magnet School (elementary)
- Rosewood Magnet School (elementary)
- Vero Beach Elementary School
- Alternative Center for Education

==== Charter schools ====
- Indian River Charter High School
- Imagine South Vero
- North County Charter Elementary
- St. Peter's Academy

=== Private schools ===
- Trinity Episcopal School; grades pre-K-3
- Saint Edward's School. Independent College Preparatory in Episcopal School Tradition; grades pre-K–12
- St. Helen Catholic School
- Masters Academy; grades pre-K–12
- Tabernacle Christian School; grades K–8
- SunCoast School; grades pre-K–8

=== Colleges ===
- Indian River State College – Mueller Campus
- Treasure Coast Technical College

== Notable people ==
Sandy Koufax

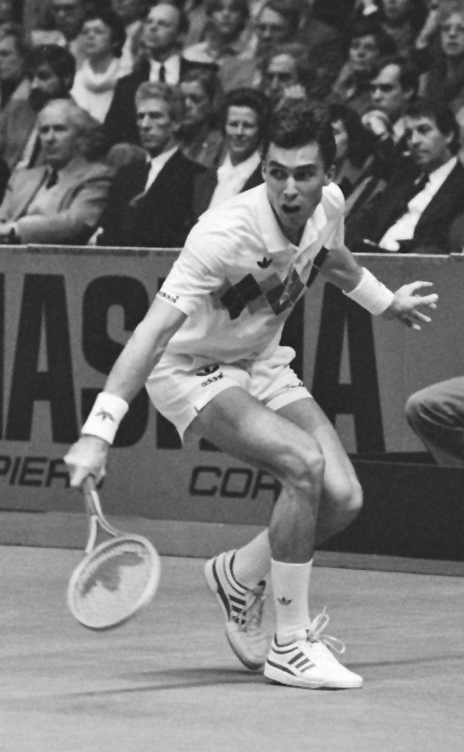
Ivan Lendl

- Fred Barnes, journalist, editor of The Weekly Standard and Fox News contributor
- Lake Bell, actress, attended school in Vero Beach and her film I Do... Until I Don't is set there
- Jade Cargill, professional wrestler signed to WWE and fitness model
- Alex Cobb, pitcher for the Los Angeles Angels, attended Vero Beach High School
- Gloria Estefan, singer, has a house and owns a hotel in Vero Beach
- Tom Fadden, actor
- Prince Fielder, former professional MLB baseball player
- Mardy Fish, former professional tennis player and Olympic Silver medalist
- Calvin Souther Fuller, inventor of the solar cell, died 1994
- Horace Gifford, architect
- David Alan Gore, serial killer
- Karl F. Hausauer, Adjutant General of New York
- Carl Hiaasen, journalist, novelist, and author
- Sandy Koufax, former MLB professional baseball player, member of the Baseball Hall of Fame
- Ivan Lendl, former professional tennis player, member of the Tennis Hall of Fame
- Richard Littlejohn, columnist for the Daily Mail, lives in Vero Beach
- JT, hip hop artist and member of City Girls
- Debbie Mayfield, Florida state senator
- F. James McDonald, former president and chief operating officer of General Motors
- Alison Mosshart, lead singer of The Kills and The Dead Weather
- Mark Mulvoy, sports journalist and Sports Illustrated managing editor
- Jake Owen, country music singer-songwriter, graduate of Vero Beach High School, 1999
- Peter George Peterson, co-founder, Blackstone Group
- Albert Reed, model, 2007 Dancing with the Stars competitor, actor, graduate of Vero Beach High School, 2003
- Priscilla Renea, singer-songwriter signed to Capitol Records, debut album entitled "Jukebox" released in 2009
- Norman Sas, inventor of Electric Football
- Waldo E. Sexton, early settler and pioneer
- Parvati Shallow, winner of Survivor: Micronesia, runner-up in Survivor: Heroes vs. Villains
- Eric Smith, former professional football player for the Chicago Bears of the National Football League
- Bryan Stork, former professional football player for the Washington Redskins of the NFL
- Roscoe Tanner, former professional tennis player
- Rick Wiles, Christian broadcaster and antisemitic conspiracy theorist
