= Hallstrom House =

Historic house in Florida, United States

- U.S. National Register of Historic Places
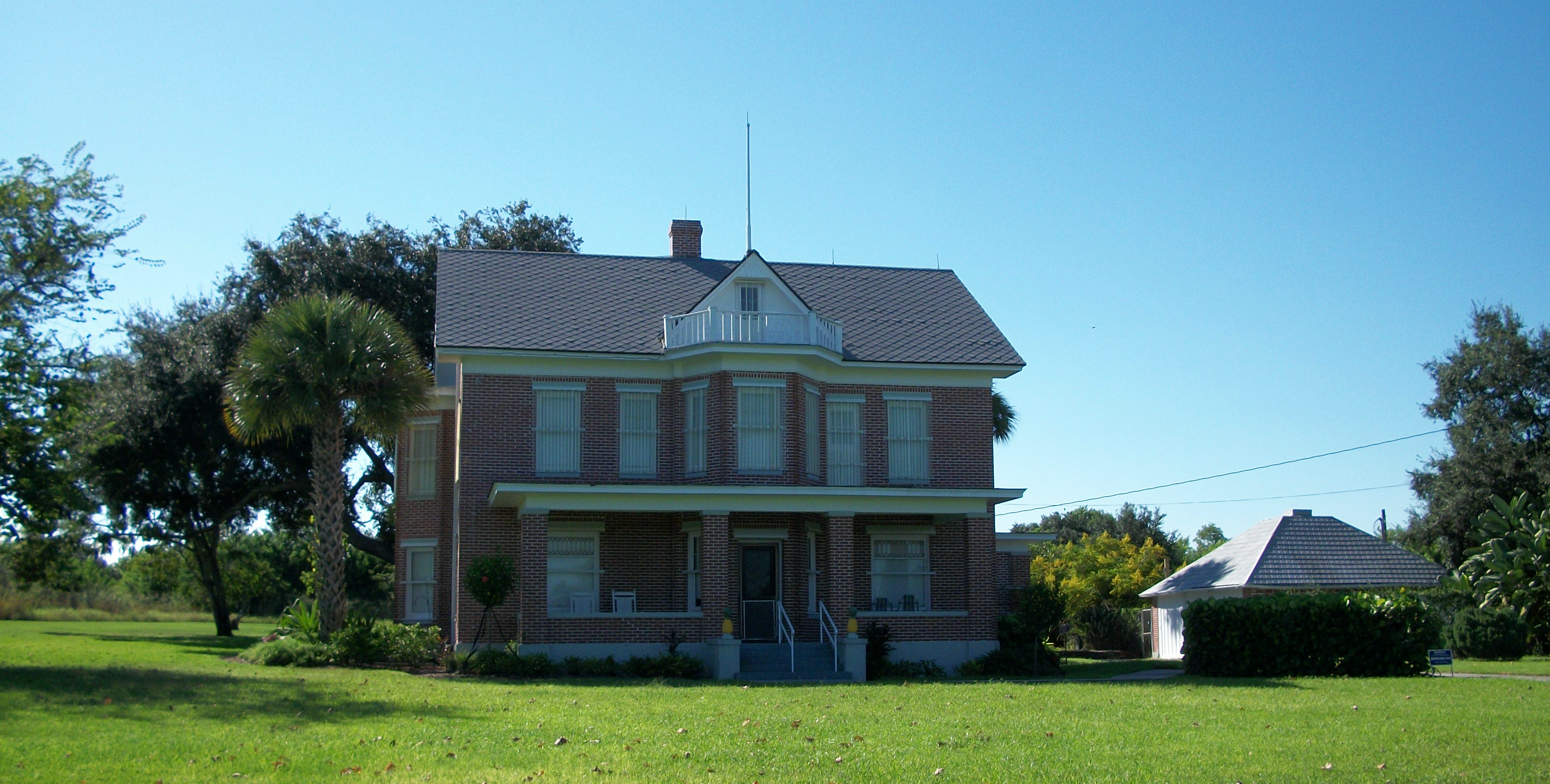

- Location within Florida Location within the United States
- Location: 1723 SW Old Dixie Highway; Vero Beach, Florida 32962
- Coordinates: 27°34′16″N 80°22′31″W
- Area: 5.0 acres (2.0 ha)
- Built: 1918
- Architect: Axel Hallstrom
- Architectural style: Masonry Vernacular
- NRHP reference No.: 02000605
- Added to NRHP: June 6, 2002

The Hallstrom House (also known as the Hallstrom Farmstead) is a historic house in Oslo, Florida. It is located at 1723 Southwest Old Dixie Highway.

== Description and history ==
Beginning as a 40-acre (160,000 m^{2}) pineapple plantation in 1909 the main house was erected by Swedish horticulturist Axel Hallström. With help from Norse and Swedish craftsmen, the structure was completed in 1918. Later on, after Axel moved on to the citrus business, he eventually moved out. After Axel Hallström's death in 1966, his daughter continued the citrus business until the 1980s. In July 2000, efforts to preserve the remaining 5-acre (20,000 m^{2}) plantation were achieved when Ruth Hallström willed them for the sole purpose of preserving the farmhouse. On June 6, 2002, the farmhouse was added to the United States National Register of Historic Places.
