= Osceola Park Historic Residential District =

Historic district in Florida, United States

- U.S. National Register of Historic Places
- U.S. Historic district
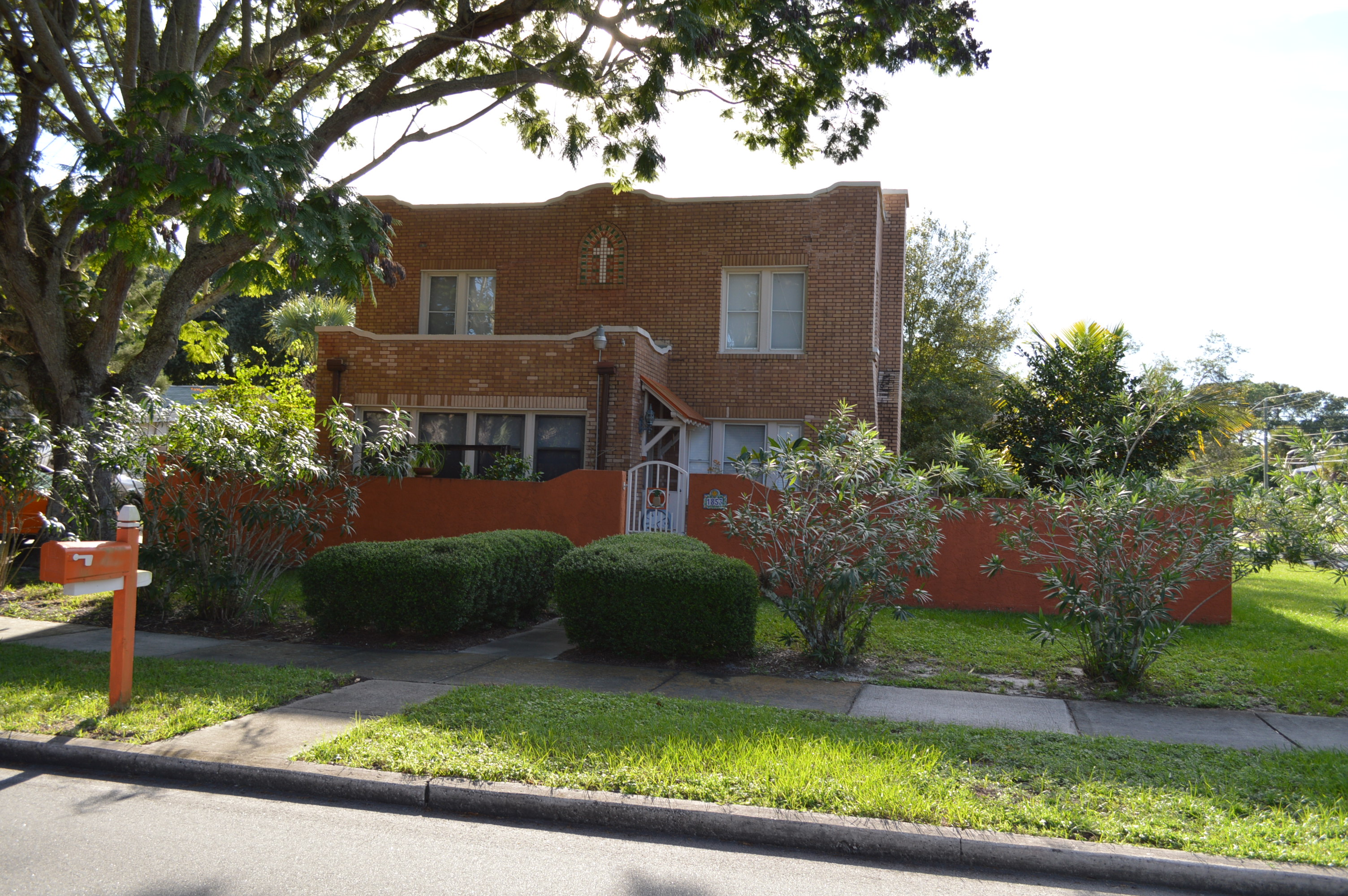

- Location within Florida Location within the United States
- Location: Vero Beach, Florida
- Coordinates: 27.636271°N 80.407605°W
- NRHP reference No.: 12001196
- Added to NRHP: January 13, 2013

The Osceola Park Historic Residential District is in Vero Beach, Florida. It contains the homes of several former city officials from as far back as the 1920s. On January 13, 2013, it was added to the National Register of Historic Places.

The Osceola Park neighborhood was first developed in 1915 and 1917, with the proposal by the Indian Farms Company for the Little Acre Farms and Osceola Park Homesites subdivisions.

Little Acre Farms featured one-acre lots suitable for a home and a small truck farm. Osceola Park Homesites were 15,000 square foot lots, with some commercial lots along Osceola Boulevard. Later subdivisions included Jacoby's Addition (1923), McCurdy's (1925), and the Little Farms Addition (1954.)
