= Old Vero Beach Community Building =

- U.S. National Register of Historic Places
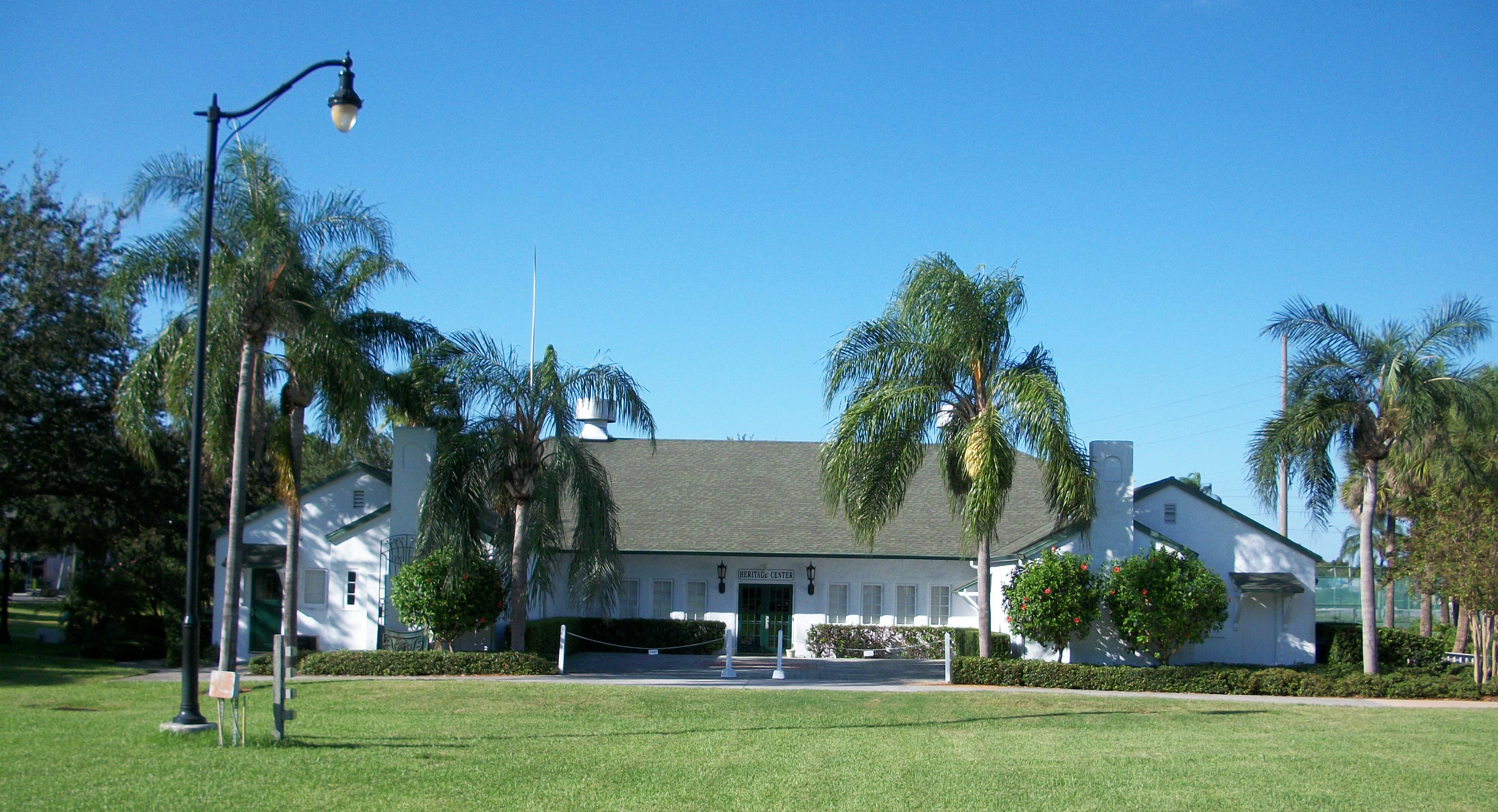

- Location within Florida Location within the United States
- Location: 2146 14th Avenue; Vero Beach, Florida 34960
- Coordinates: 27°38′24″N 80°23′57″W
- Built: 1935, 1943
- Architectural style: Frame Vernacular
- NRHP reference No.: 92001746
- Added to NRHP: January 19, 1993

The Old Vero Beach Community Building (also known as the Vero Beach Service Center, Vero Beach Physical Arts Center, or Heritage Center) is a historic building in Vero Beach, Florida. Located at 2146 14th Avenue, the Vero Beach Community Building was built in 1935 during the New Deal Era, a project that provided residents and visitors alike with social and entertainment activities during the Great Depression. The building served as a social gathering place, playhouse, and meeting hall as well as the Headquarters for the Tourist Club. The Community Building once hosted a zoo that consisted of a bear named "Alice", an alligator, monkeys and other animals. The site of the zoo is now occupied by Pocahantas Park. In 1943 a north wing was added to the building in order for it to become a servingmen's club. Organized by director Dale Wimbrow, the addition consisted of lounge, a restroom, and showers. After World War II, the 1943 addition became the Indian River Citrus Museum. On January 19, 1993, it was added to the U.S. National Register of Historic Places.
