= Pueblo Arcade =

- U.S. National Register of Historic Places
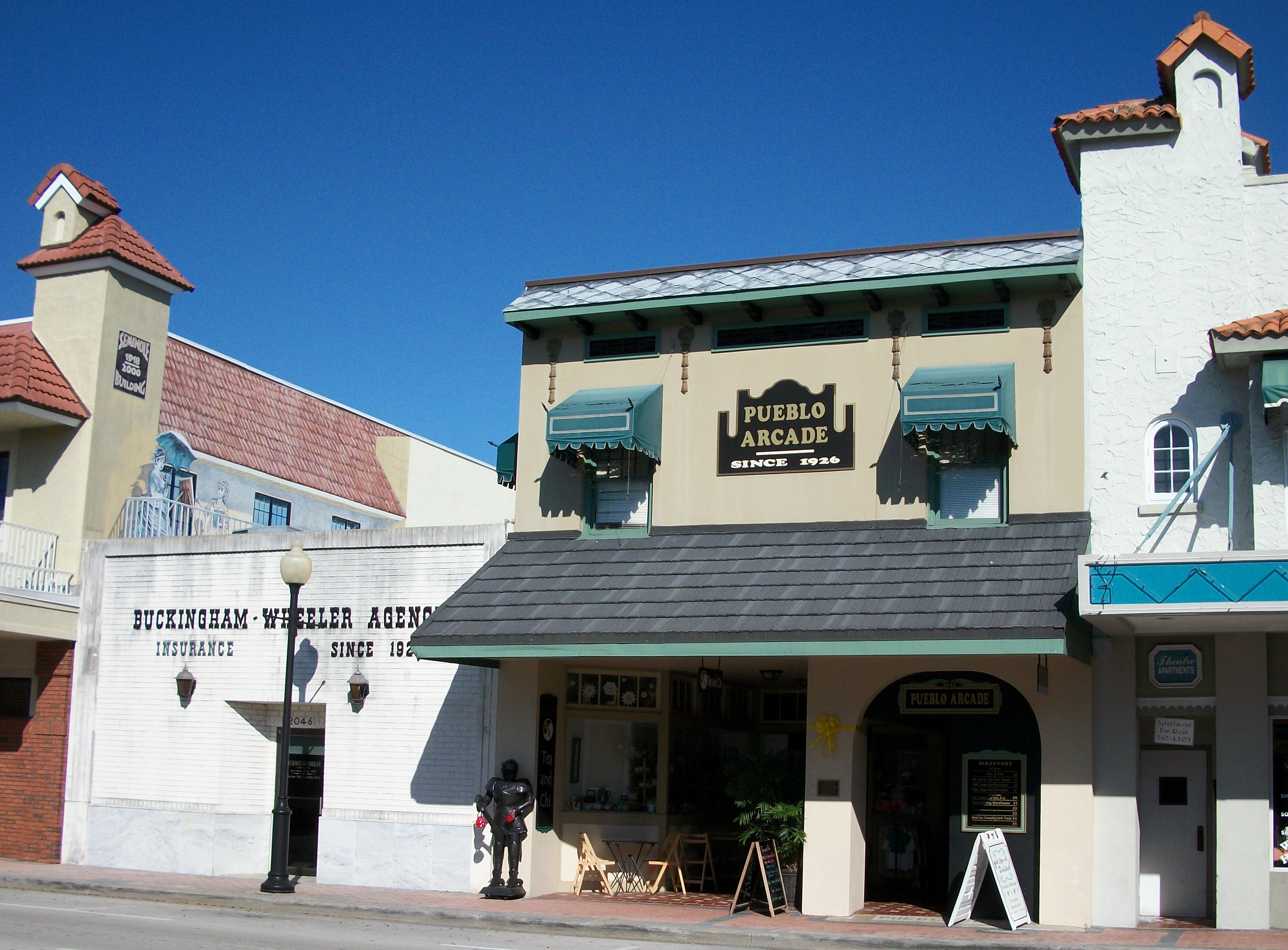

- Location within Florida Location within the United States
- Location: 2044 14th Street; Vero Beach, Florida 32960
- Coordinates: 27°38′23″N 80°24′0″W
- Built: 1926
- Architectural style: Mission Revival, Spanish Revival
- NRHP reference No.: 97000211
- Added to NRHP: March 8, 1997

The Pueblo Arcade is a historic building in Vero Beach, Florida. Located at 2044 14th Avenue, the Pueblo Arcade was built in the Mission/Spanish Revival style in 1926 by local contractors Blackford and Davis. This structure was very popular among the citizens of Vero Beach due to its ingenious design, prior to the introduction of Air Conditioning. It consisted of arcades with shop doorways opening onto a single hallway which opened to the street. The structure was restored by developer Robert L. Brackett and was added to the U.S. National Register of Historic Places on March 8, 1997. Prior to renovation, the location served as the flagship store for DuBose Jewelers, a regional jewelry store chain which opened in Vero in 1912.
