= Royal Park Arcade =

Historic place in Florida, United States

- U.S. National Register of Historic Places
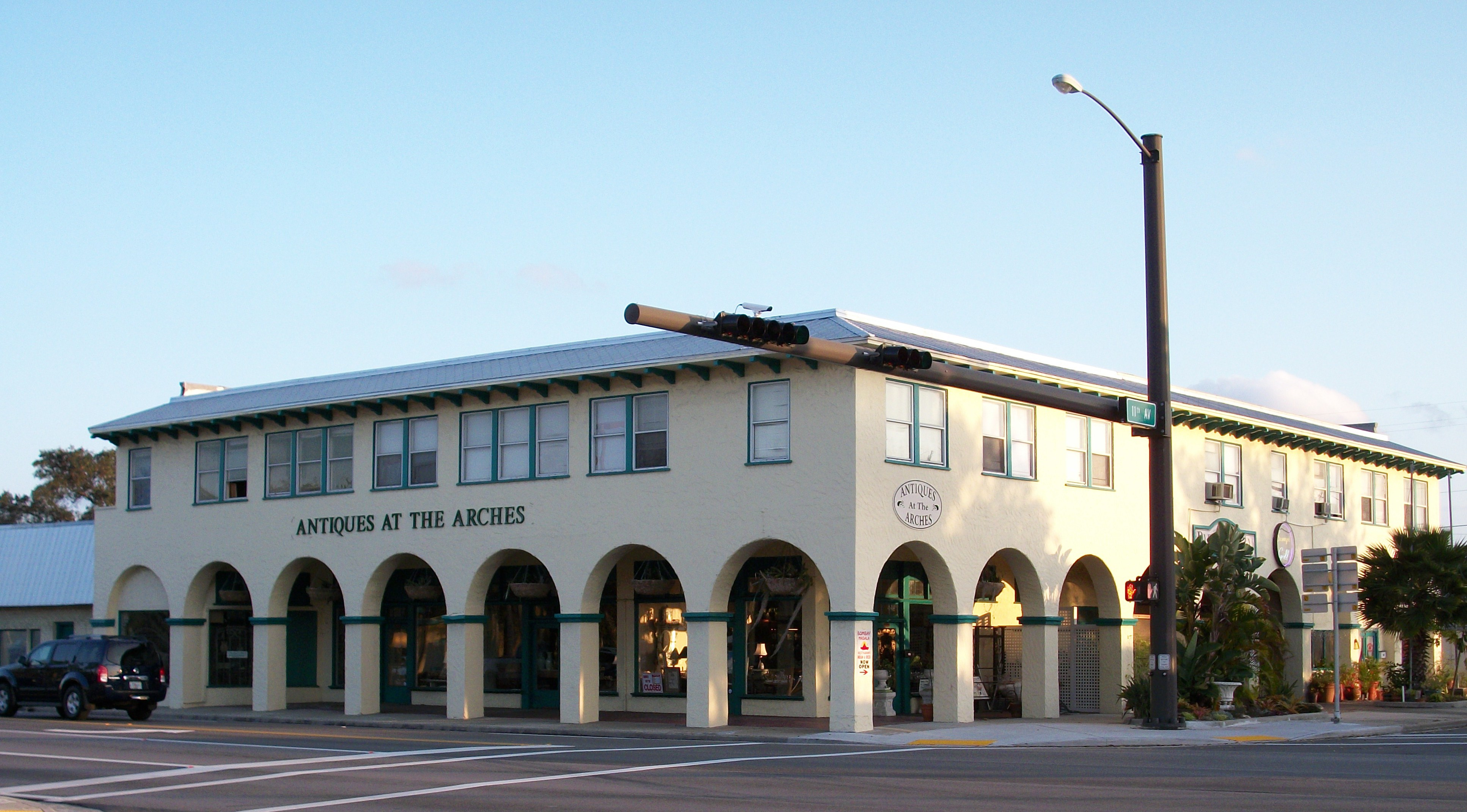

- Location within Florida Location within the United States
- Location: Vero Beach, Florida
- Coordinates: 27°38′21″N 80°23′41″W
- Architectural style: Mediterranean Revival
- NRHP reference No.: 98000925
- Added to NRHP: July 31, 1998

The Royal Park Arcade (also known as the Parkway Plaza) is a historic site in Vero Beach, Florida. It is located at 1059 21st Street. On July 31, 1998, it was added to the U.S. National Register of Historic Places.
