= Old Palmetto Hotel =

- U.S. National Register of Historic Places
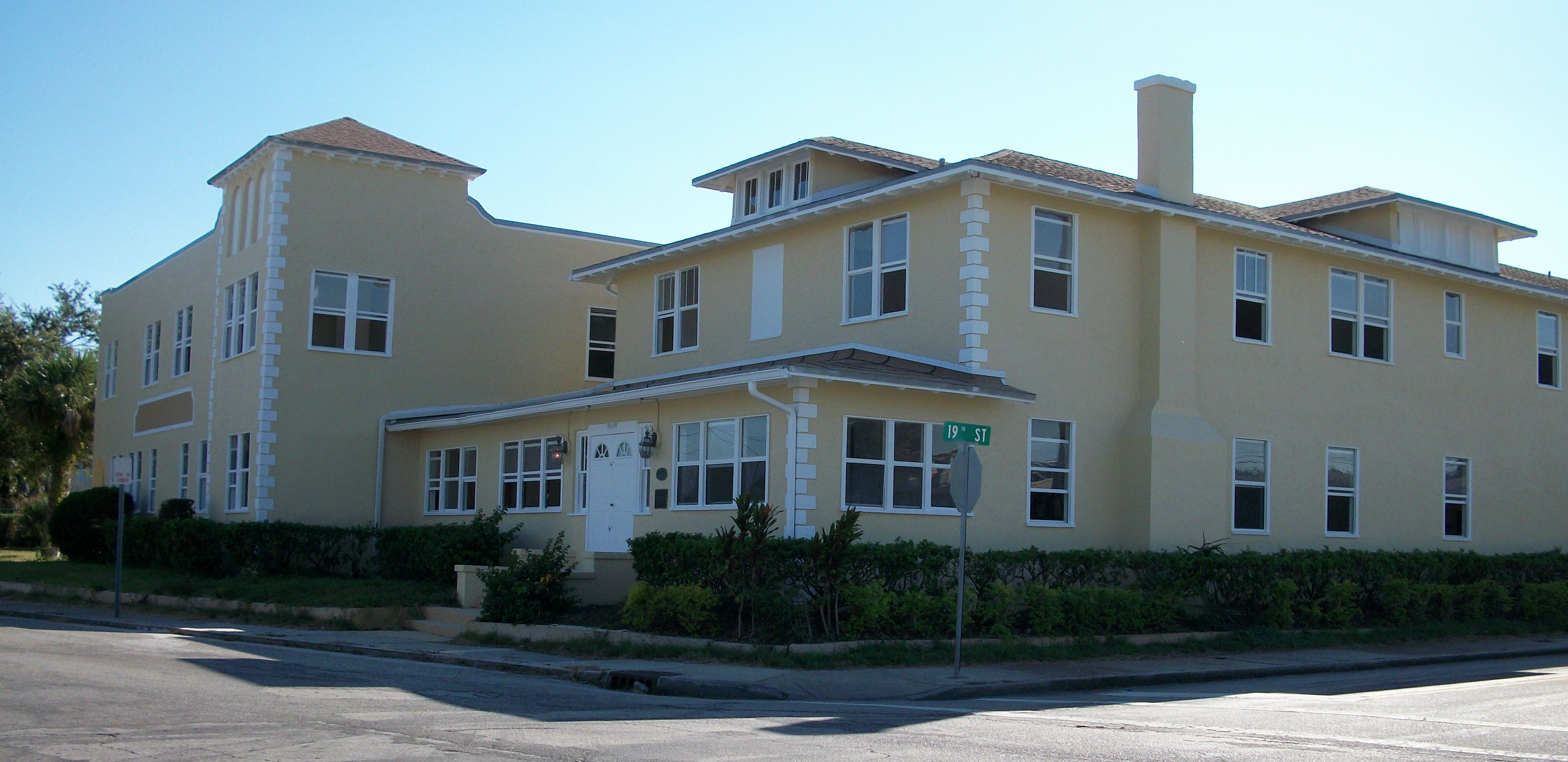

- Location within Florida Location within the United States
- Location: 1889 Old Dixie Highway, Vero Beach, Florida 32960
- Coordinates: 27°38′8″N 80°23′55″W
- Built: 1921, 1926
- NRHP reference No.: 91001650
- Added to NRHP: November 13, 1991

The Old Palmetto Hotel is a historic hotel in Vero Beach, Florida. Located at 1889 Old Dixie Highway the Palmetto Hotel was constructed in 1921 by George W. Gray. The hotel provided a social center for the community as well as a lodging site for the many winter guests who would visit annually. After serving the county offices, it was enlarged in 1926 and in the 1930s it became the Kromhout Apartments, later it became Charlton Apartments, then Skippers Inn, and later in 1989, the Regent Court Apartments. On November 13, 1991, it was added to the U.S. National Register of Historic Places.
