= Old Indian River County Courthouse =

- Indian River County Courthouse
- U.S. National Register of Historic Places
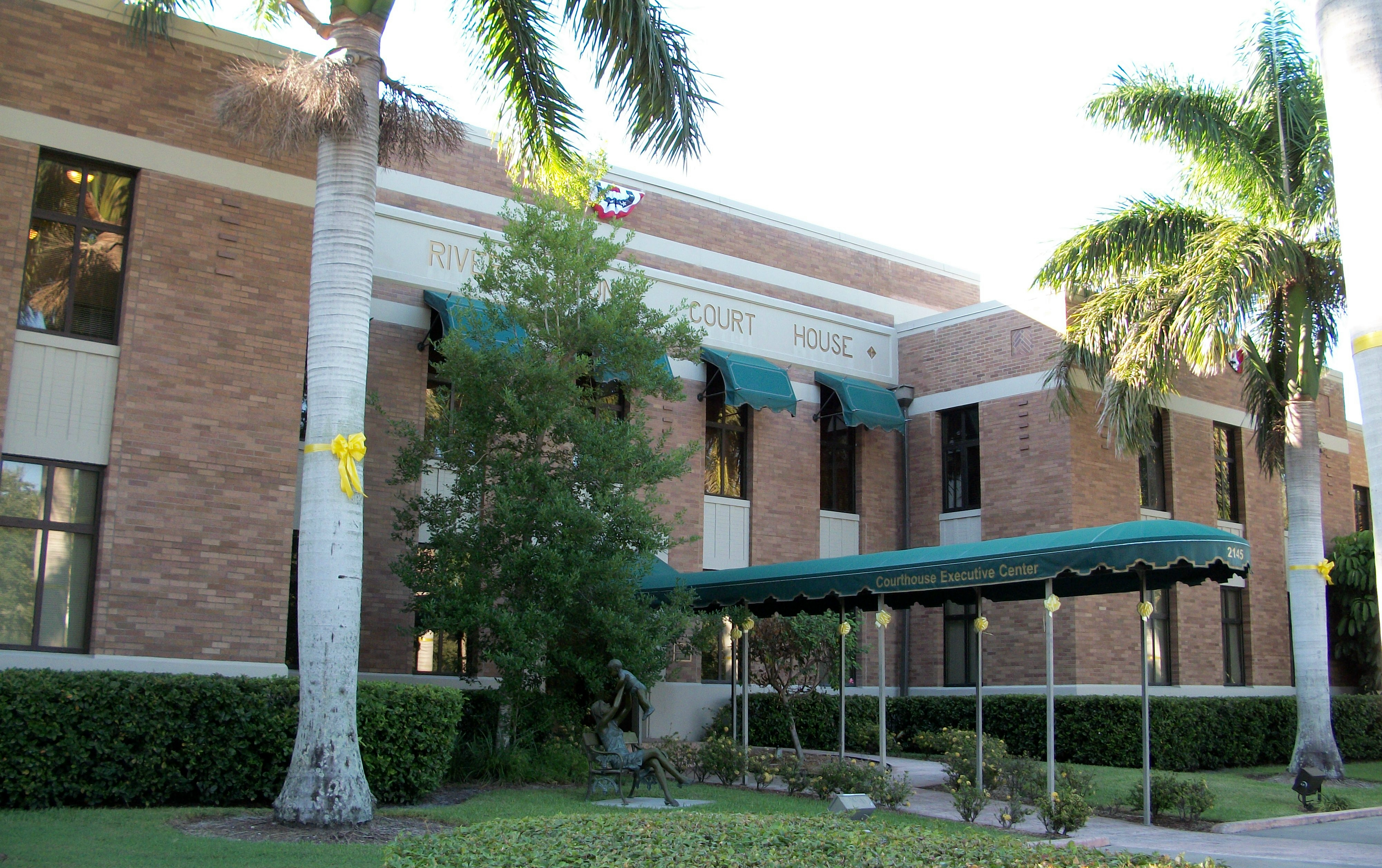

- Location within Florida Location within the United States
- Interactive map showing the location of Old Indian River County Courthouse
- Location: 2145 14th Avenue; Vero Beach, Florida 32960
- Coordinates: 27°38′23″N 80°23′59″W
- Built: 1937
- Architect: W. H. Garns
- Architectural style: Masonry Vernacular, Art Moderne
- NRHP reference No.: 99000768
- Added to NRHP: July 19, 1999

The Old Indian River County Courthouse is a historic courthouse in Vero Beach, Florida. Located at 2145 14th Avenue, the Old Indian River County Courthouse was constructed from April 1936 to March 1937 in the Masonry Vernacular, Art Moderne style by architect W.H. Garns. The structure was built by James T. Vocelle after he sought federal funding during 1933 and 1934 from the Public Works Administration to build the newly formed county a courthouse. The structure later became the Courthouse Executive Center after the county courthouse moved its seat to a new building at 2000 16th Avenue. On July 19, 1999, the Old Indian River County Courthouse was added to the U.S. National Register of Historic Places.
