= Vero Theatre =

- U.S. National Register of Historic Places
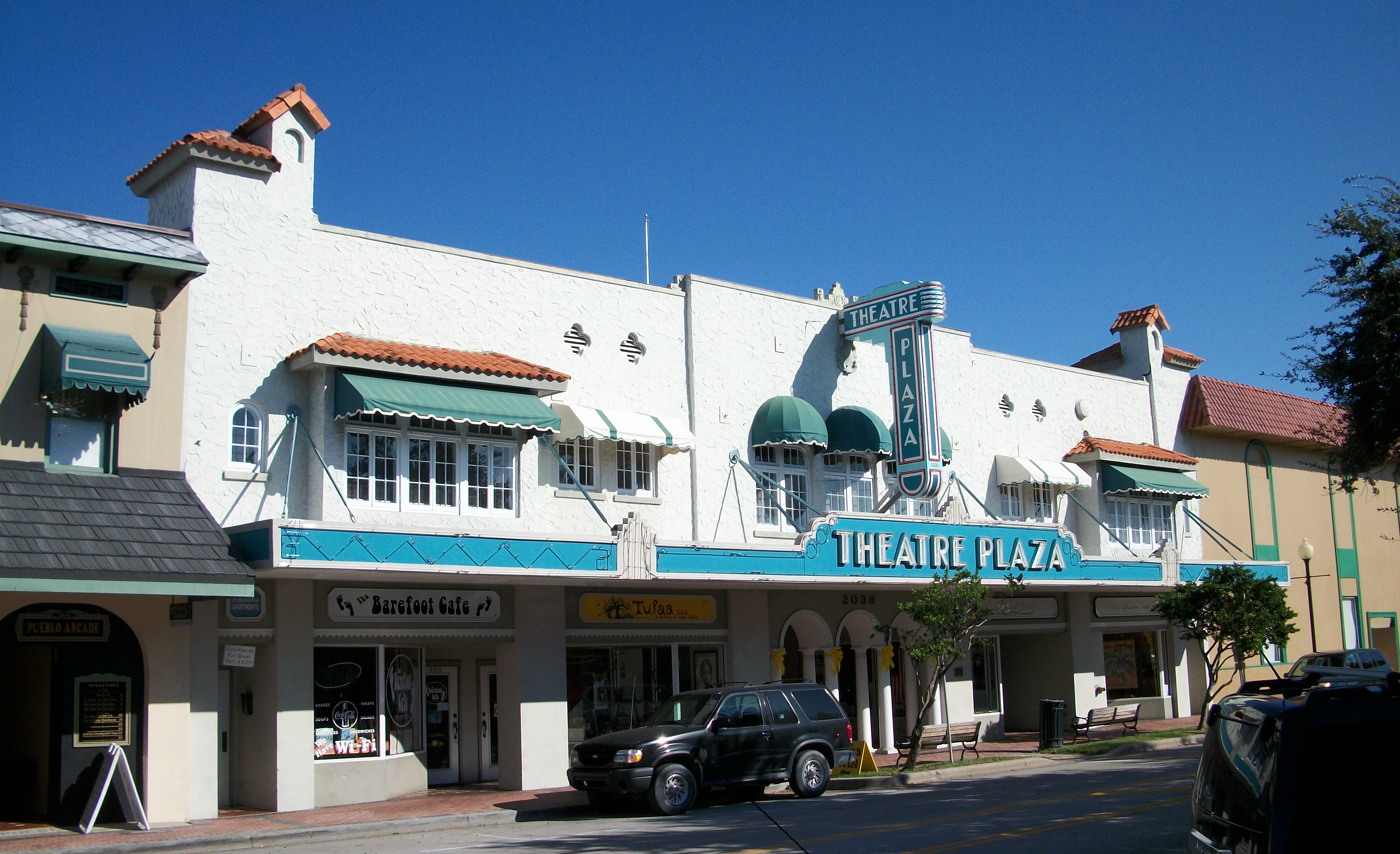

- Location within Florida Location within the United States
- Location: 2036 14th Avenue; Vero Beach, Florida 32960
- Coordinates: 27°38′20″N 80°23′57″W
- Built: 1924
- Architect: F.H. Trimble
- Architectural style: Mediterranean Revival
- NRHP reference No.: 92000421
- Added to NRHP: April 28, 1992

The Vero Theatre (also known as the Florida Theatre or Theatre Plaza) is a historic theater in Vero Beach, Florida. Located at 2036 14th Avenue, the Vero Theatre was designed in the Mediterranean Revival style by architect F.H. Trimble. It opened on October 14, 1924, as the city's first motion picture theater with its first feature film being the Hunchback of Notre Dame. The theatre became the center of the fight to remove Indian River from St. Lucie County as a result of local blue laws prohibiting Sunday film viewing. Governor John W. Martin created Indian River County in the theatre in May 1925. On April 28, 1992, it was added to the U.S. National Register of Historic Places. The Theatre closed in 1985 when other multiplex theatres opened nearby. The last film shown was Desperately Seeking Susan.

The building is one of the few remaining structures of the original downtown. It is currently vacant, though there have been numerous attempts made to renovate the structure. The last attempt at renovation was done by developer Robert L. Brackett. His attempts were halted by the storms of the 2004 Atlantic hurricane season.
