= Bamma Vickers Lawson House =

Historic house in Florida, United States

- U.S. National Register of Historic Places
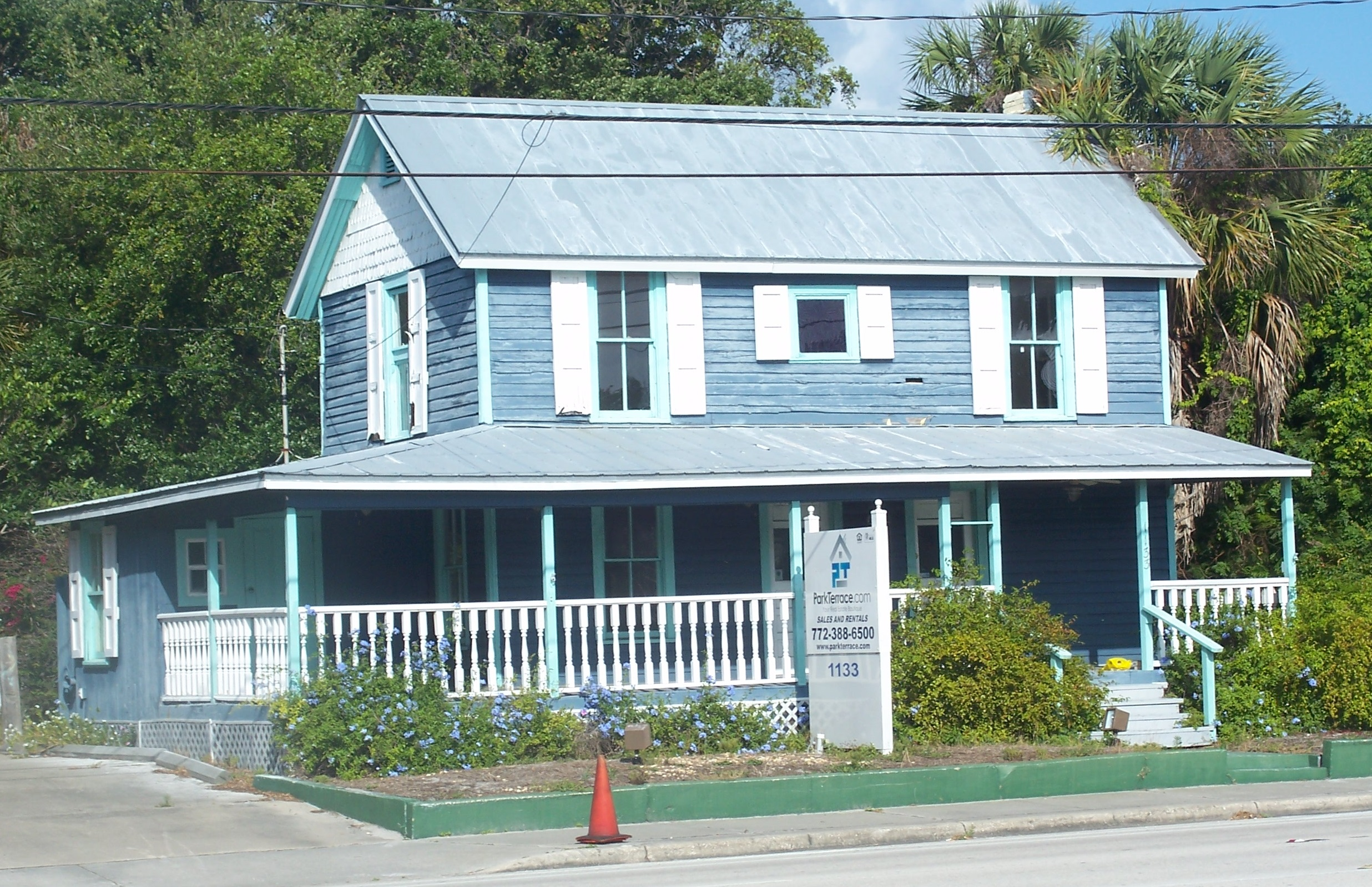

- Location within Florida Location within the United States
- Location: 1133 U.S. Route 1, Sebastian, Florida
- Coordinates: 27°48′48″N 80°28′5″W
- Area: less than one acre
- Built: 1911
- Architect: Parris Perham Lawson
- Architectural style: Vernacular frame
- NRHP reference No.: 90001116
- Added to NRHP: July 26, 1990

The Bamma Vickers Lawson House (also known as the Lawson House or Parris Lawson House) is a historic house located at 1133 U.S. Route 1 in Sebastian, Florida.

== Description and history ==
It was added to the National Register of Historic Places on July 26, 1990.
