= Vero Beach Diesel Power Plant =

Historic power plant in Vero Beach, Florida

- U.S. National Register of Historic Places
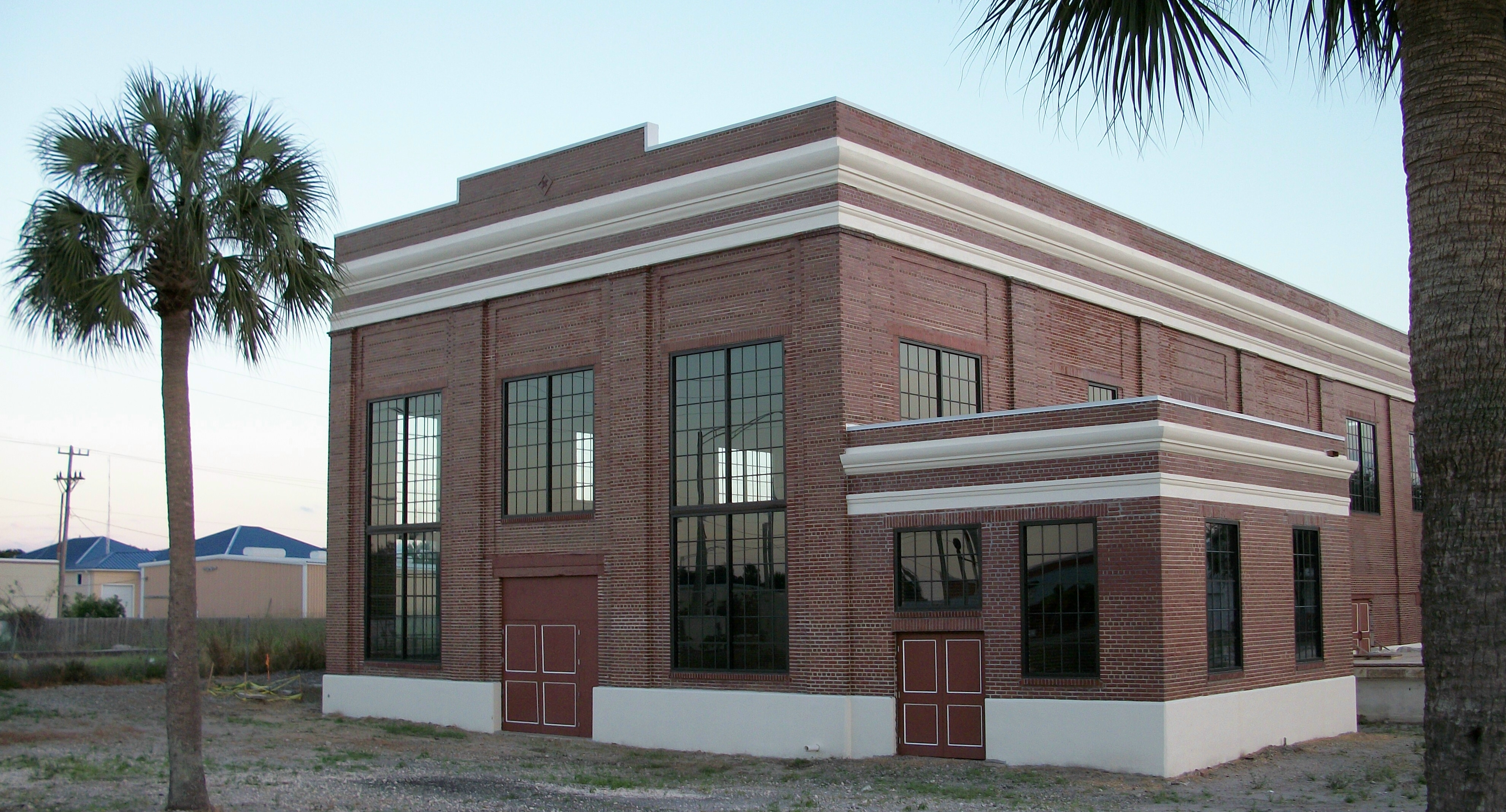

- Location within Florida Location within the United States
- Location: 1246 19th Street; Vero Beach, Florida 32960
- Coordinates: 27°38′13″N 80°23′50″W
- Built: 1926
- Architect: Carter and Damerow
- Architectural style: Masonry Vernacular
- NRHP reference No.: 99000252
- Added to NRHP: February 26, 1999

The Vero Beach Diesel Power Plant (also known as the City of Vero Beach Municipal Power Plant) is a historic power plant in Vero Beach, Florida. Located at 1133 19th Place, the Vero Beach Diesel Power Plant was built in 1926 replacing an earlier power plant due to the areas extensive growth. It was built in the masonry vernacular style by architects Carter and Damerow and by the engineering firm of Kennard and Sons. The structure was the city's first public utilitarian facility. It is also the city's oldest municipal building. On February 26, 1999, it was added to the U.S. National Register of Historic Places. In June 2016, the Diesel Plant was sold to real estate developer Michael R. Rechter. Following a $6 million renovation, the building and property were adapted and reutilized as American Icon Brewery - a brewpub/production brewery which opened in September 2017.
