= Old Town Sebastian Historic District, West =

Historic district in Florida, United States

- Old Town Sebastian Historic District West
- U.S. National Register of Historic Places
- U.S. Historic district
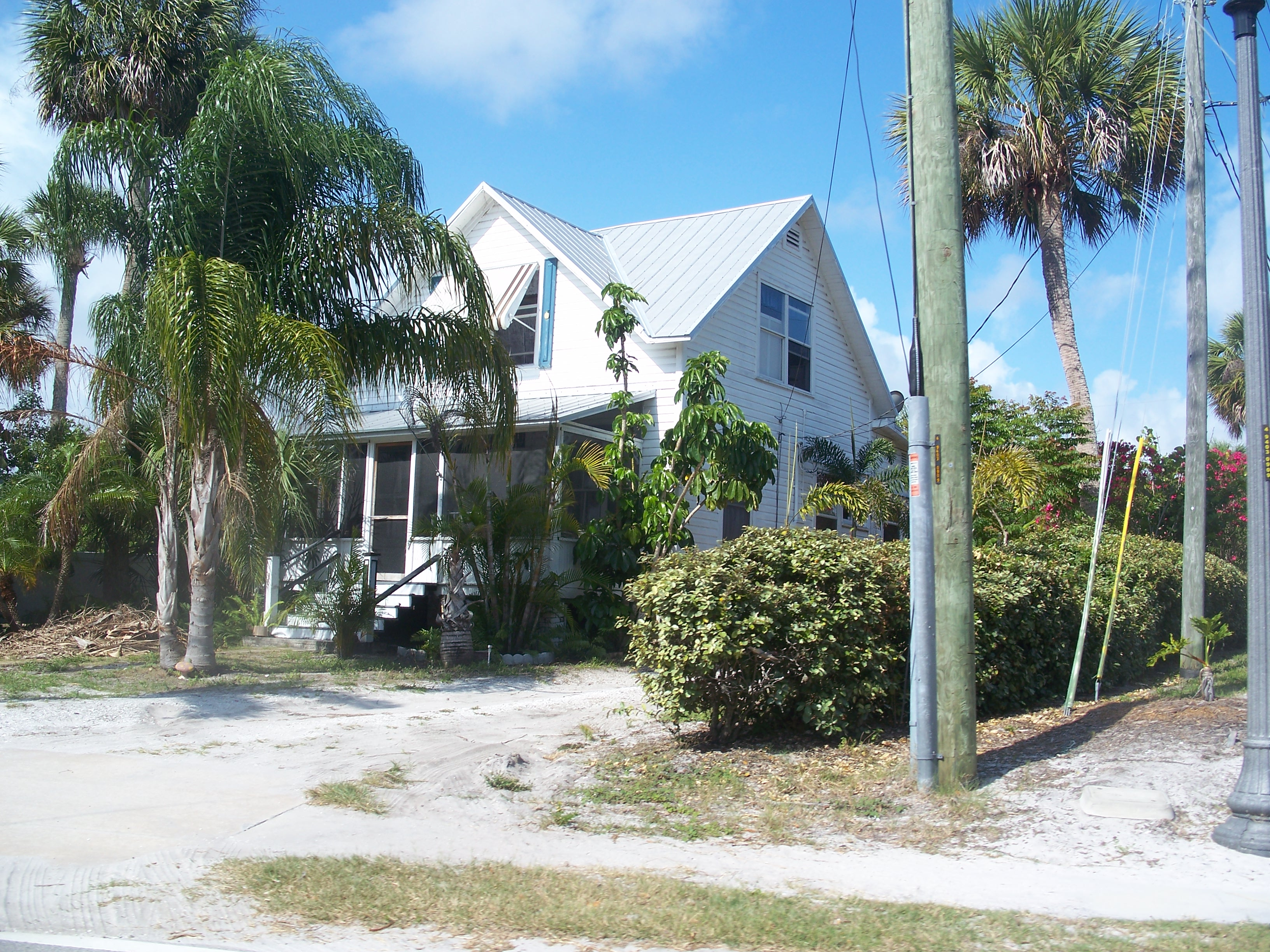

- Location within Florida Location within the United States
- Location: Sebastian, Florida
- Coordinates: 27°48′59″N 80°28′23″W
- Area: 8 acres (32,000 m^{2})
- NRHP reference No.: 03001364
- Added to NRHP: January 6, 2004

The Old Town Sebastian Historic District West is a United States historic district (designated as such on January 6, 2004) located in Sebastian, Florida. The district is bounded by Palmetto Ave, Lake and Main Streets. It contains 15 historic buildings.
