= Vero Beach Woman's Club =

- U.S. National Register of Historic Places
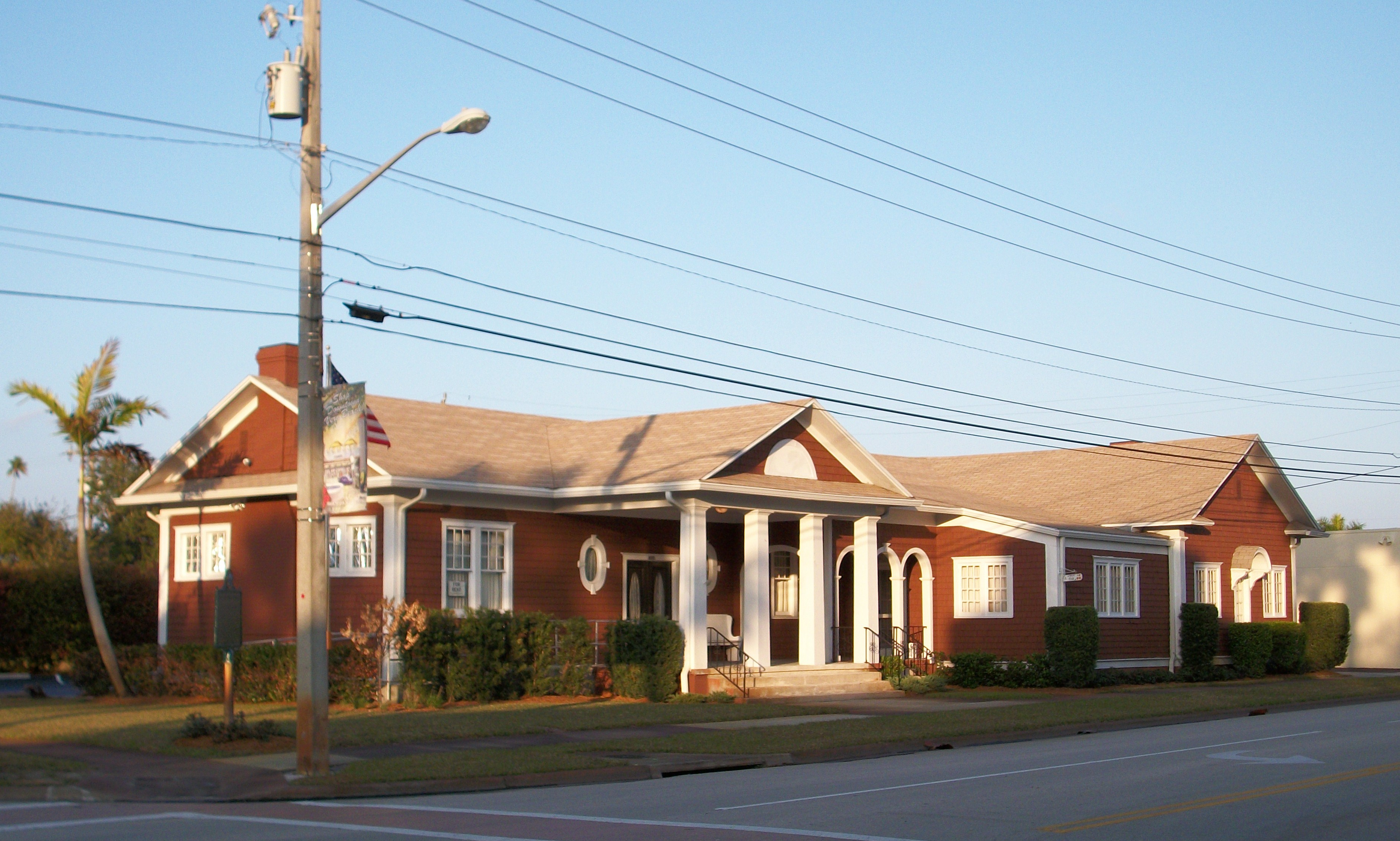

- Location within Florida Location within the United States
- Location: 1534 21st Street; Vero Beach, Florida 32960
- Coordinates: 27°38′23″N 80°24′0″W
- Built: 1916
- Architectural style: Frame Vernacular
- NRHP reference No.: 95000051
- Added to NRHP: February 10, 1995

The Vero Beach Woman's Club is a historic woman's club in Vero Beach, Florida. It is located at 1534 21st Street. On February 10, 1995, it was added to the U.S. National Register of Historic Places.

== History ==
Irene Young, wife of Vero Beach's first mayor Anthony W. Young founded the Vero Beach Woman's Unity Club. The club originally met at the Sleepy Eye Lodge until land was donated by Indian River Farms Company to erect the current building. Completed in 1916 the clubhouse was built adjacent to the Young's house. The club was responsible for many beautification and civic projects. One of their most revered achievements could be the foundation of the Vero Beach Library. After organizing Vero's first public library in the Sleepy Eye Lodge during the summer of 1915, they decided to transform portions of their own clubhouse into Vero's second. On February 16, 1915, Vero Beach's second library was founded with the helpful donations of Mrs. Hard who donated 300 books, and Waldo E. Sexton who donated cypress and black walnut tables and desks. The club adopted the slogan "A beautiful Vero Beach and surrounding country, the best place on earth to live." The clubhouse is still used for meetings and events.

== See also ==
List of Registered Historic Woman's Clubhouses in Florida
