= Old Town Sebastian Historic District, East =

Historic district in Florida, United States

- U.S. National Register of Historic Places
- U.S. Historic district
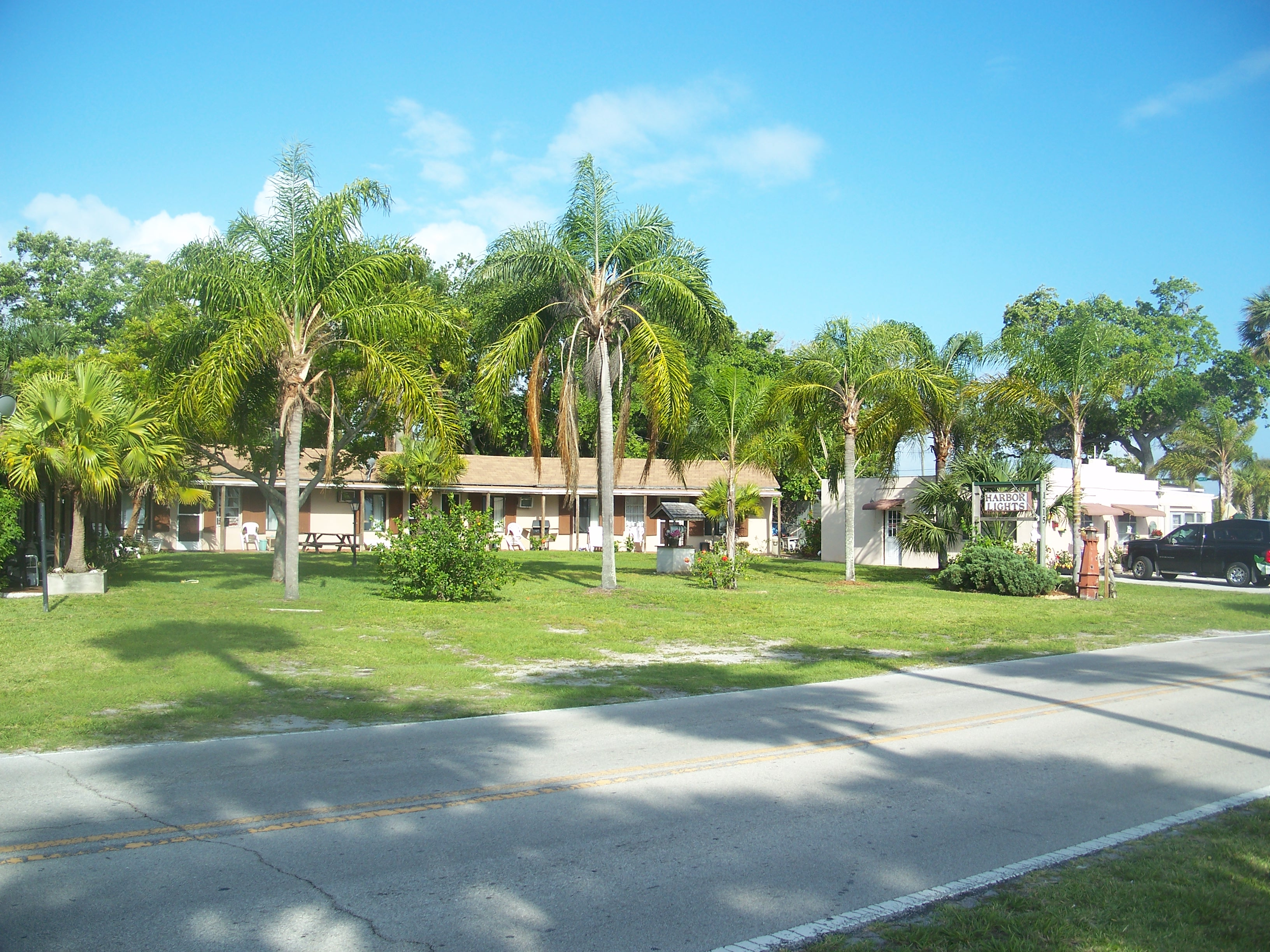
- Harbor Light Motel, a contributing property to the district

- Location within Florida Location within the United States
- Location: Sebastian, Florida
- Coordinates: 27°48′58″N 80°28′9″W
- Area: 90 acres (360,000 m^{2})
- NRHP reference No.: 03000728
- Added to NRHP: August 4, 2003

The Old Town Sebastian Historic District, East is a U.S. historic district (designated as such on August 4, 2003) located in Sebastian, Florida. The district is bounded by Main and Washington Streets, Riverside Drive, and the FEC Railroad. It contains 13 historic buildings.

== Gallery ==
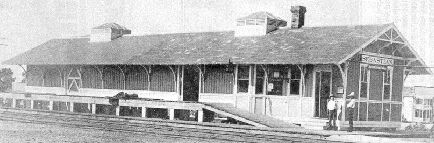
The 1893-built Florida East Coast Railroad station, formerly in the district, now in Fort Pierce

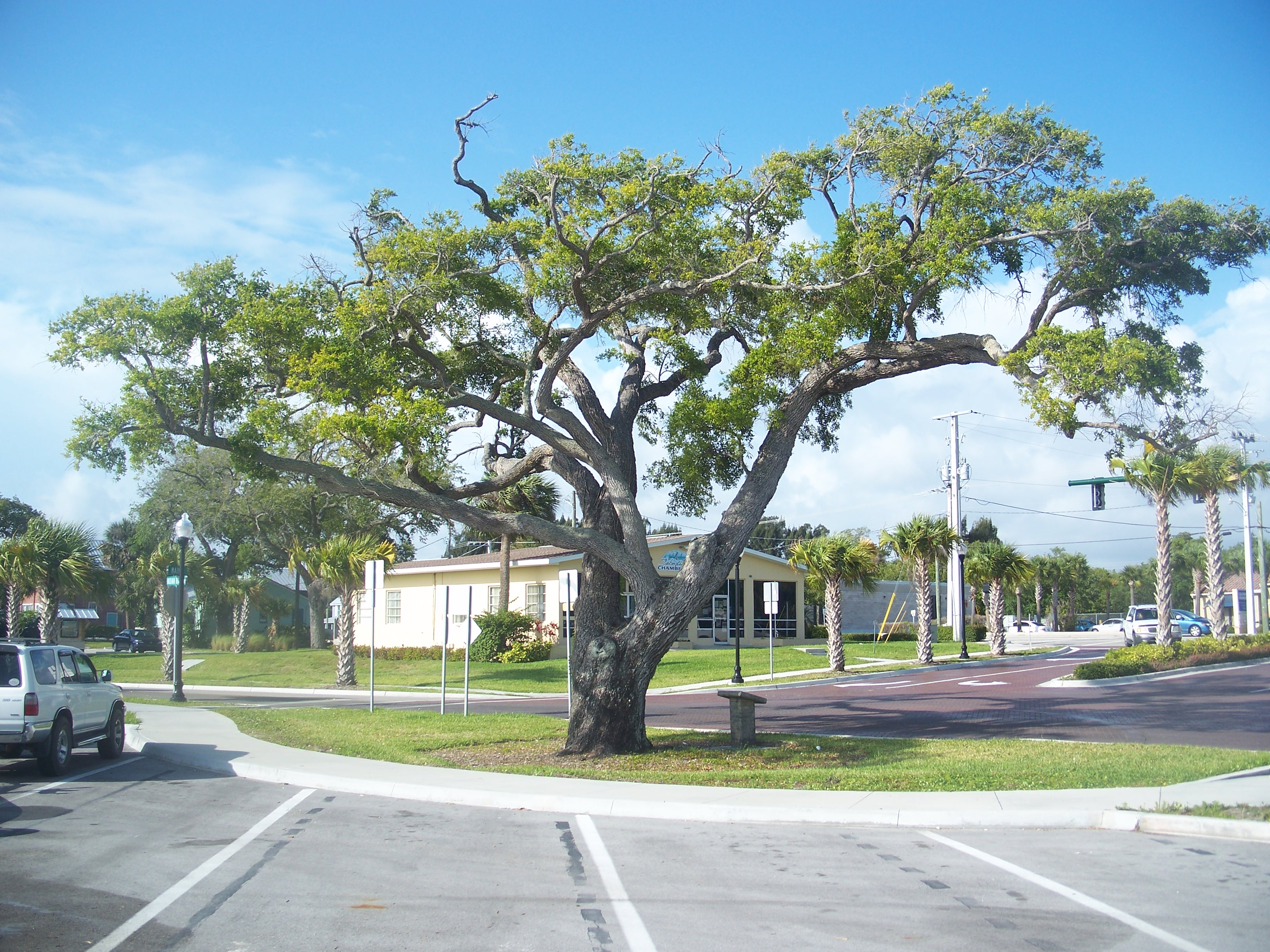
Hardee Oak, planted in 1891

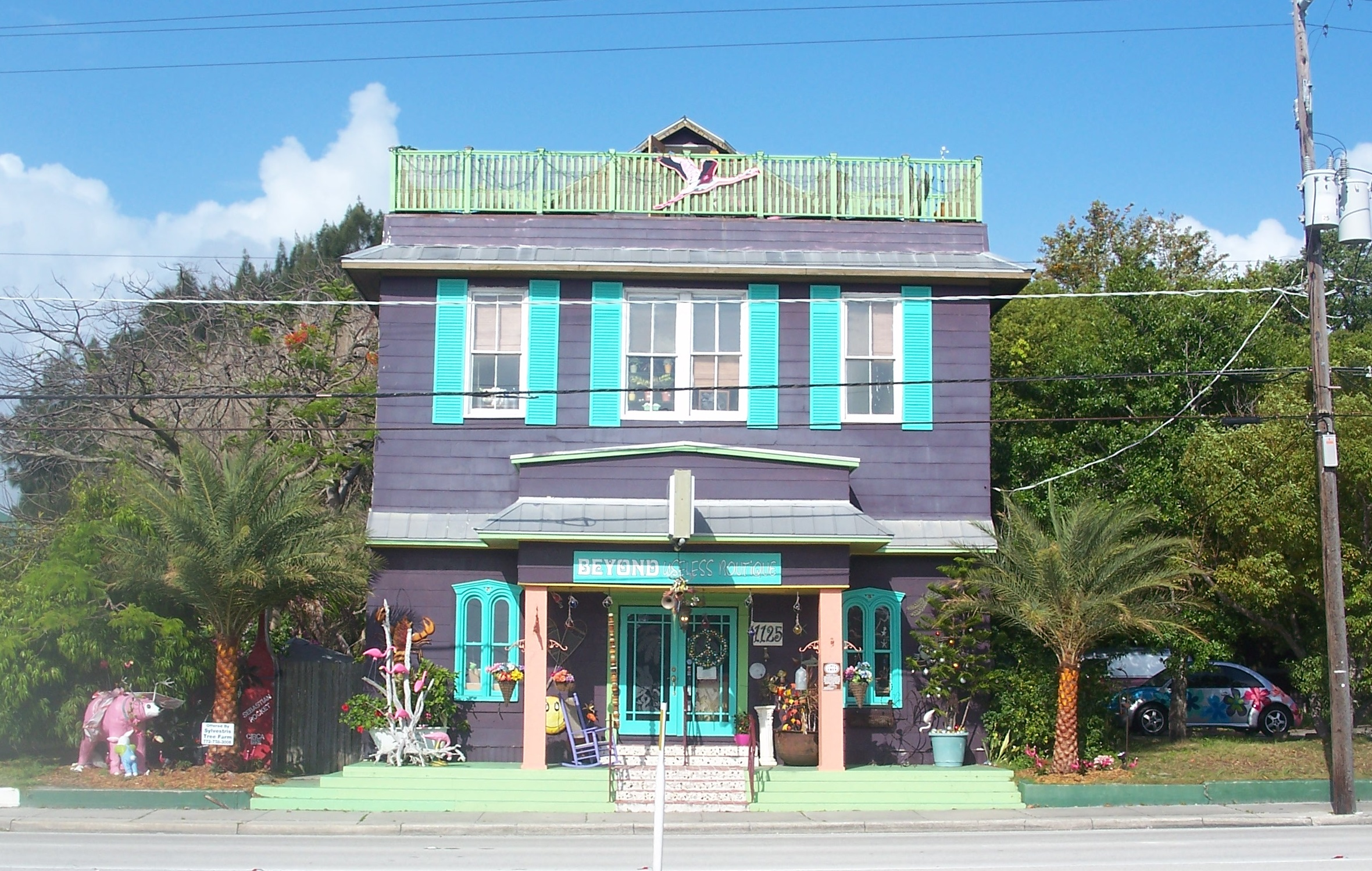
Building in the district

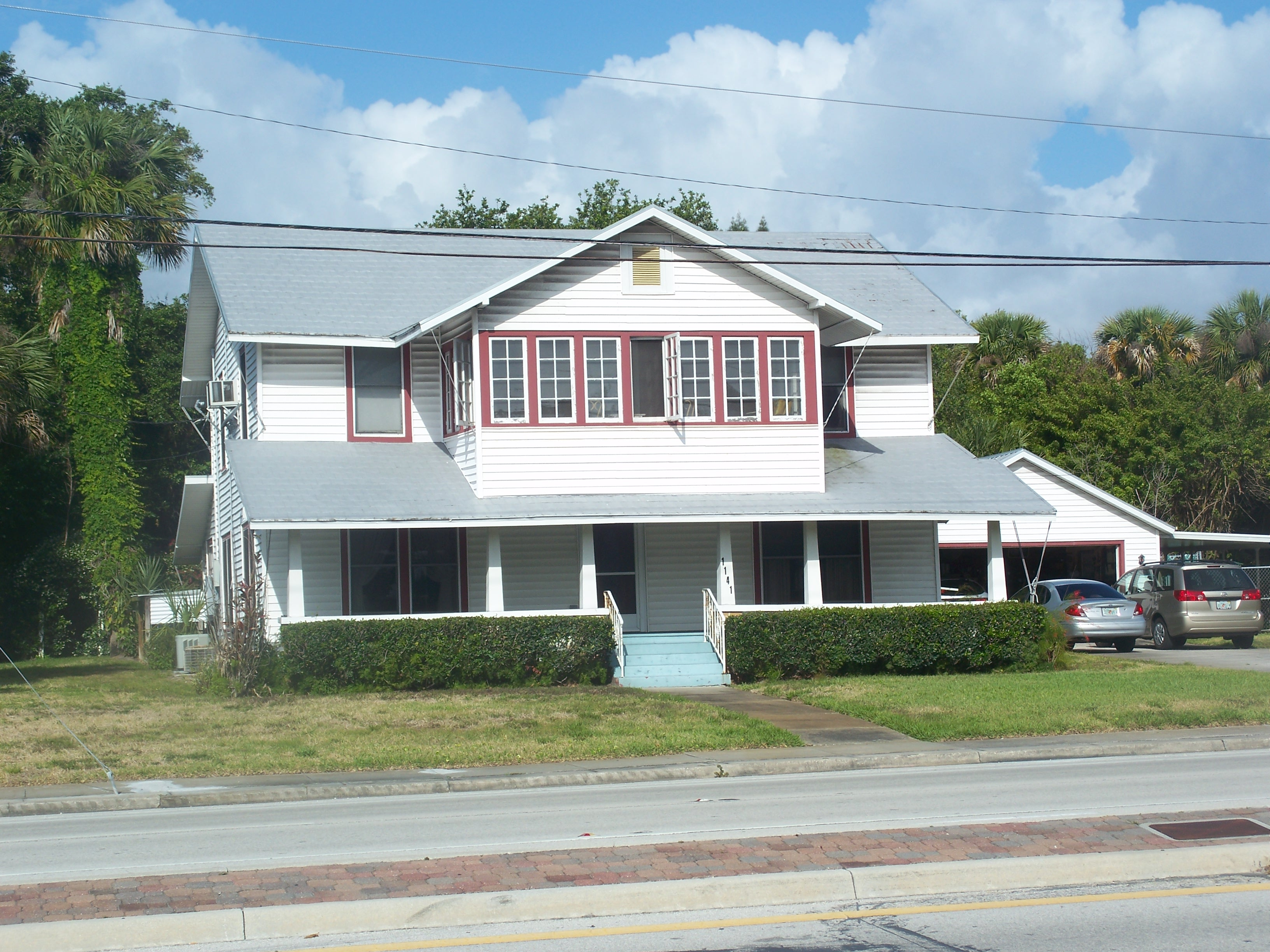
Building in the district
