= North Hutchinson Island =

Island in Florida, United States

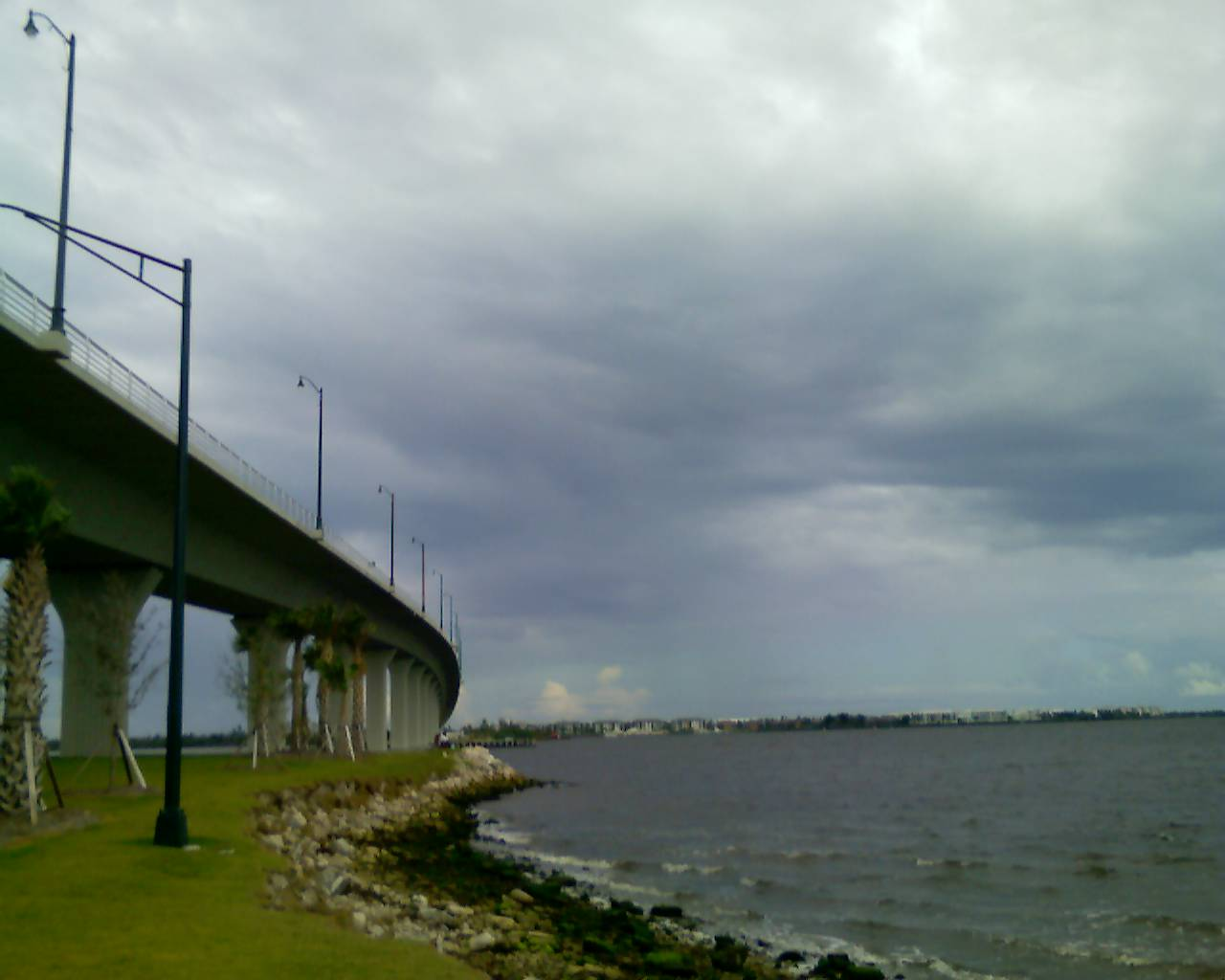
- The Ernest Lyons Bridge in Sewall's Point, Florida, which carries highway A1A and connects Sewall's Point to North Hutchinson Island.

- North Hutchinson Island North Hutchinson Island (North Atlantic)

Geography
- Location: North Atlantic
- Coordinates: 27°33′25″N 80°19′29″W
- Area: 61.8 km^{2} (23.9 sq mi)
- Length: 45 km (28 mi)

Administration
- United States
- State: Florida
- Counties: St. Lucie, Indian River

North Hutchinson Island is a coastal barrier island in Indian River and St. Lucie counties on the east coast of Florida in the United States. The island is adjacent to the Atlantic Ocean and is separated from the mainland on the west by the Indian River Lagoon. The portion of the island in Indian River County is known as Orchid Island.

== Description ==
North Hutchinson Island is an Atlantic barrier island located on Florida's Treasure Coast approximately 110 miles (180 km) north of Fort Lauderdale. The island extends from the Sebastian Inlet on the north to the Fort Pierce Inlet on the south, and is about 28 miles (45 km) long. It has an area of 23.86 square miles (61.8 km^{2}).

The island was once included with the barrier island (Hutchinson Island) to the south as "Hutchinson Island", even though the Fort Pierce Inlet split it into two islands. In 1985, Indian River County renamed its portion of the island "Orchid Island", to distinguish it from the high density development occurring on Hutchinson Island in St. Lucie County.

State Road A1A is the main road for the length of the island, and four bridges provide access to the mainland. For most of its length, A-1-A is known as Atlantic Beach Boulevard. North Hutchinson Island has many county and state parks and preserves, and is one of the few areas on the east coast of Florida with several accreting (growing) beaches.

A number of restaurants, hotels and shops are located on, or easily accessible to the island. Activities on North Hutchinson Island include fishing, snorkeling, boating, kayaking, hiking, biking, surfing, parasurfing, paddleboarding, and wildlife observation. On the northern end of the island is Pelican Island National Wildlife Refuge, the nation's first refuge was established by President Theodore Roosevelt in 1903 with over 5,400 acres (22 km^{2}) of protected waters and lands. Avalon State Park located on A-1-A near the St. Lucie County line provides a number of recreational opportunities and its beach is used by visitors for swimming, snorkeling, surfing, and scuba diving. The area ecosystem provides a habitat for varied marine wildlife including manatees, dolphins, sea turtles, many species of fish, and birds.

== Communities ==
The city of Vero Beach lies on both sides of the Indian River, with its main business and residential areas on the mainland. Two of the island's four bridges from the mainland lie within the city limits. Other communities on the island include the towns of Indian River Shores and Orchid, and the census-designated places of South Beach, Wabasso Beach and Windsor.

== Parks and protected areas ==
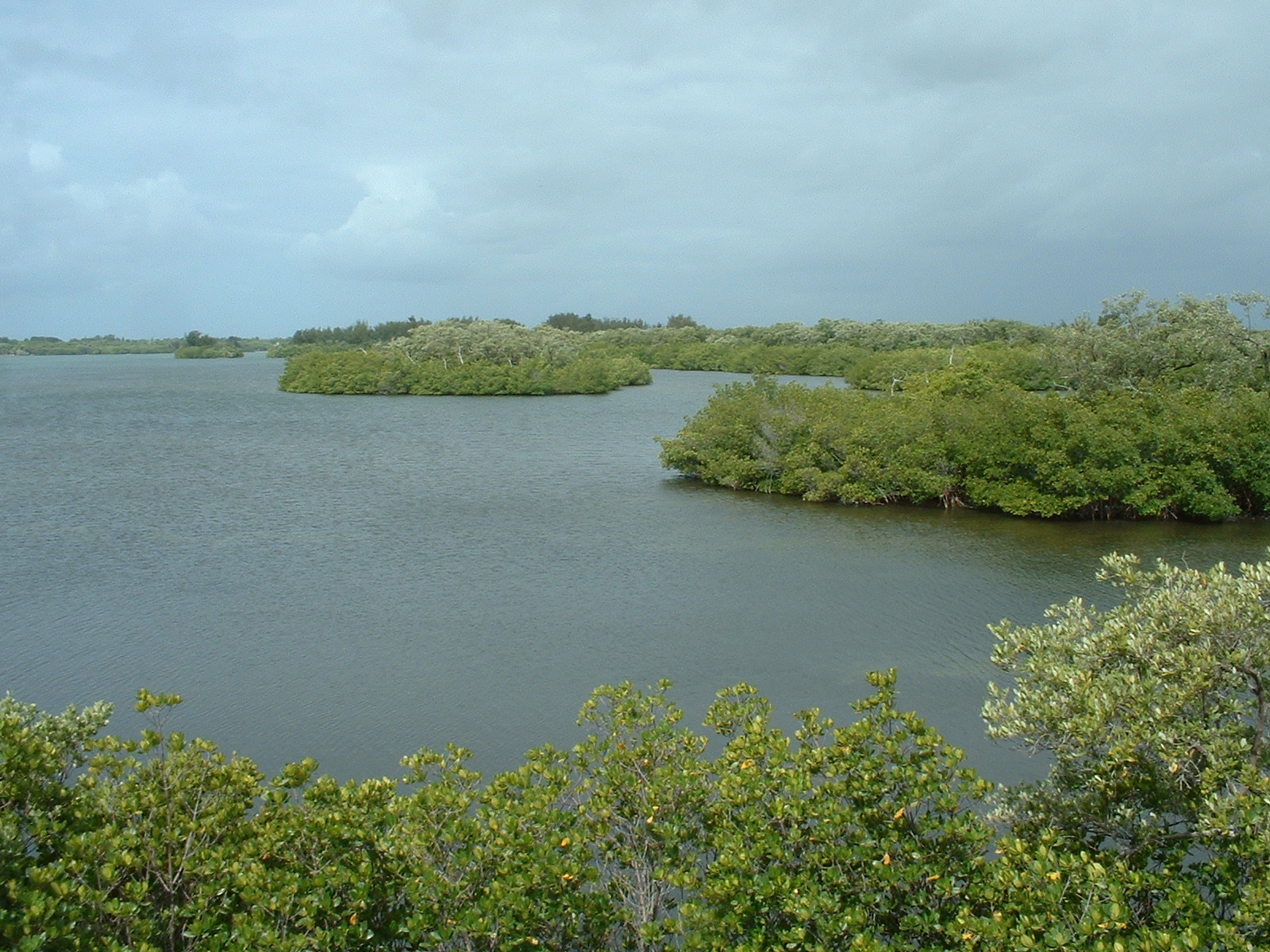
Indian River shoreline at Sebastian Inlet State Park

- Avalon State Park, 4 miles (6.4 km) north of Fort Pierce Inlet State Park.
- Fort Pierce Inlet State Park
- Sebastian Inlet State Park is located at the north end of Orchid Island and extends across the Sebastian Inlet into Brevard County.
- Jack Island State Preserve, on the west side of A-1-A, north of Pepper Park Beachside.
- Archie Carr National Wildlife Refuge, on the northern end of the island. The refuge was established for the protection of sea turtles.
- Pelican Island National Wildlife Refuge is located in the Indian River Lagoon north of Windsor.
- Pepper Park Beachside, is a St. Lucie County park on the southern end of North Hutchinson Island along A-1-A. It has fishing piers and public beach access with picnic facilities.
- Riverside Park is an Indian River County park located at the foot of the Merrill Barber Bridge on the island side. This location hosts the Vero Beach Art Museum, the Riverside Theatre and the Riverside Children's Theatre.
- Round Island Park is an Indian River County park that abuts the county line on the south and runs from the ocean to the river.

== Sites of interest ==
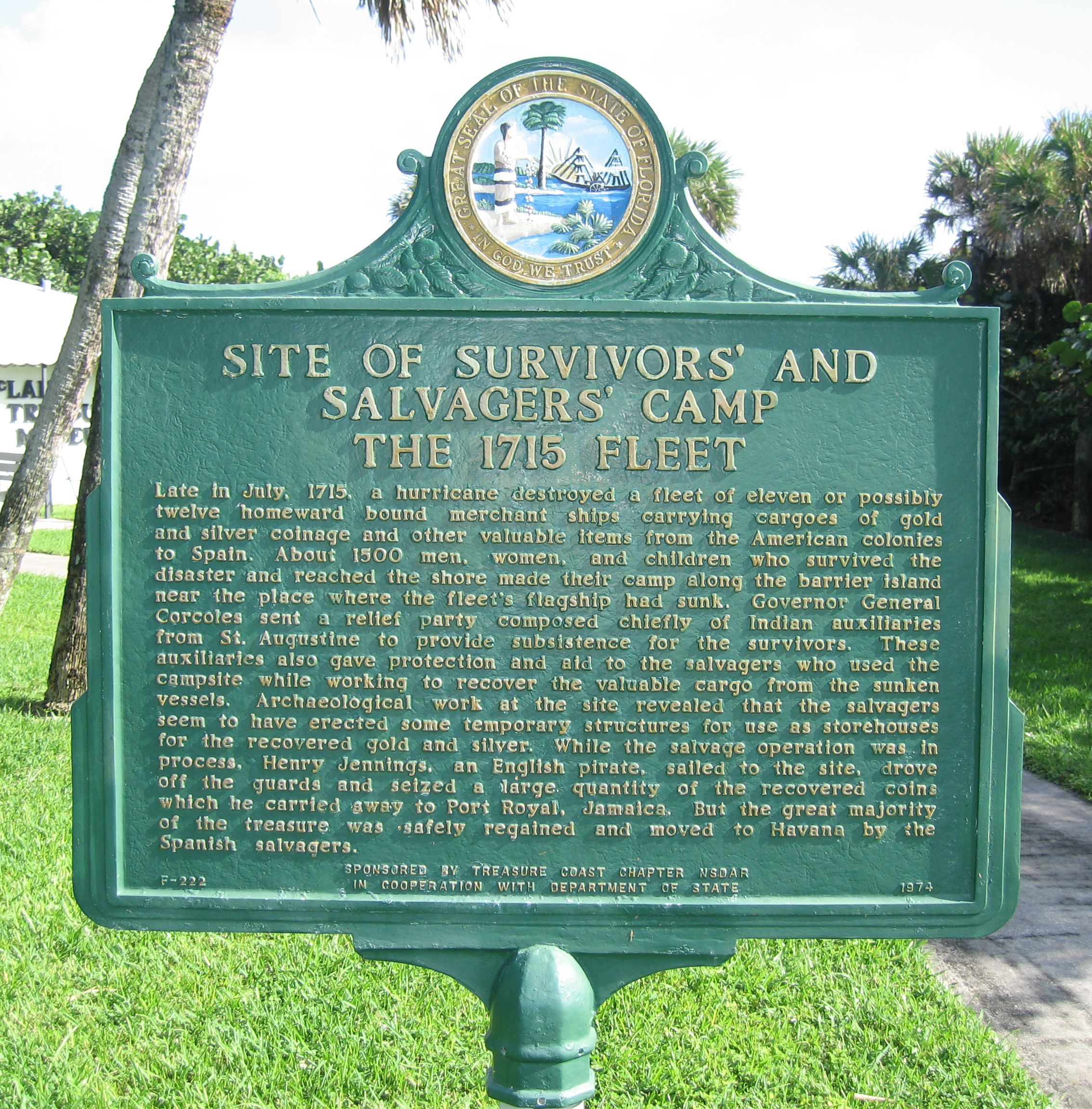
"Survivors' and Salvagers' Camp - 1715 Fleet" - historic marker near 13180 North A1A on Orchid Island

Sites of interest on/near North Hutchinson Island include:

- In Sebastian Inlet State Park:
  - McLarty Treasure Museum
  - Site of camp used by survivors and salvagers of the wrecks of the 1715 Spanish Treasure Fleet.
  - Sebastian Fishing Museum
- National Navy UDT-SEAL Museum, on the east side of A-1-A just south of Pepper Park Beachside. (3300 N A1A)
- The Driftwood Inn and Waldo's Restaurant, listed on the National Register of Historic Places, at Sexton Park on the Atlantic Ocean.
- Disney's Vero Beach Resort, in Wabasso Beach.
