= Windsor, Indian River County, Florida =

Windsor, Florida
- Census-designated place
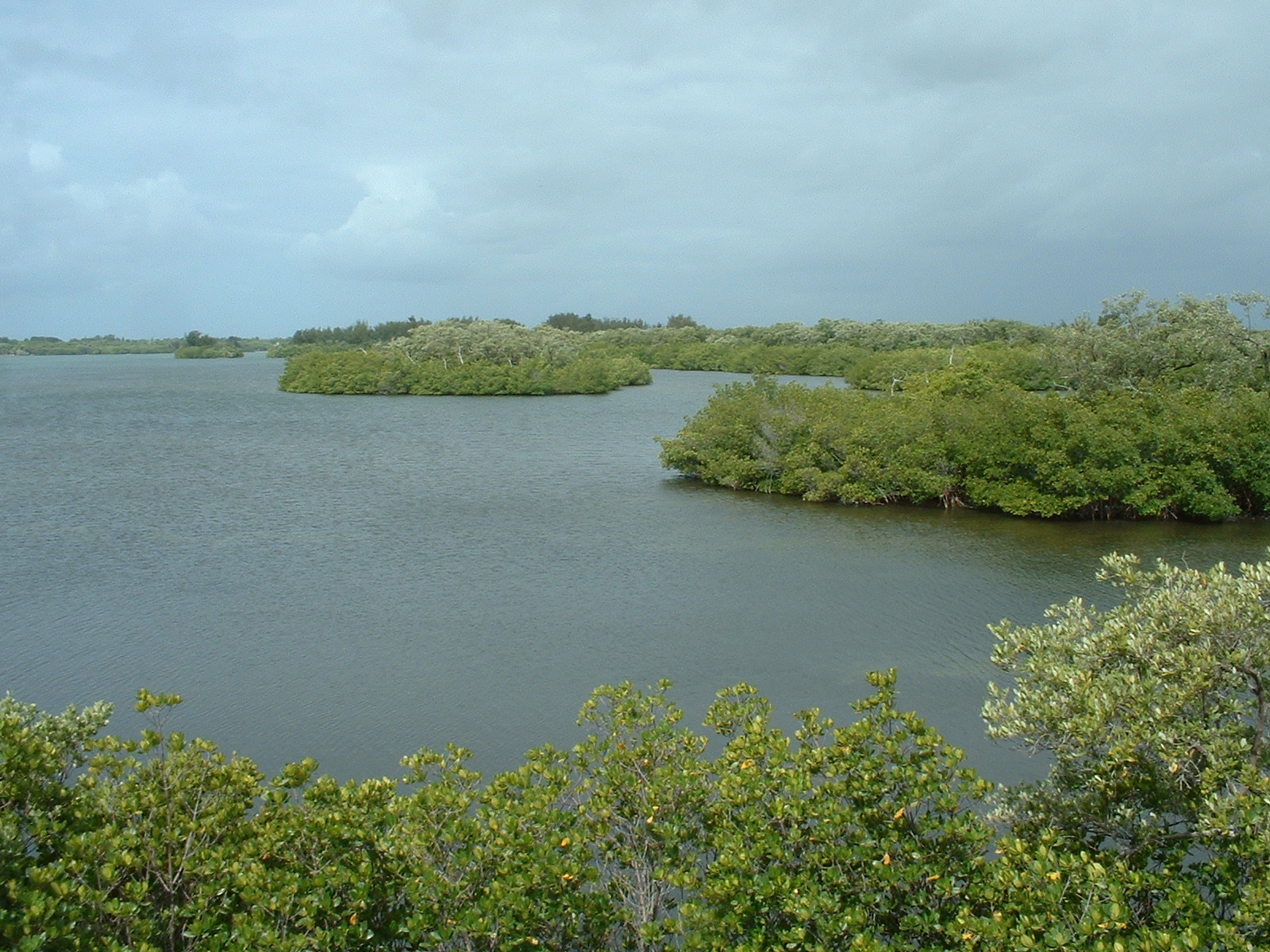
- Indian River shoreline at Sebastian Inlet State Park

- Location in Indian River County and the state of Florida
- Coordinates: 27°47′12″N 80°24′50″W
- Country: United States
- State: Florida
- County: Indian River

Area
  - Total: 0.87 sq mi (2.26 km^{2})
  - Land: 0.87 sq mi (2.26 km^{2})
  - Water: 0 sq mi (0.00 km^{2})
- Elevation: 7 ft (2.1 m)

Population (2020)
  - Total: 330
  - Density: 377.5/sq mi (145.76/km^{2})
- Time zone: UTC-5 (Eastern (EST))
  - Summer (DST): UTC-4 (EDT)
- FIPS code: 12-78110
- GNIS feature ID: 2628540
- Website: www.windsorflorida.com

Windsor, formerly known as North Beach, is a gated community and census-designated place (CDP) on North Hutchinson Island in Indian River County, Florida, United States. The population was 256 at the 2010 census. It is part of the Sebastian–Vero Beach Metropolitan Statistical Area.

== Geography ==
Windsor is located in northeastern Indian River County, and is bordered to the south by the town of Orchid, to the north by Pelican Island National Wildlife Refuge, to the west by the Indian River Lagoon, and to the east by the Atlantic Ocean. Florida State Road A1A runs along the eastern side of the community, leading north 22 miles (35 km) to Melbourne Beach and south 10 miles (16 km) to Vero Beach.

According to the United States Census Bureau, the CDP has a total area of 0.89 square miles (2.3 km^{2}), all of it recorded as land.

== Demographics ==
Historical population
| Census | Pop. | Note | %± |
|---|---|---|---|
| 2000 | 243 | | — |
| 2010 | 256 | | 5.3% |
| 2020 | 330 | | 28.9% |
U.S. Decennial Census

A community named North Beach was listed as a census designated place in the 2000 U.S. census; it was deleted for the 2010 U.S. census and a new CDP under the name Windsor was formed from part of its area.

=== Racial and ethnic composition ===
Windsor CDP, Florida – Racial and ethnic composition Note: the US Census treats Hispanic/Latino as an ethnic category. This table excludes Latinos from the racial categories and assigns them to a separate category. Hispanics/Latinos may be of any race.
| Race / Ethnicity (NH = Non-Hispanic) | Pop 2000 | Pop 2010 | Pop 2020 | % 2000 | % 2010 | % 2020 |
|---|---|---|---|---|---|---|
| White alone (NH) | 234 | 245 | 299 | 96.30% | 95.70% | 90.61% |
| Black or African American alone (NH) | 1 | 0 | 0 | 0.41% | 0.00% | 0.00% |
| Native American or Alaska Native alone (NH) | 0 | 2 | 1 | 0.00% | 0.78% | 0.30% |
| Asian alone (NH) | 0 | 1 | 3 | 0.00% | 0.39% | 0.91% |
| Native Hawaiian or Pacific Islander alone (NH) | 0 | 0 | 0 | 0.00% | 0.00% | 0.00% |
| Other race alone (NH) | 0 | 0 | 0 | 0.00% | 0.00% | 0.00% |
| Mixed race or Multiracial (NH) | 3 | 2 | 13 | 1.23% | 0.78% | 3.94% |
| Hispanic or Latino (any race) | 5 | 6 | 14 | 2.06% | 2.34% | 4.24% |
| Total | 243 | 256 | 330 | 100.00% | 100.00% | 100.00% |

=== 2000 census ===
As of the census of 2000, when the CDP was known as "North Beach", there were 243 people, 93 households, and 86 families residing in the CDP. The population density was 78.7 inhabitants per square mile (30.4/km^{2}). There were 199 housing units at an average density of 64.4 per square mile (24.9/km^{2}). The racial makeup of the CDP was 98.35% White, 0.41% African American, and 1.23% from two or more races. Hispanic or Latino of any race were 2.06% of the population.

There were 93 households, out of which 32.3% had children under the age of 18 living with them, 84.9% were married couples living together, 7.5% had a female householder with no husband present, and 6.5% were non-families. 6.5% of all households were made up of individuals, and 2.2% had someone living alone who was 65 years of age or older. The average household size was 2.61 and the average family size was 2.66.

In the CDP, the population was spread out, with 23.0% under the age of 18, 1.2% from 18 to 24, 16.9% from 25 to 44, 38.7% from 45 to 64, and 20.2% who were 65 years of age or older. The median age was 50 years. For every 100 females, there were 104.2 males. For every 100 females age 18 and over, there were 94.8 males.

The median income for a household in the CDP was $70,417, and the median income for a family was $70,417. Males had a median income of $43,750 versus $0 for females. The per capita income for the CDP was $79,269. None of the population or families were below the poverty line.

== Places of interest ==
- McLarty Treasure Museum
- Pelican Island National Wildlife Refuge
- Sebastian Inlet State Park
