= Sebastian Inlet =

12 miles north of Vero Beach, Florida, US

Coordinates: 27°51′37″N 80°26′50″W

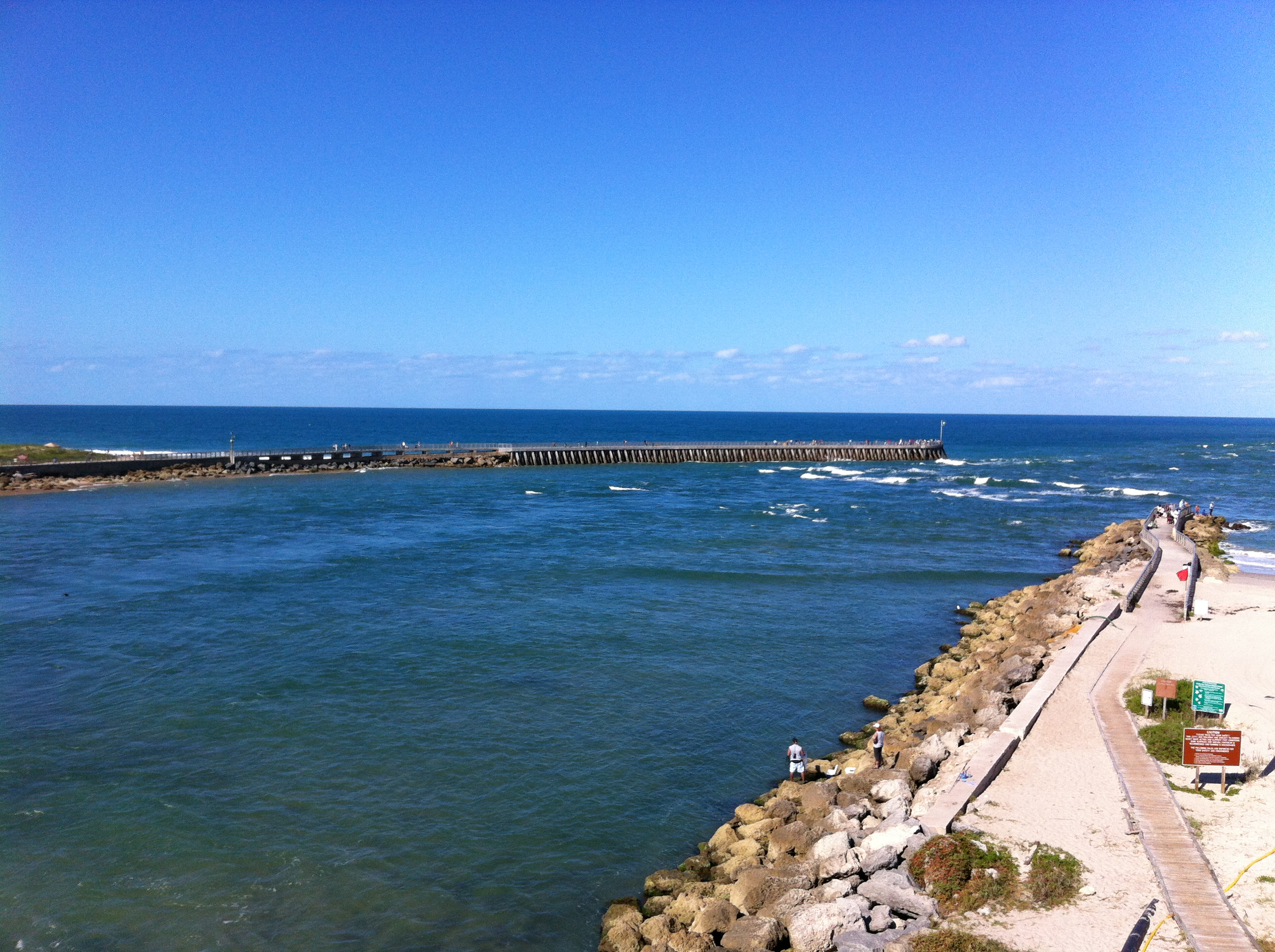
Mouth of the Sebastian Inlet showing the North Jetty on the left and the South Jetty on the right.

Sebastian Inlet, located in Sebastian Inlet State Park in Brevard County, Florida and Indian River County, Florida, offers surfing and fishing opportunities. It is off State Road A1A just 12 miles north of Vero Beach. There are annual surf tournaments, professional and amateur. Visitors fish there, particularly for Snook and Redfish.

== Government ==
The Inlet is managed by the Sebastian Inlet District with a commission popularly elected by voters from the surrounding area. Candidates run non-partisan. Their annual salary is $3,600. Commissioners include:

- District 1, Brevard County - T J Marshall (term ends 2028)
- District 2, Indian River County - John Campbell (term ends 2028)
- District 3, Brevard County - Michael Rowland (term ends 2028)
- District 4, Indian River County - David Barney (term ends 2026)
- District 5, Brevard County - Lisa Frazier (term ends 2026)

== History ==
The 1715 Spanish Treasure Fleet wrecked in this area. The site where the survivors camped was added to the U.S. National Register of Historic Places on August 12, 1970, under the title of Spanish Fleet Survivors and Salvors Camp Site. Today, the McLarty Treasure Museum (a part of the park) exhibits artifacts relating to the wreck.

The first attempt by settlers to open an inlet at Sebastian took place in 1872. It was orchestrated by David Peter Gibson. Although Gibson first dug a cut at Sebastian in 1872 he did not acquire title to the property where the digging took place until May, 1885. Gibson's Cut, as his inlet was known then, appears as a feature in a United States Coast and Geodetic Survey map drawn in the winter of 1880-81. Mention of Gibson's Cut appears in James Henshall's 1881 tale "Cruise of the Rambler" when he relates how "Sailing out of St. Sebastian River into Indian River, a break in the coastline opposite can be seen, which is the beginning of an attempt by settlers in the vicinity to cut an inlet to the sea." Since Henshall was only passing through there was no way he could know that the "break in the coast line" he saw wasn't the "beginning" but the result of the effort to dig the cut from nearly a decade earlier.

In the July 28, 1886, edition of the Florida Star, letter writer G. W. Idner reports that talk was once again circulating about re-opening Gibson's Cut. Idner names some of those who worked on the first cut as "The Gibson and Houston boys ... and also Charley Creech and several others." Idner was an early settler of Tillman, now Palm Bay. He was also involved with Gibson's first efforts to open a cut. Discussion about opening Gibson's Cut in 1886 never amounted to anything more than just talk although a commonly held misconception has been that this was the year it was first dug.

When faced with foreclosure on the barrier island property that held his cut, he transferred title to his son, Quinn, but lost the property anyway.

At the time of D. P. Gibson's first effort the barrier island was about 260 feet (79 m) wide at the cut site. It widened considerably over the years as efforts to open an inlet continued.

During the summer of 1891 the second attempt to open an Inlet at Sebastian took place. By that time the barrier island had grown to be 450 feet (140 m) wide at the cut site. This would indicate that several other efforts had been mounted since 1872 although no records of these attempts have yet been found. Some of the folks involved with the 1891 effort were "Nesbitt...Harris and Williamson [of] Micco [along with] Knight, Gibson, Eason, Jacobs and Mitchell" all of Sebastian. They formed the St. Sebastian Inlet Association but they never succeeded in opening the inlet although they spent considerable money and time on the project.

An 1892 article read as follows: "Col. D. P. Gibson, the pioneer settler in this section, says he will cut an inlet through to the Atlantic, and as the distance is only about 120 yards, it will only take a short time to make this very valuable improvement, and it is the general opinion that Col. Gibson will make a success of it." There is no indication that any work actually went on at the cut site that year, or for the next five years for that matter.

In 1897 some winter residents of Brevard county made the third effort to open the inlet. It was the most ambitious so far. In that year The Roseland Inlet Corporation was formed to open an inlet to the sea at Gibson's Cut. The Corporation's Board of Directors included Alice P. Hudson, William W. Bissell, Henri J. Van Zelm, Harry Todd and Thomas S. Drake all of New Rochelle, New York. Bissell was a wealthy banker and all of the others were well-to-do friends and associates of his. Thomas S. Drake was a descendant of Sir Francis Drake. Harry Todd's father was James W. Todd who was a member of the Board of Directors at Bissell's bank. He purchased the entire Fleming Grant in 1892 for $5,050 ($181000 in 2025 dollars) when it was sold at a Sheriff's sale for taxes owed. There were 20,000 acres (8,100 ha). He paid 25 cents an acre($9 in 2025 dollars).

Todd broke the Fleming Grant up and sold tracts to his New Rochelle business acquaintances who then formed the Roseland Inlet Association. They saw the Inlet as an essential fixture for the drainage of their swampland and a convenient access to the Atlantic for their sailboats. Although the Roseland Inlet Corporation dug a partial cut across the island it was never completed.

The fourth attempt at opening Gibson's Cut began in 1899. Called "The Sebastian Inlet Association," it was organized at Eau Gallie, April 20, of that year "for the purpose of raising funds to cut a canal from Indian River to the ocean at Gibson's cut, opposite the Sebastian River," Although several thousand dollars were spent and work went on at the inlet well into 1900 this group's efforts to open the Sebastian Inlet met with failure.

The fifth effort to open the inlet took place in 1901. A newspaper article read: "Another attempt is to be made to open the inlet at Gibson's cut." By Early October there had been enough rainfall to cause high water levels in the lagoon. High water in the lagoon was considered essential for opening the Inlet. Some locals went to work on the cut with shovels an explosive charge in an effort to try and open it.

By the start of the 20th century water quality in the entire Lagoon north of the narrows was diminishing. Algae blooms were killing the fish and the oysters population was disappearing.

History hasn't recorded exactly who was behind the sixth effort to open an inlet to the sea at Sebastian. A newspaper report mentions a dredge and a completion date prior to October 13, 1905.

In the same issue another article declared "The people in the vicinity of Sebastian succeeded yesterday in opening an inlet to the ocean, through the narrow peninsular opposite the mouth of the Sebastian river. Between 40 and 100 men have been engaged in the work all the week. The value of this inlet to the ocean to the people from the Narrows to Eau Gallie cannot be estimated in dollars and cents."

The following week's paper stated that "Water continues to run from the river to the ocean through the new inlet. There was apprehension that it would "cave" faster than the sand would be carried out." Their fear was well founded as the high sand banks at the cut site continually washed down into it. It wasn't long before the Inlet again filled with sand.

By 1909 population increases and numerous drainage projects had further degraded the Lagoon's water quality. Many residents saw the inlet as an answer to allow clean seawater in to flush out the filth. To accomplish this, funds were raised. The nearby success of Fort Pierce dredging encouraged the supporters. But it failed to raise sufficient support.

By 1914 the lagoon system was nearly a dead body of water. Some circulated a petition among their neighbors in the spring of 1914 asking for an appropriation of $1,200 to open the inlet. Over 100 names were gathered on the petition and a delegation of over 40 individuals from the South end of the county then presented it to the Brevard County Commissioner's at their April 1914 meeting. Among the delegation of 40 who spoke in favor of the Inlet were Roy Couch and Edson B. Arnold. It is likely that both of these men were instrumental in putting the petition drive together. The County Commissioners promised to "...give it their united attention, and look up the law on the matter...."

Memories of all the previous expensive failures were still too fresh. Some felt that there was a greater need for good roads than there was for an inlet which would "only benefit the fish business."

Hopes for an inlet were raised in 1914 when it became known that "Congressman L'Engle introduced a bill appropriating $5,000 to make a survey of several places including Sebastian, to open an inlet to aid the fishing industry. This reinforced the impression that inlet would benefit a select group while costing uninterested taxpayers money.

A lack of funds and essential permits required by the federal government prevented any actual work on the inlet from taking place during 1914.

By 1915 the Sebastian Inlet issue was a topic on which many county residents had developed an opinion. Residents in the northern portion of Brevard county were largely opposed. To dispose of their resistance some residents from the south Brevard tried to again split the county in thirds. These plans were submitted to the state legislature by some Brevardians who made an appearance at the capitol with petitions and maps detailing the split. Their plan saw Brevard carved into three counties which would have been named - from north to south - Brevard, Hudson and Indian River. Titusville would have remained Brevard's county seat, Cocoa would have become the county seat for Hudson county, named in honor of the senator who was to sponsor the bill, and Melbourne was to be the county seat of Indian River county. This did not happen.

The United States Army Corps of Engineers objected to the idea of the Sebastian Inlet for several reasons. The chosen location presented the distinct possibility that once the cut was opened it would cause sand shoals to form in the Indian river and block the East Coast Canal. The Corps was obliged to maintain the East Coast Canal at that time and didn't want the extra expense of dredging out new shoals. Additionally they disagreed with the idea that the inlet would be dug, as had the East Coast Canal, using private funds which they viewed as a precursor to failure. The Corps insisted that for them to approve such a plan a local tax district would have to be created to raise funds for the inlet's maintenance so that federal tax money wouldn't be needed.

Mainly because of the lack of a tax district the Corps continued to deny Inlet supporters their needed War Department permit all through 1915. The Inlet's supporters wouldn't take a "no" from the Army Corps and persisted with their efforts to be granted a permit to dig the Sebastian Inlet. They repeatedly petitioned the government and were granted several public hearings to discuss the inlet issue at greater length during that year.

Perhaps hoping to help persuade the Corps to grant a permit for digging to begin, Jessie Goode volunteered to grant an easement across her barrier island property for the new cut. If her offer had been accepted the inlet would have been called "The Goode Sebastian Inlet" in honor of her late husband.

Two things important to the Sebastian Inlet plans occurred in 1916. The Corps agreed to grant a permit for a private consortium to proceed with work on the Inlet if they could post a $20,000 indemnity bond to cover the cost of the Corps repairing the East Coast Canal should the Inlet cause shoals to form and a wealthy physician, Dr. Hughlett, from Cocoa was elected to the state senate. Hughlett had been a friend of Couch's for some years and Couch knew his election meant that an ear sympathetic to the need for the Sebastian Inlet was in Tallahassee.

Several important events occurred in 1917 that concerned the Sebastian Inlet. One of these events was when Mrs. C. H. Holderman started another newspaper in Brevard county after selling the one she had published in Manatee county for some years. On March 22 the first edition of her new publication, the "Cocoa Tribune" hit the streets. Holderman was 1 of only 3 women in Florida who edited a newspaper at that time. She was an outspoken advocate of women's suffrage and unafraid of taking a stand on other controversial subjects as well. She exhibited an unrestrained disdain for burdensome taxation and used the pages of her publication to relay her feelings on the subject to her readers. Holderman's "Cocoa Tribune" came out every Thursday. In her 3rd edition, that of April 5, 1917 a large front page article appeared that openly called for the digging of several inlets along Brevard's coastline, including one at Sebastian.

Couch's lobbying, Holderman's editorial support and that of other editors in the area led Florida's legislature to draft, and pass, the Indian River Inlet Bill during its 1917 session. Known also as the Hughlett-Rodes inlet bill it called for a special election to let the voters in Brevard County decide whether or not to go ahead and allocate tax money for continued engineering studies of the inlet's feasibility. The election was scheduled to be held on August 21, 1917.

Holderman's support for the Sebastian Inlet waned once she became aware of its dismal history. Subsequent issues of the Cocoa Tribune carried only criticism of the bill and the Inlets that would result if the bill became law. Most of the other newspaper editors in North Brevard also opposed the idea and let everyone know of their beliefs in no uncertain terms. Only one editor in the county's northern reaches, W. B. Dobson of the Cocoa Star, was very much in favor of the bill. No doubt this was because he was to become one of the three commissioners on the board should the inlet district become reality. The other two commissioners were going to be Couch and A. B. Tull.

As the August election drew close the inlet bill was a hotter, and more frequently discussed topic than was the 1st World War. Sections 6 and 7 of the bill were found particularly objectionable because they seemed to give the commissioners unlimited power to increase taxes and condemn land. When the election was held the bill lost. The majority of voters against it were in the north end of Brevard county. The bill would have succeeded had it only been up to the voters in the south end of the county.

As discouraging as this defeat must have been for Couch, it didn't keep him from continuing to push for the Sebastian Inlet. Fish were scarce and this scarcity combined with the food shortage caused by the War meant a lot of families in the Indian River area were going hungry.

On April 25, 1918, the Sebastian Inlet Association was created at a meeting held in Sebastian. Although it was a privately funded entity, its creation, and Roy's perpetual lobbying, must have been good enough for the War Department because only 2 days later it finally granted a permit to dig the Sebastian Inlet. Stipulations listed on the permit included one demanding that if any shoaling should occur in the East Coast Canal as a result of the inlet the Association would have to remove the shoals. Even so, the permit still required a $10,000 bond be posted.

The seventh effort to open an inlet at Sebastian proceeded as rapidly as possible once the long awaited permit was granted.

There were several reasons to hurry and complete the project. Not only was it felt that high water in the Indian River was essential for the Inlet to be opened, but the War Department permit expired on December 31, 1918. High water levels usually were reached in late summer or early fall, only 5 or 6 months away.

An article that appeared in the May 1, 1918 issue of the Melbourne Times named the "officers of the Sebastian Inlet Association [as]: President, R.O. Couch, Grant; Secretary, Carl Schlichtinger, St. Lucie County; and Treasurer, Allen Campbell, Roseland.

This same article declared that no public money would be used in the effort, but only a few weeks had passed before Ernest Svedelius appeared before the County Commissioners of Brevard and St. Lucie counties to request that each of these bodies contribute $1,000 toward the inlet. No funds were forthcoming from either.

Because of the lack of funds in the Associations account Couch took it upon himself to build a 6 inches (150 mm) suction dredge at his marine ways in Grant. He also hired Charles W. Sembler to dredge out the cut.

No sooner was the inlet open in 1918 than it was again filled with sand and debris. There were a number of influential citizens in the area who were steadfastly opposed to opening the Sebastian Inlet. Among them were grove owners such as A. B. Michael of Orchid. Michael was opposed to it for several reasons. One, he saw opening an inlet to the ocean as something that would forever change the fragile ecology of the Indian River Lagoon. At that time it was almost a body of fresh water. He was also concerned that the influx of salt water would ruin the fresh water wells essential for his groves. Cattlemen on the mainland nearby also shared a fear that their fresh water wells would be ruined, but the most powerful opponent to the opening was by far Henry Flagler's Florida East Coast Rail Road that feared salt water in the lagoon would mean teredoes in the pilings of their rail road trestles that crossed the areas fresh water rivers. At any rate, it wasn't but a couple of days after the Sebastian Inlet was opened that someone organized several boatloads of men from the Narrows to Ft. Pierce into an Inlet destruction crew. One evening they loaded lanterns, shovels, saws, pick-axes, dynamite and chains, maybe even a mule or two, into boats and headed to the newly opened Sebastian Inlet. There they cut cabbage palms and any other tree they could find, dragged them into the cut and placed a lot of dynamite along the banks. Once the dynamite was set off it blew sand into the inlet sufficiently to plug it up.

Couch committed another dredge to the project and work continued through the winter, even past the December 31 expiration date of the permit. Before long word of the projects continuance past the permits expiration date reached the War Department and this agency was not amused. Every one of the Sebastian Inlet Association's board members and the dredge crews found themselves threatened with arrest if the work wasn't halted promptly. With the two dredges still at work Couch and some other influential citizens set out for Washington, D.C. where they approached Senator Duncan U. Fletcher and lobbied him to work on the War Department and obtain another permit.

After returning from Washington, Couch secured the able assistance of Capt. Robert Hardee and Frank Vickers and all three went to Tallahassee to push through a bill that was essentially identical to the failed Indian River Inlet Bill of the previous year. The biggest difference in the two was in the land area to be encompassed by the tax district. Because north Brevard county had defeated the previous bill it was left out and the districts boundaries encompassed only those precincts in Brevard and St. Lucie counties that had voted for the Indian River Inlet Bill. Couch, Hardee and Vickers stayed in Tallahassee until the bill was signed by Governor Catts.

The Sebastian Inlet Tax District came into being in 1919 after the new bill had been approved in an election and on August 31, 1920 this new agency was granted a permit to dig which would remain valid until December 31, 1923.

The Tax District's first $100,000 bond issue was delayed by court injunctions brought by some wealthy property owners and the F.E.C. but not even that delay stopped work on the inlet. Within several years the bond issue was approved, the inlet was opened sometime in June 1923 and several months later the Sebastian Inlet Tax District obtained permission from the land owner (Milton Hardee) to dig the inlet. It has been a continual struggle of man against the elements ever since just to keep the inlet open.

In 1924, jetties made of coquina rock were completed. They only lasted until the first big storm though when big waves rolled almost all the rocks away. Eventually granite, a much denser rock than coquina, was used and the jetties became a permanent fixture.

Sebastian Inlet's first public telephone booth was installed in 1961. Until that point, reporting an emergency on the beach required knocking on private homes and asking to use their telephone.

In 2010, unwanted lionfish were found to have invaded local waters. They are a threat to native species.

== See also ==
- Sebastian, Florida
- Sebastian Inlet Bridge
