= Avalon State Park =

State park in St. Lucie County, Florida

- IUCN category IV (habitat/species management area)
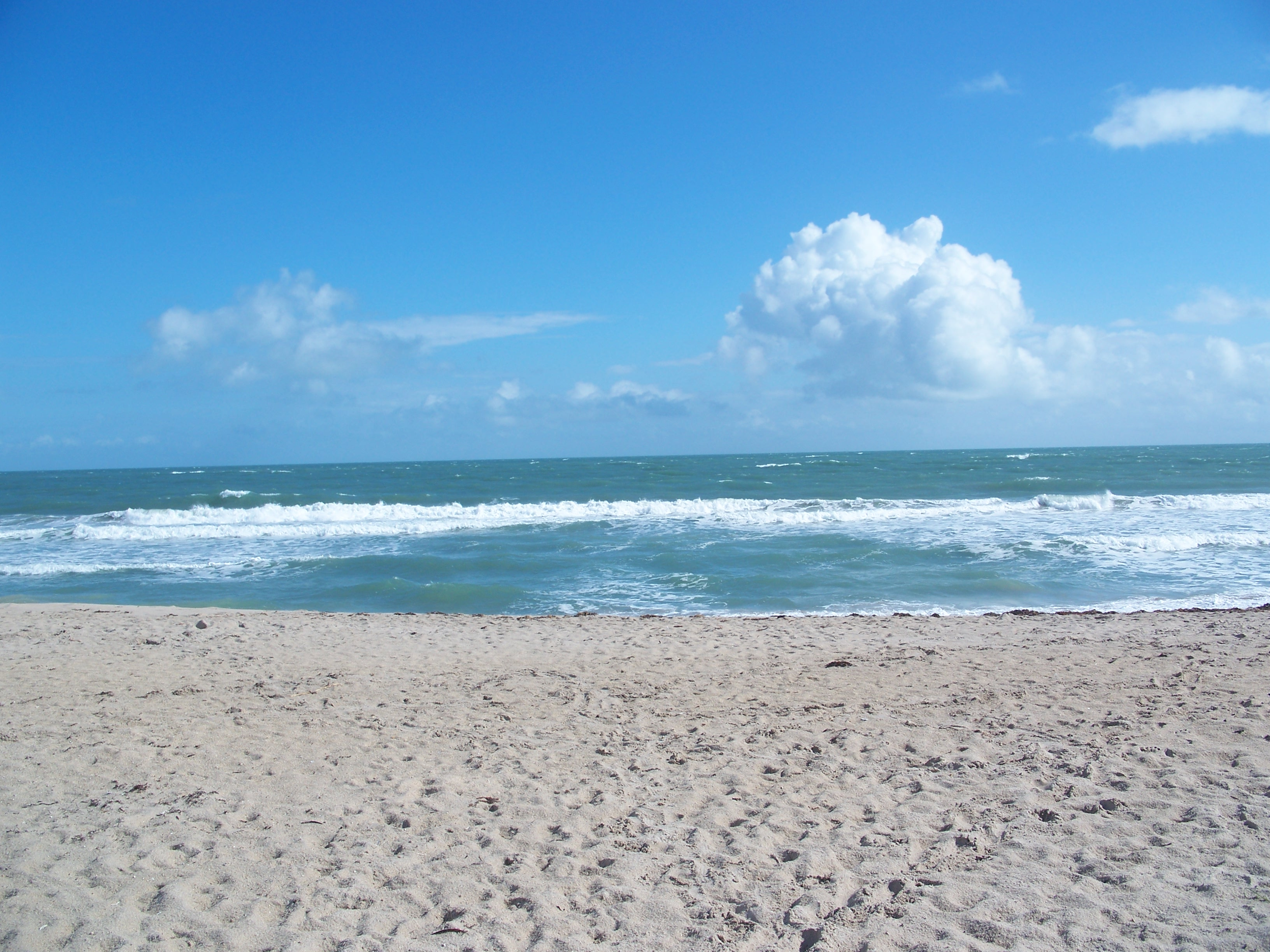
- View of the Atlantic Ocean

- Location within Florida Location within the United States
- Interactive map of Avalon State Park
- Location: St. Lucie County, Florida, USA
- Nearest city: St. Lucie Village, Florida
- Coordinates: 27°33′6″N 80°19′14″W
- Governing body: Florida Department of Environmental Protection

Avalon State Park is a Florida State Park, located on North Hutchinson Island, 4 miles north of Fort Pierce Inlet State Park, along A1A.

== Admission and hours ==
Florida state parks are open between 8 a.m. and sundown every day of the year (including holidays).

== Gallery ==
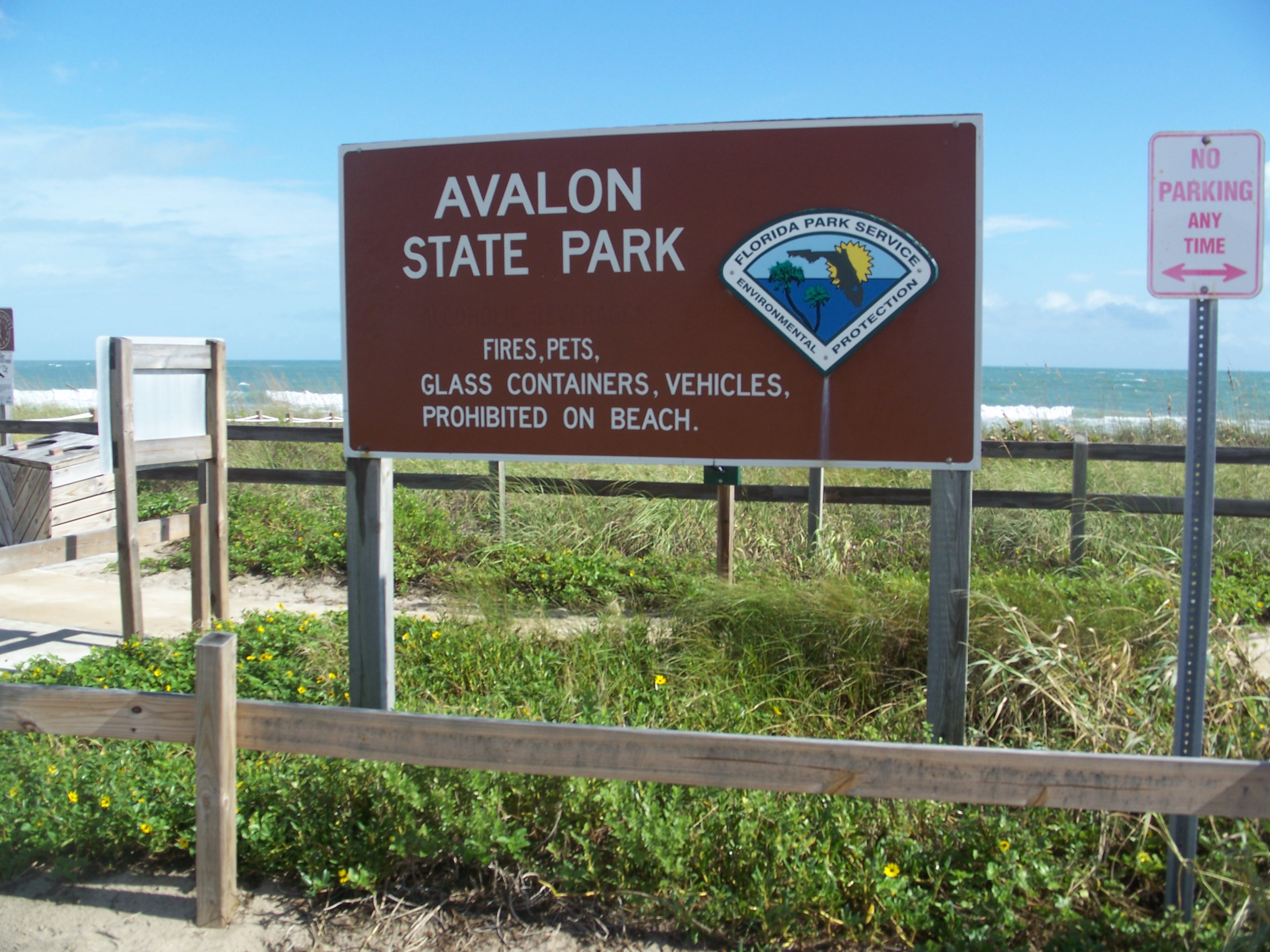
Sign

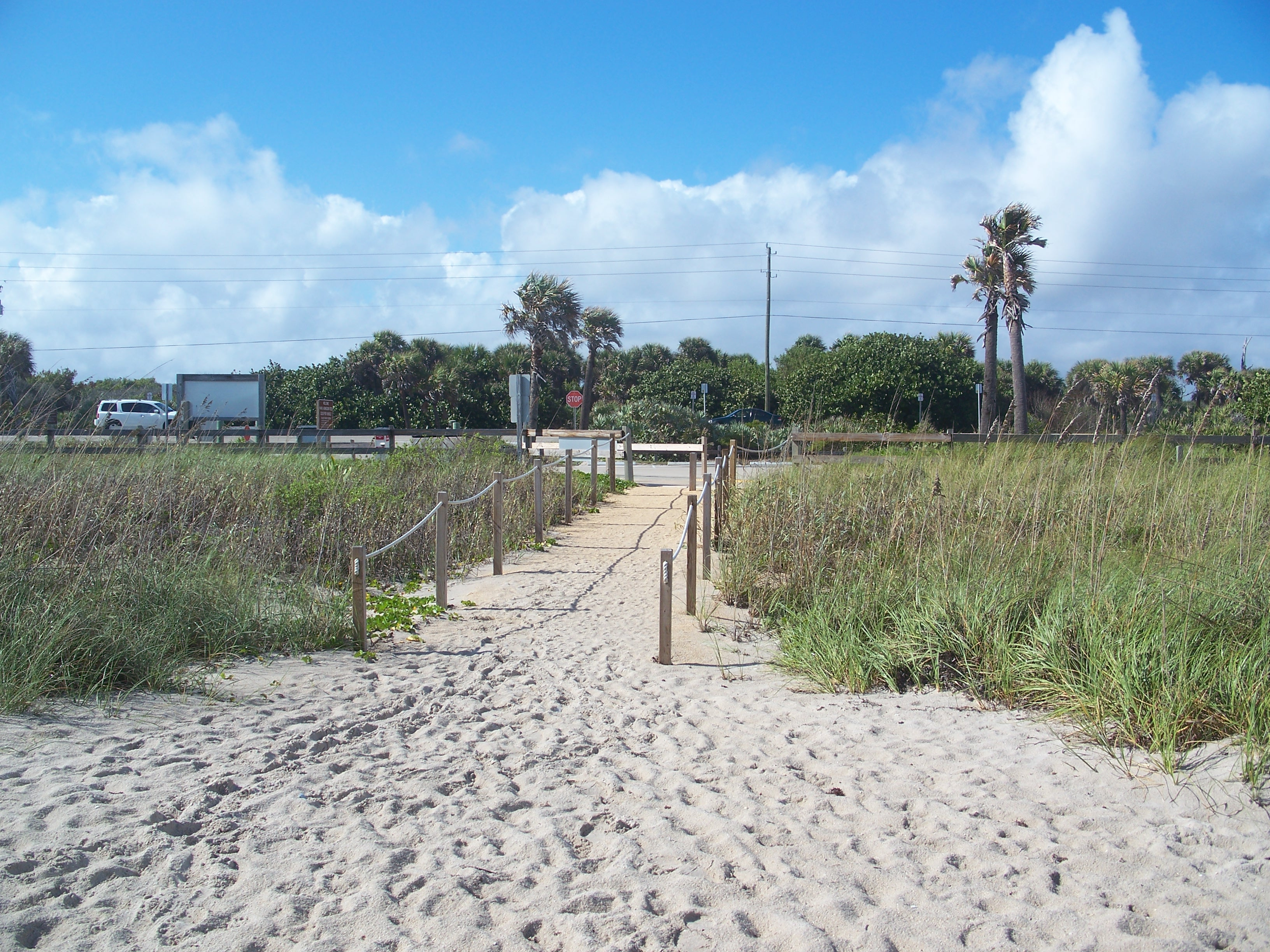
Path over dune
