= Sebastian Fishing Museum =

Fishing museum in Melbourne Beach, Florida

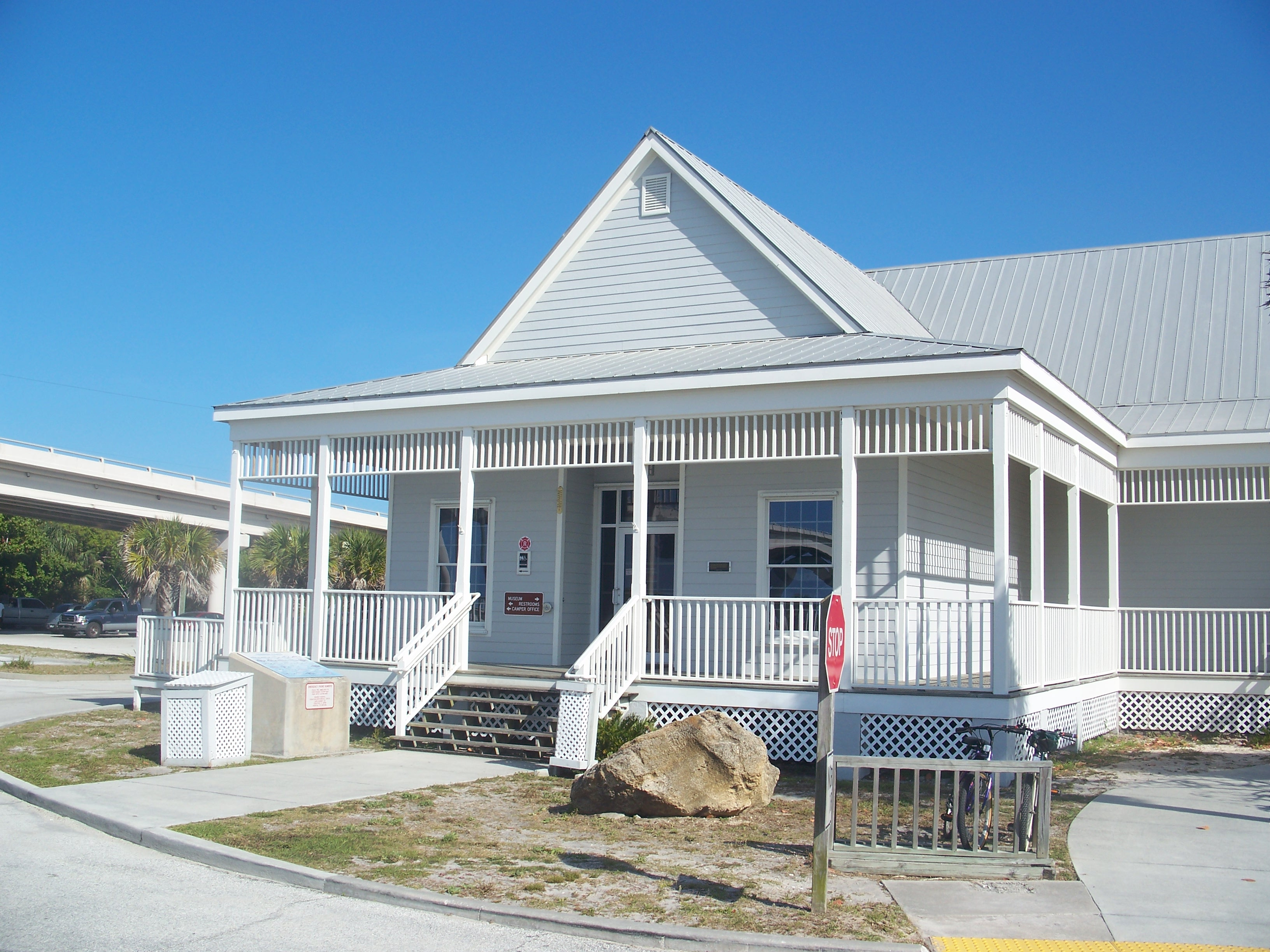

- Location within Florida
- Established: 1998
- Location: Sebastian Inlet State Recreation Area; 9700 South Highway A1A; Melbourne Beach, Florida
- Coordinates: 27.858691°N 80.448225°W
- Type: Local History
- Website: Sebastion Fishing Museum

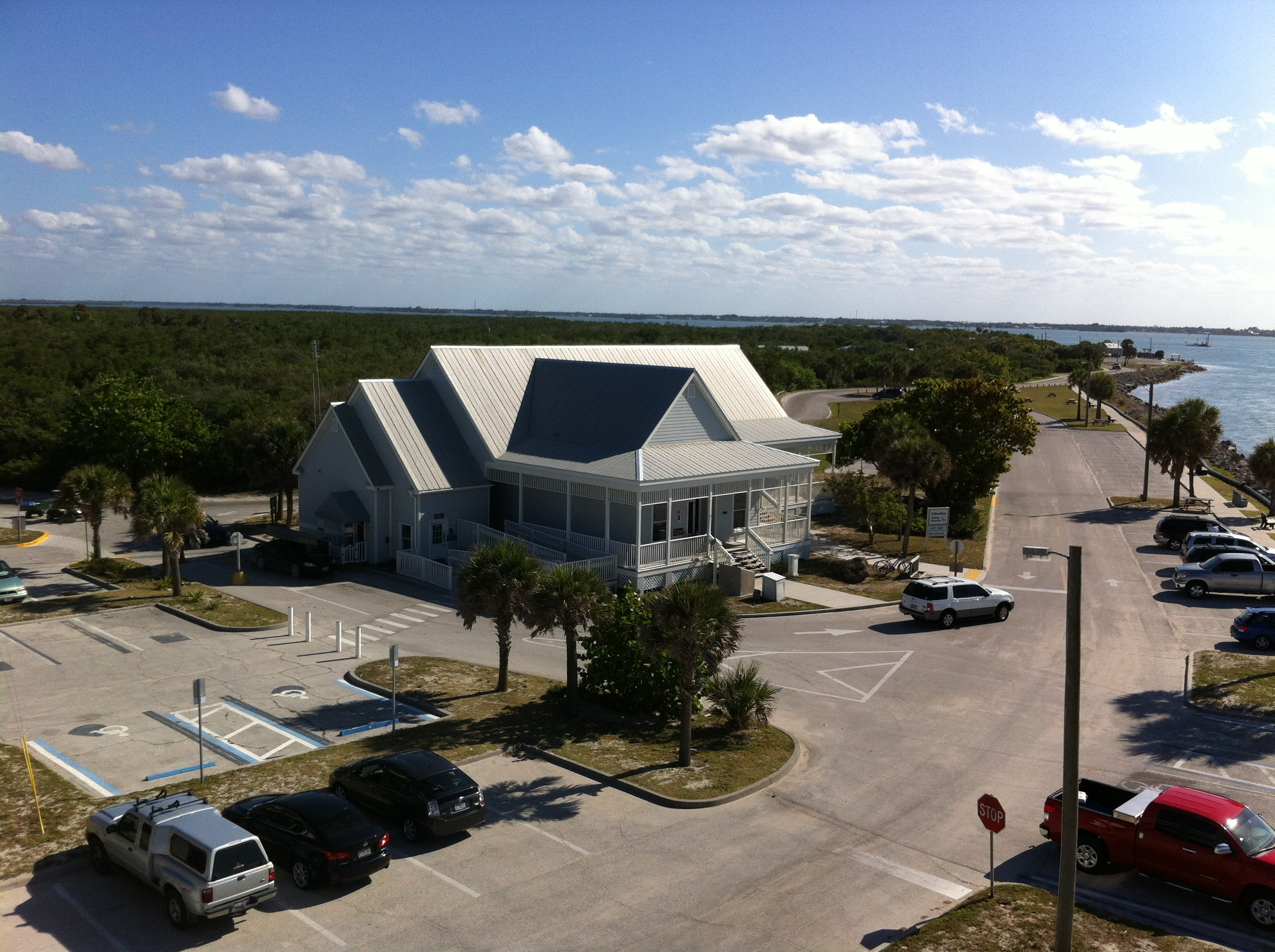
Sebastian Fishing Museum

The Sebastian Fishing Museum is located in Sebastian Inlet State Park at the Sebastian Inlet State Recreation Area, 9700 South Highway A1A, Melbourne Beach, Florida, although it is physically located on Orchid Island, Indian River County side of the park. It houses historical exhibits of the local fishing industry and its influence on the area.

It contains equipment used in commercial fishing and a replica of a vintage fishing house and dock. The museum also displays the history of three local families involved in the fishing industry during its formative years in Sebastian.
