= South Beach, Florida =

- Census-designated place
- Location in Indian River County and the state of Florida
- Coordinates: 27°36′24″N 80°21′17″W
- Country: United States
- State: Florida
- County: Indian River

Area
  - Total: 6.87 sq mi (17.79 km^{2})
  - Land: 2.72 sq mi (7.04 km^{2})
  - Water: 4.15 sq mi (10.75 km^{2})
- Elevation: 10 ft (3.0 m)

Population (2020)
  - Total: 3,703
  - Density: 1,362.0/sq mi (525.86/km^{2})
- Time zone: UTC-5 (Eastern (EST))
  - Summer (DST): UTC-4 (EDT)
- ZIP code: 32963
- Area code: 772
- FIPS code: 12-67192
- GNIS feature ID: 2402867

South Beach is a census-designated place (CDP) on North Hutchinson Island in Indian River County, Florida, United States. As of the 2020 census, South Beach had a population of 3,703. It is ranked tenth in Florida locations by per capita income as of 2010.

South Beach is part of the Sebastian–Vero Beach Metropolitan Statistical Area.

== Geography ==
South Beach is located in southeastern Indian River County on Orchid Island. It is bounded on the east by the Atlantic Ocean, on the south by the border between Indian River and St Lucie counties, on the west by the Indian River Lagoon, and on the north by the Vero Beach city limits.

According to the United States Census Bureau, the CDP has a total area of 6.8 square miles (17.7 km^{2}), of which 2.7 square miles (7.0 km^{2}) are land and 4.1 square miles (10.7 km^{2}), or 60.31%, are water.

== Demographics ==
Historical population
Census	Pop.	Note	%±
2020	3,703		—
U.S. Decennial Census

=== 2020 census ===
As of the 2020 census, South Beach had a population of 3,703. The median age was 64.9 years. 11.2% of residents were under the age of 18 and 49.7% of residents were 65 years of age or older. For every 100 females there were 90.0 males, and for every 100 females age 18 and over there were 90.3 males age 18 and over.

100.0% of residents lived in urban areas, while 0.0% lived in rural areas.

There were 1,749 households in South Beach, of which 13.9% had children under the age of 18 living in them. Of all households, 66.1% were married-couple households, 9.8% were households with a male householder and no spouse or partner present, and 20.3% were households with a female householder and no spouse or partner present. About 23.9% of all households were made up of individuals and 18.0% had someone living alone who was 65 years of age or older.

There were 2,346 housing units, of which 25.4% were vacant. The homeowner vacancy rate was 2.1% and the rental vacancy rate was 15.6%.

Racial composition as of the 2020 census
Race	Number	Percent
White	3,471	93.7%
Black or African American	6	0.2%
American Indian and Alaska Native	6	0.2%
Asian	29	0.8%
Native Hawaiian and Other Pacific Islander	0	0.0%
Some other race	31	0.8%
Two or more races	160	4.3%
Hispanic or Latino (of any race)	168	4.5%

=== 2000 census ===
As of the 2000 census, there were 3,457 people, 1,610 households, and 1,220 families residing in the CDP. The population density was 1,279.8 inhabitants per square mile (494.1/km^{2}). There were 2,066 housing units at an average density of 764.9 per square mile (295.3/km^{2}). The racial makeup of the CDP was 98.15% White, 0.58% African American, 0.09% Native American, 1.01% Asian, 0.06% from other races, and 0.12% from two or more races. Hispanic or Latino of any race were 1.36% of the population.

There were 1,610 households, out of which 15.1% had children under the age of 18 living with them, 72.7% were married couples living together, 2.4% had a female householder with no husband present, and 24.2% were non-families. 21.5% of all households were made up of individuals, and 15.9% had someone living alone who was 65 years of age or older. The average household size was 2.14 and the average family size was 2.45.

In the CDP, the population was spread out, with 13.7% under the age of 18, 1.4% from 18 to 24, 11.3% from 25 to 44, 30.3% from 45 to 64, and 43.2% who were 65 years of age or older. The median age was 61 years. For every 100 females, there were 93.2 males. For every 100 females age 18 and over, there were 91.6 males.

The median income for a household in the CDP was $108,702, and the median income for a family was $126,755. Males had a median income of $89,395 versus $26,607 for females. The per capita income for the CDP was $90,938. About 1.4% of families and 3.4% of the population were below the poverty line, including 8.0% of those under age 18 and 3.0% of those age 65 or over.
