= Fort Pierce Inlet State Park =

State park in Florida, United States

- IUCN category IV (habitat/species management area)
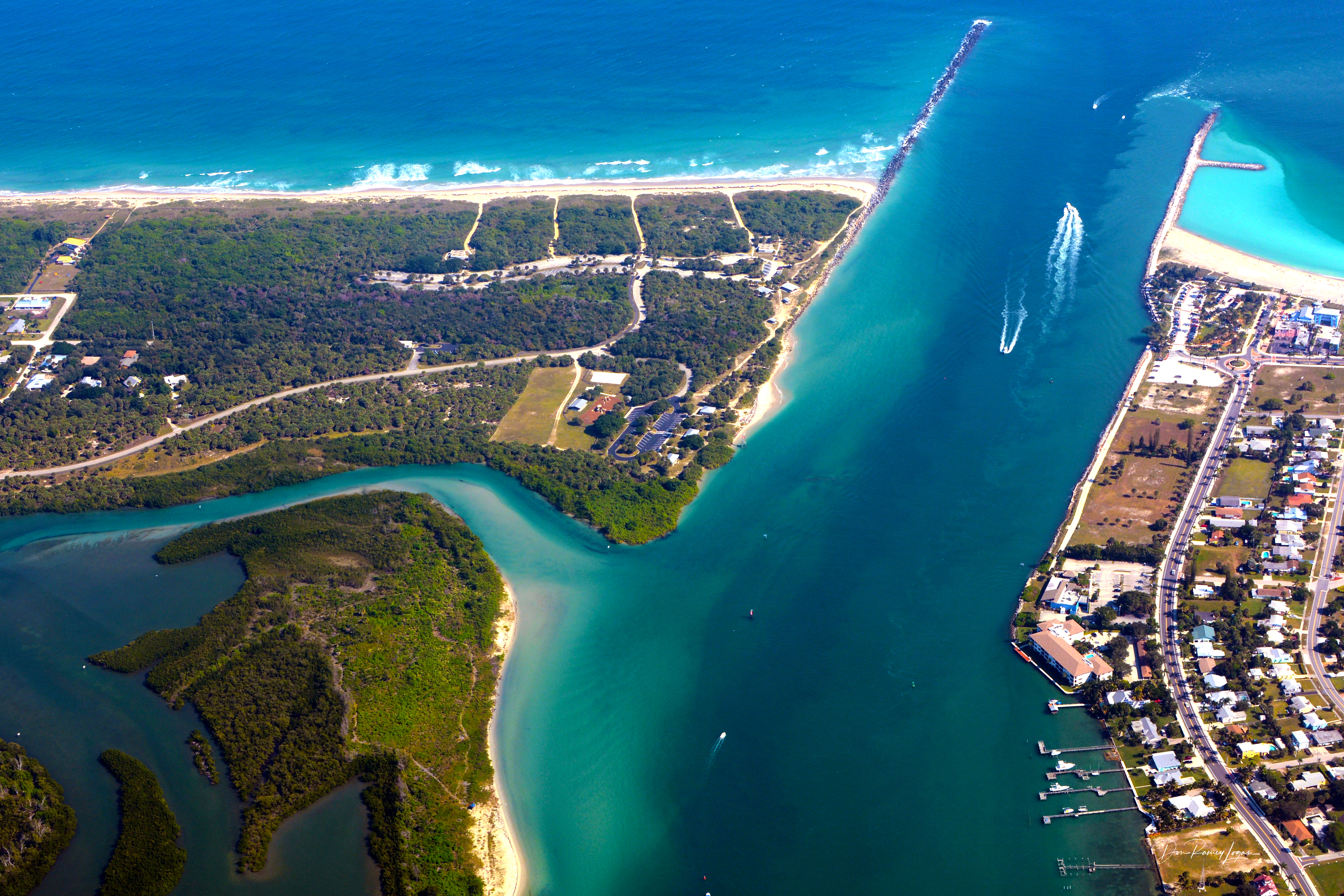
- Aerial view of the inlet

- Location within Florida Location within the United States
- Interactive map of Fort Pierce Inlet State Park
- Location: North Hutchinson Island, St. Lucie County, Florida, USA
- Nearest city: Fort Pierce, Florida
- Coordinates: 27°28′59″N 80°18′22″W
- Area: 340 acres (1.4 km^{2})
- Governing body: Florida Department of Environmental Protection

Fort Pierce Inlet State Park, a 340-acre (1.4 km^{2}) part of the Florida State Park system, is located just north of the Fort Pierce Inlet, on North Hutchinson Island, near Fort Pierce. It consists of beaches, dunes and a coastal hammock between the Atlantic Ocean and the waters of Tucker Cove, an indentation of the Indian River Lagoon.

== Recreational Activities ==
The primary use of the park is as a recreation area. Activities include fishing, swimming, surfing, picnicking, hiking, and birding as well as scuba diving, and snorkeling. Amenities include a half-mile beach, a paved bike path, picnic area, a nature trail, and a reef about 100 yards (91 m) from the beach.

== Jack Island State Preserve ==
Jack Island State Preserve, located a mile north of Fort Pierce Inlet State Park on State Road A1A is under the same management as the state park. Jack Island features trails for hiking, biking, and studying nature. At the west end of its Marsh Rabbit Run Trail, there is an observation tower with views of the Indian River and of Jack Island itself.

== Gallery ==
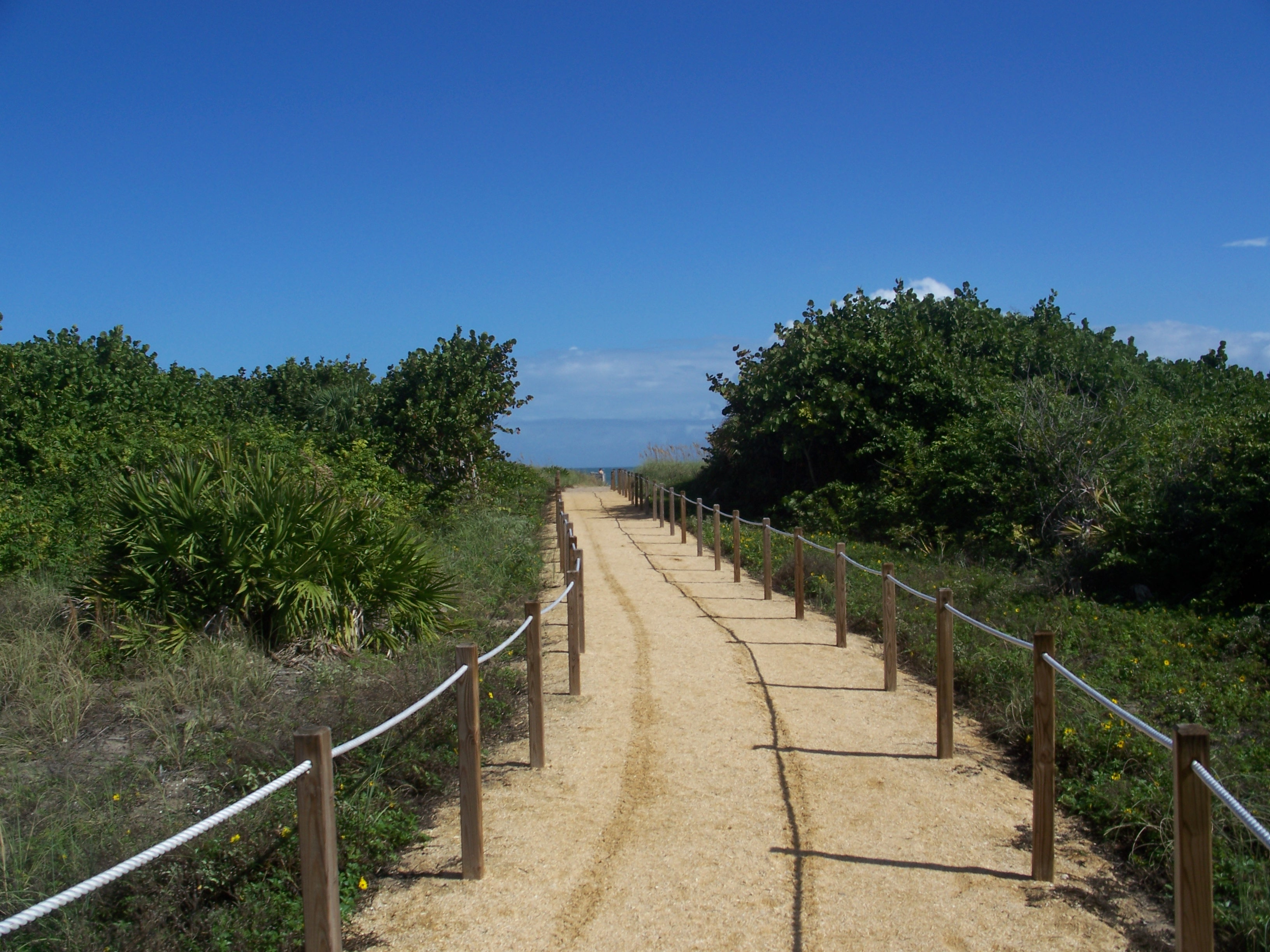
Path leading to the beach

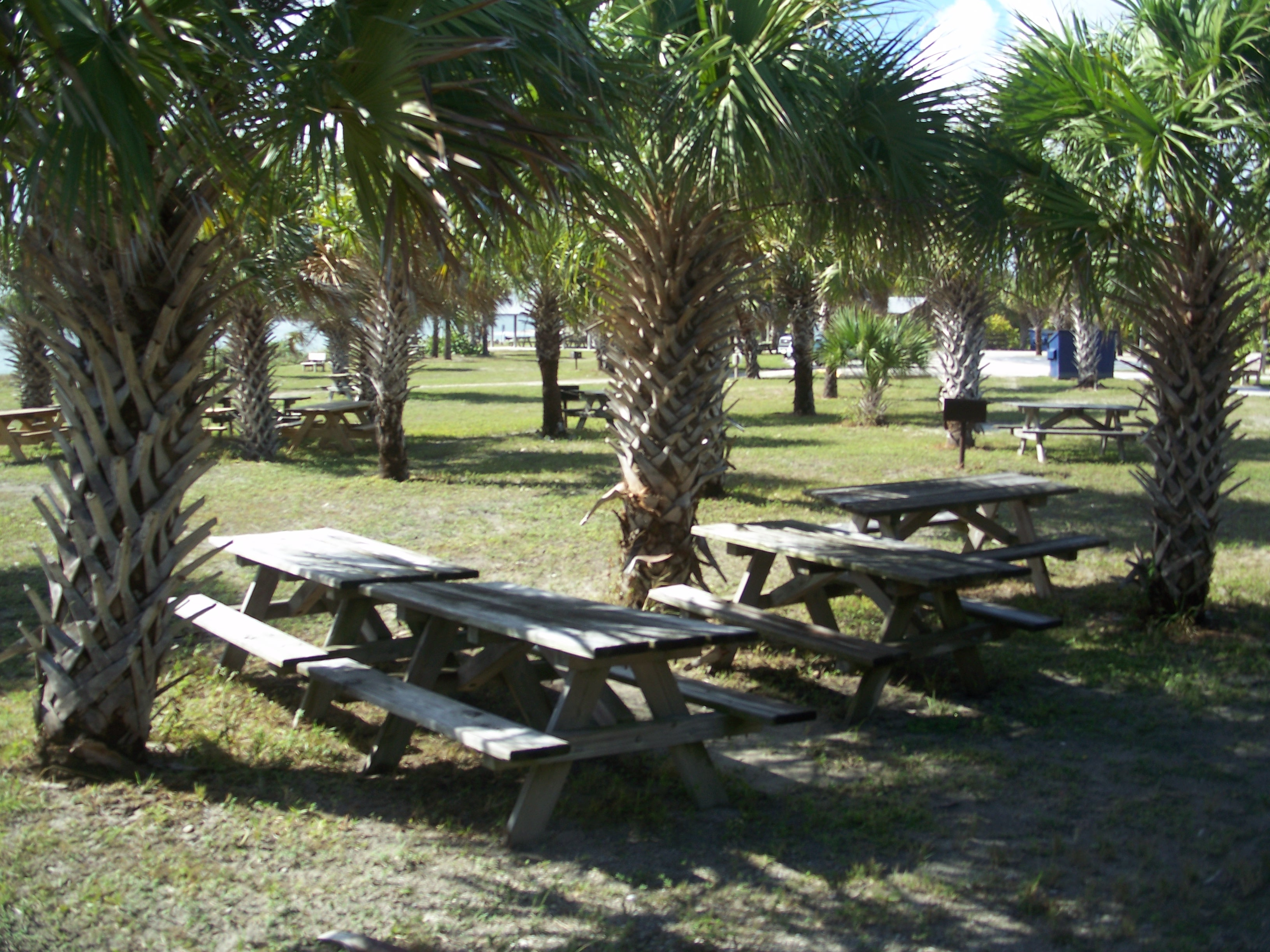
Picnic area

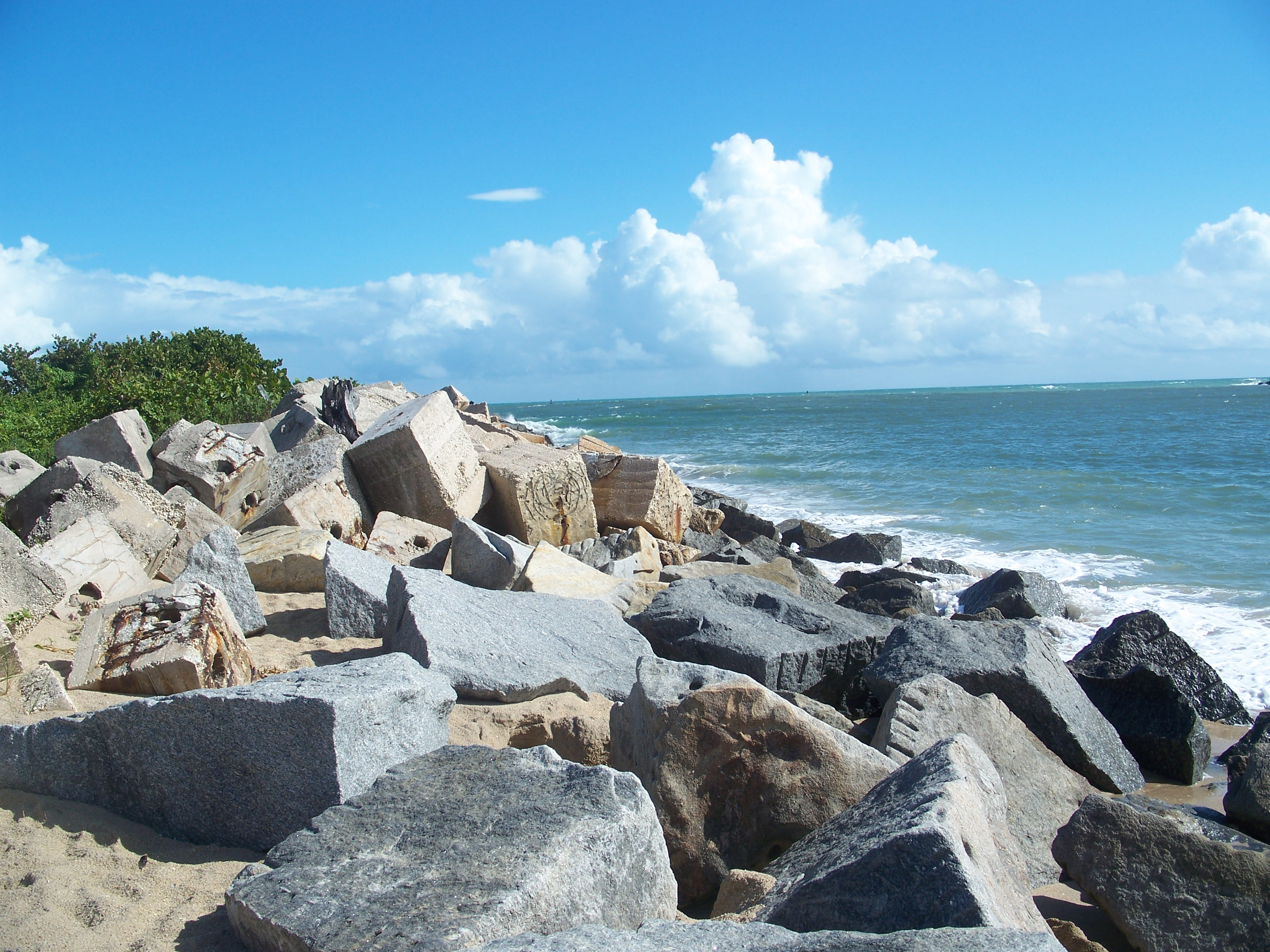
Jetty at the inlet
