= Sebastian Inlet State Park =

Florida State Park

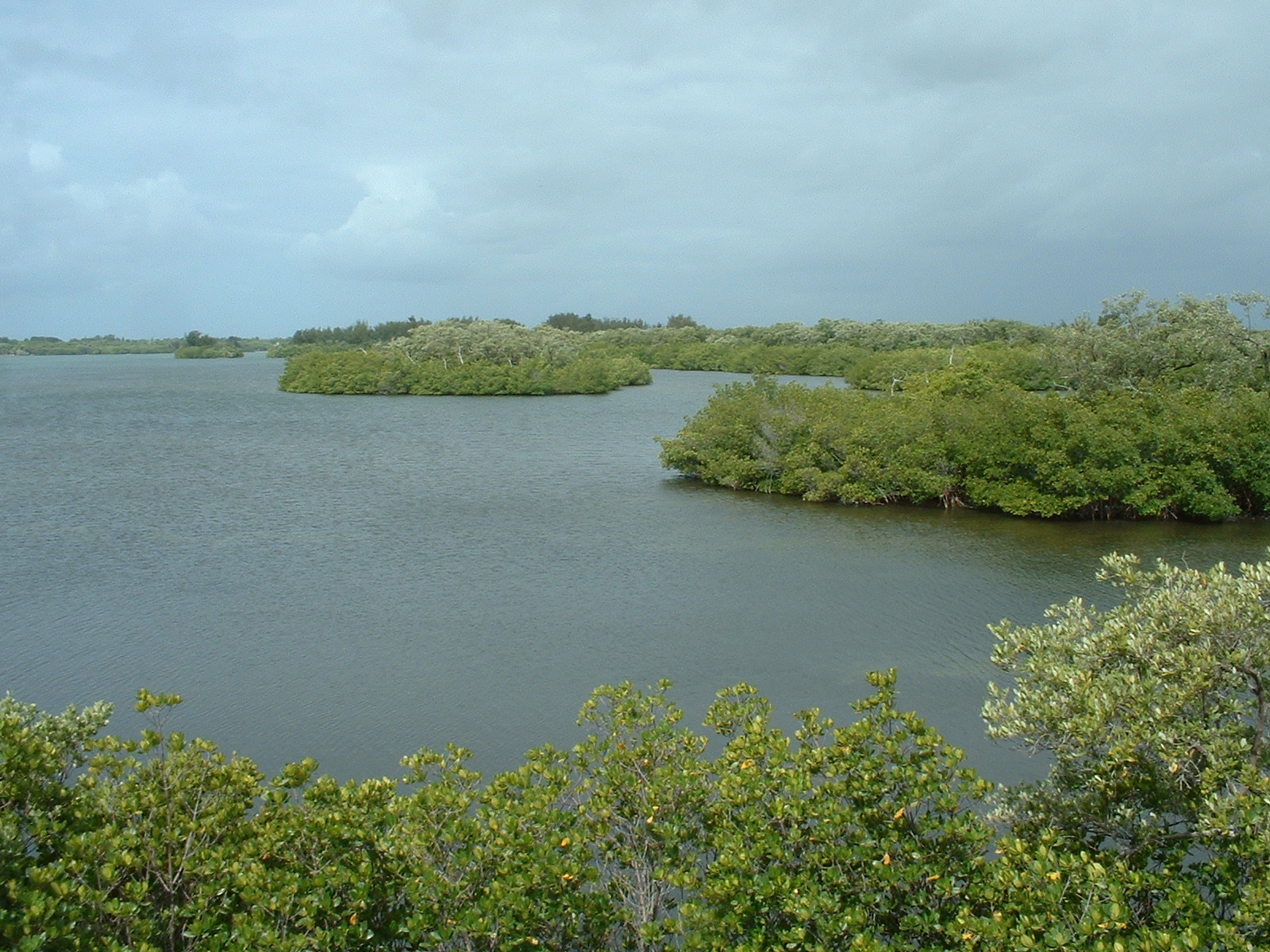
- Indian River shoreline of Sebastian Inlet State Park

- Location within Florida Location within the United States
- Interactive map of Sebastian Inlet State Park
- Location: Brevard and Indian River counties, Florida, United States
- Nearest city: Sebastian, Florida
- Coordinates: 27°51′05″N 80°26′41″W
- Area: 306 ha (760 acres)
- Established: August 12, 1970
- Visitors: 700,000 (in 2006)
- Governing body: Florida Department of Environmental Protection

Sebastian Inlet State Park is a Florida state park located 16.1 km (10 mi) south of Melbourne Beach and 9.7 km (6 mi) north of Vero Beach in Florida. The park lies on both sides of the Sebastian Inlet, which forms the boundary between Brevard and Indian River counties. The land for the park was acquired by the state of Florida in 1971. In 2010, it was the second most visited state park in Florida.

== Geography ==
The park occupies 755 acres (3.06 km^{2}) on the barrier island on the Atlantic coast of Brevard County, at a point where a channel links the Indian River intracoastal waterway with the Atlantic. Part of the park is south of the inlet on North Vero Beach in Indian River County

== History ==
A Spanish fleet was wrecked in this area in 1715. The site where the survivors camped was added to the U.S. National Register of Historic Places on August 12, 1970, under the title of Spanish Fleet Survivors and Salvors Camp Site. Today, the McLarty Treasure Museum (a part of the park) exhibits artifacts relating to the wreck.

== Recreational activities ==
The park mainly provides leisure activities, particularly fishing from both its Atlantic and Indian River shores; fishing jetties extend from both sides of the inlet into the ocean. There are facilities for swimming, surfing, snorkeling and scuba diving from the 5 km (3.1 mi) of Atlantic Beach. Boats can be launched into the Indian River, and there is a marina complex at the north end of the park. Camping is permitted in a designated area.

Wildlife is abundant in the park, and the casual visitor can reasonably hope to see ospreys and many species of shorebird. Sea turtles nest in the park, and visitors during the summer may make reservations for a nighttime foray to observe nesting loggerhead turtles. The park also contains two museums: McLarty Treasure Museum and Sebastian Fishing Museum.

A tidal pool (Robert Campbell Cove) within the state park contains varied marine and bird life and permits a safe area for swimming and a beach for children.

== Hours ==
Unlike many state parks, Sebastian Inlet is open 24 hours per day.
