= McLarty Treasure Museum =

Treasure Museum in Florida, United States

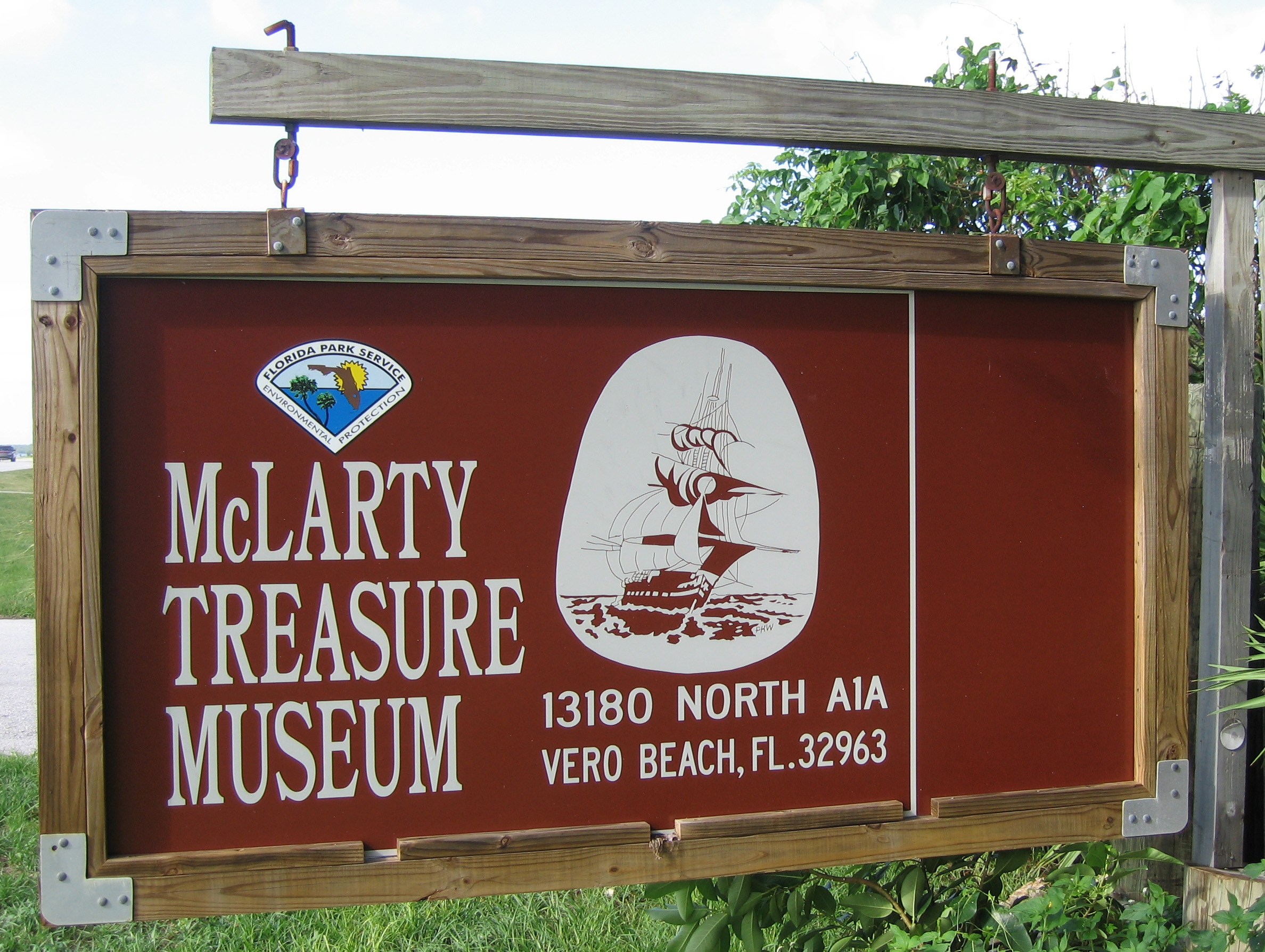

- Location within Florida
- Established: 1971
- Location: 13180 North A1A; Vero Beach, Florida
- Coordinates: 27.8339°N 80.4339°W
- Type: Maritime archaeology
- Director: Florida Park Service

The McLarty Treasure Museum is located at 13180 North A1A on North Hutchinson Island, north of Windsor and Vero Beach, Florida, on the barrier island at the north end of Indian River County. The museum occupies part of the former site of the Survivors' and Salvagers' Camp - 1715 Fleet, and is part of Sebastian Inlet State Park. It houses exhibits on the history of the 1715 Spanish treasure fleet, and it features artifacts, displays, and an observation deck that overlooks the Atlantic Ocean. An A&E Network production, The Queen's Jewels and the 1715 Fleet, is shown, telling of the fleet's attempt to return to Spain when a hurricane struck off the Florida coast 300 years ago.

The property for the museum was donated to the State by Mr. Robert McLarty, a retired Atlanta attorney who lived in Vero Beach.

== See also ==
- List of maritime museums in the United States

== Gallery ==
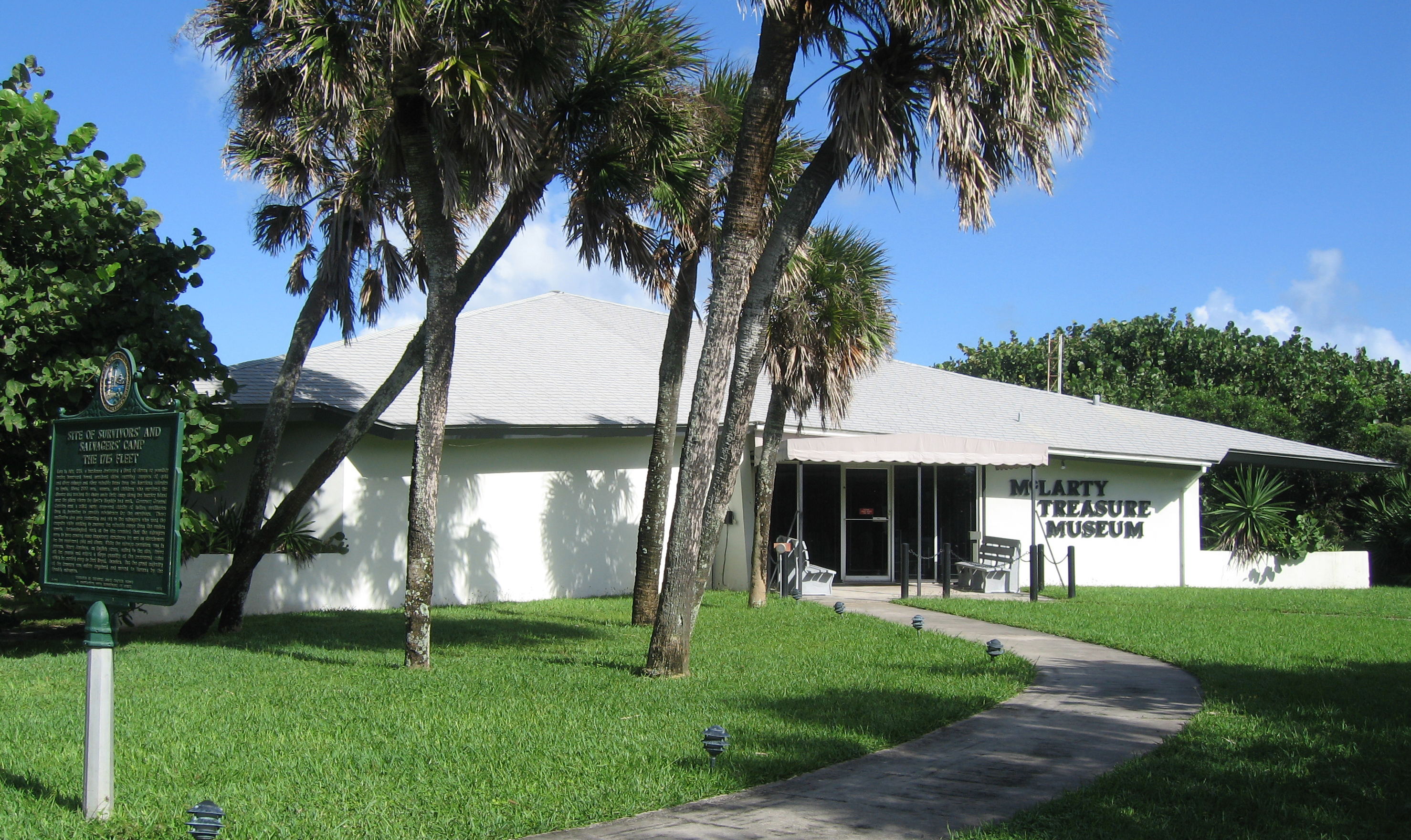
Front view of McLarty Treasure Museum

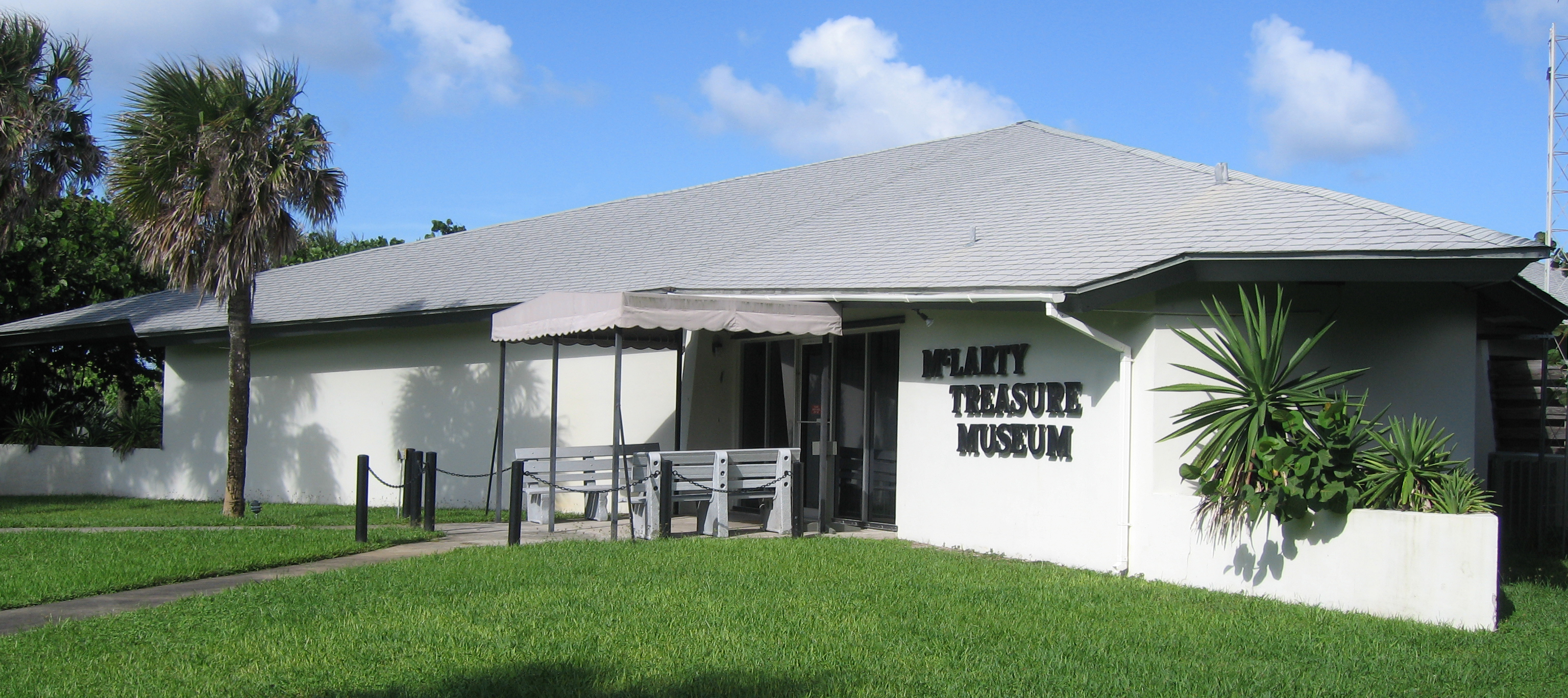
Front oblique view of McLarty Treasure Museum

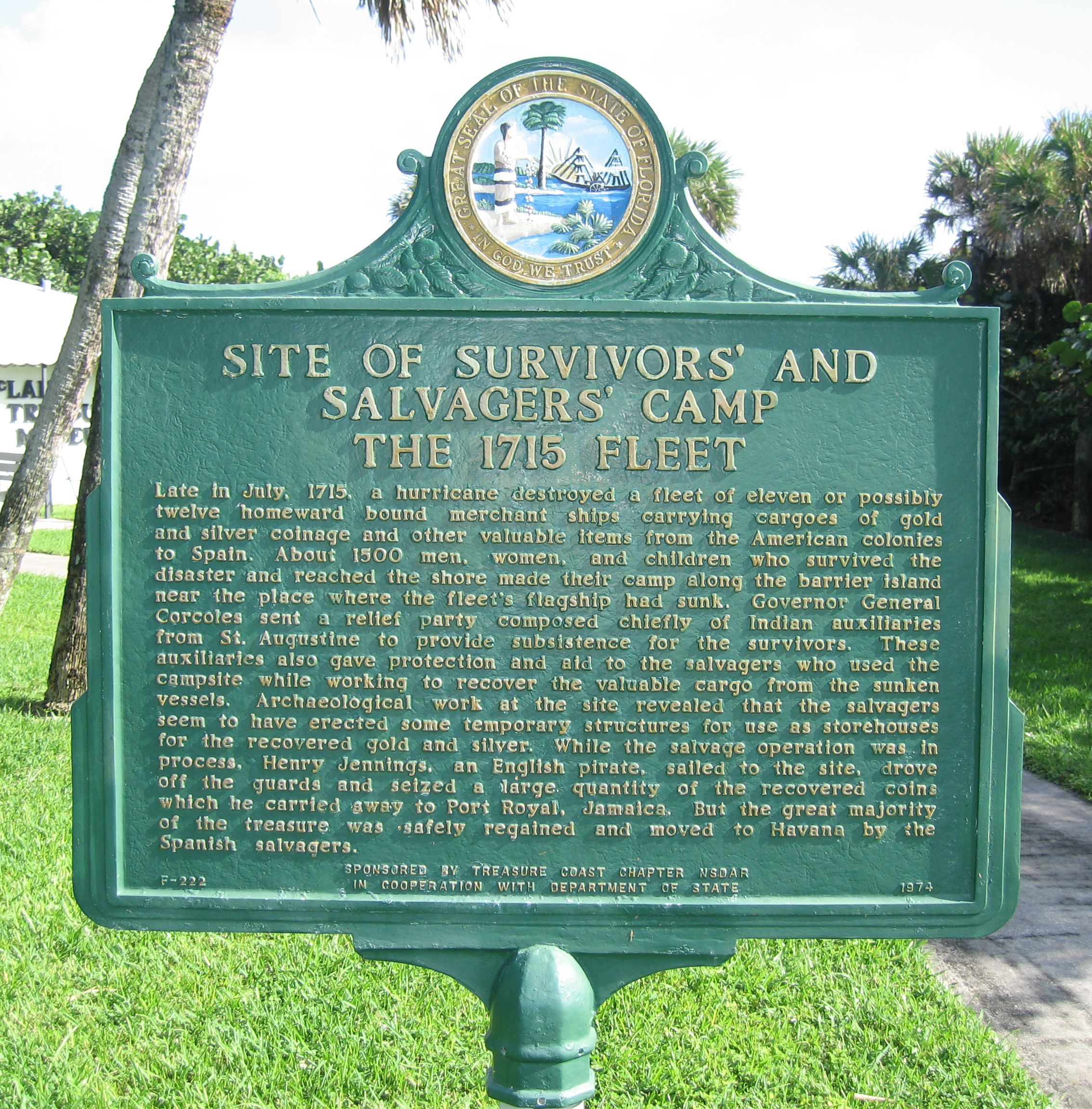
Historical marker in front of museum designating the site of the Survivors' and Salvagers' Camp - 1715 Fleet

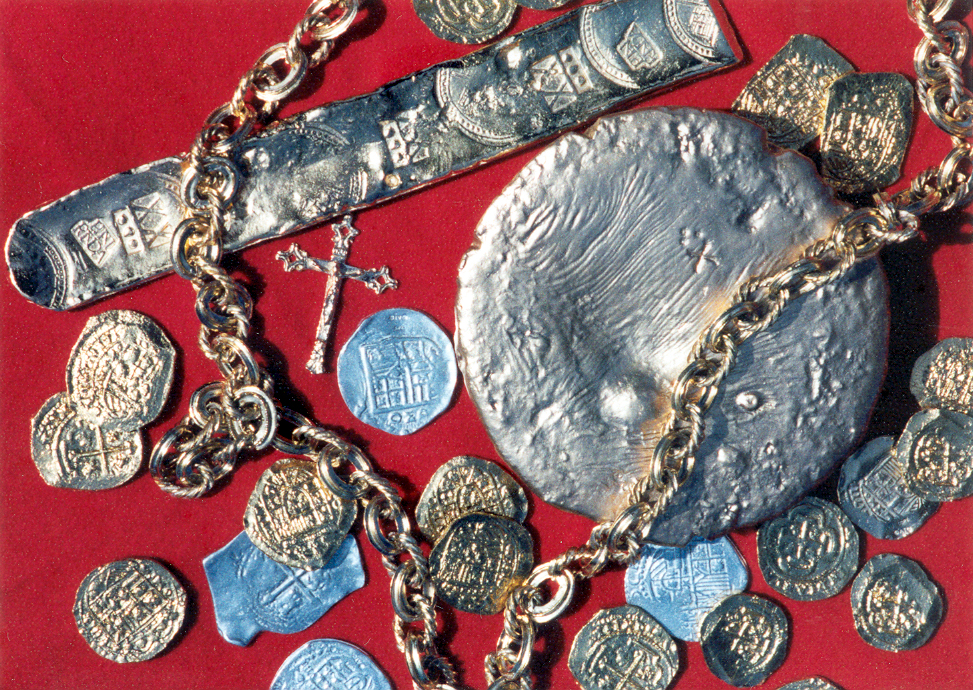
Replicas of treasure recovered from the Atocha shipwreck in the Florida Keys

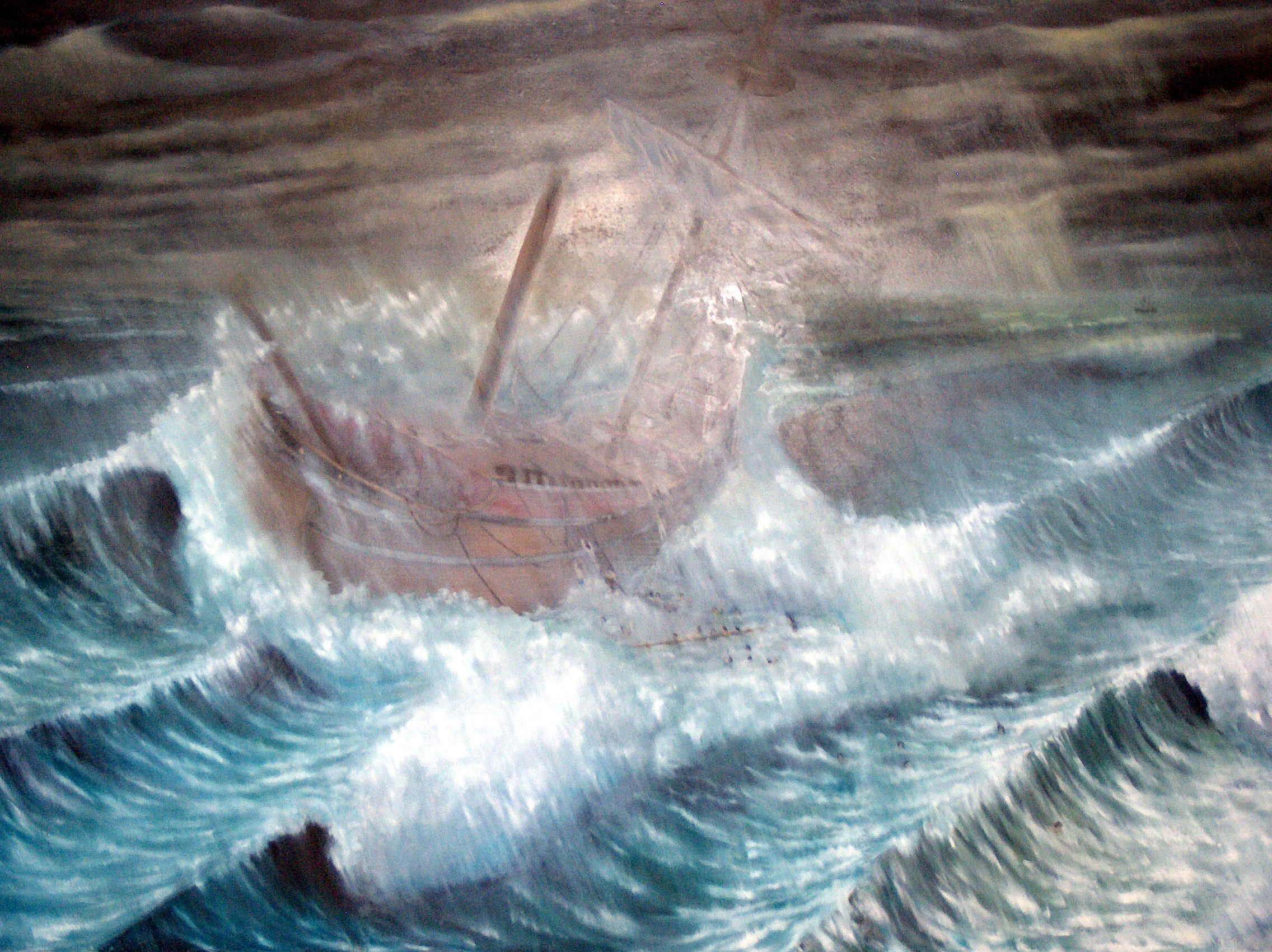
"Blown shoreward and wrecked along inshore reefs, the fleet strewed its riches along a vast stretch of Florida's eastern coast." Oil painting on three wood panels, on display in museum

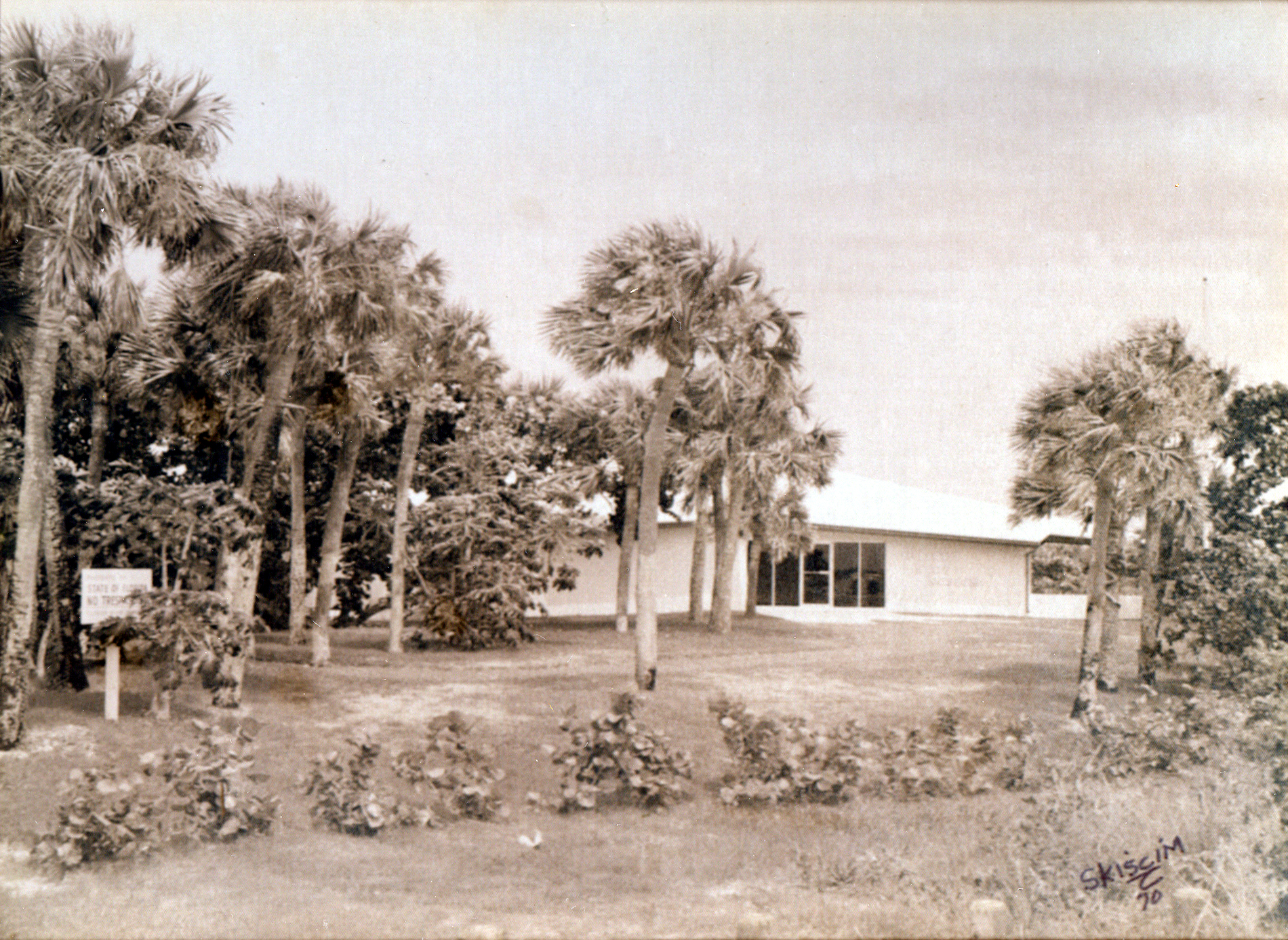
Official photo of McLarty Treasure Museum, displayed at the ceremonial opening of the museum on March 27, 1971; on display in the museum

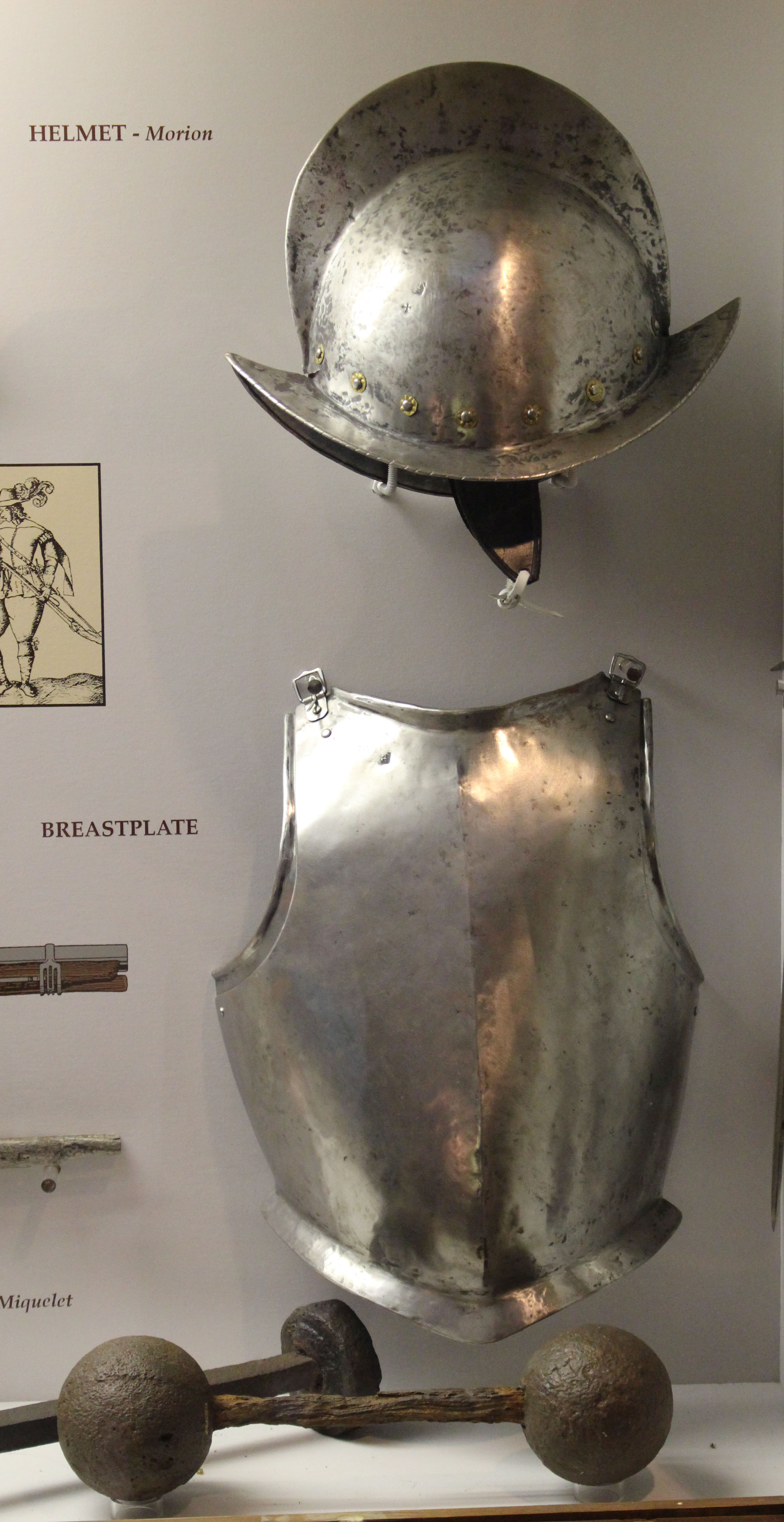
A helmet and breastplate were worn mainly by Spanish foot soldiers and helped protect the body from piercing weapons and gunfire.

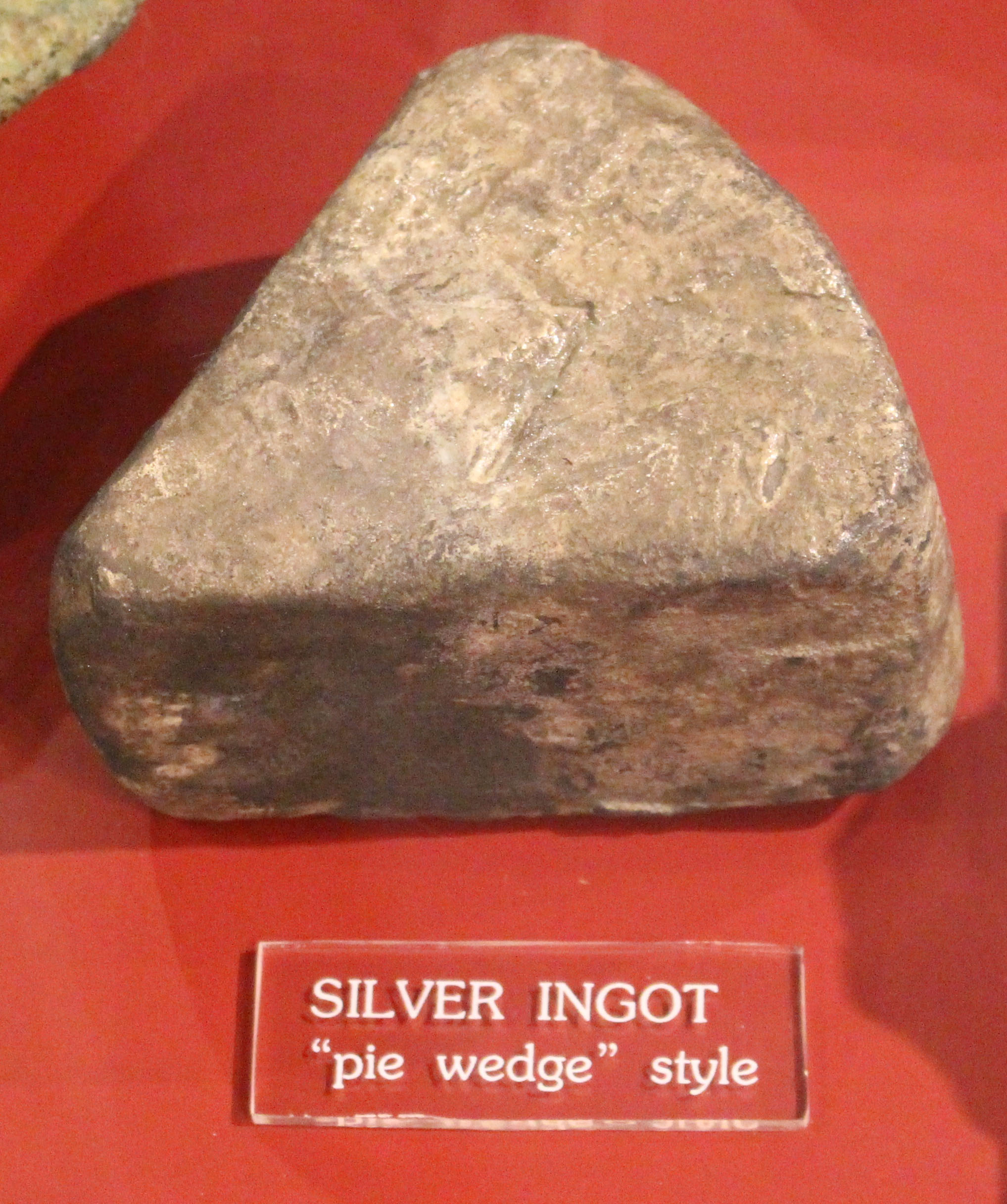
Precious metals including silver, copper, and gold were shipped back to Spain in various forms. This pie wedge of silver was shaped for shipment in a barrel.

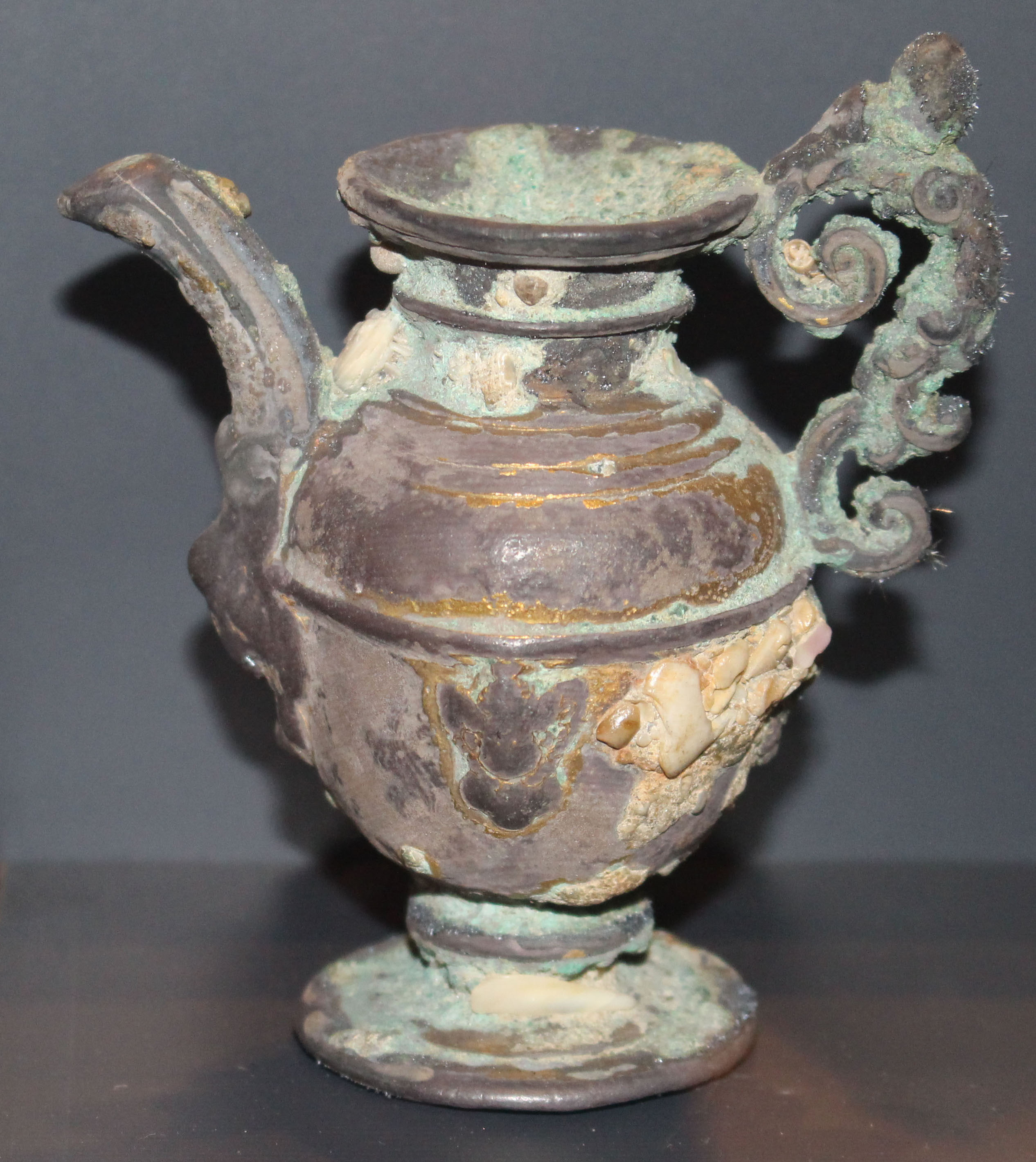
This gilded pitcher was probably used to hold perfume and was made from silver that was overlaid with gold. Much of the gold was removed from years at sea as the silver underneath corroded.

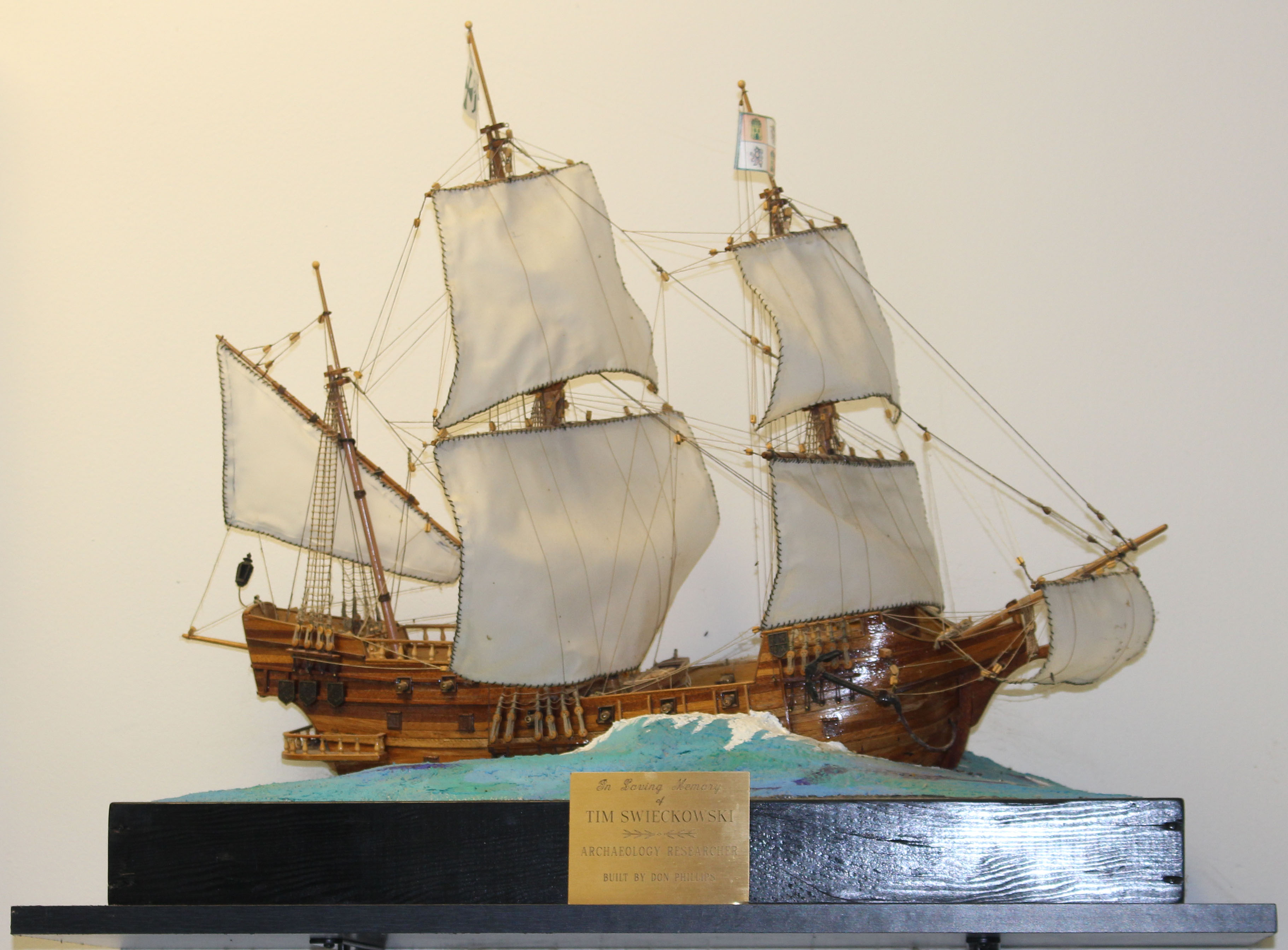
This replica galleon, called an Almiranta, was second in command of the Spanish Fleet and captained by an admiral. These warships carried most of the treasure returning to Spain, with their main duty to protect the convoy of other vessels within the fleet.

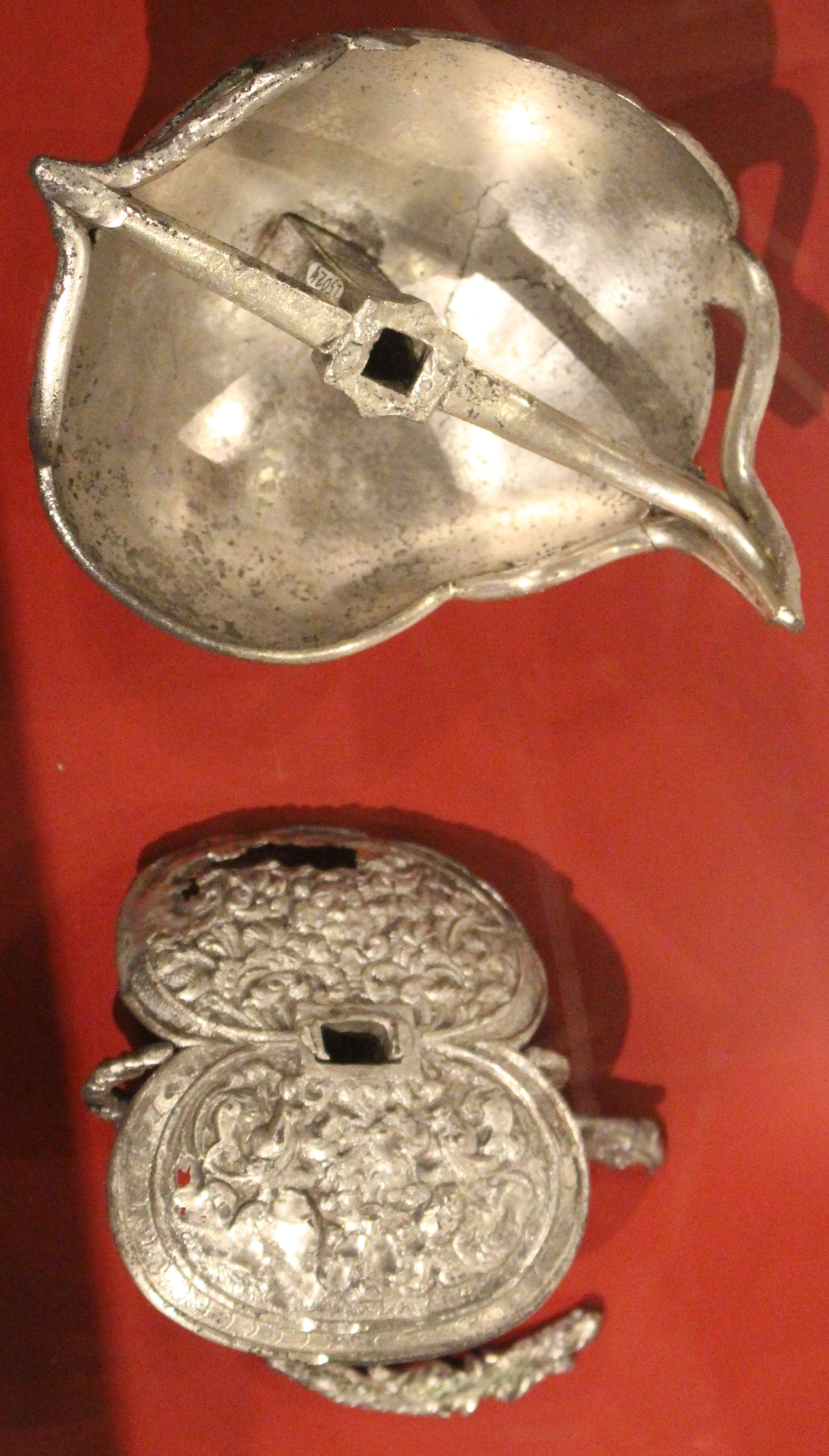
The hilts of swords are sometimes made of silver which has been worked into an ornate piece of art. The iron blades of the swords do not survive the corrosive powers of seawater and are rarely found intact with the sword hilts.

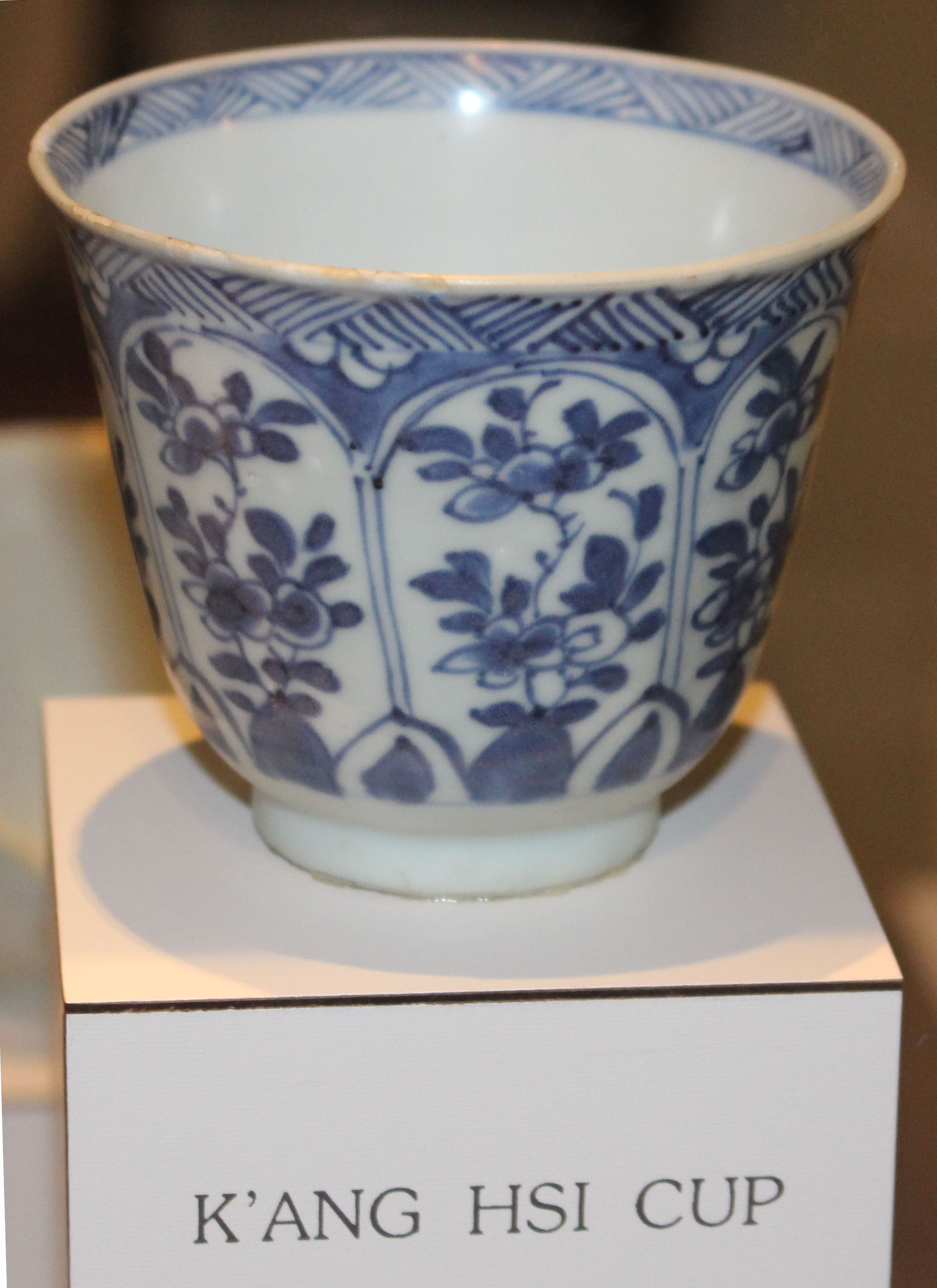
Delicate K'ang Hsi porcelain was loaded onto the 1715 Fleet galleons after a voyage halfway around the world from China aboard the Manilla Galleons in the Pacific Ocean. Mule trains from Acapulco to Vera Cruz would connect the trade routes and transport goods from the Pacific Fleet into the Atlantic Fleet.

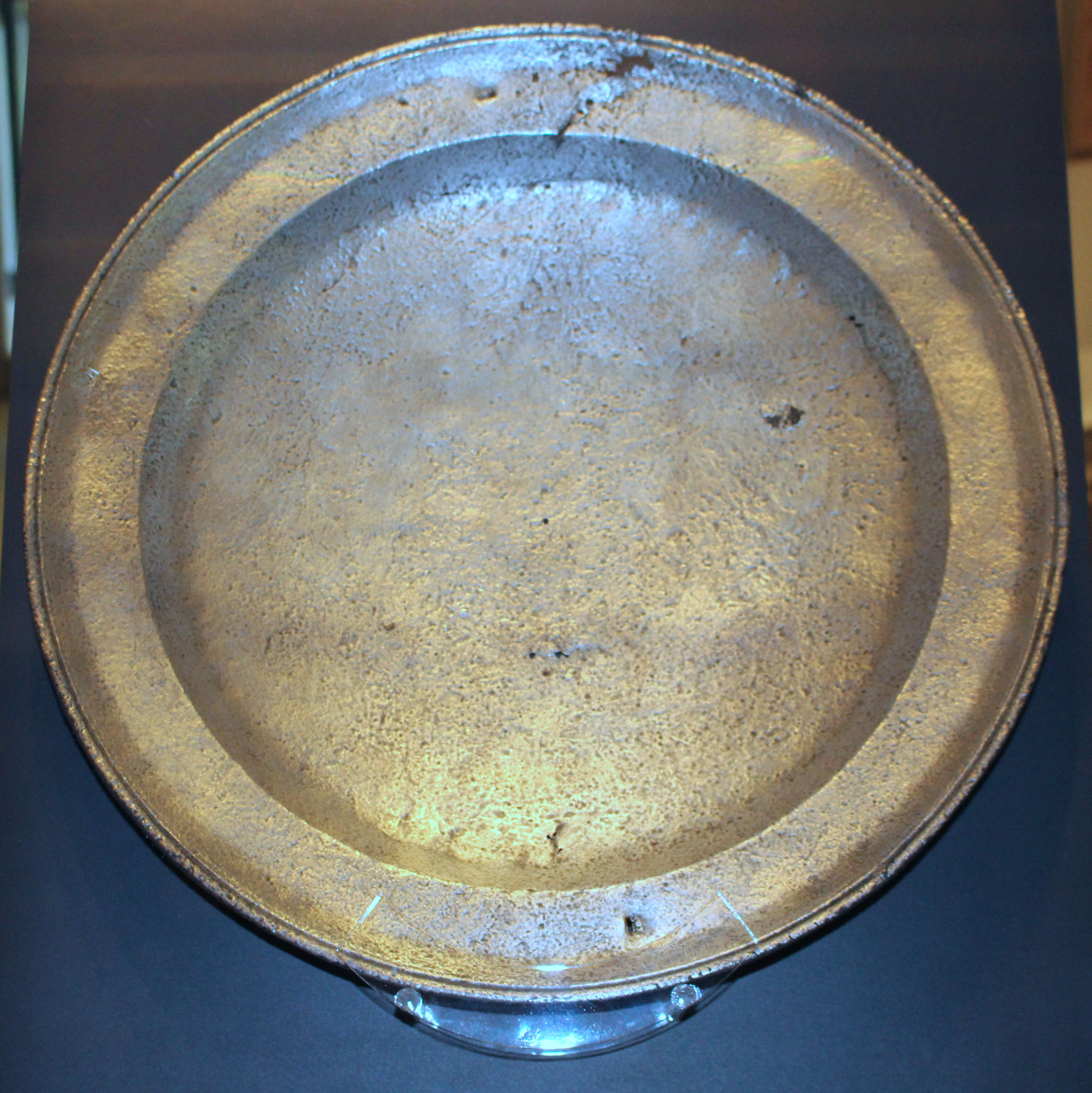
This large "charger" was a pewter plate used to serve food aboard ship.
