= Survivors' and Salvagers' Camp – 1715 Fleet =

- Spanish Fleet Survivors and Salvors Camp Site
- U.S. National Register of Historic Places
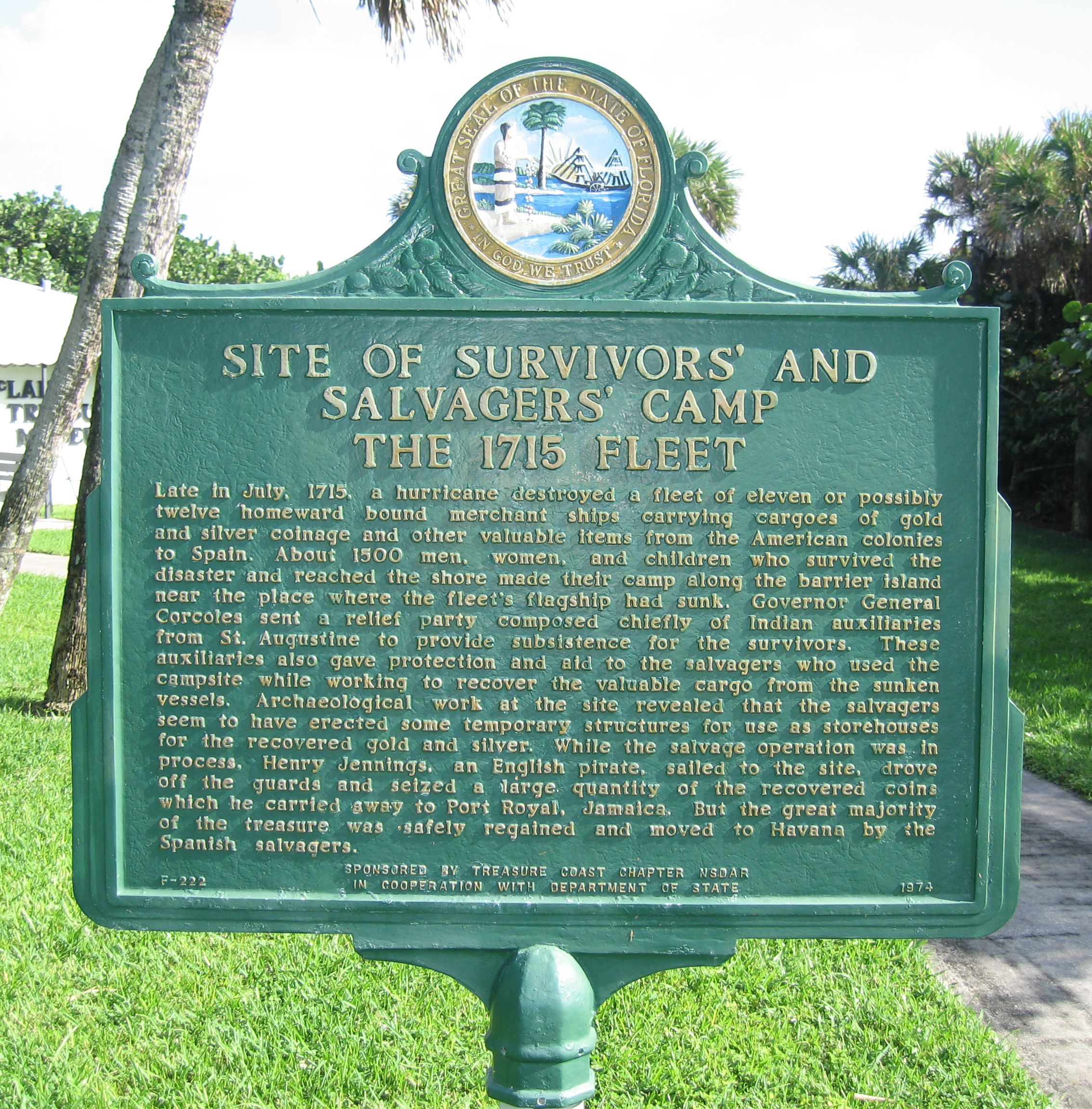
- Historical marker
- Nearest city: Sebastian, Florida, US
- NRHP reference No.: 70000186
- Added to NRHP: August 12, 1970

The Survivors' and Salvagers' Camp – 1715 Fleet is a historic site on North Hutchinson Island, Florida. Survivors of the destroyed 1715 Spanish Treasure Fleet established a camp at this location while awaiting rescue. Salvors also used the site as they recovered sunken treasure from the 1715 fleet. Currently, the McLarty Treasure Museum occupies part of the area.
