= Firecracker (disambiguation) =

Firecracker is a small explosive device primarily designed to produce a large amount of noise.

Firecracker may also refer to:

== Media ==
- Firecrackers (novel) (1925), by Carl Van Vechten
- Firecracker (1981 film), a martial arts film directed and written by Cirio H. Santiago
- Firecracker (2005 film), a film starring Mike Patton and Karen Black
- Firecracker, a television ident for BBC Two, first aired in 1993 (see BBC Two '1991–2001' idents)
- Firecracker Award for best independently published literature
- Miss Firecracker, a comedy film starring Holly Hunter and Mary Steenburgen

=== Music ===
- Firecracker (Lisa Loeb album), 1997
- Firecracker (The Wailin' Jennys album), 2006
- Firecracker EP by Unwed Sailor, 1999
- "Firecracker" (song), a 2007 song by Josh Turner
- "Firecracker", a song by Mass Production, 1979
- "Firecracker", a song by Ryan Adams from Gold, 2001
- "Firecracker", a song by Yellow Magic Orchestra from Yellow Magic Orchestra, 1978
- "Fire Cracker", a song by 808 State from Quadrastate, 1989

== Nature and wildlife ==
- Firecracker plant, ornamental plants of the genus Russelia
- Firecracker Skimmer (Libellula saturata), a North American species of dragonfly
- Arizona firecracker (Ipomopsis arizonica), a flowering plant native to the mountains of the Mojave Desert

== Other uses ==
- Coke Zero Sugar 400, an annual NASCAR race previously known as the Firecracker 400 (1963–1988) and the Firecracker 250 (1959–1962)
- Firecracker (software), virtualization software

== See also ==
- Firecracker flower (disambiguation), ornamental plants
