= James F. Hutchinson =

American painter (1932–2023)

James Frederick Hutchinson (1932 – March 15, 2023) was an American oil painter. He was inducted into the Florida Artists Hall of Fame in 2011.

== Early life ==
Hutchinson was born in 1932. He moved to Florida from New York in the early 1940s.

In 1947, Hutchinson began visiting A.E. Backus, Hutchinson's brother-in-law A. E. "Beanie" Backus, who was married to Hutchinson's sister Patsy, and started painting along his side. Backus and Hutchinson were very close friends in the late 1940s and remained so for their continued careers. They traveled to Jamaica and all over the Florida coast, painting many beautiful landscapes back to back.

During the 1950s Korean War, Hutchinson joined the Navy and was stationed in Guam. He spent his service drawing cartoons for the Stars and Stripes newspaper. After the Navy, he moved back to Vero and began working for Waldo E. Sexton at McKee Botanical Garden and Driftwood Inn and Restaurant. He met his wife Joan while attending Florida State University.

== Career ==
In the 1950s and 1960s, The Highwaymen, a group of African-American artists including Alfred Hair and Harold Newton, became close friends of Backus and Hutchinson. The Highwaymen emulated the art they saw in Backus' studio and sold quick, stylized pieces on Highway US 1 and A1A. Although Backus and Hutchinson admired and supported the energy put into the Highwaymen's work, they kept to their own entrenched and studied styles.

Once married, James and Joan lived in the now historic Golden Gate Building in Stuart Florida, when the Owen K. Murphy Foundation and The Arthur Vining Davis Foundations offered them the opportunity to live on the Brighton Seminole Reservation, where Hutchinson painted the Seminole and Miccosukee people for five years, starting in 1959. The Hutchinsons lived on the reservation with the Seminoles for those five years, producing 10 paintings a year for the State of Florida, resulting in 50 paintings depicting the Native Americans. During that time, Hutchinson became close friends with many of the Seminole elders, such as Billy Bowlegs, Charlie Cypress, Charlotte Tommy, and Bill Osceola.

Much like his brother-in-law, A.E. Backus, James Hutchinson became known for his Florida landscapes and seascapes but what distinctively separated him was his depictions of the Seminole people and culture. He cultivated a large following of collectors in Miami, Palm Beach and Vero Beach. Eventually, a large appreciation of his work was collected all over Florida and the United States. To this day, his work can be found in private collections and in many Florida museums.

In 1997, the Hutchinsons moved to Hawaii, where James painted the natural beauty of Hawaii's landscapes and its people. His Hawaiian depictions gathered a strong group of collectors throughout the islands. After spending more than a decade in Hawaii, the Hutchinsons returned to their original home in Sewalls Point, Florida. Since their return, Hutchinson has been featured in several shows both private and public along the Treasure Coast, including showings at The Elliott Museum, Singer Island, Jupiter Island Town Hall, many galleries in Miami, and the Cici and Hyatt Brown Museum of Art in Daytona.

Hutchinson's work is exhibited at Florida museums and throughout the world, including at the Florida Governor's Mansion, the Florida Capitol, Brighton Seminole Reservation, Miccosukee Reservation, Norwegian National Museum in Oslo, James Hutchinson Foundation of the Loewe Gallery at the University of Miami, the Boca Raton Museum of Art and the Hawaii Preparatory Academy's Isaac Center to name a few.

In 2021, Hutchinson returned to the Island of Hawaii where he continued his passion for painting. He died while painting at his easel on March 15, 2023, at the age of 90.
