= Arthur Glenn McKee =

- Born: January 12, 1871; State College, Pennsylvania, U.S.
- Died: February 19, 1956 (aged 85); Cleveland, Ohio, U.S.
- Resting place: Lake View Cemetery, Cleveland
- Education: Pennsylvania State University
- Occupation: Engineer
- Spouses: Marion Fairbanks Deane (m. 1899; died 1948): Bennetta Heath Alexander
- Children: 2

Arthur Glenn McKee (January 12, 1871 – February 19, 1956) was an American engineer who founded Arthur G. McKee & Co., a Cleveland-based construction firm. With Waldo Sexton, McKee also co-founded the McKee Jungle Gardens in 1929.

== Early life and education ==
McKee was born on January 12, 1871, in State College, Pennsylvania. He attended the Pennsylvania State College, where he earned a Bachelor of Science degree in 1891 and, later, a Master of Science in mechanical engineering.

== Career ==
=== Arthur G. McKee & Co. ===
On November 1, 1905, McKee established his own consulting engineering practice and opened an office in the Rockefeller Building at Superior Avenue and West Sixth Street in downtown Cleveland. In 1906, he was joined by two partners, electrical engineer Robert E. Baker and construction engineer Donald Herr. During this period, McKee developed several blast furnace specialties, including a revolving distributor top, stock bins and test rods, on which he held numerous patents; the patent holding company Blast Furnace Appliance Co. was organized to license the designs to the iron and steel industry. The firm was formally incorporated as Arthur G. McKee & Co. in 1915, with McKee serving as president until 1946.

Under McKee, the company acquired the Oklahoma-based Widdell Engineering Co. In 1941, it relocated, to 2300 Chester Avenue, and during World War II it was engaged in the design and construction of American defense plants. In a 1930 paper co-authored by McKee for the American Society of Mechanical Engineers, he wrote about the trend toward blast furnaces of 1,000-ton daily capacity and the use of blast furnace gas in coke ovens, open-hearth steelmaking and steel mill heating equipment. McKee stepped down as president in 1946 and served afterwards as chairman of the company's advisory committee.

After McKee's death, the firm continued to expand internationally, opening subsidiaries in Canada, Australia, Europe and South America during the 1950s and 1960s. In November 1978, Arthur G. McKee & Co. was acquired by Davy International of London for $106 million, and in June 1979 the firm was renamed Davy McKee Corp.

=== McKee Jungle Gardens ===
In 1929, McKee joined with Vero Beach pioneer Waldo Sexton to purchase an 80-acre (32 ha) tropical hammock along the Indian River in Vero Beach, Florida. The two engaged landscape architect William Lyman Phillips, who had earlier designed Fairchild Tropical Botanic Garden and Bok Tower Gardens, to design the site's streams, ponds, trails and specimen plantings, and consulted the plant explorer David Fairchild on horticultural matters. The attraction opened to the public in 1932 as McKee Jungle Gardens. The remaining 18-acre core was preserved by the Indian River Land Trust in 1995 and reopened in 2001 as the McKee Botanical Garden. The site was added to the National Register of Historic Places on January 7, 1998, under its original name.

== Personal life ==
McKee married Marion Fairbanks Deane on April 20, 1899. They had two daughters, Mary Katherine and Marion Glenn. After his first wife's death on June 4, 1948, he married Bennetta Heath Alexander, who survived him.
