= McKee Botanical Garden =

- McKee Jungle Gardens
- U.S. National Register of Historic Places
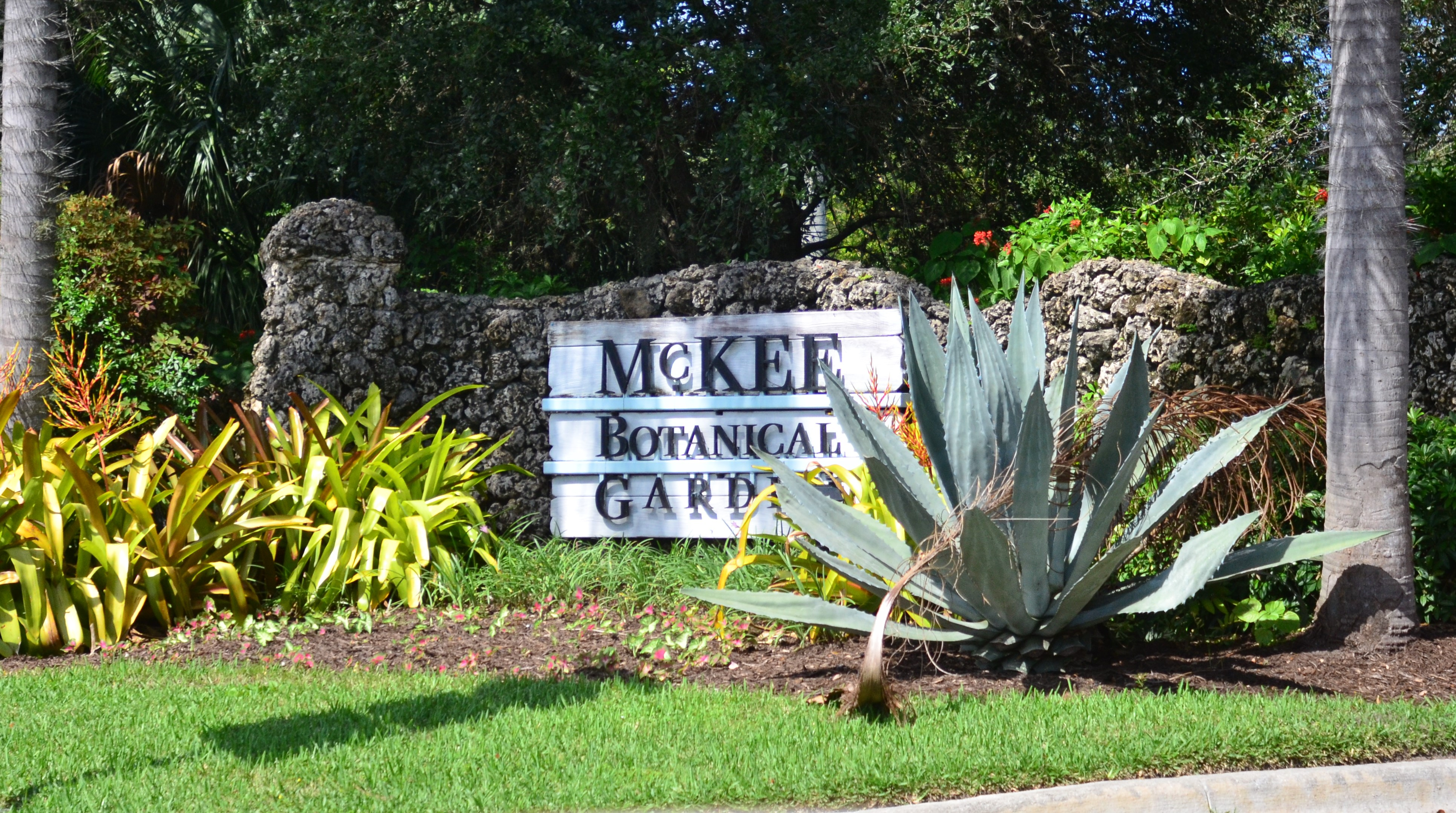
- Entrance sign.
- Location: 350 U.S. Highway 1 Vero Beach, Florida
- Nearest city: Vero Beach, Florida
- Coordinates: 27.6076°N 80.3820°W
- Area: 18 acres (7.3 ha)
- Architect: William Lyman Phillips
- Website: McKeeGarden.org
- NRHP reference No.: 97001636
- Added to NRHP: January 7, 1998

The McKee Botanical Garden with an area of 18 acres (7.3 hectares) is a non-profit, subtropical botanical garden in Vero Beach, Florida. It is located at 350 U.S. Highway 1, Vero Beach, Florida.

== History ==
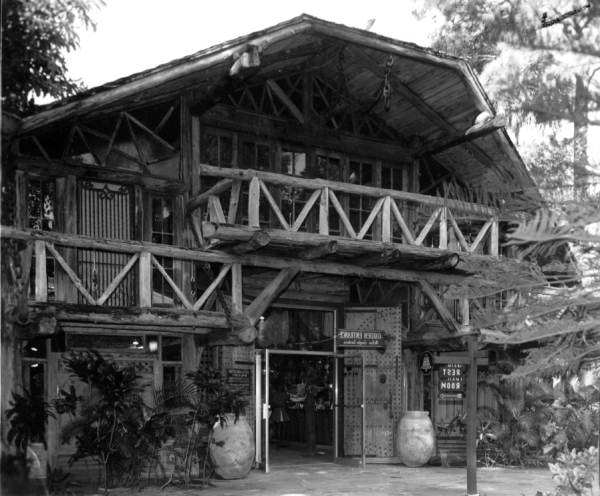
Hall of Giants, c. 1970. Built in 1941, would later be rebuilt in 1997.

The garden was founded in 1929, when Waldo E. Sexton and Arthur G. McKee, a millionaire engineer, purchased an 80-acre (32 ha) tropical hammock along the Indian River. Famous plant explorer Dr. David Fairchild was consulted, and tropical landscape architect William Lyman Phillips was hired to design its streams, ponds, and trails. Its indigenous vegetation was supplemented with ornamental plants and seeds from around the world.

The garden was opened as a tourist attraction in 1932, using the name McKee Jungle Gardens. Although the garden was operated successfully for several decades, it shut down in 1976, and most of its land was sold for development. The site remained vacant for twenty years until the Indian River Land Trust purchased it in 1995. The current garden was formally dedicated in 2001. It is now a Florida landmark and on January 7, 1998, it was added to the U.S. National Register of Historic Places under its original name of McKee Jungle Gardens. Currently, there are several buildings on the grounds of the garden, including the office, gift shop, education center and a restaurant.

== Flora ==
The Garden's collections currently include:

- Adenium obesum
- Aechmea 'Blue Tango'
- Aechmea leuddemanniana 'Mend'
- Aechmea pineliana var. minuta
- Aechmea 'Li'l Harvey'
- Aleurites moluccana
- Alpina purpurata 'Eileen McDonald'
- Alpinia calcarata
- Alpinia zerumbet
- Ananas comosus
- Annona glabra
- Annona muricata
- Anthurium 'White Gemini'
- Ardisia crenata
- Ardisia escallononioides
- Aristolochia gigantea
- Aristolochia grandiflora
- Asclepias species
- Bambusa chungii
- Barleria micans
- Bauhinia punctata
- Bauhinia species
- Begonia 'Beefsteak'
- Belamcanda chinensis
- Billbergia species
- Bixa orellana
- Bromelia pinguin
- Brugmansia species
- Brunfelsia jamaicensis
- Caladium 'Aaron'
- Caladium 'Florida Starburst'
- Caladium 'Florida Sweet Heart'
- Caladium 'Freda Hemple'
- Caladium 'Ginger Land'
- Caladium 'June Bride'
- Caladium 'White Queen'
- Caldium 'Scarlet Pimpernel'
- Calliandra haematocephala
- Callicarpa americana
- Callicarpa americana alba
- Canna species
- Carica papaya
- Chamaedorea tepejilote
- Citharexylum spinosum
- Clerodendron fairchildianum 'Musical Note'
- Clerodendron speciosissimum
- Clerodendrum bungii
- Clerodendrum quadriloculare
- Clerodendrum thomsoniae
- Clerodendrum ugandense
- Clivia species
- Congea tomentosa
- Cordia lutea
- Cordia boissieri
- Costus barbatus
- Crinum americanum
- Crinum asiaticum
- Crinum species (dwarf)
- Curculigo capitulate
- Curcuma species
- Delonix regia
- Dendrobium × hybrid
- Dichromena species
- Dombeya wallichii
- Dracaena fragrans
- Epidendrum 'Kauai Sunrise'
- Eucalyptus deglupta
- Ficus benghalensis
- Ficus natalensis leprieurii
- Gigantochloa pseudoarundidacea
- Glandularia tampensis
- Grewia afra
- Habranthus brachyandrus
- Hamelia cuprea
- Hamelia macrantha
- Hamelia patens
- Hedychium gardnerianum
- Heliconia rostrata
- Hibiscus coccineus
- Hibiscus rosa-sinensis
- Hoya carnosa
- Ipomoea carnea
- Jacquemontia penthantha
- Jatropha podagrica
- Justicia species
- Kaempferi pulchara
- Laelia pacavia
- Lagerstroemia speciosa
- Lantana trifolia
- Lonicera sempervirens
- Megaskepas erythrochlamys
- Mussaenda 'Dona Aurora'
- Myrsine guianensis
- Nelumbo 'Mrs. Perry Slocum'
- Nelumbo species
- Nymphaea species
- Odentatum stricta
- Oxalis 'Montana'
- Passiflora citrine
- Passiflora hahnii
- Passiflora species
- Passiflora × violacea
- Pentas lanceolata
- Petrea volubilis
- Phoenix hybrid
- Plumbago scandens
- Plumeria species
- Podranea ricasoliana
- Pseuderanthemum alatum
- Pseudobombax ellipticum
- Rondeletia leucophylla
- Ruellia brittoniana
- Russelia equisetiformis
- Russelia sarmentosa
- Sagittaria lancifolia
- Stachytarpheta urticifolia
- Vachellia farnesiana
- Victoria cruziana.

== Gallery ==
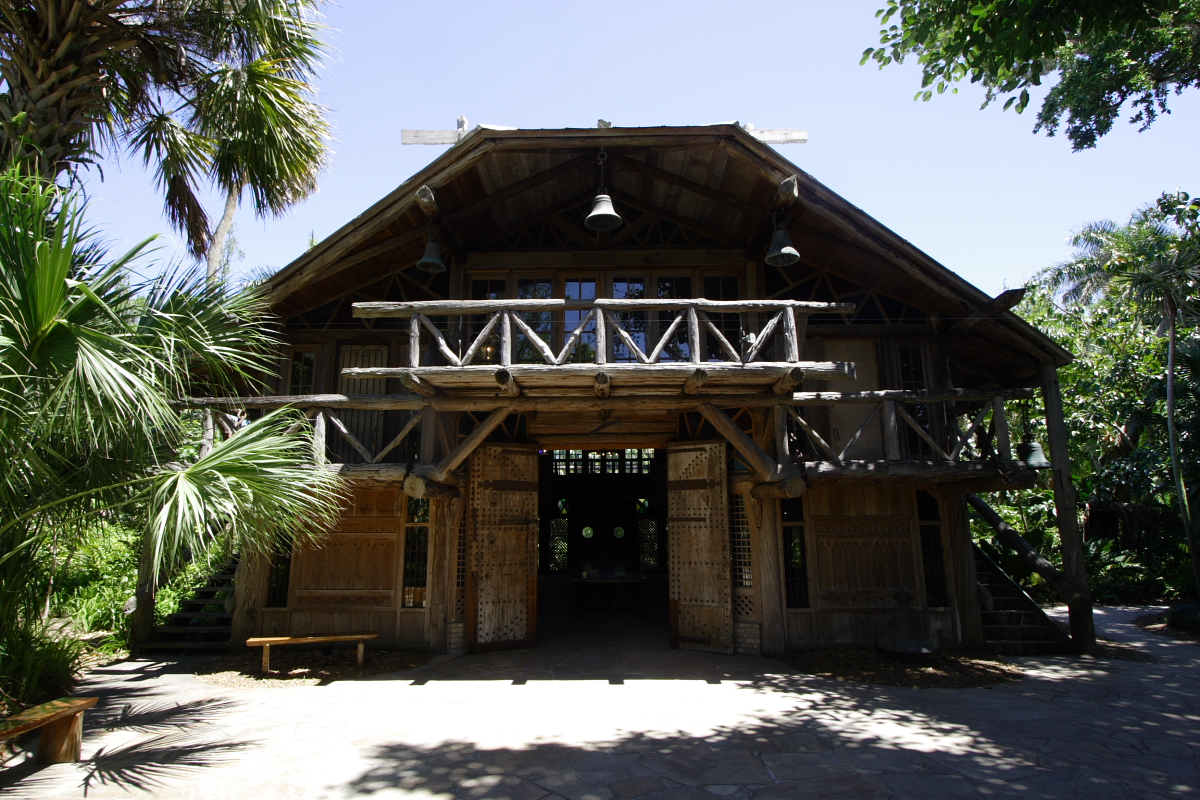
The restored Hall of Giants building.

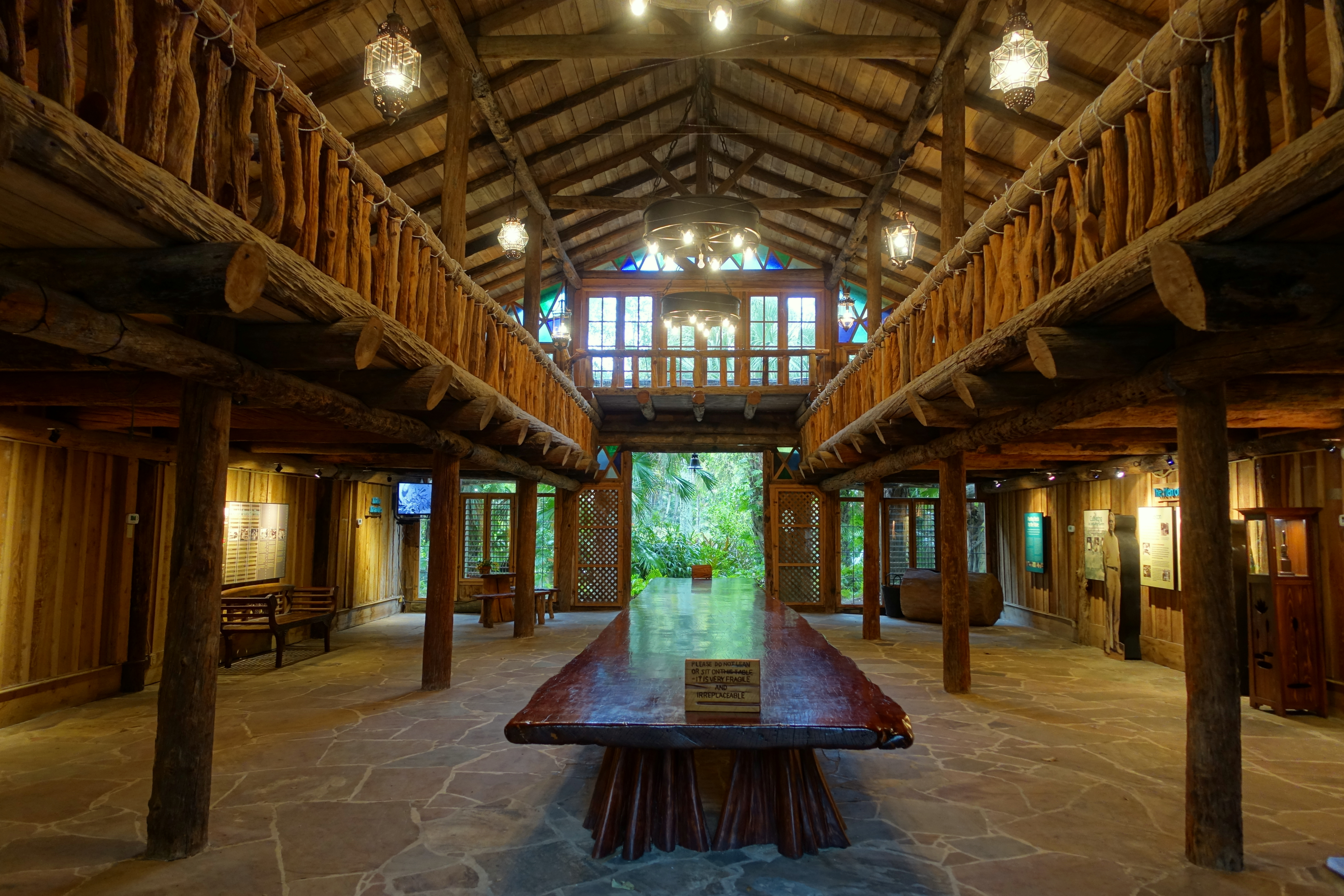
Inside the Hall of Giants.

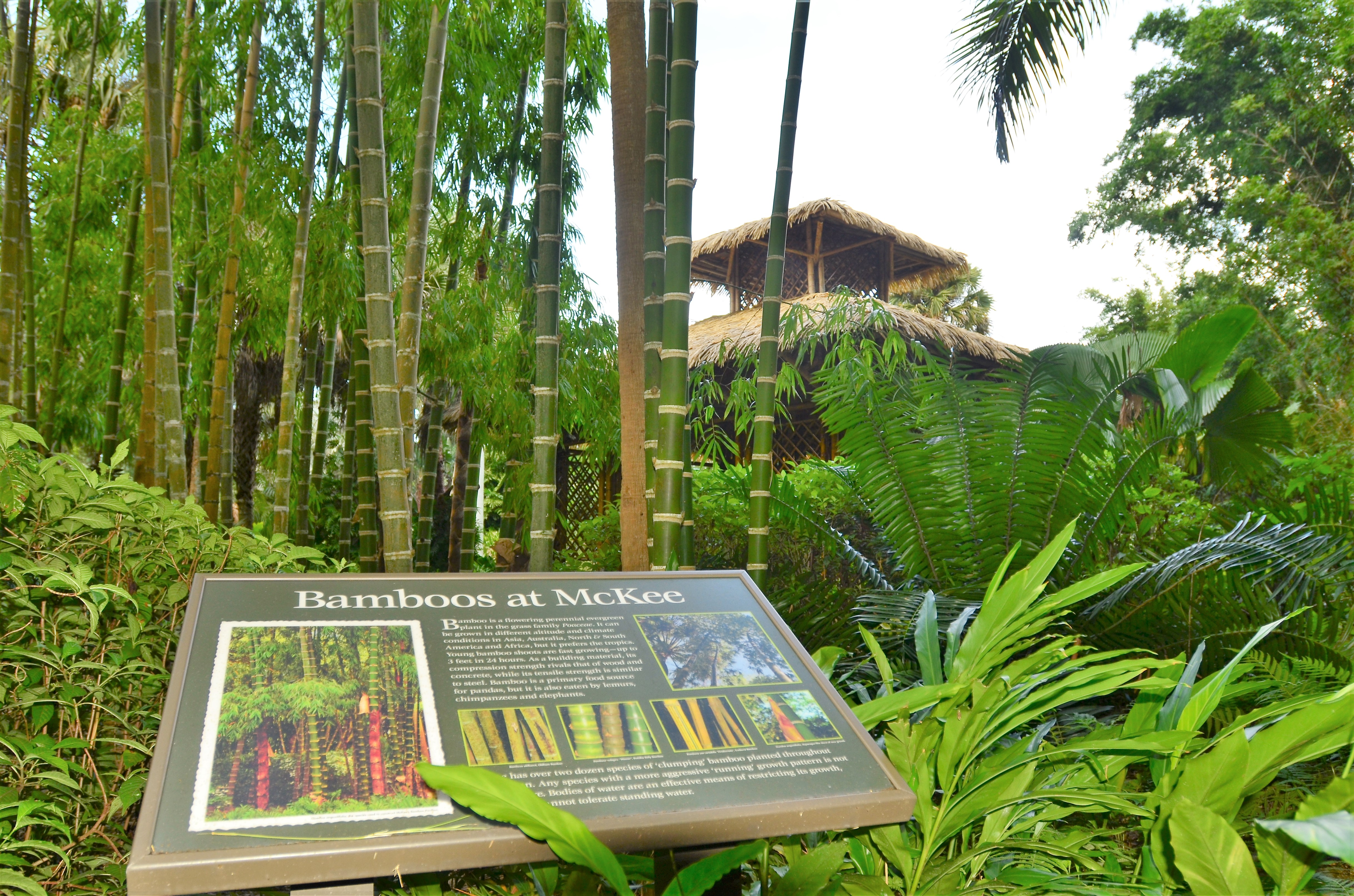
Bamboo area in the garden.

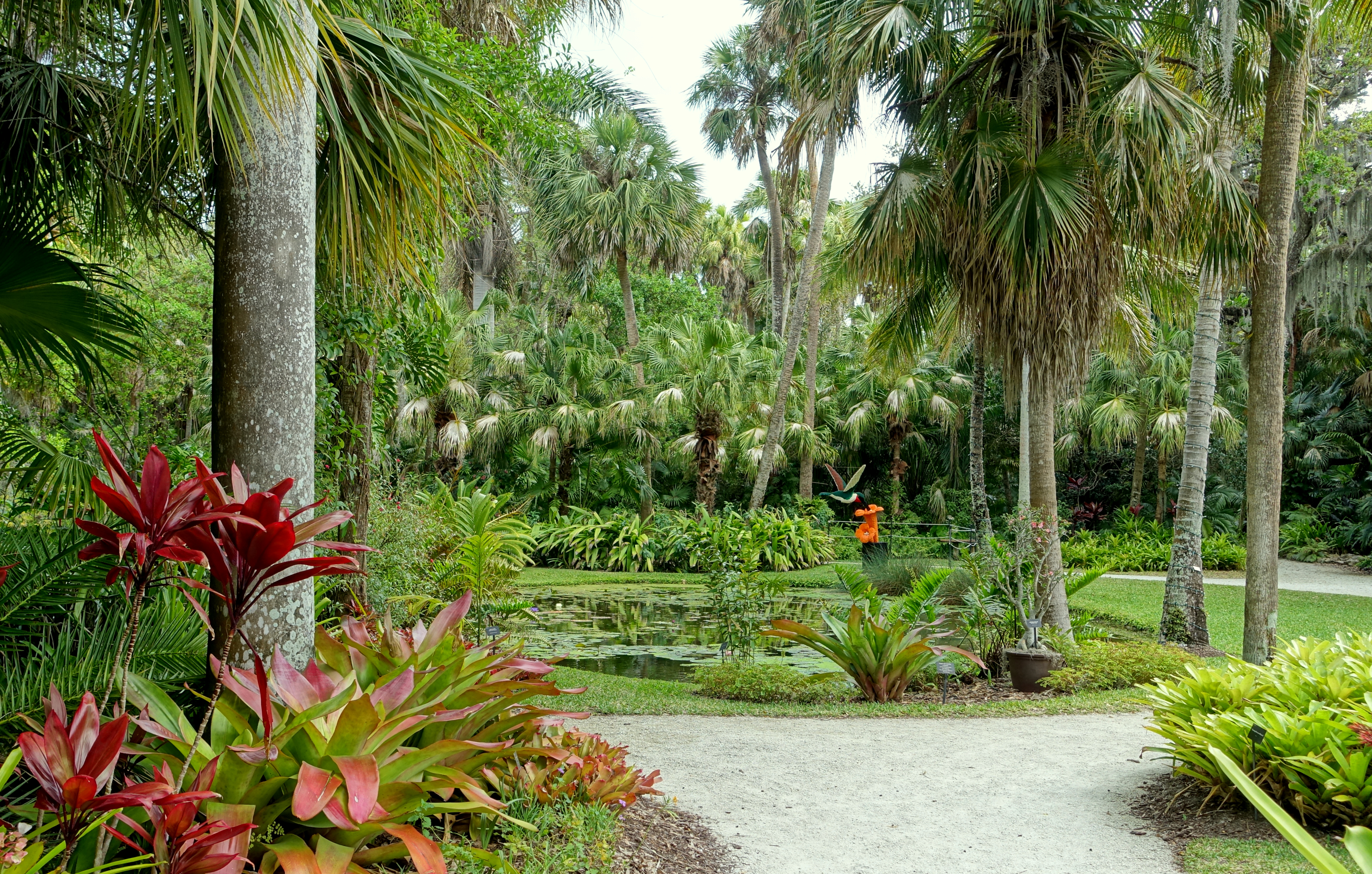
Artwork near pond.

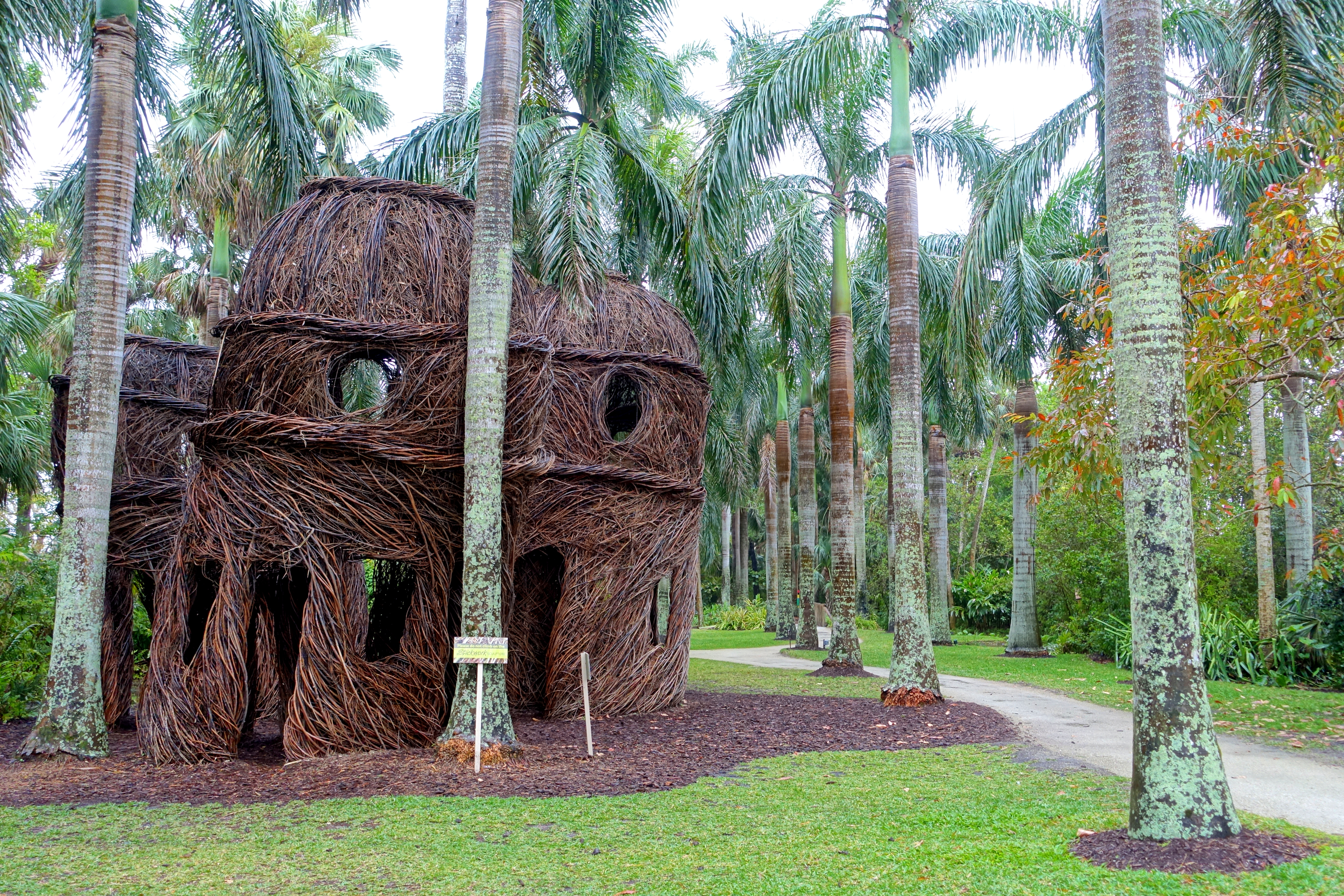
The Royals by artist Patrick Dougherty.

== See also ==
- List of botanical gardens in the United States
