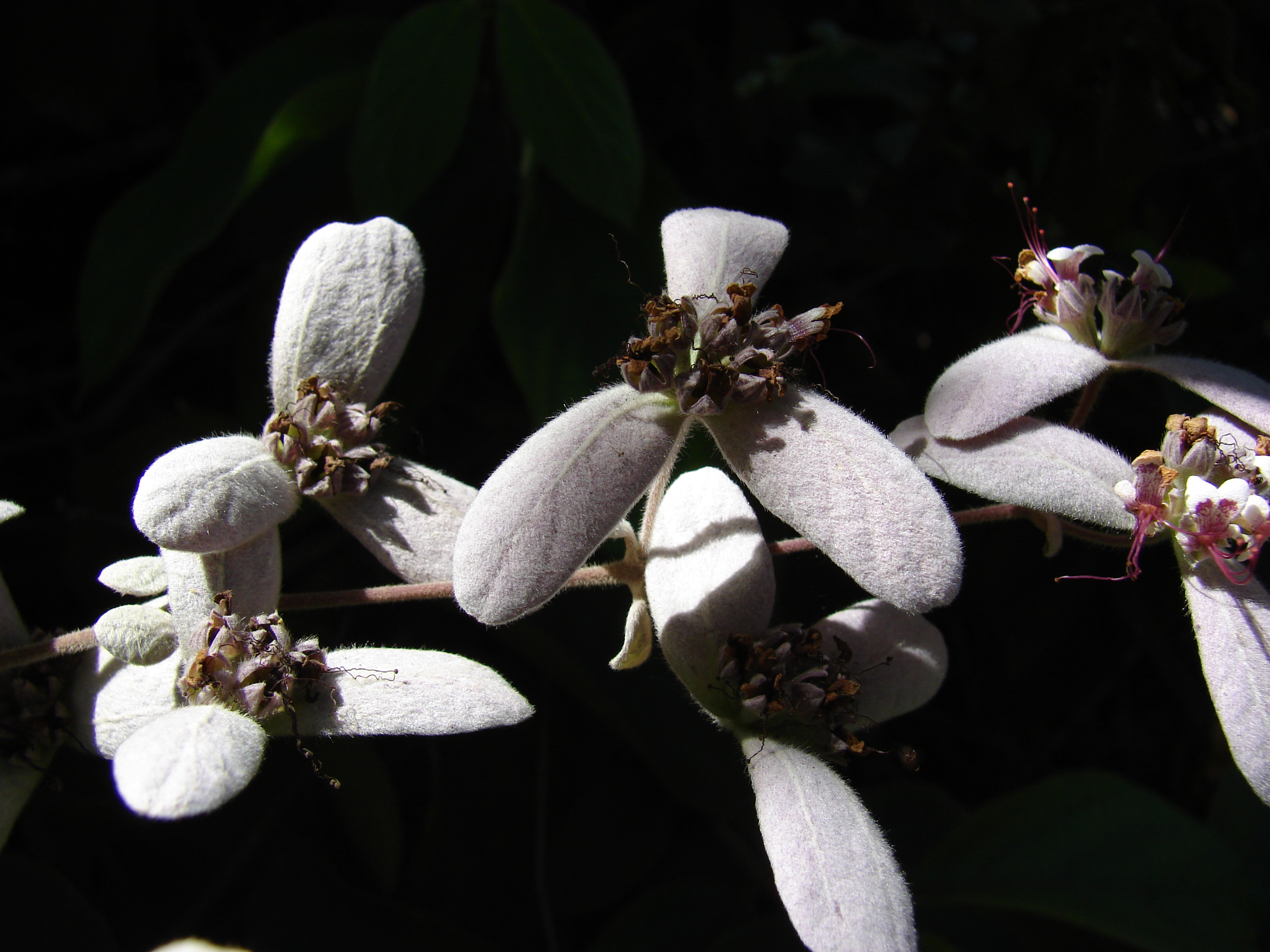

Scientific classification
- Kingdom: Plantae
- Clade: Tracheophytes
- Clade: Angiosperms
- Clade: Eudicots
- Clade: Asterids
- Order: Lamiales
- Family: Lamiaceae
- Genus: Congea
- Species: C. tomentosa

Binomial name
- Congea tomentosa Roxb.

Synonyms
- Congea azurea Wall.; Roscoea villosa Roxb.; Calochlamys capitata C.Presl; Congea villosa (Roxb.) Voigt; Congea tomentosa var. oblongifolia Schauer; Congea oblonga Pierre ex Dop; Congea petelotii Moldenke; Congea tomentosa var. nivea Munir

= Congea tomentosa =

Species of Labiate plants

Congea tomentosa is a large tropical evergreen vine, commonly referred to as wooly congea, shower orchid, or shower of orchid. (Despite the name, it is not closely related to orchids). It is called lluvia de orquideas or terciopelo in Spanish, krua on in Thai, and rong bao teng in Chinese. Native to Myanmar and Thailand, it can be found elsewhere in South Asia, including Laos, Vietnam, Malaysia (Kedah), China (Yunnan), Bangladesh, and India (Assam, Manipur, Tamil Nadu, and West Bengal). Its native habitat is mixed forests 600–1200 meters above sea level.

This tropical vine has been naturalized elsewhere, including the islands of the Caribbean, southern Florida, and southern California. In the United States, wooly congea can be grown outdoors in USDA zones 10 and 11. It does not tolerate frost.

The plant can grow to 3–5 meters (9.8–16.4 feet) in cultivation and even larger in its native state. The stems, leaves and bracts are covered with fine, downy hairs. The leaves are light green in color, 6–8 inches (15–20 centimeters) long, and quite attractive. They are evergreen with prominent veins and are arranged in opposite pairs. The actual flowers are tiny and inconspicuous, borne in the center of three showy white or violet 1 inch (2.5 centimeters) long bracts that look like velvety propellers. From late winter to spring it produces sprays of showy flowers. The bracts gradually change color through pink, lavender, and finally grey over the course of several weeks.

== Cultivation ==
It can be grown as a trailing or climbing vine, or pruned as a shrub. In frost-prone climates, it is grown in a warm greenhouse or conservatory. One should use a soil-based potting compost, provide maximum light but shade from direct sun, provide supports for the stems, and prune after flowering to contain the plant. Outdoors, it should be grown in moisture-retentive, fertile soil in full sun. It can be propagated from seed or semi-ripe cuttings and provided with bottom heat for both. The plant is easy to grow in almost any soil type. It should be watered regularly.

== Uses and gallery ==
Whole branches with their flowering clusters are useful in cut flower arrangements.

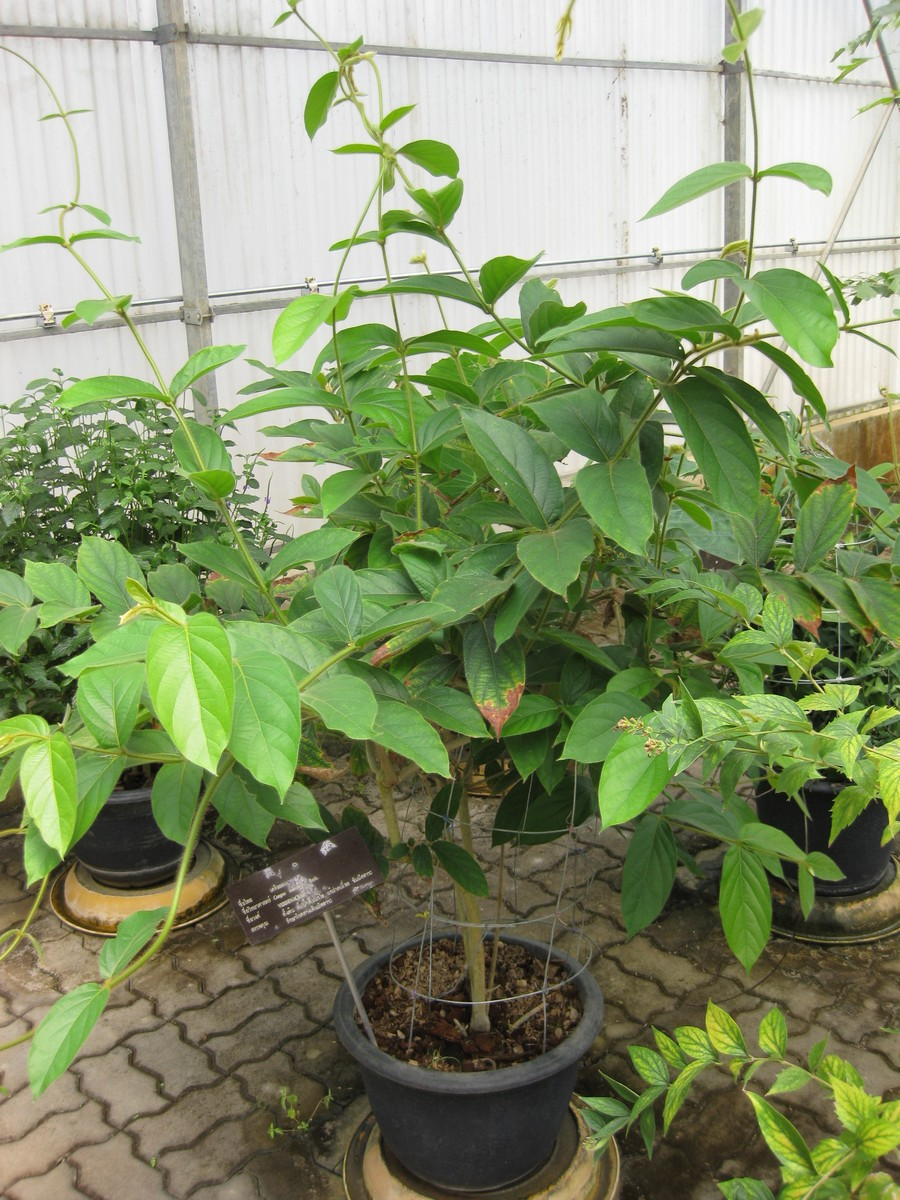

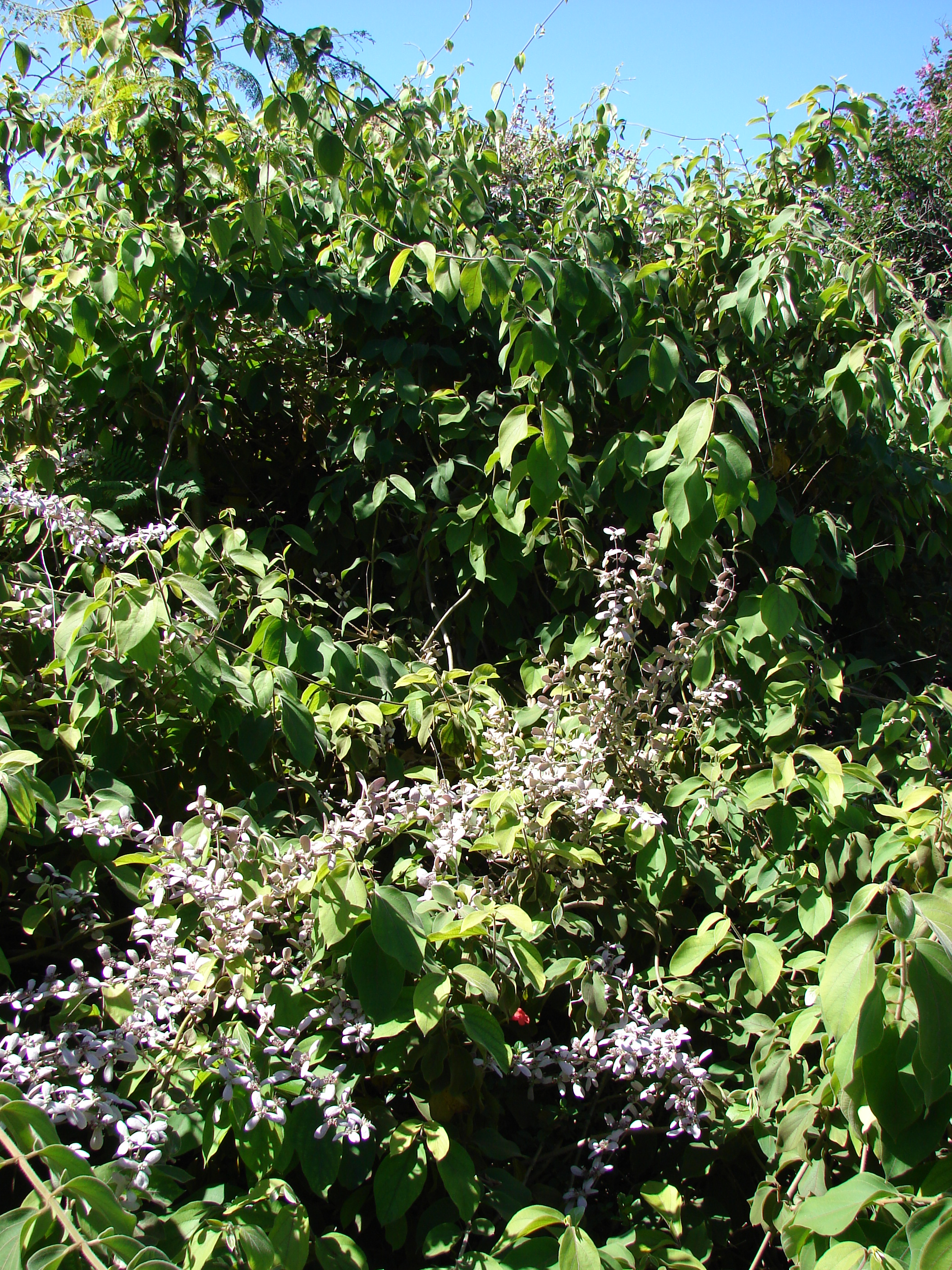

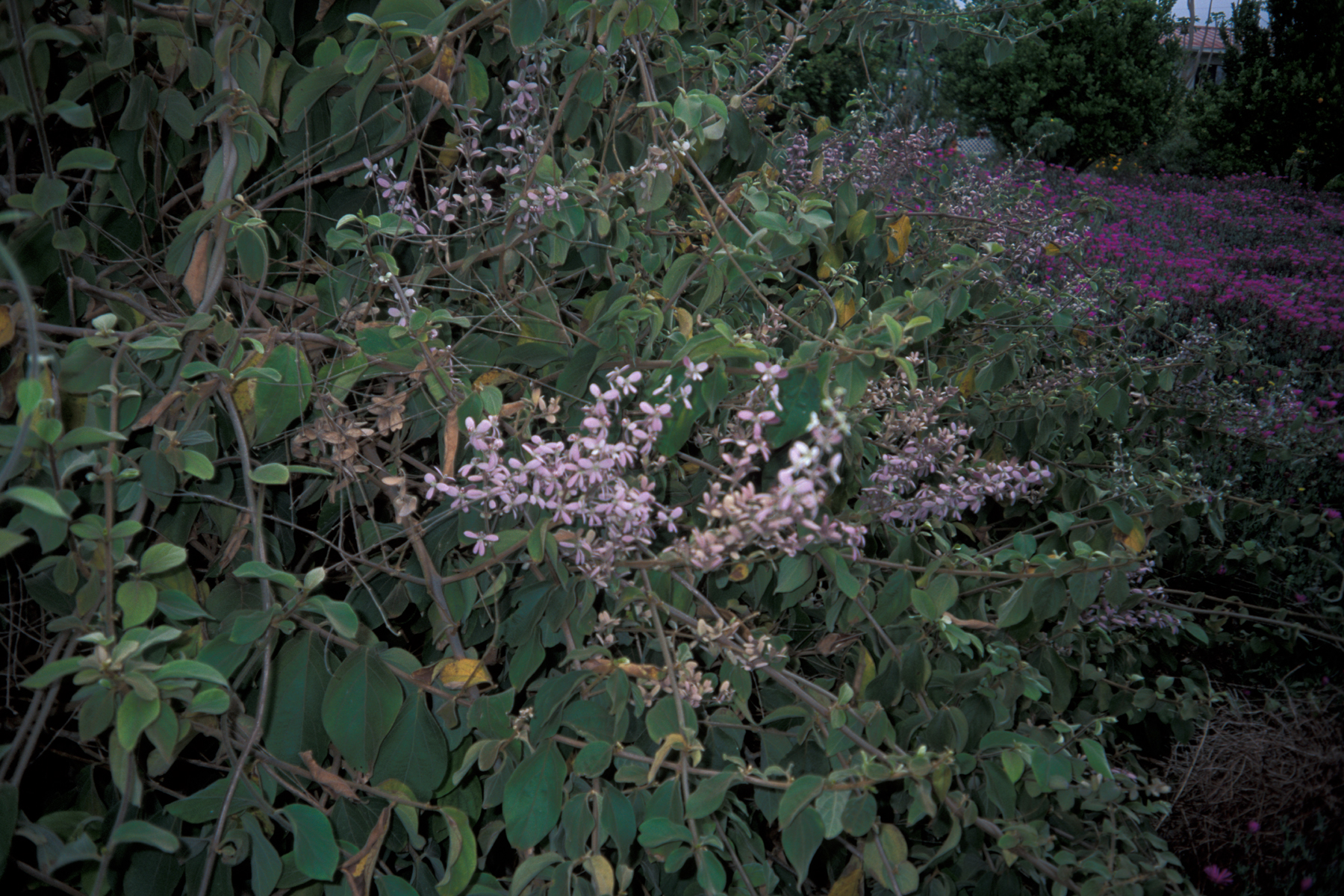

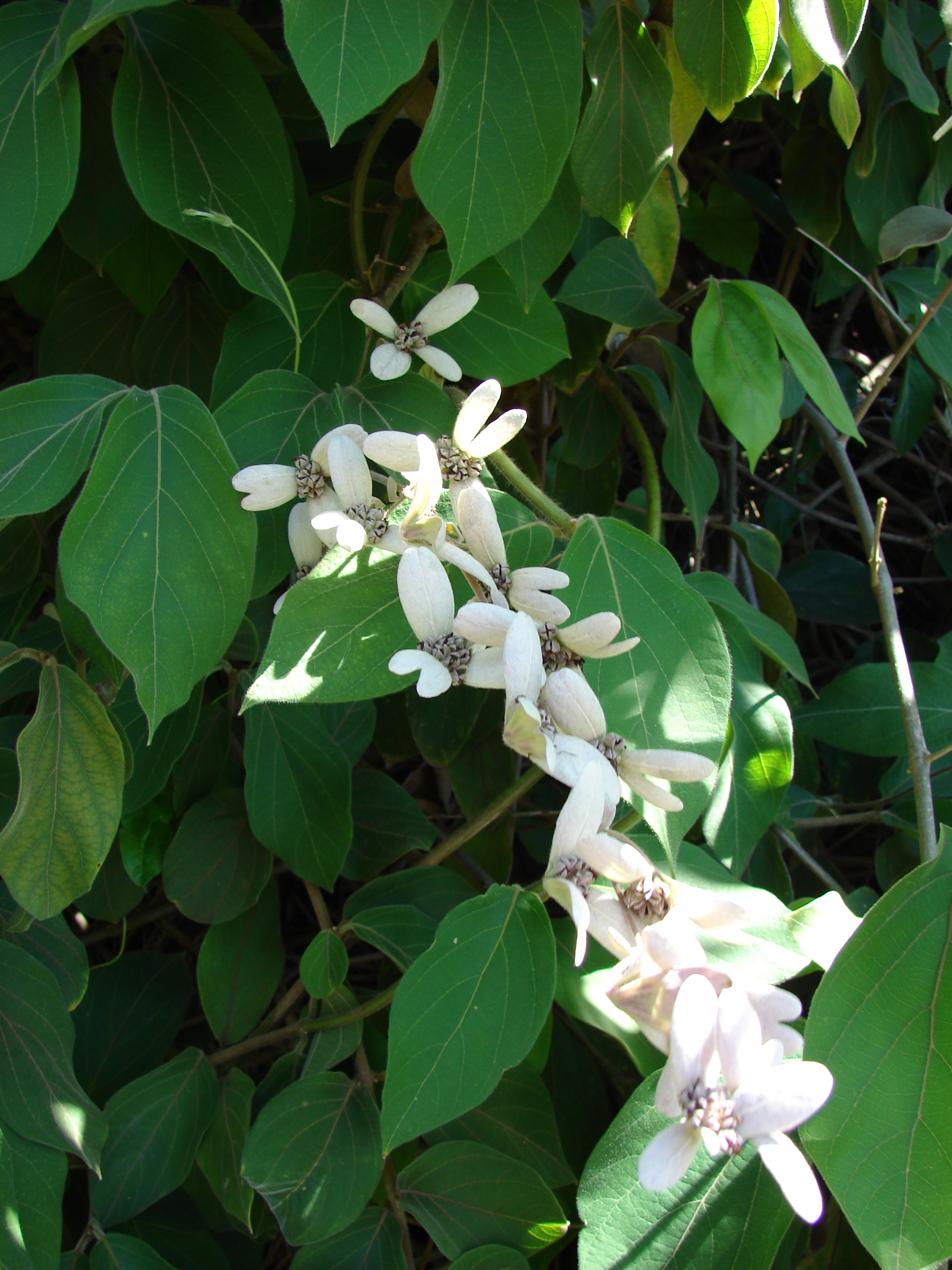
