= Firecracker flower =

The common name firecracker flower may refer to one of the following ornamental plants:

- Crossandra infundibuliformis, native to India and Sri Lanka
- Dichelostemma ida-maia, native to the United States

== See also ==
- Firecracker plant (Russelia)
