= Congea chinensis =

Scientific classification
- Kingdom: Plantae
- Clade: Tracheophytes
- Clade: Angiosperms
- Clade: Eudicots
- Clade: Asterids
- Order: Lamiales
- Family: Lamiaceae
- Genus: Congea
- Species: C. chinensis

Binomial name
- Congea chinensis Moldenke

Species of flowering plant

Congea chinensis is a plant in the family Lamiaceae. In Chinese, it is known as 华绒苞藤 (Pinyin: hua rong bao teng).

It is native to south Yunnan and Myanmar, and is found in mixed forests at 700 to 1500 meter above sea level.

== Botanical description ==
Branchlets densely grayish pilose. Petiole to 7 mm, pilose; leaf blade narrowly elliptic, 8–14.5 X ca. 5 cm, abaxially densely pilose, base subrounded to cordate, margin entire, apex acuminate; veins abaxially prominent, pilose when young. Cymes 5-7-flowered, densely grayish pilose; peduncle 1–2 cm; involucral bracts 4, narrowly oblong, 2.5-3 X 0.5-0.8 cm. Calyx campanulate, 7–8 mm, outside densely white pilose, inside pubescent. Corolla grayish, ca. 7 mm, tube cylindric. Stamens 4, long exserted. Ovary ca. 2 mm, glabrous. Fl. Oct.
