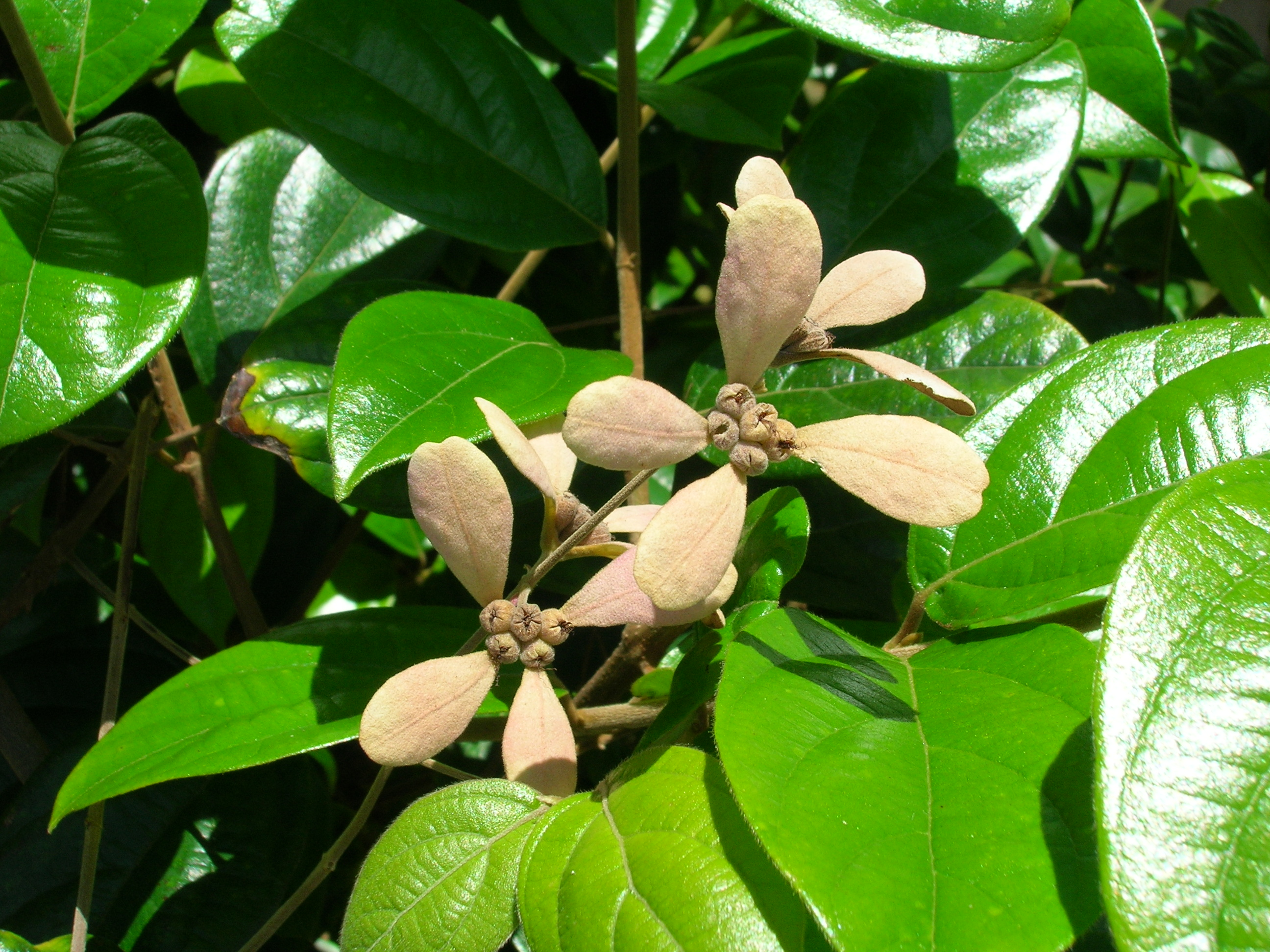
- Congea griffithiana flower
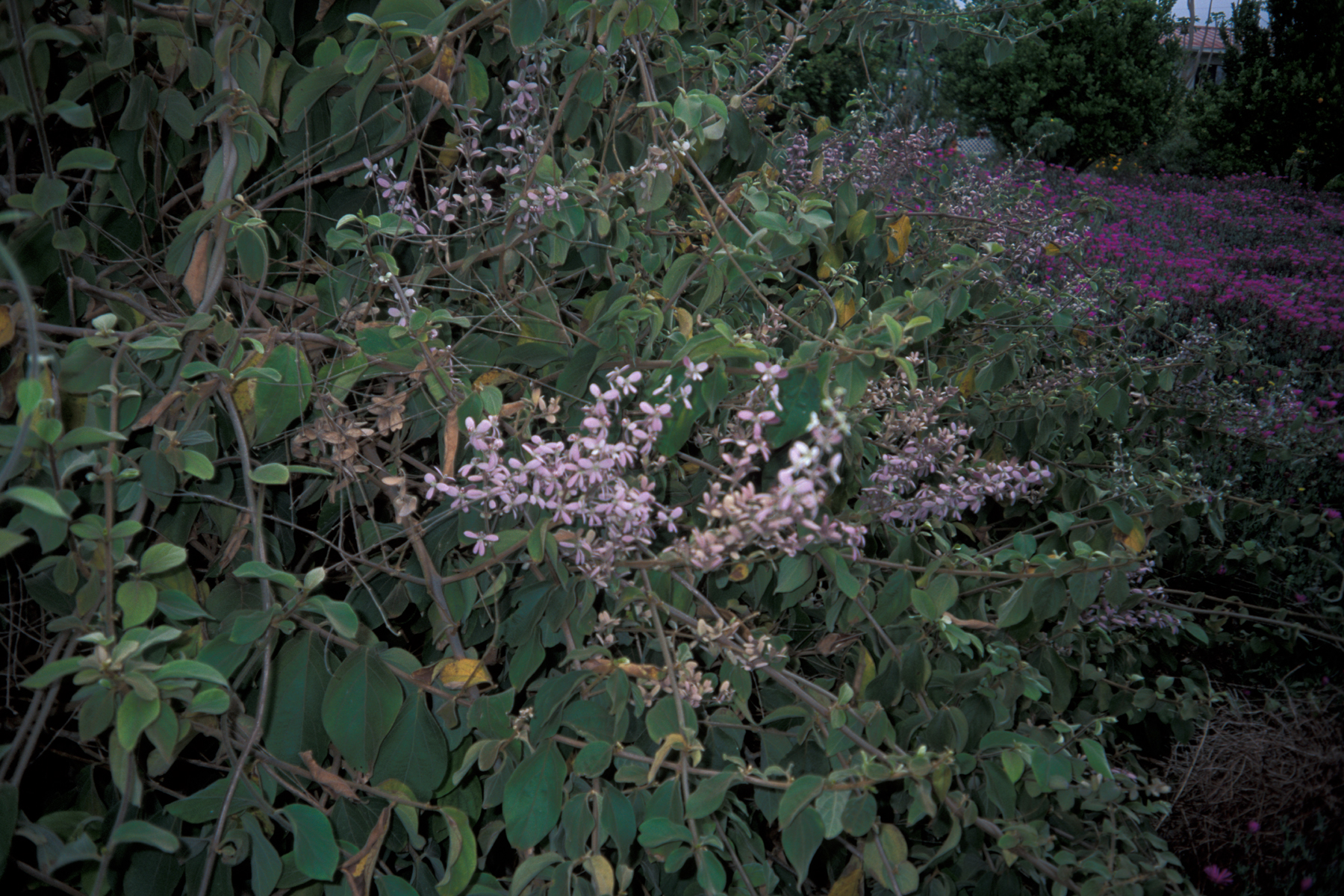
- Congea tomentosa at Enchanting Floral Gardens, Maui, Hawaii

Scientific classification
- Kingdom: Plantae
- Clade: Tracheophytes
- Clade: Angiosperms
- Clade: Eudicots
- Clade: Asterids
- Order: Lamiales
- Family: Lamiaceae
- Subfamily: Symphorematoideae
- Genus: Congea; Roxb., 1820

Synonyms
- Calochlamys C.Presl

= Congea =

Genus of flowering plants

Congea is a small genus of flowering plants in the mint family, Lamiaceae, first described by William Roxburgh in 1820.

It contains vines native to southern China, the Himalayas, and Southeast Asia that are rarely seen in cultivation outside the tropics. One species, Congea tomentosa, is occasionally grown in large greenhouses, but this is mainly restricted to conservatories on large estates or botanic gardens.

Species

1. Congea chinensis Moldenke - Yunnan, Myanmar
2. Congea connata H.R.Fletcher - Thailand
3. Congea forbesii King & Gamble - Malaysia, Sumatra
4. Congea griffithiana Munir - Laos, Thailand, Myanmar, Malaysia; naturalized in Sri Lanka
5. Congea hansenii Moldenke - Thailand
6. Congea × munirii Moldenke - Vietnam (C. chinensis × C. connata)
7. Congea pedicellata Munir - Laos, Thailand, Vietnam; naturalized in Fiji
8. Congea rockii Moldenke - Thailand
9. Congea siamensis H.R.Fletcher - Thailand, Myanmar
10. Congea tomentosa Roxb., commonly called Shower Orchid, Shower of Orchids, or Wooly Congea. - Yunnan, Assam, Bangladesh, Indochina; naturalized in Central America, Colombia, Dominican Republic, Sri Lanka
11. Congea velutina Wight - Thailand, Myanmar, Malaysia, Sumatra
12. Congea vestita Griff. - Indochina
