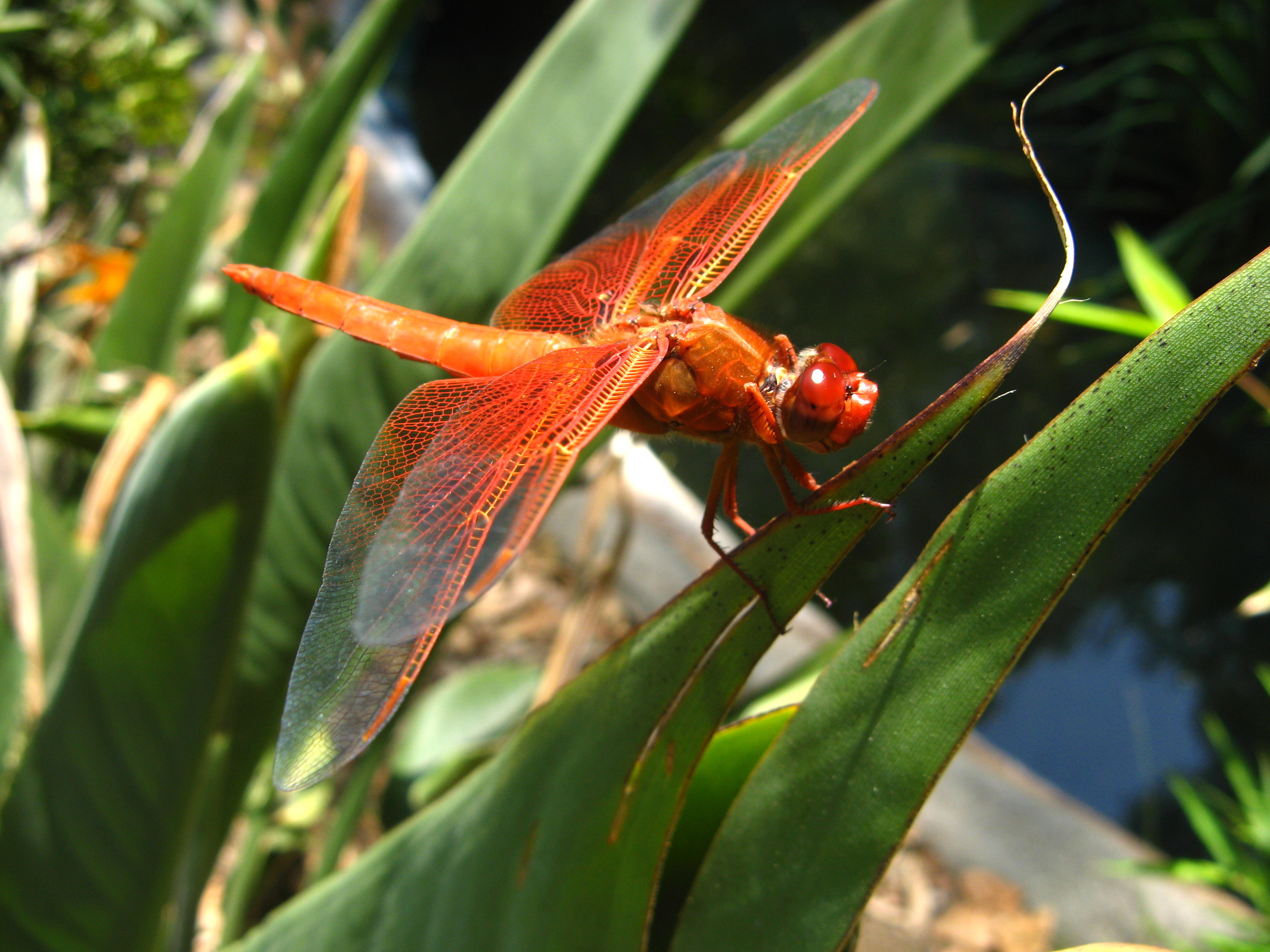
- Male dragonfly

Scientific classification
- Kingdom: Animalia
- Phylum: Arthropoda
- Clade: Pancrustacea
- Class: Insecta
- Order: Odonata
- Infraorder: Anisoptera
- Family: Libellulidae
- Genus: Libellula
- Species: L. saturata

Binomial name
- Libellula saturata Uhler, 1857

= Flame skimmer =

Species of dragonfly

The flame skimmer or firecracker skimmer (Libellula saturata) is a common dragonfly of the family Libellulidae, native to western North America.

== Description ==
Male flame skimmers are known for their entirely red or dark orange body, this includes eyes, legs, and even wing veins. Females are usually a medium or darker brown with some thin, yellow markings. This particular type of skimmer varies in size but is generally measured somewhere between 2 and 3 inches (5.1 and 7.6 cm) long. The naiads are known for being rather large and chubby-looking due to their rounded abdomen. They are covered with hair but, unlike most young dragonflies, they lack hooks or spines.

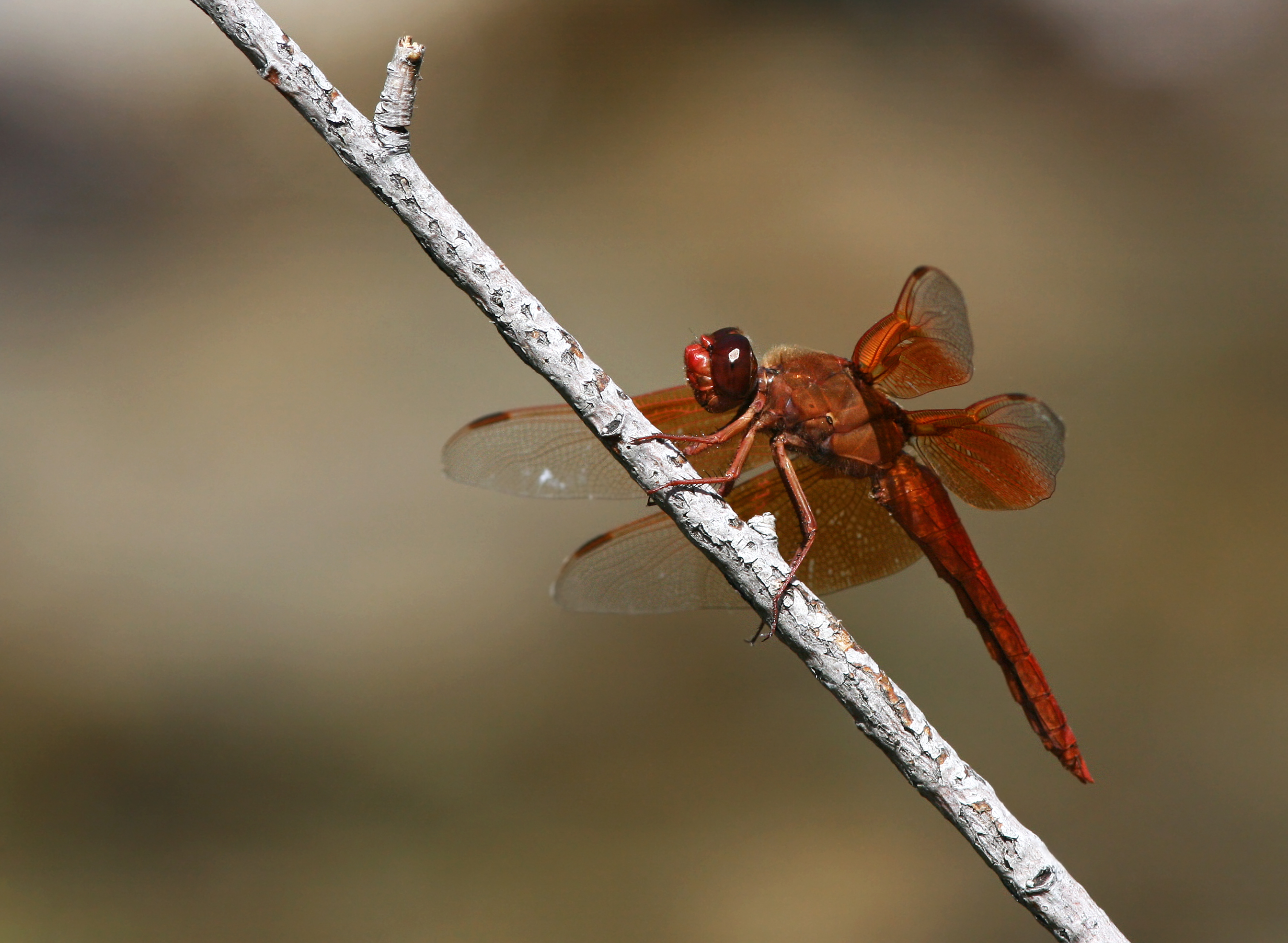
side view

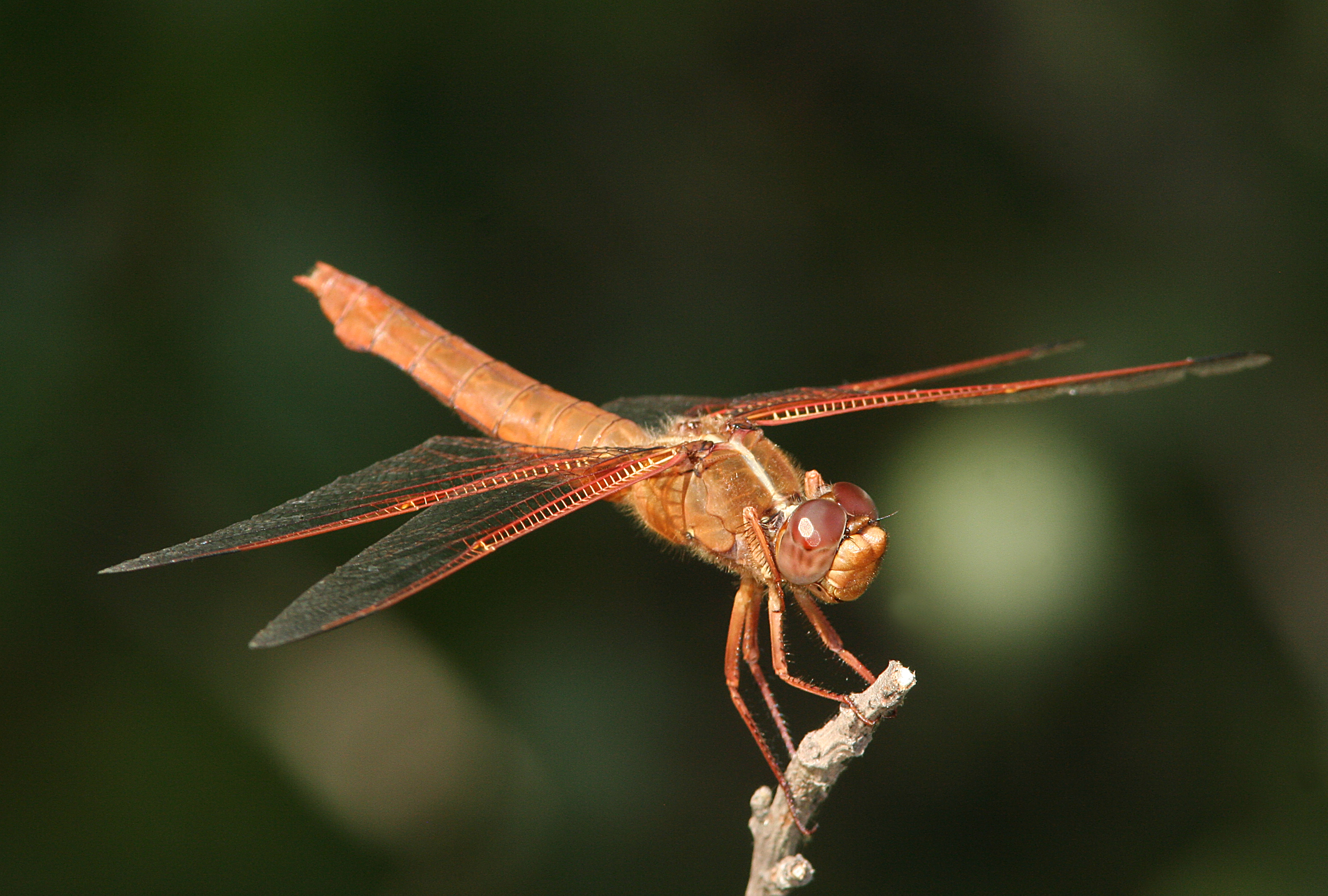
side view female

== Location ==
Due to its choice habitat of warm ponds, streams, or hot springs, flame skimmers are found mainly in the southwestern part of the United States. They also make their homes in public gardens or backyards.

== Feeding habits ==
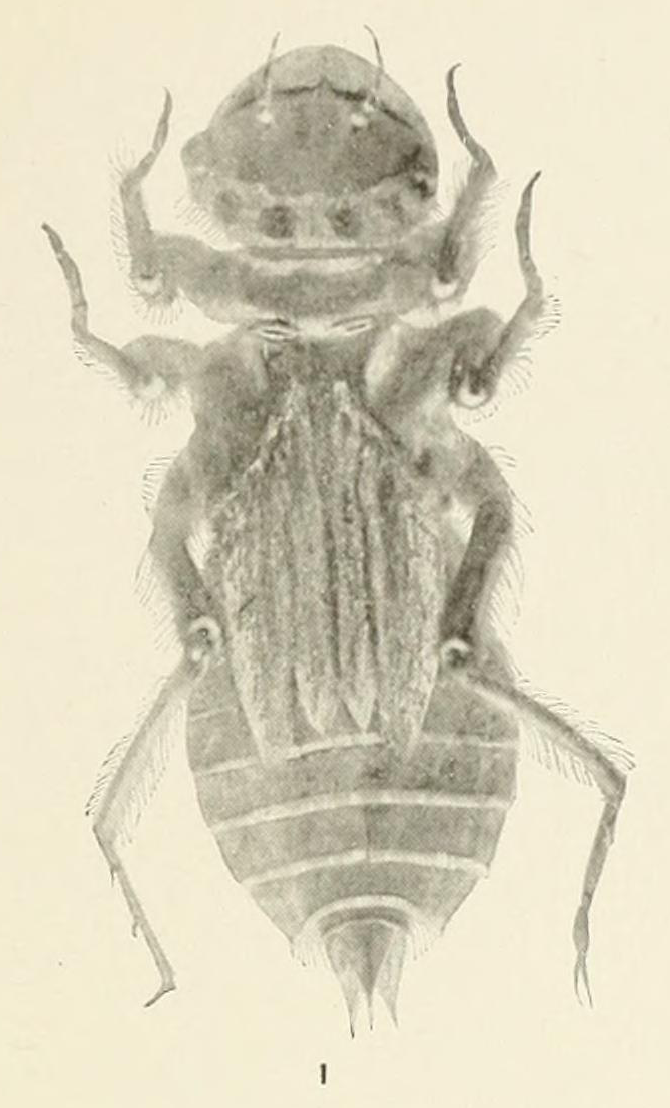
Nymph of Libellula saturata from California.

An immature flame skimmer (nymph) feeds mainly on aquatic insects. Its diet consists of mosquito larvae, aquatic fly larvae, mayfly larvae, freshwater shrimp, small fish, and tadpoles. The nymphs, which live in the mud at the bottom of warm streams or ponds, catch their prey by waiting patiently for it to pass by. Adult skimmers usually feed on moths, flies, ants, or any other soft-bodied insect while waiting perched on a small rock or twig or while flying through the air.

== Reproduction ==
Breeding for flame skimmers occurs during their flight season from May to September. Males compete with other males for prime breeding locations and females. After mating, the male and female separate, and the female flies off alone to lay her eggs. She does this by hovering above small streams or ponds and dipping the end of her abdomen into the water. Often she deposits her eggs in many different places in order to prevent the naiads from using each other as a source of food.

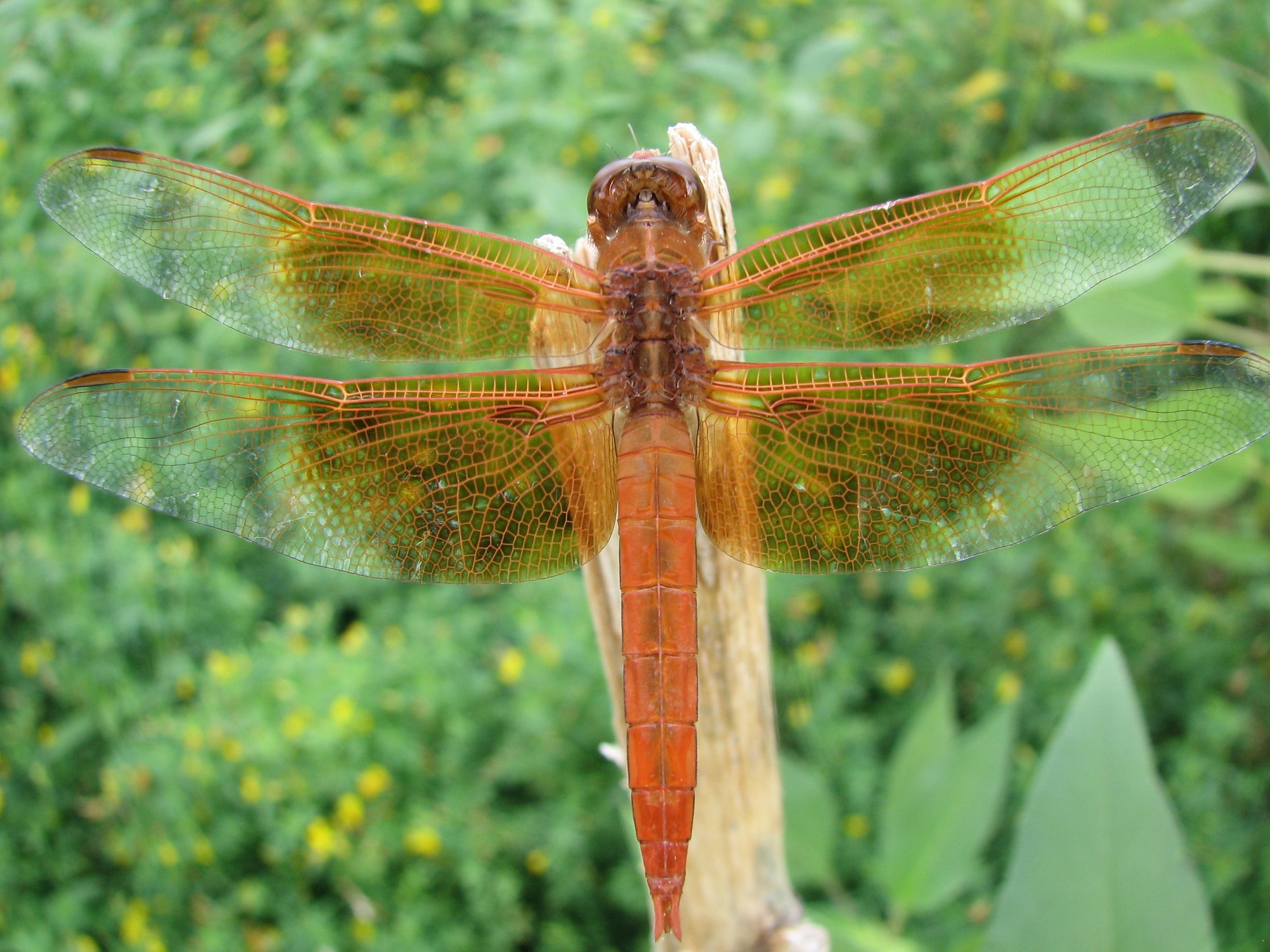
Male flame skimmer
