= Driftwood Inn and Restaurant =

- U.S. National Register of Historic Places
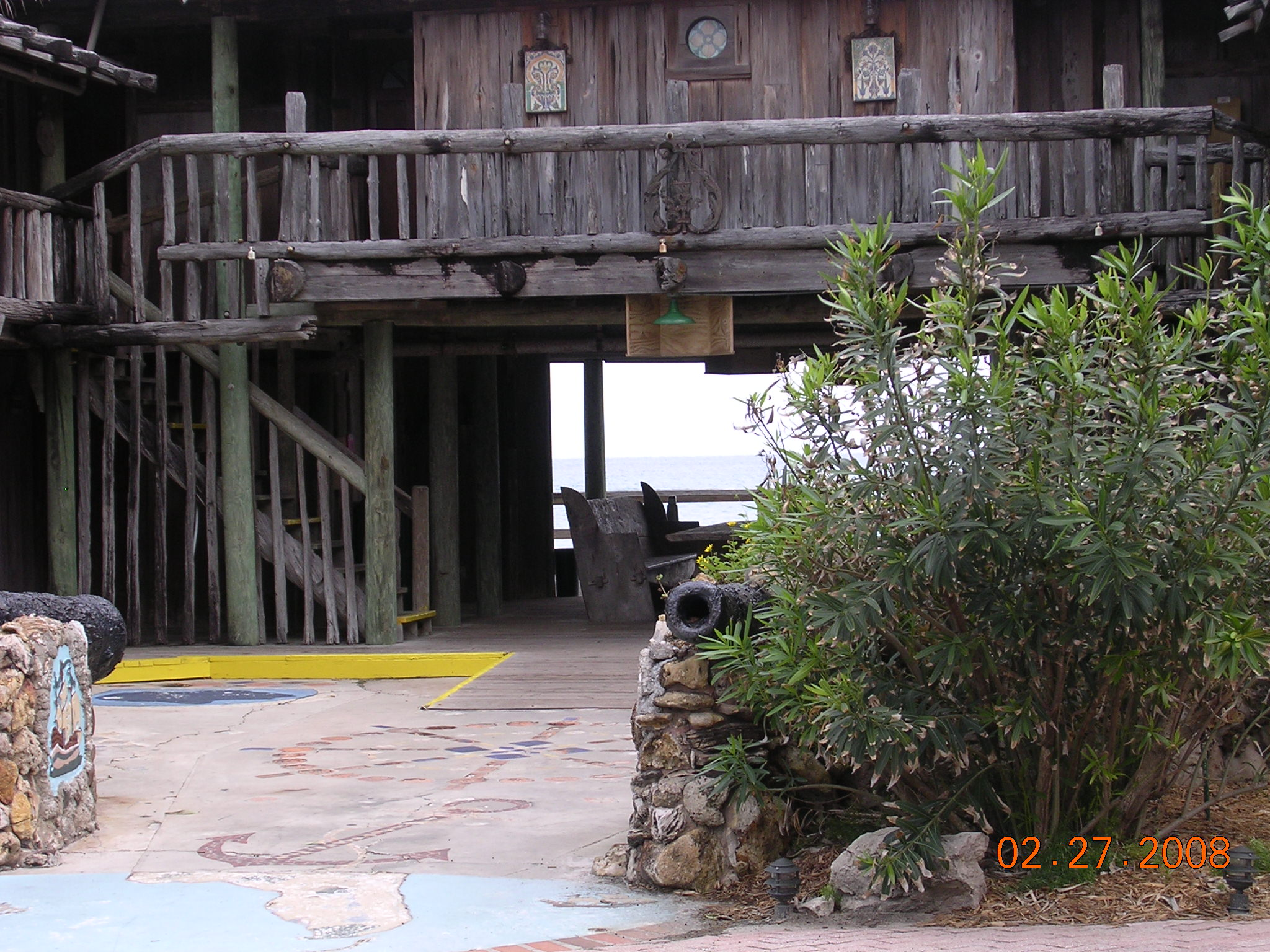
- Interactive map of Driftwood Inn and Restaurant
- Location: Vero Beach, Florida
- Coordinates: 27°39′3″N 80°21′19″W
- Architect: Waldo E. Sexton
- Architectural style: Frame Vernacular
- NRHP reference No.: 94000751
- Added to NRHP: August 6, 1994

The Driftwood Inn and Restaurant (also known as The Breezeway) is a historic site in Vero Beach, Florida. It is located at 3150 Ocean Drive. On August 6, 1994, it was added to the U.S. National Register of Historic Places. The Driftwood Inn was opened in 1937, conceived and constructed by local Vero Beach eccentric and businessman Waldo E. Sexton. The hotel and resort were continually expanded throughout the years, and the property is now a partial interval ownership/timeshare along with being a traditional hotel.

== History ==
Waldo E. Sexton (1885–1967) built the two buildings which comprise the Driftwood Inn and Restaurant in 1935. Waldo has been called “one of the most colorful persons that Florida has ever known,” an “imaginative entrepreneur,” and an “outrageous, old time eccentric.” He moved to Florida in 1914 and began his legacy that includes several buildings still standing in Vero Beach today and was an integral partner in the development of McKee Jungle Garden, also in Vero Beach. The Driftwood Inn and Restaurant was originally a private beach house called the “Breezeway” by its owners, Waldo & Elsebeth Sexton, because of the opening in the central portion of the first floor. Construction of the house began in about 1935 and was completed in 1937. Two rooms originally flanked the first floor. A kitchen was located on the second floor, over the breezeway. A balcony extended across the second floor. Brick chimneys also flanked the breezeway. According to family members, a coiled pipe, “solar unit” was contained between the chimneys to provide heated water, and in fact original pictures in the reception area of the Inn today show those solar panels. The original beach house was expanded in late 1937 by the addition of a wing on the north and the south wing was added in 1939. The original portion of the building is now the central section.

Though originally built as a family home, within a short time it was being operated by Mrs. Waldo Sexton as a small resort hotel. Because there was no restaurant in the vicinity of the Driftwood Inn, Mrs. Sexton began to cook breakfast for the guests in the family kitchen. This success led eventually to the founding of the adjacent restaurant, Waldo's Restaurant, which was constructed in 1947. The main entrance to the restaurant is recessed and located adjacent to the breezeway building. The doors have multiple panels, insets and decorative ceramic tiles. Ornate metal grills also decorate the entrance area. The balcony is railed with turned spindles, part of the original design. Three immense "outrigger" type wood timbers decorate the south end of the building. The restaurant interior still retains some original features, such as wood paneled walls and ceramic tile insets in the floor. Today, both the Breezeway and Waldo's Restaurant maintain their basic integrity, their unusual workmanship and materials, and their original design features. They are a unique example of vernacular architecture in which Waldo was able to express his exuberant personality. Waldo was a world traveler and a passionate collector. He incorporated hundreds of artifacts that he obtained from various trips into the buildings and grounds of the inn and restaurant. The visual display of these items was the exuberant Waldo's way of sharing his collection of the beautiful and unusual. Part of the timber used to build the Driftwood was salvaged by Waldo from a barn blown down in a hurricane. Waldo was especially fond of bells and amassed a collection of 250 of various types and sizes, collecting them from churches, trains, ships and schools, just to mention a few. They dominate the exterior of the buildings and have always been a special part of the Driftwood Inn tradition. They were used to welcome guests on their arrival and to ring out a farewell on their departure.

Waldo continued to expand the Driftwood complex after erecting the inn and restaurant. A small office was built in 1949. In that year, he also moved in a row of fishing shacks that were used for guest rooms, and later, for small shops. They were converted back into guests rooms in 1986. In 1963, a 15 unit apartment building was added just west of the original Breezeway building. Waldo's son, Ralph, erected the four-story building to the south in 1965, providing more apartment units. Two more apartment buildings are now part of the Driftwood Resort, and all apartments and guests rooms on the property were converted to interval ownership in 1979.

== Features ==
The building is distinguished by board and batten exterior walls, wood shingled gable ends with decorative truss work and rustic balcony railings. The courtyard is marked by two stone walls, into which are embedded two rusty, ancient cannons. Ceramic tiles decorate the courtyard floor. A breezeway is at the east end of the courtyard and is flanked by stairs leading to the second floor. The hallway at the north end features a small mural of a Spanish explorer landing in the new world. The breezeway walls feature graffiti from visitors, applied ornaments and portions of a wood mantel.

The Driftwood Inn and Waldo's Restaurant feature a rustic “beachcomber” ambiance. While structures of similar style may be found elsewhere in Florida, few are comparable in scale or complexity of detail The two original buildings are unique in the Vero Beach area and continue to serve their historic function of providing accommodations and amenities for tourists. Both were added to the U.S. National Register of Historic Places in 1994. The inn and restaurant continue to operate today, renting rooms to the public on a daily or weekly basis and serving lunch and dinner poolside and Oceanside from Waldo's Restaurant.

== Hurricane damage ==
Two hurricanes in 2004 did substantial damage to the property, but it reopened in 2005 and retained all the history and ambiance it has always had. With the help of local architect John Dean and longtime property manager Jeanne Radlet, the buildings were restored and stand today as a testament to Waldo Sexton, the entrepreneur and eclectic individual that built these structures nearly a century ago.
