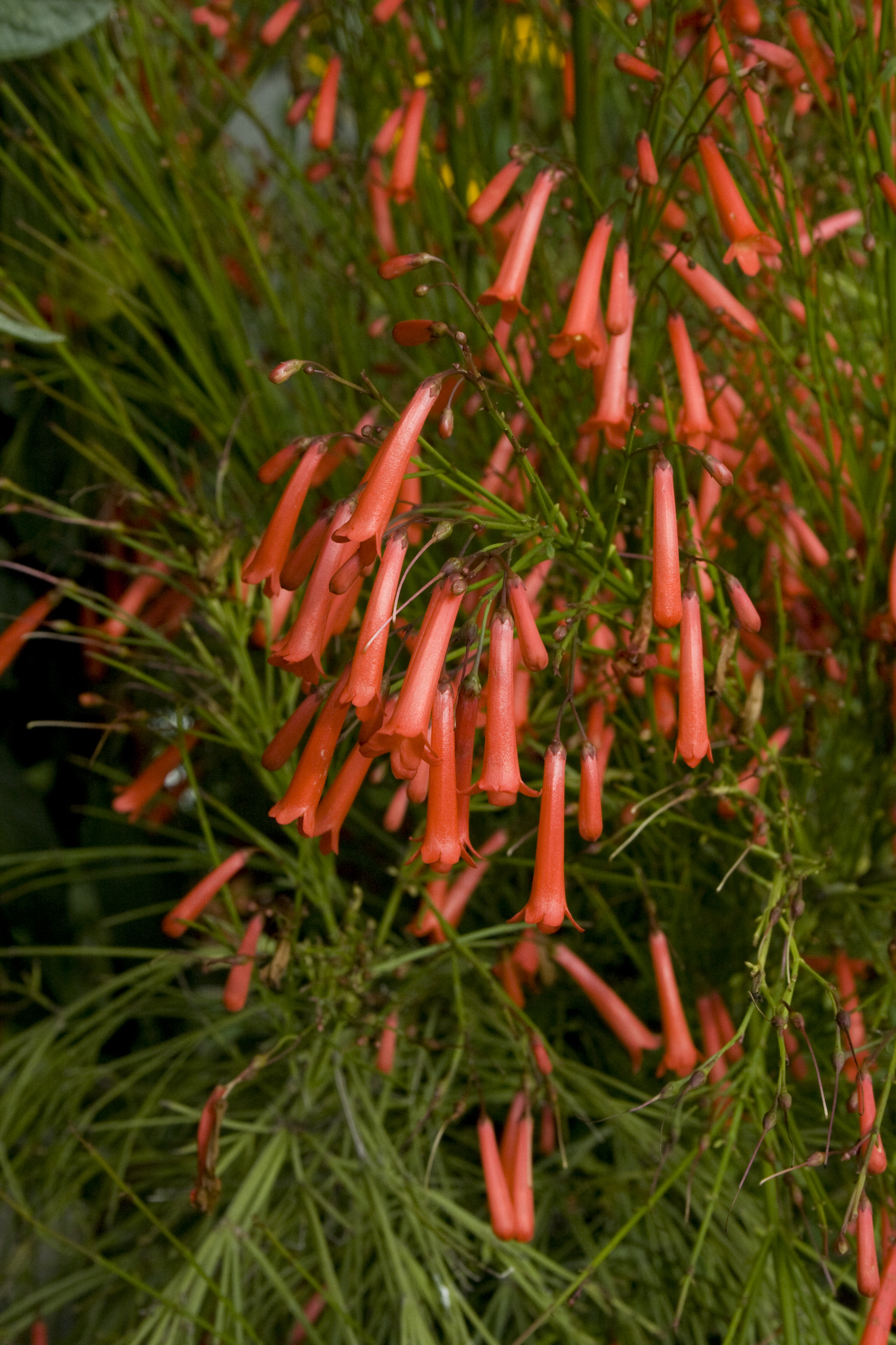

Scientific classification
- Kingdom: Plantae
- Clade: Tracheophytes
- Clade: Angiosperms
- Clade: Eudicots
- Clade: Asterids
- Order: Lamiales
- Family: Plantaginaceae
- Genus: Russelia
- Species: R. equisetiformis

Binomial name
- Russelia equisetiformis Schltdl. & Cham.

Synonyms
- Russelia juncea (Zucc.)

= Russelia equisetiformis =

Species of flowering plant

Russelia equisetiformis, the fountainbush, firecracker plant, coral plant, coral fountain, coralblow, ruby falls or fountain plant, is a species of flowering plant in the family Plantaginaceae.

This weeping subshrub is native to Mexico and Guatemala.

The Latin specific epithet equisetiformis implies the plant has a form "like/similar to Equisetum"—i.e., 'horsetail', 'horsetail rush/fern'—a genus which Russelia is only distantly related to (and which is not a true fern genera).

== Description ==
Russelia equisetiformis is a multi-branching plant with thin leaves and arching foliage that measure around 4–5 feet (1.2–1.5 m). The overall graceful form of the subshrub is a fountainesque mound. The stems and tiny oval leaves are bright green. It flowers profusely, with small, decumbent red flowers, earning the plant the common name 'firecracker fern' as it gives the impression of a bush set ablaze. It can bloom year-round in tropical and subtropical climates, such as USDA Hardiness zones 9-10, and above.

R. equisetiformis is favoured by nectar-feeding birds & insects, due in-part to the trumpet-like, rather long flowers. Hummingbirds are especially drawn to Russelia.

== Cultivation ==
Russelia equisetiformis is cultivated as an ornamental plant, for subtropical & temperate gardens. In tropical locations, it is recommended to be used as feature pots or hanging planters as it can become unruly in garden settings. Various colours exist ranging from white, yellow, pale orange & shades of red. Optimal conditions for flowering is a minimum of 4 hours of sunlight. The firecracker plant is capable of growing in a diverse range of settings, from desert to rain forest.

This species is best grown as a sprawling bordering or cascading groundcover where it accentuates its natural tufting rush-like habit. It is equality suitable in a container (pot) as a feature. Russelia equisetiformis is especially attractive when grown in a basket, a hanging container, or otherwise cascading downwards, giving an appearance of cascading jungle cacti (like Hatiora or Rhipsalis) or the thin-leaved Hoya species Hoya linearis. Once established, R. equisetiformis is moderately drought tolerant. In temperate climates, the species is known to be semi-deciduous. The genus is reported to withstand temperatures down to −6 °C (21 °F); still other authorities assert that it cannot tolerate temperatures below 5 °C (41 °F), nor can it handle frost, and therefore should be kept under glass or protected during the coldest months. In colder climates, it can overwinter as a houseplant with access to direct sunlight or intense artificial lighting.

In the UK, Russelia equisetiformis has earned the Royal Horticultural Society (RHS)'s Award of Garden Merit.

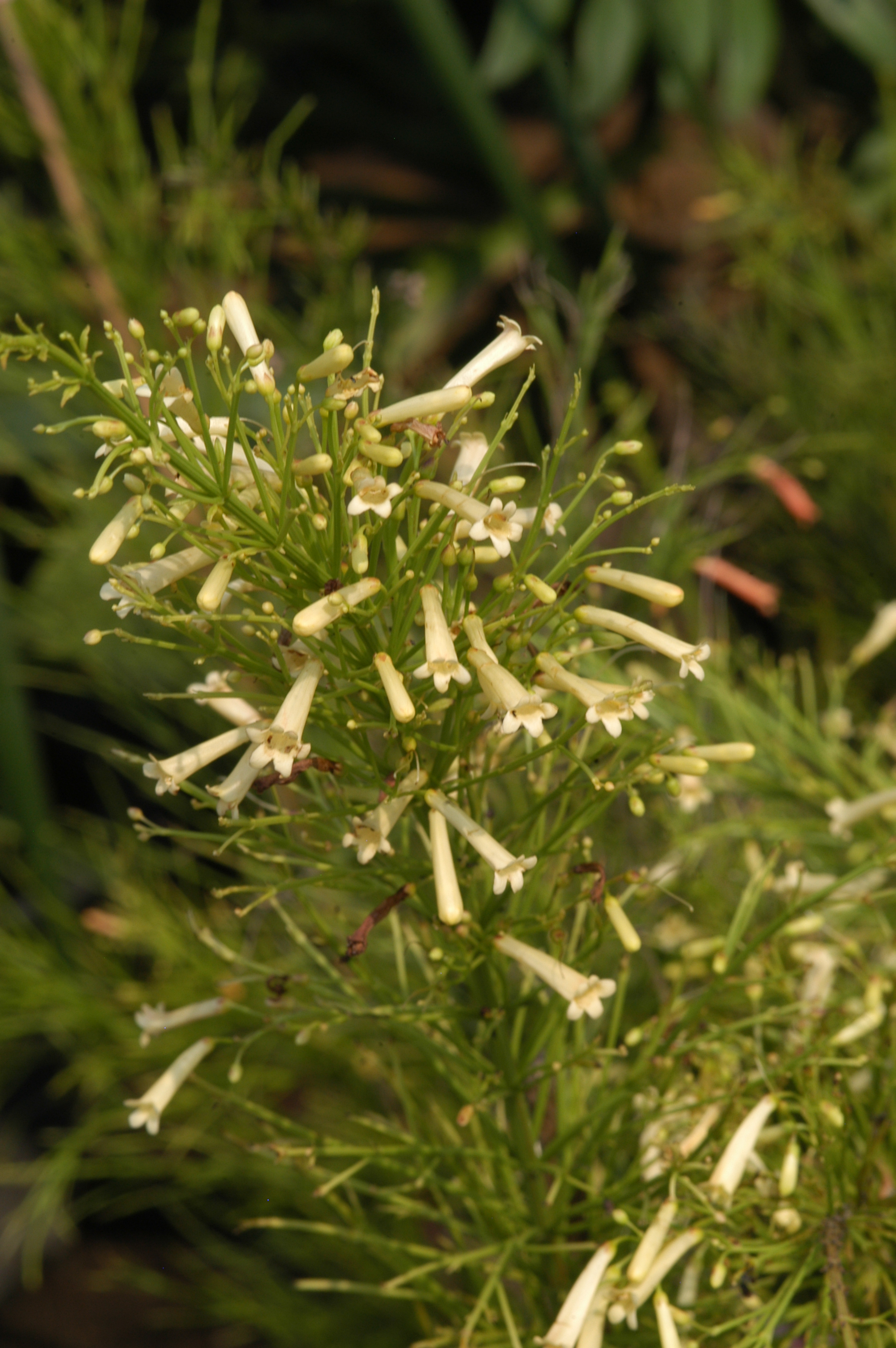

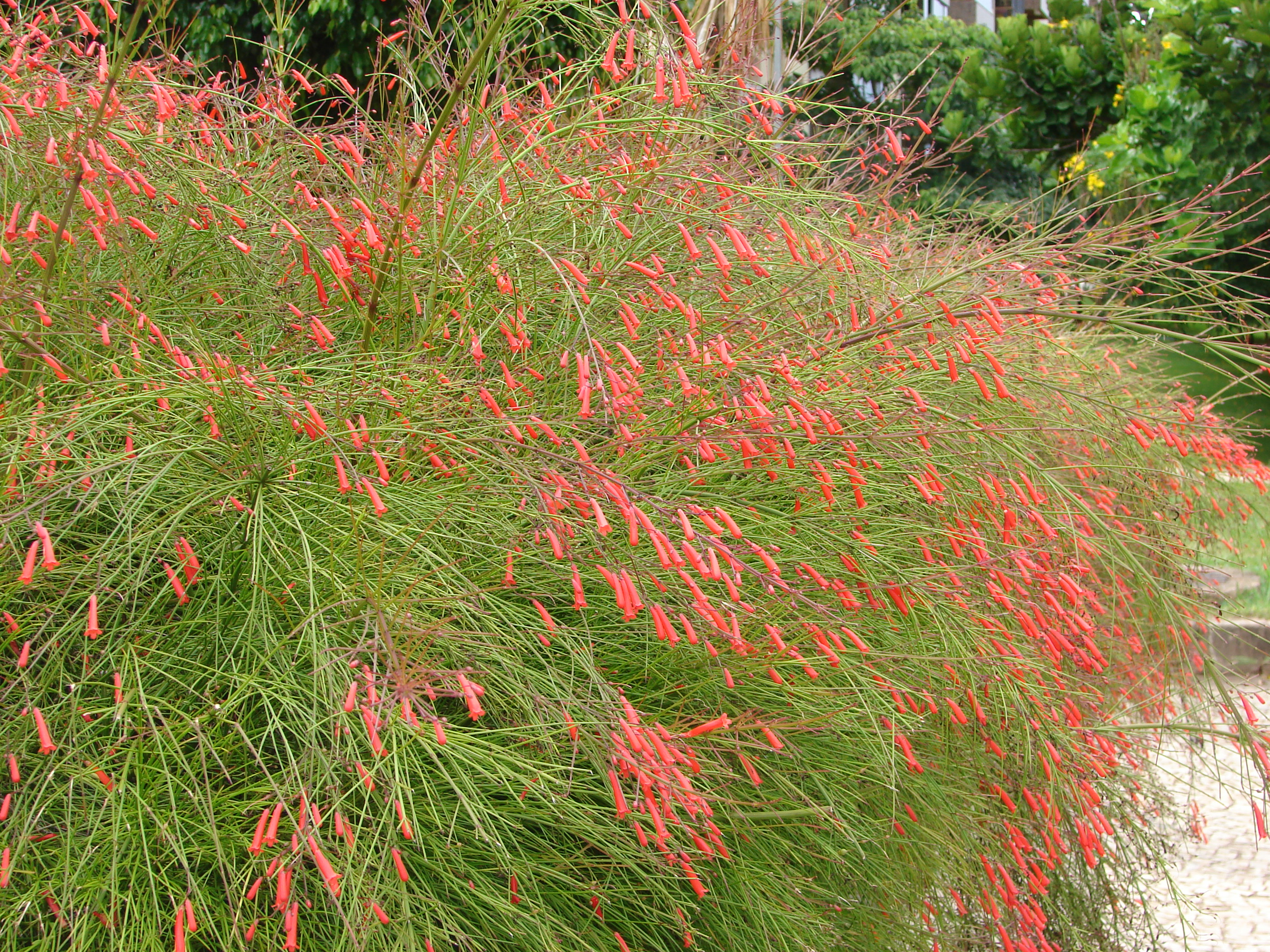

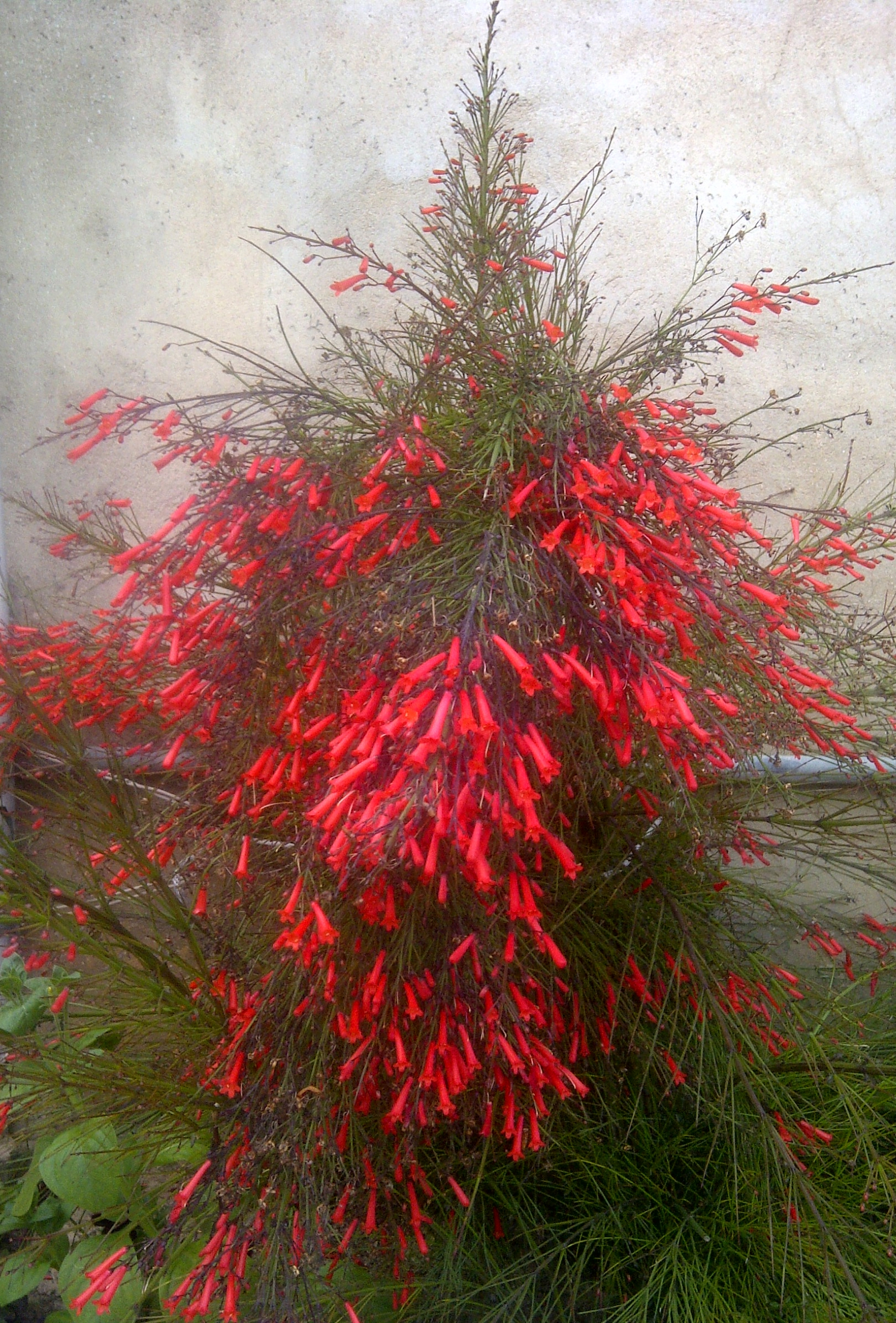
