= Waldo E. Sexton =

American architect

Waldo Emmerson Sexton
- Born: March 23, 1885; Shelbyville, Indiana, United States
- Died: December 28, 1967 (aged 82); Vero Beach, Florida, United States
- Education: Shelbyville High School; Purdue University
- Known for: Driftwood Inn and Restaurant; Hall of Giants; McKee Botanical Garden; Ocean Grill; Turf Club; Waldo's Mountain (demolished); The Patio Restaurant; Sczechuan Palace
- Parent(s): Isaac Sexton; Sarah Ann Buckingham

Waldo Emmerson Sexton (23 March 1885 – 28 December 1967) was an entrepreneur whose enterprises have attracted visitors to Vero Beach, Florida, since the 1930s and remain of value to the community, industry, tourists, artists, historians and horticulturalists. He was named to the list of Great Floridians by the Florida Department of State for his agricultural contributions.

== Biography ==
=== Early life ===
Waldo E. Sexton was born in Shelbyville, Indiana, to Isaac Sexton and Sarah Ann Buckingham. He was the youngest male out of the couple's five children. He was the first man from Morrow Township to attend high school, which he did in the county seat of Shelbyville, Indiana at Shelbyville High School.

After initially attending Indiana University (in Bloomington, Indiana) for medicine, Sexton decided becoming a physician was not for him after his first attempt at performing an autopsy on a cadaver. He transferred to Purdue University's College of Agriculture, where he met John Wheeler. He was initiated into the Indiana Alpha chapter of the fraternity Phi Delta Theta on September 28, 1906. During college, Sexton sold aluminum cooking utensils and later collected commission off of the sales of the men he recruited, including his first cousin Walter Buckingham in 1909. Additionally he worked for the university's extension department during the summers and put himself through school. He also made money by purchasing fraternity pins from local pawn shops and selling them to fraternity members on campus.

After he graduated in 1911, Sexton moved east to Barberton, Ohio, and was briefly involved in the rubber industry. Sexton later moved to Cleveland, Ohio, and began working as a traveling salesman for an agricultural tillage equipment supplier, where he met Pittsburgh native and attorney Charles "Charlie" H McKee who was financing the company. In 1913 the family suffered a loss when his brother William Avery Sexton, a city police officer in Columbus Ohio, drowned while assisting the town during the infamous tragic March 13th flood of their Great Flood of 1913.

=== Agriculture ===
His work as a deep tillage machine salesman brought him to the area that would eventually be known as Vero Beach, Florida, in 1914 to perform a demonstration on a local farm. Due to a late arriving expense check from his company, he stayed a few extra days at the Sleepy Eye Lodge which gave him time to get to know the area. He decided to buy a forty-acre tract of land and proceeded to buy the two neighboring 40-acre tracts during the following days. With $500 left in his pocket and at the advice of Dr. Leroy Hutchinson, Sexton limited his initial investment to 120 acres.

That year he took a sales agent position with the Indian River Farms Company. The company was working on excavating the drainage system that drained the wetlands of the area and created prime agricultural land. Sexton was charged with the company's Cleveland, Ohio based office and organized numerous prospect trips via rail car from Cincinnati, Ohio to the area. During this time, Charles H McKee stopped by the area on his way to his Palm Beach honeymoon. He and his wife, Clara, stayed at the Sleepy Eye Lodge where he met Sexton. Before leaving, Charles purchased 1000 acres of land. When he died the following year, his cousin and Cleveland engineer Arthur McKee bought out his holdings.

Considered an independent citrus grower by 1917 for having planted 10,000 trees, he went on to marry Elsebeth Martens the following year in 1918. His citrus related activities included operating a grove maintenance company, a cooperative packinghouse, and founding the Indian River Citrus League. He also started a cattle ranch, dairy farm, and insurance agency and developed three varieties of avocados. That same year, he and business partner Arthur G. McKee purchased 80 acres of hammock land along the Indian River Lagoon that would eventually become the McKee Jungle Garden. The land was initially purchased in an attempt to save the area from development into residential or citrus groves as well as to explore their own collection of rare flora and fauna and test the commercial validity of various plants including ramie and rubber trees.

He started the Oslo Packing Company with his first cousin Walter Buckingham. The company incorporated in 1920 with Sexton as president and Buckingham as secretary and treasurer.

=== Tourism and architecture ===
Sexton's first venture in tourist attractions was the McKee Jungle Gardens, developed on 80 acres (320,000 m^{2}) purchased for planting citrus groves with his business partner, Arthur G. McKee. They decided the landscape was too beautiful to plow under. Operating from 1931 to 1976, the Gardens attracted crowds of 100,000 a year in its prime. In 1932, a reviewer who had toured tropical botanical gardens around the world, including the Royal Botanic Gardens, Peradeniya in Ceylon, said he approached his visit "with that secret doubt we conceal before our friends' local enthusiasm. This doubt, however, was quickly resolved." The collection of rare tropical plants framed by native Florida oaks and palms "set an example for conservation and intelligent use of indigenous growth." Landscape architect William Lyman Phillips designed "the exquisite series of waterways and landscapes, including the Cathedral of Palms, 300 royal palms set on a grid. David Fairchild, a friend of Sexton, supplied many exotic plants for this project as well as his own private garden in Miami, The Kampong, now part of the National Tropical Botanical Garden.

In addition to thousands of orchids and lilies, the Mckee Jungle Gardens featured monkeys, alligators, bathing beauties and " the wacky buildings and collections of Waldo E. Sexton, the folk architect and Florida nurseryman. Without an architect or plans, Sexton built and decorated the Hall of Giants and the Spanish Kitchen with cypress milled in Florida, salvaged materials and his bell collection. For the Hall of Giants he located a massive mahogany board 35 feet (11 m) long he had seen at the Louisiana Purchase Exposition in 1904 and turned it into a table. The large iron gates came from the demolished Whitehall Hotel in Palm Beach. The Gardens closed in 1976 but reopened on 18 of the original acres as the McKee Botanical Garden in 2001 and is on United States National Register of Historic Places.

Sexton continued creating unusual structures that became local landmarks and attractions. His penchant for wood, wrought iron, tile and collectibles, can still be viewed at his later enterprises in Vero Beach, including the Driftwood Inn and Restaurant, the Ocean Grill, and the Patio restaurant. Although he bought from many sources and sometimes sight unseen by the truckload through contacts, recognizable pieces from Addison Mizner designed Spanish style mansions in Palm Beach continue to attract new visitors. A 2007 article in the Palm Beach News said "...Mizner would no doubt immediately acknowledge the life's work of his kindred spirit and friend, Waldo Sexton, the man who saved what might have been lost forever and who shared his respect for the past and prescience of history's enduring commercial value." The Driftwood Inn is on the U.S. National Register of Historic Places.

One journalist described the businessman and artist who created such unusual attractions: "Sexton was a man who was not afraid to render an opinion and who never hesitated to embroider a story. He loved martinis and women, bells and thing from the sea, and he possessed a compelling urge to create. Some people called him an irresponsible screwball, an untruth he shrewdly did not deny, knowing that the world loves an eccentric."

== Legacy and honors ==
- Sexton Plaza in Vero Beach, Florida, is named for him.
- Honored for outstanding citizenship in Indian River County with "Waldo Sexton Day" in Vero Beach on 1958.
- Received the Indian River Chapter of American Institute of Architects "1992–1993 Ambiance Award" honoring Waldo's Breezeway, Ocean Grill Restaurant, Patio Restaurant, and Turf Club.
- Driftwood Inn added to the National Registry of Historical Places on August 6, 1994.
- McKee Jungle Gardens added to the National Registry of Historical Places on January 7, 1998.
- Honored in play written and performed by staff at Indian River Charter High School about his contact with African American Poet and Author Zora Neale Hurston in November 2017, January 2018, and January 2019.
