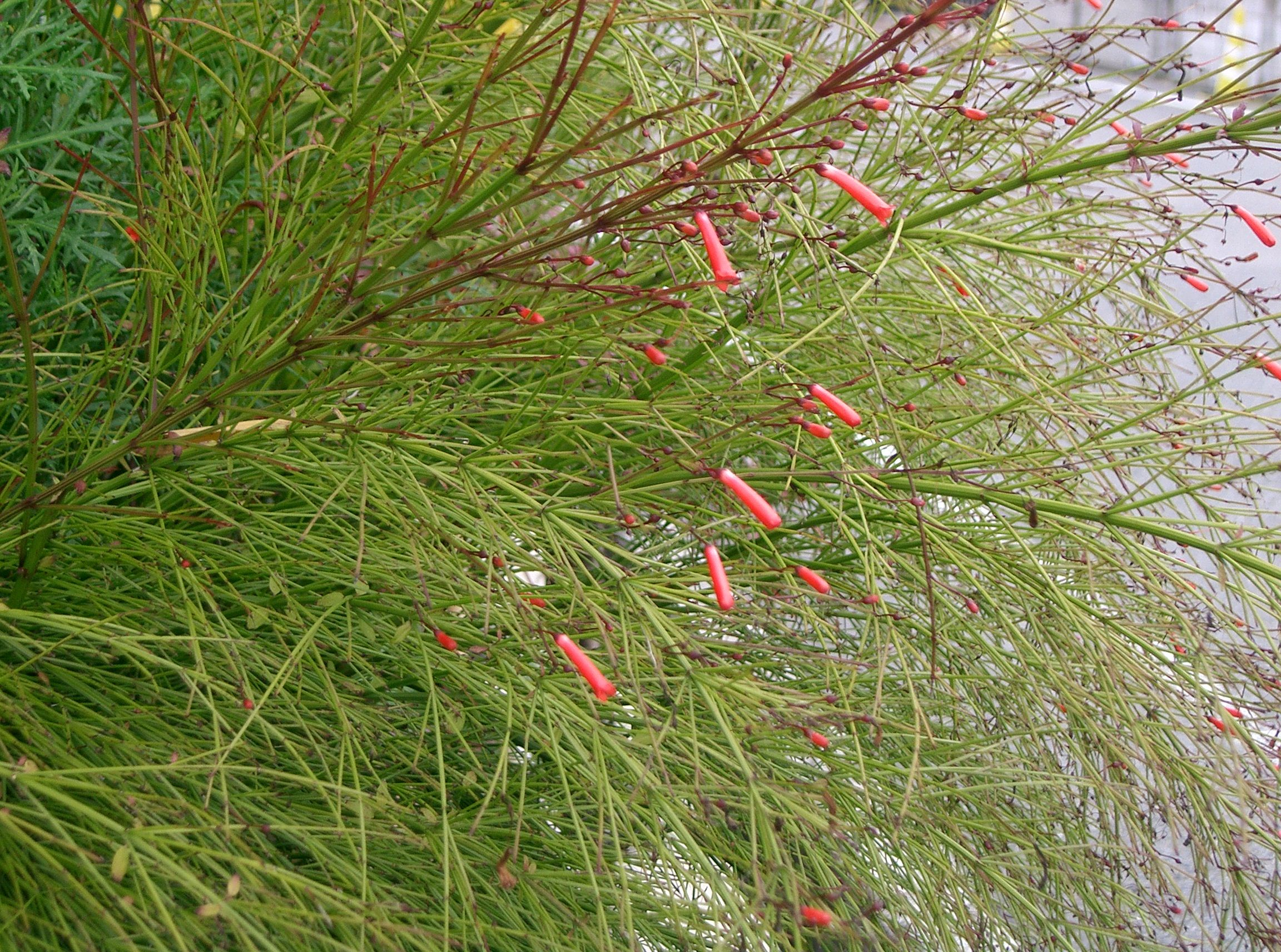
- Russelia equisetiformis

Scientific classification
- Kingdom: Plantae
- Clade: Tracheophytes
- Clade: Angiosperms
- Clade: Eudicots
- Clade: Asterids
- Order: Lamiales
- Family: Plantaginaceae
- Tribe: Russelieae
- Genus: Russelia; Jacq.

Species
- See text

Synonyms
- Flamaria Raf.

= Russelia =

Genus of flowering plants

Russelia is a genus of flowering plants in the plantain family, Plantaginaceae. It is sometimes placed in the families Scrophulariaceae or Veronicaceae. The name honours Scottish naturalist Alexander Russell (1715–1768). Members of the genus are commonly known as firecracker plants or coralblows. Russelia species grow in many parts of the world and are mildly drought resistant.

Russelia equisetiformis and Russelia sarmentosa are commonly used to hide unattractive retaining walls or fences because they grow quickly and have dense foliage. Growing to a maximum height of 1.8 m (5.9 ft), they are shrubs which will tolerate full sun to partial shade. As evergreens they bloom for most of the year.

Due to their attractively coloured flowers, these bushes attract birds and insects (such as bees) that feed on flower nectar.

== Species ==
As of August 2023, Plants of the World Online recognises the following species:

- Russelia acuminata Carlson
- Russelia campechiana Standl.
- Russelia chiapensis Lundell
- Russelia coccinea (L.) Wettst.
- Russelia contrerasii B.L.Turner
- Russelia conzattii Carlson
- Russelia cora Méndez-Lar. & O.Téllez
- Russelia cuneata B.L.Rob.
- Russelia equisetiformis Schltdl. & Cham. – Fountainbush, coral plant
- Russelia floribunda Kunth
- Russelia furfuracea Brandegee
- Russelia grandidentata Carlson
- Russelia hintonii Lundell
- Russelia iltisneeana B.L.Turner
- Russelia jaliscensis B.L.Rob.
- Russelia laciniata Standl. & Steyerm.
- Russelia lanceifolia Lundell
- Russelia leptopoda Lundell
- Russelia longifolia Carlson
- Russelia longipedunculata Pérez-Calix
- Russelia longisepala Carlson
- Russelia maculosa Lundell
- Russelia manantlana B.L.Turner
- Russelia multiflora Sims
- Russelia obtusata S.F.Blake
- Russelia parvifolia Carlson
- Russelia polyedra Zucc.
- Russelia pringlei B.L.Rob.
- Russelia pubescens Lundell
- Russelia purpusii Brandegee
- Russelia retrorsa Greene
- Russelia rotundifolia Cav.
- Russelia rugosa B.L.Rob.
- Russelia sarmentosa Jacq.
- Russelia sonorensis Carlson
- Russelia staleyae Carlson
- Russelia standleyi Carlson
- Russelia steyermarkii Carlson
- Russelia syringifolia Schltdl. & Cham.
- Russelia tehuana Pérez-Calix & Guzm.-Díaz
- Russelia tenuis Lundell
- Russelia tepicensis B.L.Rob.
- Russelia teres Lundell
- Russelia ternifolia Kunth
- Russelia tetraptera S.F.Blake
- Russelia verticillata Kunth
- Russelia villosa Lundell
- Russelia worthingtonii B.L.Turner

== Sources ==
Carlson, Margery (1957). "Monograph of the Genus Russelia (Scrophulariacae)". Fieldiana Botany. 29 (4): 244–285. doi:10.5962/bhl.title.2398.
