= Polyascus =

Scientific classification
- Kingdom: Animalia
- Phylum: Arthropoda
- Class: Thecostraca
- Subclass: Cirripedia
- Infraclass: Rhizocephala
- Family: Polyascidae
- Genus: Polyascus; Glenner, Lützen & Takahashi, 2003

Type species
- Sacculina polygenea Lützen & Takahashi, 1997

Genus of barnacles

Polyascus is a genus of barnacles in infraclass Rhizocephala. It was circumscribed in 2003 by Henrik Glenner, Jørgen Lützen, and Tohru Takahashi. They included three species, all transferred from Sacculina. The generic name polyascus (poly "many" + ascus "bag") refers to the typical presence of multiple external sac-like female bodies, known as externae. In Polyascus species, these originate from asexual reproduction.

== Species ==
As of 2017, WoRMS recognizes the following three species, all included in the genus's circumscription.

Binominal name (Original combination)	Author citation	Type host	Type locality	Ref
Polyascus gregaria (Sacculina gregaria)	(Okada & Miyashita, 1935)	Eriocheir japonica	Japan	^{apud WoRMS}
Polyascus plana (Sacculina plana)	(Boschma, 1933)	"Grapsus strigosus" (=Grapsus albolineatus)	"Takao, South Formosa" (=Kaohsiung City, Taiwan)	
Polyascus polygenea (Sacculina polygenea)	(Lützen & Takahashi, 1997)	Hemigrapsus sanguineus	"Inuki, Oyano Island, Amakusa Islands, Kyushu"	
