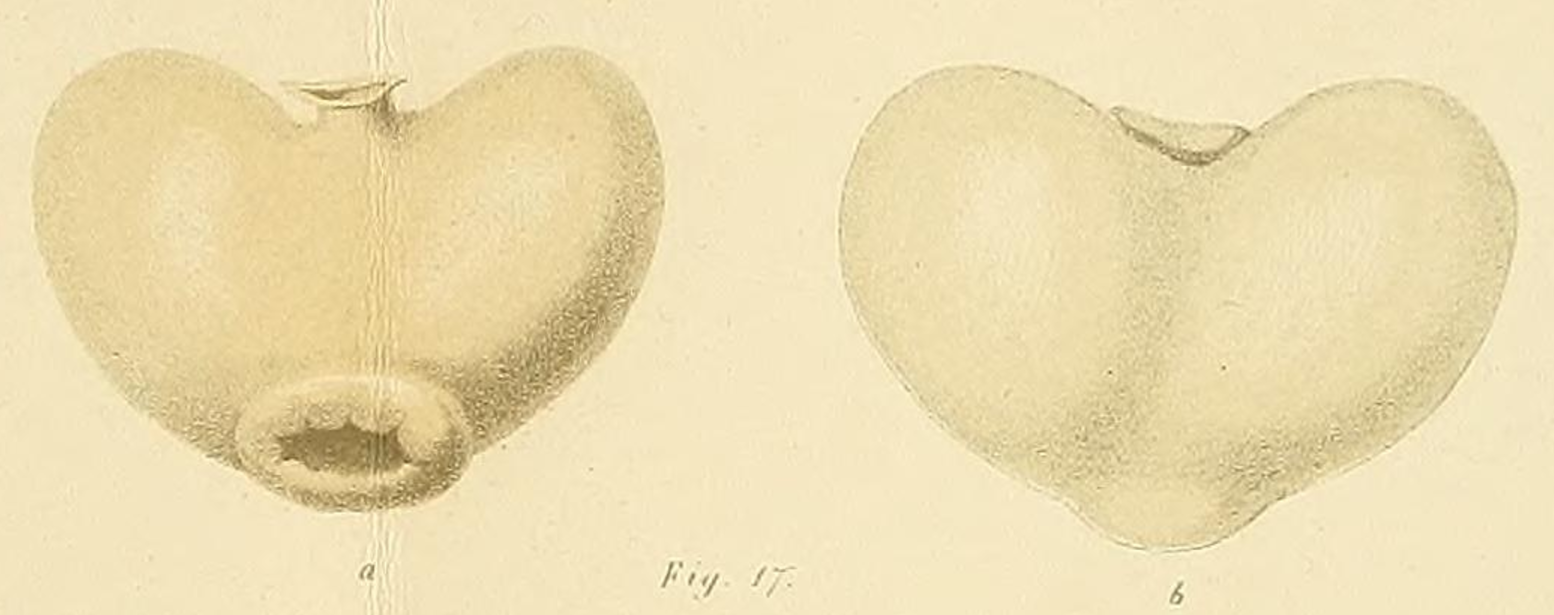
- H. hians.
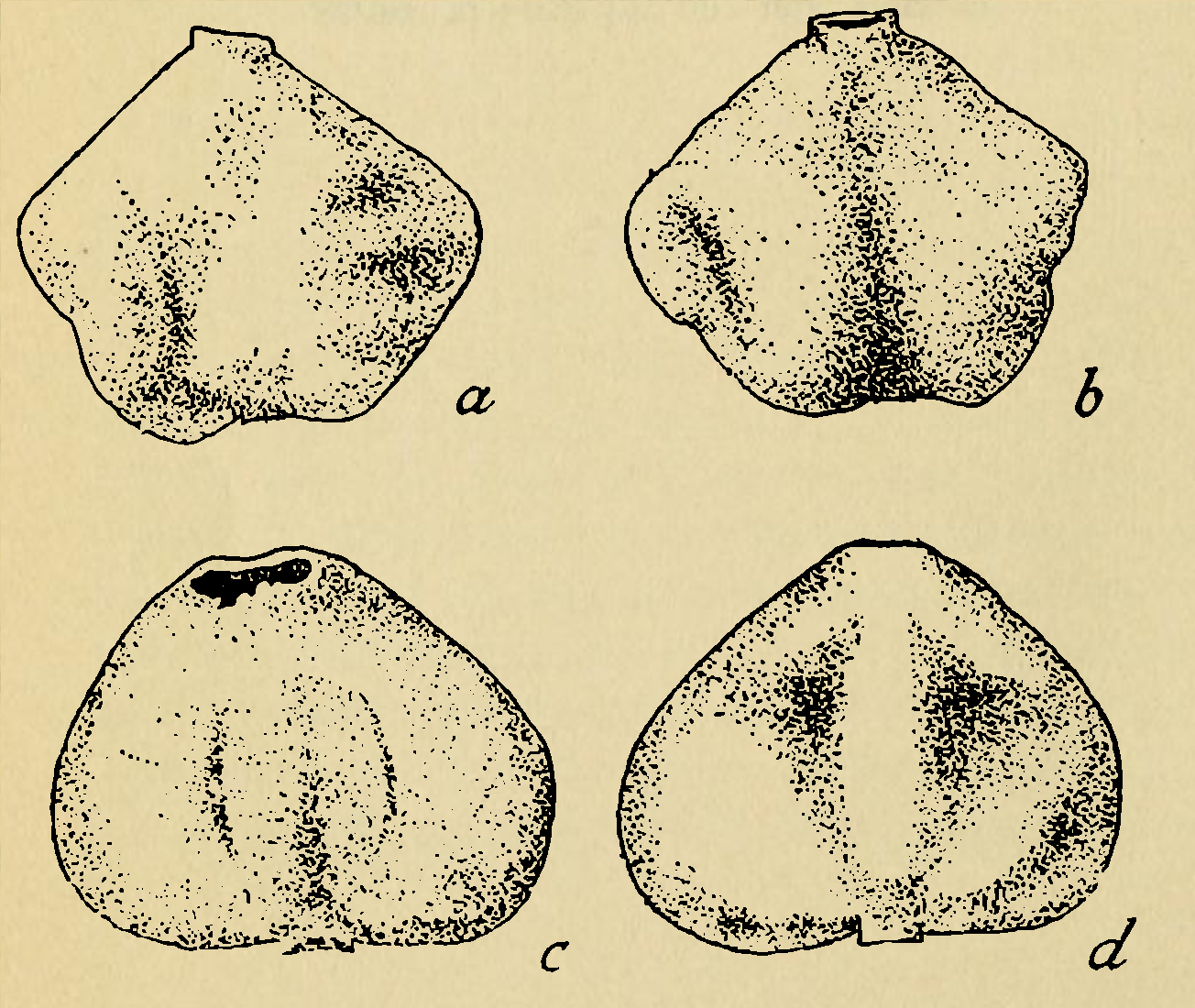
- H. occidentalis.

Scientific classification
- Kingdom: Animalia
- Phylum: Arthropoda
- Class: Thecostraca
- Subclass: Cirripedia
- Infraclass: Rhizocephala
- Family: Sacculinidae
- Genus: Heterosaccus; Smith, 1906

Type species
- Sacculina hians Kossmann, 1872

= Heterosaccus =

Genus of barnacles

Heterosaccus is a genus of barnacles in infraclass Rhizocephala. Like other taxa in this group, they parasitize crabs. Geoffroy Smith circumscribed the genus in 1906; he initially only included H. hians. Smith circumscribed a genus distinct from Sacculina due to a difference of the mesentery; in Heterosaccus, the mesentery does not stretch down to the mantle opening but rather only is present on the ring of attachment.

== Species ==
As of 2017, WoRMS recognizes the following fifteen species.

Binominal name (Original combination)	Author citation	Type host	Type locality	Ref
Heterosaccus californicus	Boschma, 1933	"Pugettia producta"	"Santa Cruz, California"	
Heterosaccus distortus	Boschma, 1933	"Schizophrys aspera"	"vicinity of Jolo," Philippines	
Heterosaccus dollfusi	Boschma, 1960	"Charybdis hoplites"	"Gulf of Suez"	
Heterosaccus gongylus	Boschma, 1962	Pleistacantha moseleyi	Andaman Sea	^{apud WoRMS}
Heterosaccus hians (Sacculina hians)	(Kossmann, 1872)	"Thalamita sp. aff. callianassae"	"Java"	
Heterosaccus indicus	Boschma, 1957	"Portunus pelagicus"	Mandapam Camp, Tamil Nadu	^{apud WoRMS}
Heterosaccus lunatus	Phillips, 1978	"Charybdis callianassa"	"Moreton Bay," Queensland	
Heterosaccus multilacinensis	Phillips, 1978	"Charybdis truncata"	"East Moreton Bay," Queensland	
Heterosaccus occidentalis (Drepanorchis occidentalis)	(Boschma, 1928)	"Mithrax forceps" (=Mithraculus forceps)	"Deadman's Bay, west coast of Florida"	
Heterosaccus papillosus (Drepanorchis papillosa)	(Boschma, 1933)	"Charybdis bimaculatus" (=Charybdis bimaculata)	"vicinity of Marindugue Island, Philippine Islands"	
Heterosaccus pellucidus	Shiino, 1943	"Thalamita integra integra"	Japan	^{apud WoRMS}
Heterosaccus ruginosus	Boschma, 1931	"Thalamita prymna"	"Singapore, coral reef"	
Heterosaccus setoensis	Shiino, 1943	"Thalamita wakensis" (= Thalamita seurati)	Seto Inland Sea	^{apud WoRMS}
Heterosaccus sibogae	Boschma, 1931	"Thalamita admeta" (= Thalamita admete)	"Siau Reef", Indonesia	
Heterosaccus tesselatus (Sacculina tessellata)	(Boschma, 1925)	"Mithrax ruber" (= Teleophrys ruber)	"Caracas Bay, Curaçao"	
