= E. japonica =

E. japonica may refer to:

- Eisenia japonica, an earthworm species in the genus Eisenia
- Eriobotrya japonica, the loquat, a fruit tree species indigenous to southeastern China
- Eriocheir japonica, a crab species in the genus Eriocheir
- Eristalis japonica, a hoverfly species in the genus Eristalis
- Eristalinus japonica, a hoverfly species in the genus Eristalinus
- Euaresta japonica, a fruit fly species
- Eubalaena japonica, the North Pacific right whale, a very large robust baleen whale species that was common in the North Pacific
- Eurya japonica, an ornamental plant species

== Synonyms ==
- Eutrema japonica, a synonym for Wasabia japonica, the wasabi or Japanese horseradish, a cultivated plant species

== See also ==
- Japonica (disambiguation)
