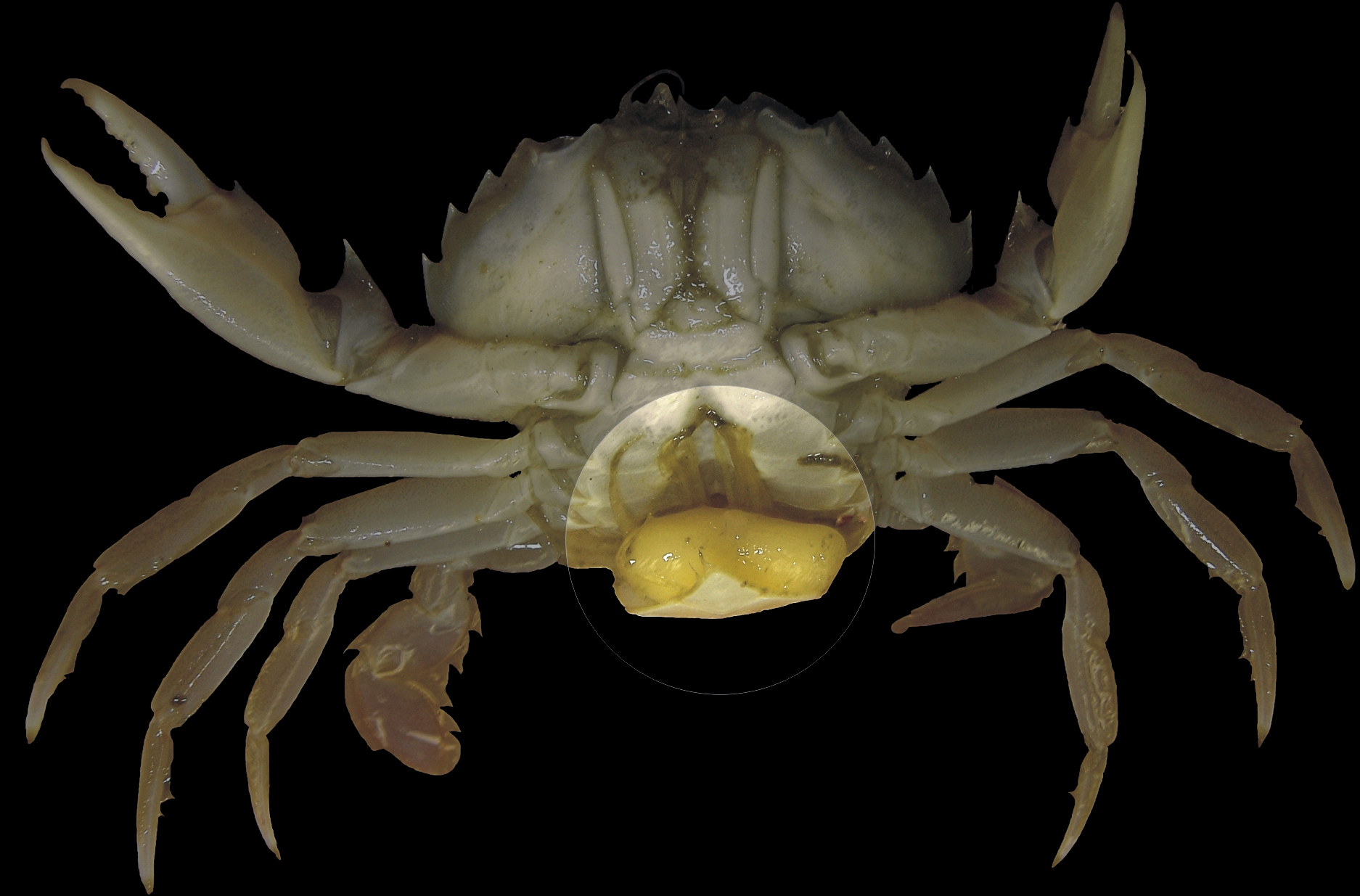
- Sacculina carcini (highlighted) attached to a female Liocarcinus crab

Scientific classification
- Kingdom: Animalia
- Phylum: Arthropoda
- Clade: Pancrustacea
- Class: Thecostraca
- Subclass: Cirripedia
- Family: Sacculinidae
- Genus: Sacculina
- Species: S. carcini

Binomial name
- Sacculina carcini Thompson, 1836

Synonyms
- List: Grapsisaccus benedeni Kossmann, 1872; Pachybdella rathkei Diesing, 1850; Peltogaster carcini Rathke, 1843; Portunascus corrugatus Giard & Bonnier, 1890; Sacculina andersonii Giard, 1887; Sacculina bellii Giard, 1888; Sacculina benedeni Kossmann, 1872; Sacculina betencourti Giard, 1887; Sacculina gibbsii Hesse, 1867; Sacculina pauli Popov, 1929; Sacculina pirimelae Guérin-Ganivet, 1911; Sacculina pisae Hoek, 1878; Sacculina priei Giard, 1887; Sacculina similis Giard in Bonnier, 1887

= Sacculina carcini =

Species of barnacle

Sacculina carcini, the crab hacker barnacle, is a species of parasitic barnacle in the family Sacculinidae, in particular a parasitic castrator, of crabs. The crab that most often is used as a host is the green crab, the natural range of which is the coasts of Europe and North Africa. It can be found attached to the crab's abdomen and affects consumption rates by humans.

== Rhizocephala ==
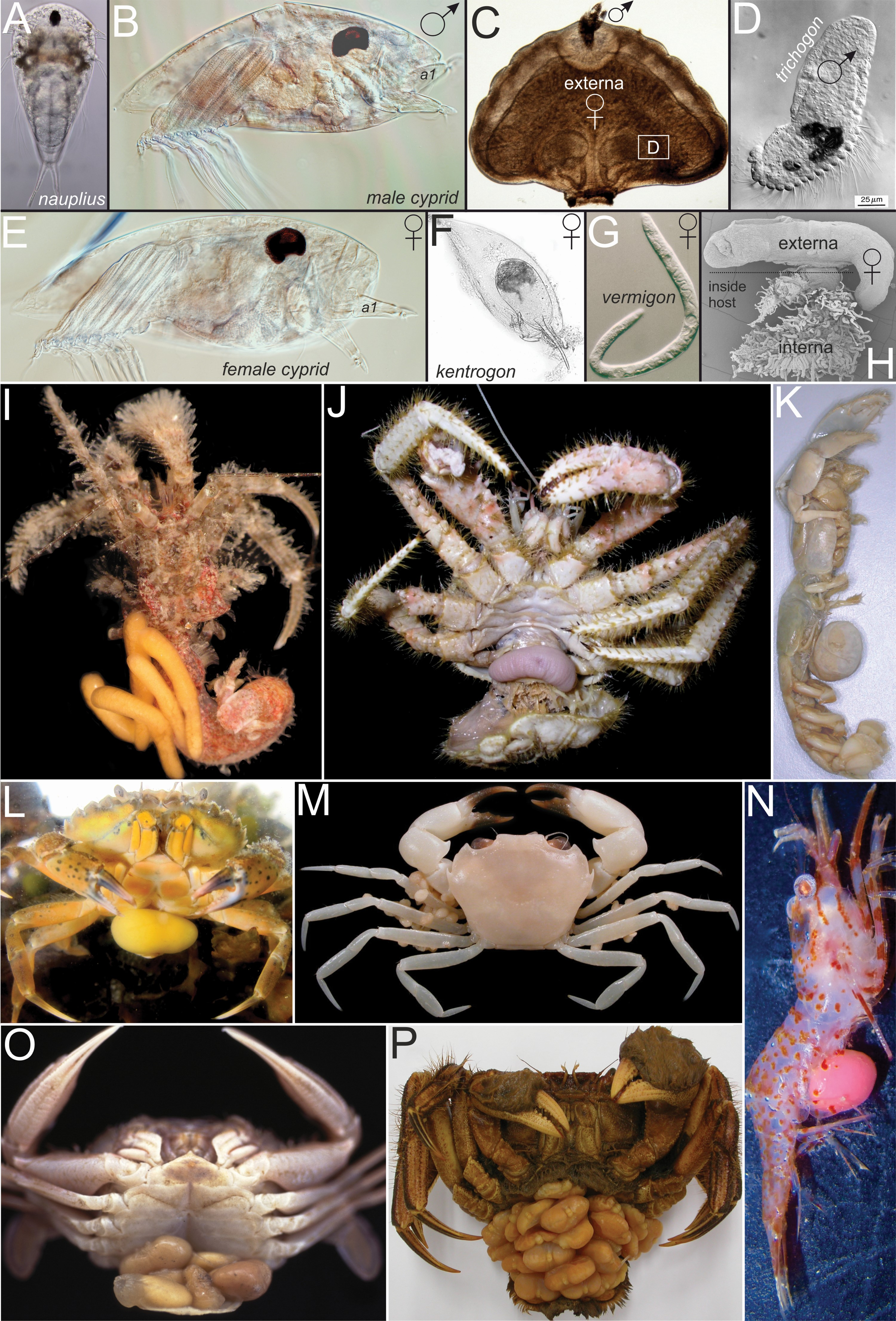
Rhizocephala. A–H, life cycle stages and larval morphology of selected Rhizocephala. A, Nauplius larva of Sacculina carcini. B, Male cyprid of S. carcini. C, Settled male cyprid of Lernaeodiscus porcellanae in the mantle aperture of a virginal female reproductive body (externa). D, Male trichogon of S. carcini dissected from the mantle cavity of a virginal female externa. E, Female cypris of S. carcini. F, Kentrogon of S. carcini, inside the empty cuticle of the spent female cyprid, in the process of injecting the primordial parasite. G, Vermigon of Loxothylacus panopaei. H, Scanning electron micrograph of Peltogaster curvata, showing the reproductive sac (externa) connected to the ramified internal root system. I-P, Diversity of Rhizocephala externae on various hosts.

The Kentrogonida order contains the Sacculinidae family, known for their ability to induce parasitic sterilization in crabs. The genus Sacculina established by Thompson in 1836 contains 129 species. Among these, Sacculina carcini was the first and most studied barnacle parasite.

== Appearance ==
Individual Sacculina carcini differ greatly between males and females. The female barnacles look like small slugs between entering the crab and infecting it. Once they have infected their host, they begin to develop and grow tendrils. This allows them to get the nutrients that they need from their host. Over time, it can be seen hanging off the crab's abdomen filled with reproductive tissue. The male parasites are much smaller and serve only to help the female Sacculina carcini reproduce.

== Distribution and habitat ==
Sacculina carcini is a monoxenic parasite of crabs, most commonly the green crab (Carcinus maenas). They have also been found to infect the Carcinus aestuarii, Liocarcinus depurator (Harbour crab), Pirimela denticulata, Necora puber (Velvet crab), and the Liocarcinus holsatus (Flying crab). The parasite's range largely coincides with that of this host, which is usually the coasts of Western Europe and North Africa. The green crab, however, has been expanding its range and has become established in both North and South America, Southern Africa and Australia, so it is possible that the parasite is now present outside its natural territory. These crabs all live in shallow water over sandy, rocky, or muddy substrates.

== Life cycle ==
A female Sacculina carcini larva settles on a suitable crab host and crawls across its surface until it finds a suitable spot such as the base of a seta (bristle). It then develops into a form called a kentrogon, which inserts a stylet into the crab and pushes its way inside. In order to do this, it has to shed its outer hard shell first. From there it moves through the inside of the crab, in due course pushing out a sac, known as an externa, on the underside of the crab's abdomen. The part remaining inside, the interna, develops tendrils which spread throughout the crab. They take over the stomach, intestines, and nervous system to absorb nourishment and enable the parasite to control the behavior of its host.

The presence of the parasite inhibits the development of the crab's gonads, which eventually atrophy; it also prevents the crab from molting, consequently preventing it from regenerating lost limbs. The parasite causes a male crab to develop certain feminine characteristics including the broadening of its abdomen, while in females, the abdomen becomes narrower and the pleopods degenerate. The eggs of the parasite develop in the externa and both male and female crabs carry these eggs around, secured under their abdomen, in the way that female crabs normally care for their own brood (but males never do). If the parasite is experimentally removed from the host, female crabs will usually regenerate their ovaries, but in males, sex change takes place and they develop ovarian tissue.

The eggs inside the externa are fertilized by male larvae which enter the sac through a pore. These males are tiny, never become adults and soon die. However, the female, including the externa, can live for as long as the crab host survives, perhaps one or two years. Hundreds of eggs are produced every day and remain in the sac for about six weeks. When the parasite eggs are ready for release, the crab will climb onto a rock, bob about to release them and waft them on their way. The cycle then continues with each generation.

== Organism impacts ==
The Sacculina carcini is known to control the population size of their hosts, like the Green crab, by making many of them infertile. Without reproduction, the population cannot expand and can cause a shortage for human consumption. The parasite can also cause their hosts to stop molting once infected. This can cause the crab to stop growing before it reaches a size big enough for human consumption. They are known to cause parasitic castration in crabs.

== Ecosystem impacts ==
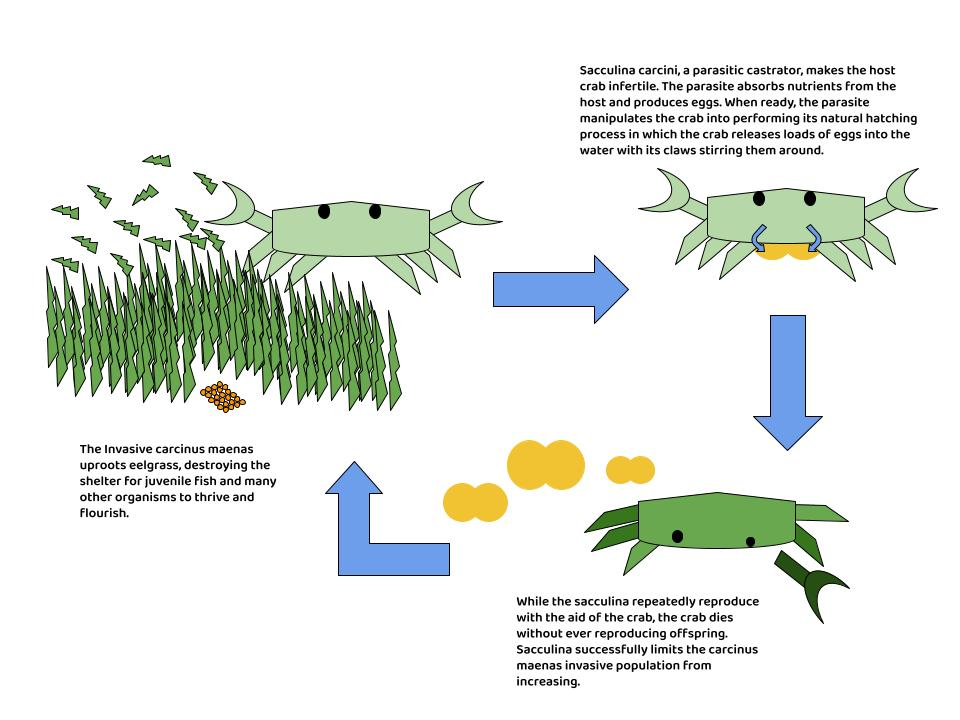
Sacculina carcini effect on carcinus maenas invasive population

Sacculina carcini can be considered as a potential biological control agent for Carcinus maenas, known as the invasive green crab species. However, this idea might be unlikely due to the parasite's low host specificity. While S. carcini tends to infect post-molt green crabs, this does not exclude the possibility of it infecting non-targeted native crabs. Therefore, more assessment is needed for the biological control of S. carcini. One possible solution could be to distribute the parasite only in low populations of C. maenas, enabling a faster death rate compared to other native species.

A negative impact on humans would be economic damage, reducing the accessibility of crabs for consumption.

== Conservation status ==
Sacculina carcini does not have a conservation status.
