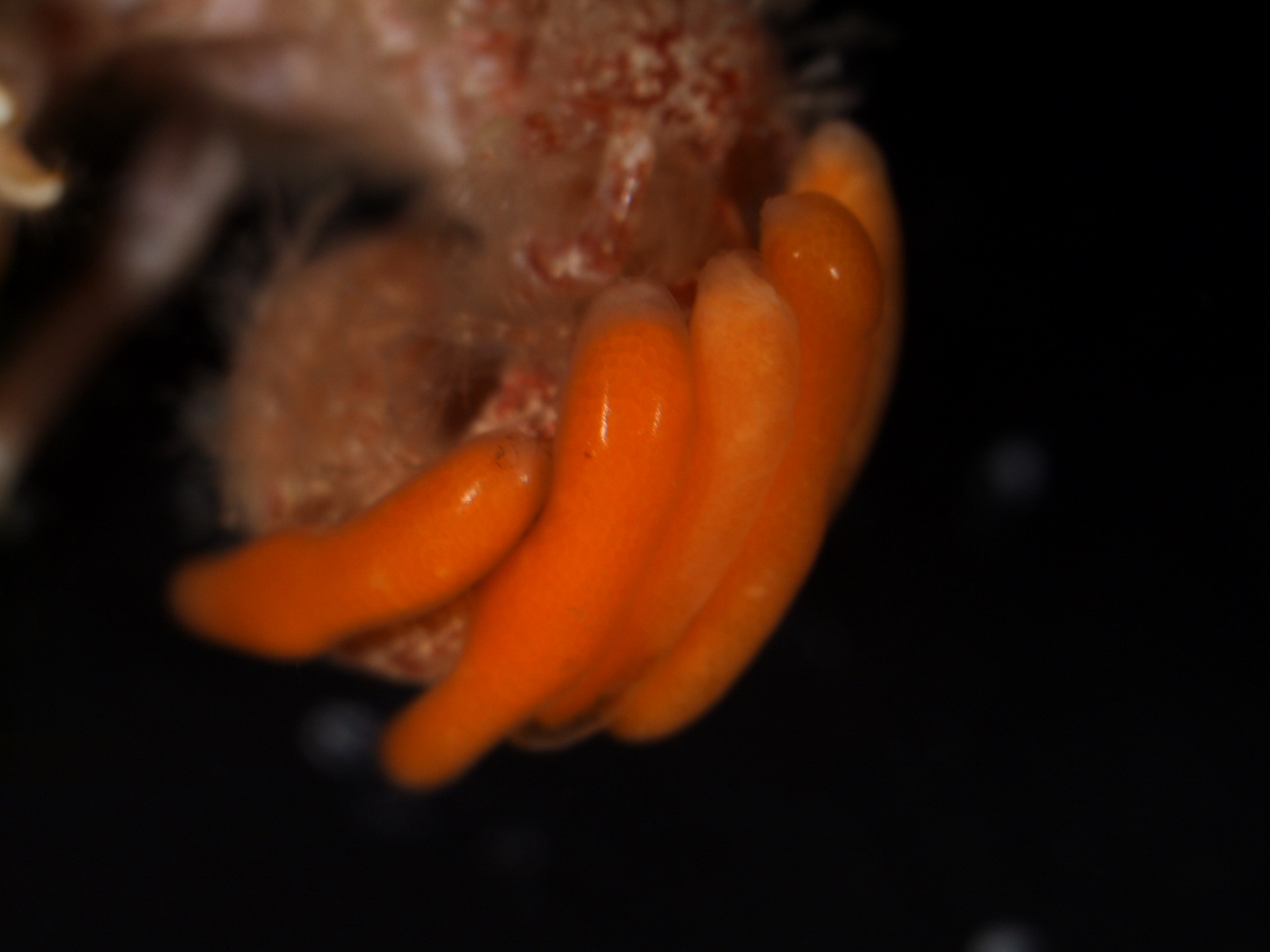
- Peltogasterella sulcata

Scientific classification
- Kingdom: Animalia
- Phylum: Arthropoda
- Clade: Pancrustacea
- Class: Thecostraca
- Subclass: Cirripedia
- Family: Peltogasterellidae
- Genus: Peltogasterella
- Species: P. sulcata

Binomial name
- Peltogasterella sulcata (Lilljeborg, 1859)

= Peltogasterella sulcata =

Species of barnacle

Peltogasterella sulcata is a species of parasitic barnacle in the family Peltogasterellidae.
