= Thompsoniidae =

Scientific classification
- Kingdom: Animalia
- Phylum: Arthropoda
- Clade: Pancrustacea
- Superclass: Multicrustacea
- Class: Thecostraca
- Subclass: Cirripedia
- Infraclass: Rhizocephala
- Family: Thompsoniidae; Høeg & Rybakov, 1992

Synonyms
- Thompsomiidae (lapsus)

Family of barnacles

The Thompsoniidae are a family of parasitic barnacles belonging to the highly apomorphic superorder Rhizocephala, and therein to the more diverse of the two orders, the Akentrogonida.

Thompsoniidae is one of the smaller families of Rhizocephala, as is typical for the Akentrogonida. They only contain four genera, of which two are not universally accepted:

- Diplothylacus Høeg & Lützen, 1993 (disputed)
- Pottsia Høeg & Lützen, 1993 (disputed)
- Thompsonia Häfele, 1911
- Thylacoplectus Coutière, 1902
