= Dipterosaccus =

Scientific classification
- Kingdom: Animalia
- Phylum: Arthropoda
- Class: Thecostraca
- Subclass: Cirripedia
- Infraclass: Rhizocephala
- Family: Peltogastridae
- Genus: Dipterosaccus; Van Kampen & Boschma, 1925

Genus of barnacles

Dipterosaccus is a genus of barnacle.

== Species ==
- Dipterosaccus indicus Van Kampen & Boschma, 1925
- Dipterosaccus shiinoi Yoshida, Hirose & Hirose, 2013
