= Thompsonia =

Thompsonia may refer to either of these taxa:-

- Thompsonia (plant), in the plant family Passifloraceae
- Thompsonia (crustacean), a parasitic barnacle
