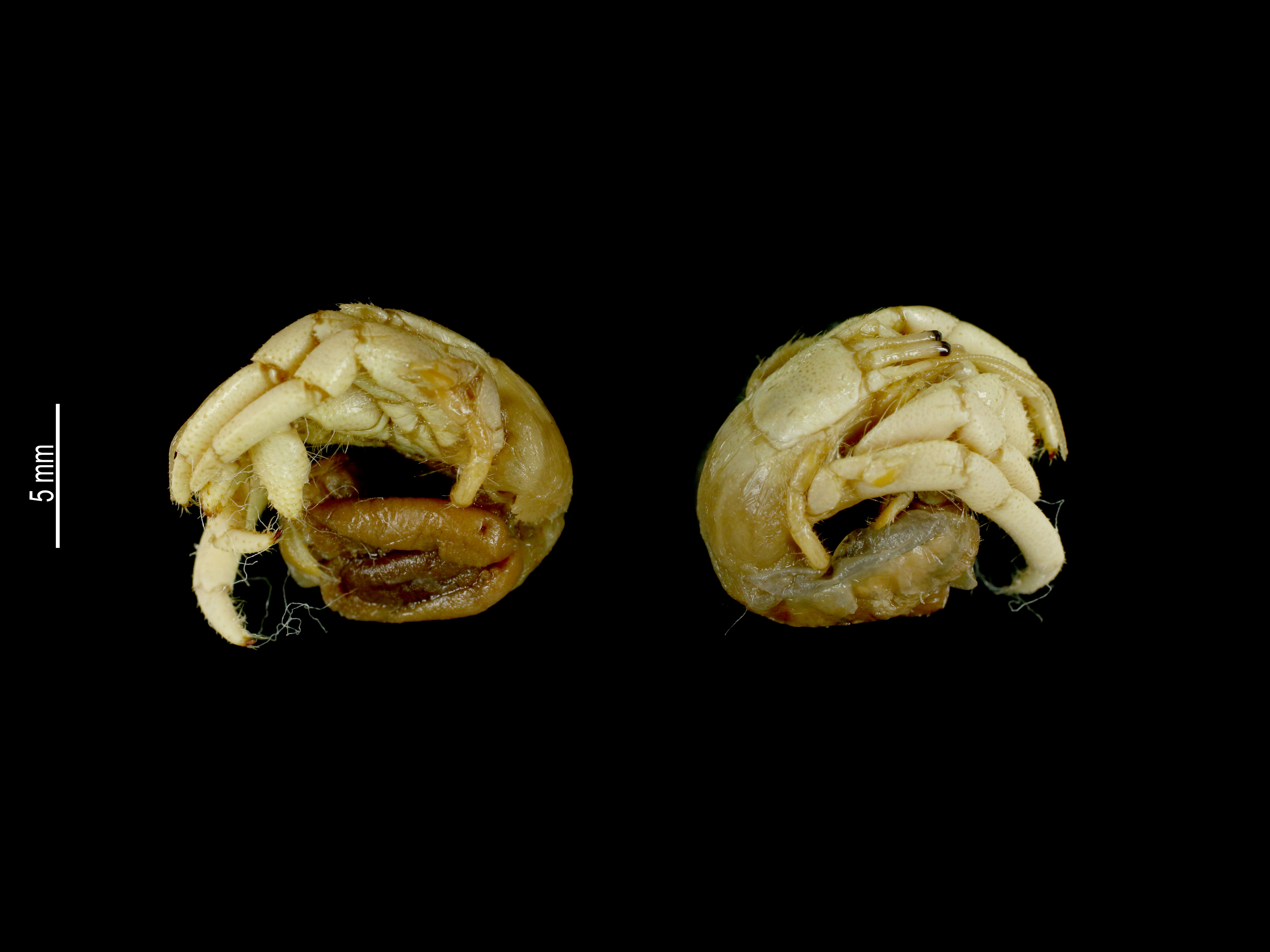
- Peltogaster senegalensis

Scientific classification
- Kingdom: Animalia
- Phylum: Arthropoda
- Clade: Pancrustacea
- Class: Thecostraca
- Subclass: Cirripedia
- Infraclass: Rhizocephala
- Family: Peltogastridae; Lilljeborg, 1861

= Peltogastridae =

Family of barnacles

The Peltogastridae are a family of barnacles belonging to the parasitic and highly apomorphic infraclass Rhizocephala. The Peltogastridae are by far the largest family of Rhizocephala. They comprise 14 genera, 3 of which (Lernaeodiscus, Septodiscus, and Triangulus) were moved from the family Lernaeodiscidae.

== Genera ==
These genera belong to the family Peltogastridae:

- Briarosaccus Boschma, 1930
- Dipterosaccus Van Kampen & Boschma, 1925
- Galatheascus Boschma, 1929
- Lernaeodiscus Müller, 1862
- Ommatogaster Yoshida & Osawa, 2011
- Paratriangulus Høeg & Glenner, 2019
- Peltogaster Rathke, 1842
- Pterogaster Van Baal, 1937
- Septodiscus Van Baal, 1937
- Septosaccus Duboscq, 1912
- Temnascus Boschma, 1951
- Tortugaster Reinhard, 1948
- Trachelosaccus Boschma, 1928
- Triangulopsis Guérin-Ganivet, 1911
