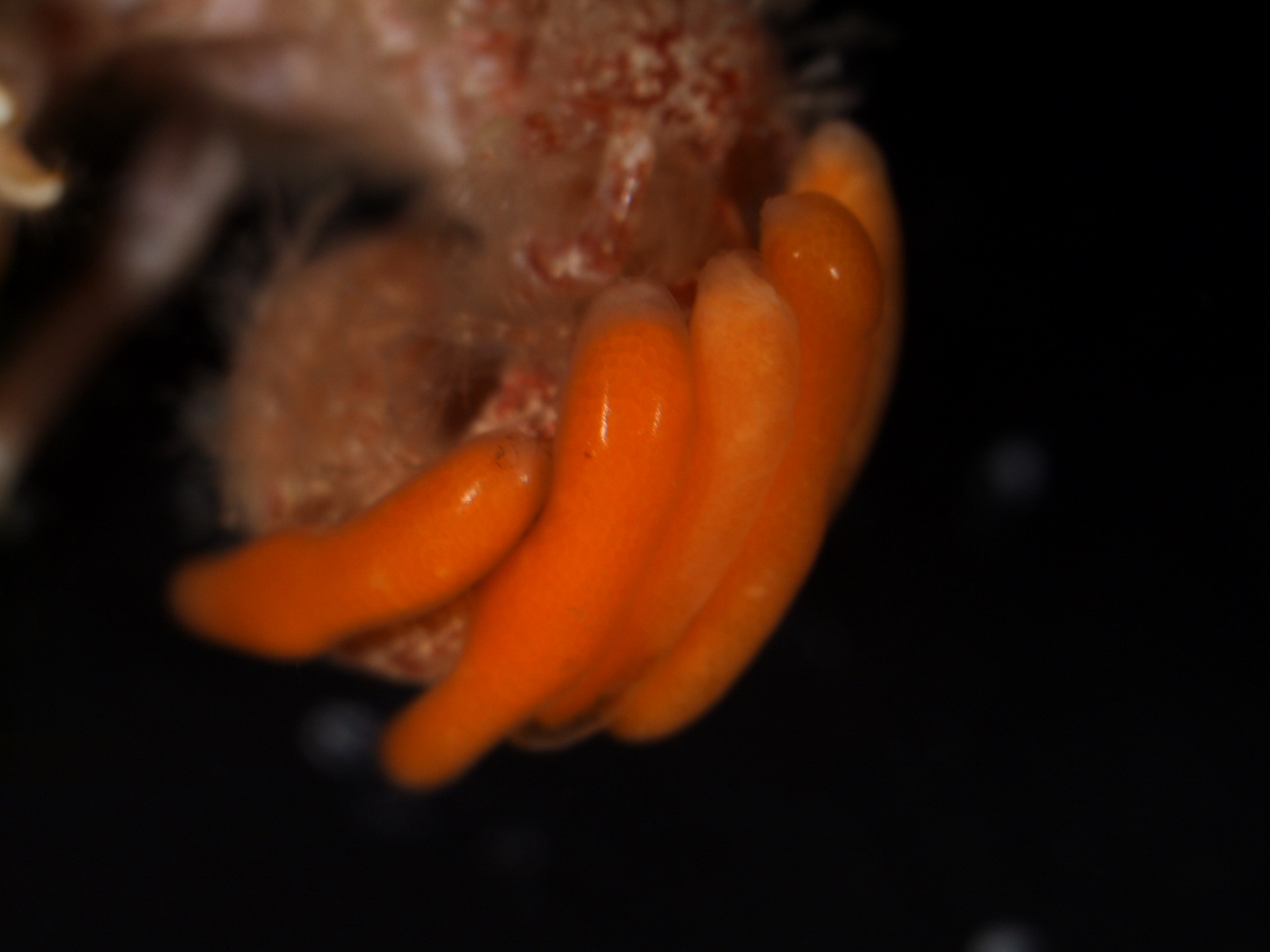
- Peltogasterella sulcata

Scientific classification
- Kingdom: Animalia
- Phylum: Arthropoda
- Class: Thecostraca
- Subclass: Cirripedia
- Family: Peltogasterellidae
- Genus: Peltogasterella; Krüger, 1912

= Peltogasterella =

Genus of crustaceans

Peltogasterella is a genus of parasitic barnacles in the family Peltogasterellidae. There are at least four described species in Peltogasterella.

== Species ==
These species belong to the genus Peltogasterella:

- Peltogasterella gracilis (Boschma, 1927)
- Peltogasterella sensuru Yoshida, Hirose & Hirose, 2015
- Peltogasterella socialis (Müller, 1863)
- Peltogasterella sulcata (Lilljeborg, 1859)
