= Chthamalophilidae =

Scientific classification
- Domain: Eukaryota
- Kingdom: Animalia
- Phylum: Arthropoda
- Class: Thecostraca
- Subclass: Cirripedia
- Infraclass: Rhizocephala
- Family: Chthamalophilidae

Family of crustaceans

Chthamalophilidae is a family of barnacles belonging to the infraclass Rhizocephala.

Genera:

- Bocquetia Pawlik, 1987
- Boschmaella Bocquet-Védrine, 1968
- Chthamalophilus Bocquet-Védrine, 1957
