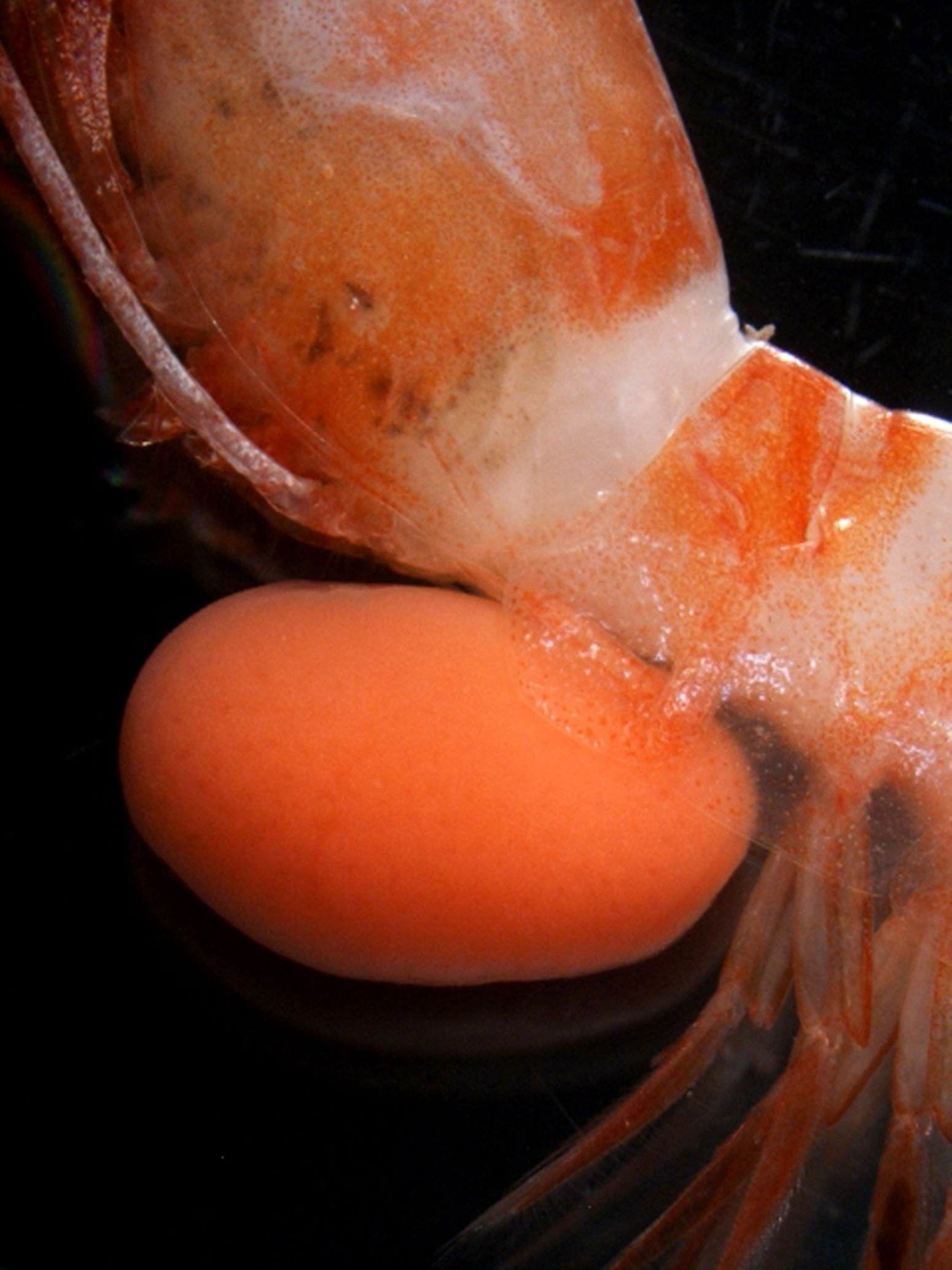

Scientific classification
- Kingdom: Animalia
- Phylum: Arthropoda
- Class: Thecostraca
- Subclass: Cirripedia
- Family: Clistosaccidae
- Genus: Sylon
- Species: S. hippolytes

Binomial name
- Sylon hippolytes M. Sars, 1870

= Sylon hippolytes =

Species of barnacle

Sylon hippolytes is a castrating parasite that infects shrimps from the families Hippolytidae (Hippolyte, Heptacarpus, Spirontocaris, Caridion, Eualus, Lebbeus), Pandalidae (Pandalus), and Crangonidae (Sclerocrangon, Crangon, Metacrangon).

== Structure ==
The adult female parasite consists of a body that can be differentiated into two distinct regions: a sac-like structure containing the reproductive organs (the externa), and a trophic, root like system situated inside the hosts body (the interna). It forms an elongated, sac-like growth on the abdomen of several shrimp species, measuring up to 1.2 centimeters in diameter. S. hippolytes castrates infected female shrimp by absorbing the reproductive energy of the host. Many other Rhizocephalan have the same castrating characteristic. The presence of the parasite will eventually come to pass after it dies, and the castrating mechanism is reversed for the host.

== Life cycle ==
Sylon hippolytes typically lives up to a maximum of one year.

== Reproduction ==
Sylon hippolytes are r-strategists. An externa can only produce offspring once during its lifetime. Therefore, the parasite utilizes an enormous amount of energy towards producing as many eggs as possible for reproduction. The size of the parasitic sac has proportional relationship with the size of its host. When S. hippolytes infect smaller hosts, the number of eggs produced can range from 1400 to 22000. As expected, when the parasite infects larger hosts, the range of eggs is larger, ranging from 19000 to one million eggs. This process requires a male cypris larva to penetrate the integument of the externa and deposit spermatogonia cells into the receptacles of the female externa.

== Distribution ==
Arctic, Bering Sea, Chukchi Sea, North Pacific, Sea of Okhotsk, Sea of Japan, North Atlantic, Iceland, Greenland, Shetland Islands, Spitzbergen.
