= Polyascidae =

Scientific classification
- Kingdom: Animalia
- Phylum: Arthropoda
- Superclass: Multicrustacea
- Class: Thecostraca
- Subclass: Cirripedia
- Infraclass: Rhizocephala
- Family: Polyascidae; Høeg & Glenner, 2019

Family of parasitic barnacles

Polyascidae is a family of parasitic barnacles in the class Thecostraca. There are at least two genera and about eight described species in Polyascidae.

== Genera ==
These genera belong to the family Polyascidae:

- Parasacculina Høeg & Glenner, 2019
- Polyascus Glenner, Lützen & Takahashi, 2003
