= Thompsonia (crustacean) =

Scientific classification
- Domain: Eukaryota
- Kingdom: Animalia
- Phylum: Arthropoda
- Class: Thecostraca
- Subclass: Cirripedia
- Infraclass: Rhizocephala
- Family: Thompsoniidae
- Genus: Thompsonia; Kossmann, 1872

Type species
- Thompsonia globosa Kossmann, 1872

Genus of barnacles

Thompsonia is a genus of barnacles which has evolved into an endoparasite of other crustaceans, including crabs and snapping shrimp. It spreads through the host's body as a network of threads, and produces many egg capsules which emerge through joints in the host's shell.

== Taxonomic history ==
The first scientific description of the genus was Robby Kossmann's description in 1872 of Thompsonia globosa. Kossmann named the genus after John Vaughan Thompson, the Irish naturalist who had recognised the cirripedian affinities of the Rhizocephala. The type specimens had been collected by Georg Semper in the East Indies, on the legs of the crab Lybia tessellata. Eleven species are now recognised:

- Thompsonia affinis Krüger, 1912
- Thompsonia chuni Häfele, 1911
- Thompsonia cubensis Reinhard & Stewart, 1956
- Thompsonia edwardsi Coutière, 1902
- Thompsonia globosa Kossmann, 1872
- Thompsonia haddoni Coutière, 1902
- Thompsonia japonica Häfele, 1911
- Thompsonia littoralis Lützen & Jespersen, 1990
- Thompsonia pilodiae Lützen & Jespersen, 1990
- Thompsonia reinhardi Lützen, 1992
- Thompsonia sinensis Keppen, 1877
