= Duplorbidae =

Scientific classification
- Kingdom: Animalia
- Phylum: Arthropoda
- Class: Thecostraca
- Subclass: Cirripedia
- Infraclass: Rhizocephala
- Family: Duplorbidae; Høeg & Rybakov, 1992

Family of crustaceans

Duplorbidae is a family of barnacles belonging to the infraclass Rhizocephala.

Genera:

- Arcturosaccus Rybakov & Høeg, 1992
- Cryptogaster Bocquet-Védrine & Bourdon, 1984
- Duplorbis Smith, 1906
