= Polysaccus =

Scientific classification
- Kingdom: Animalia
- Phylum: Arthropoda
- Class: Thecostraca
- Subclass: Cirripedia
- Infraclass: Rhizocephala
- Family: Polysaccidae; Lützen & Takahashi, 1996
- Genus: Polysaccus; Høeg & Lützen, 1993

Species
- Polysaccus japonicus Høeg & Lützen, 1993; Polysaccus mediterraneus (Caroli, 1929)

Genus of crustaceans

Polysaccus is a genus of parasitic barnacles belonging to the monotypic family Polysaccidae.
