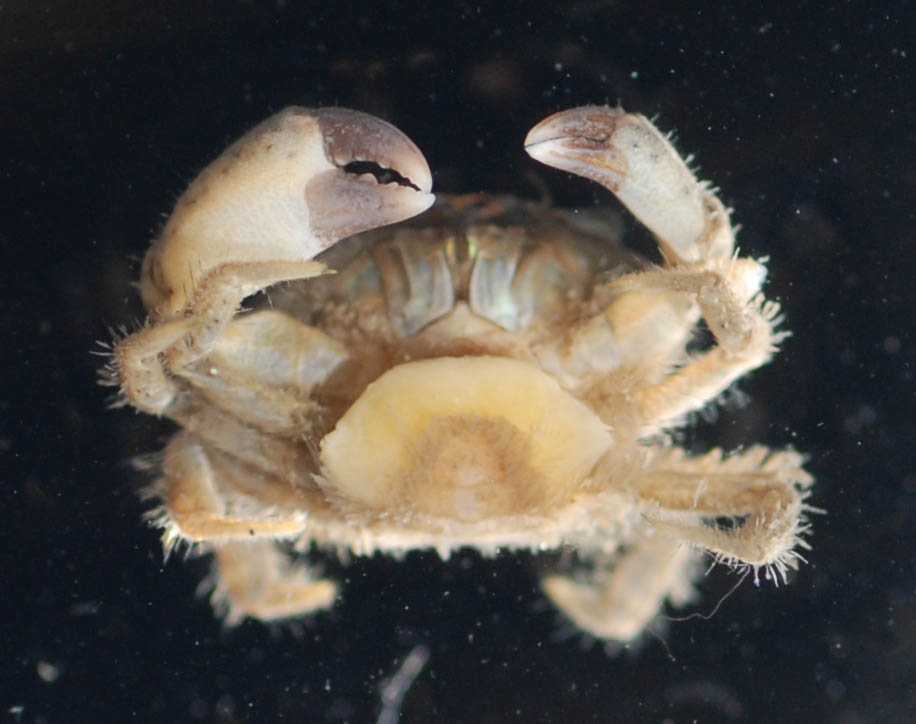
- Loxothylacus panopaei, Maryland

Scientific classification
- Kingdom: Animalia
- Phylum: Arthropoda
- Class: Thecostraca
- Subclass: Cirripedia
- Family: Sacculinidae
- Genus: Loxothylacus; Boschma, 1928

= Loxothylacus =

Genus of crustaceans

Loxothylacus is a genus of parasitic barnacles in the family Sacculinidae. There are more than 20 described species in Loxothylacus.

== Species ==
These species belong to the genus Loxothylacus:

- Loxothylacus amoenus Boschma, 1940
- Loxothylacus aristatus Boschma, 1931
- Loxothylacus armatus Boschma, 1949
- Loxothylacus auritus Boschma, 1954
- Loxothylacus bicorniger Boschma, 1933
- Loxothylacus brachythrix Boschma, 1940
- Loxothylacus caribaeus Boschma, 1974
- Loxothylacus carinatus (Kossmann, 1872)
- Loxothylacus corculum (Kossmann, 1872)
- Loxothylacus desmothrix Boschma, 1931
- Loxothylacus echioides Boschma, 1940
- Loxothylacus engeli Boschma, 1968
- Loxothylacus ihlei Boschma, 1949
- Loxothylacus kossmanni Boschma, 1955
- Loxothylacus longipilus (Boschma, 1933)
- Loxothylacus musivus Boschma, 1940
- Loxothylacus omissus Boschma, 1957
- Loxothylacus panopaei (Gissler, 1884)
- Loxothylacus perarmatus Reinhard & Reischman, 1958
- Loxothylacus sclerothrix Boschma, 1933
- Loxothylacus setaceus Boschma, 1931
- Loxothylacus spinulosus Boschma, 1928
- Loxothylacus strandi Boschma, 1936
- Loxothylacus texanus Boschma, 1933
- Loxothylacus tomentosus Shiino, 1943
- Loxothylacus torridus Boschma, 1940
- Loxothylacus variabilis Boschma, 1940
- Loxothylacus vepretus Boschma, 1947
