= Mycetomorpha =

Scientific classification
- Kingdom: Animalia
- Phylum: Arthropoda
- Class: Thecostraca
- Subclass: Cirripedia
- Infraclass: Rhizocephala
- Family: Mycetomorphidae; Høeg & Rybakov, 1992
- Genus: Mycetomorpha; Potts, 1912

Species
- Mycetomorpha albatrossi Høeg & Rybakov, 1996; Mycetomorpha vancouverensis Potts, 1912; Mycetomorpha abyssalis Kakui, 2024

Genus of crustaceans

Mycetomorpha is a genus of crustaceans belonging to the monotypic family Mycetomorphidae. The naupliar larval stage is absent.

The species of this genus are found in Alaska and Japan.
