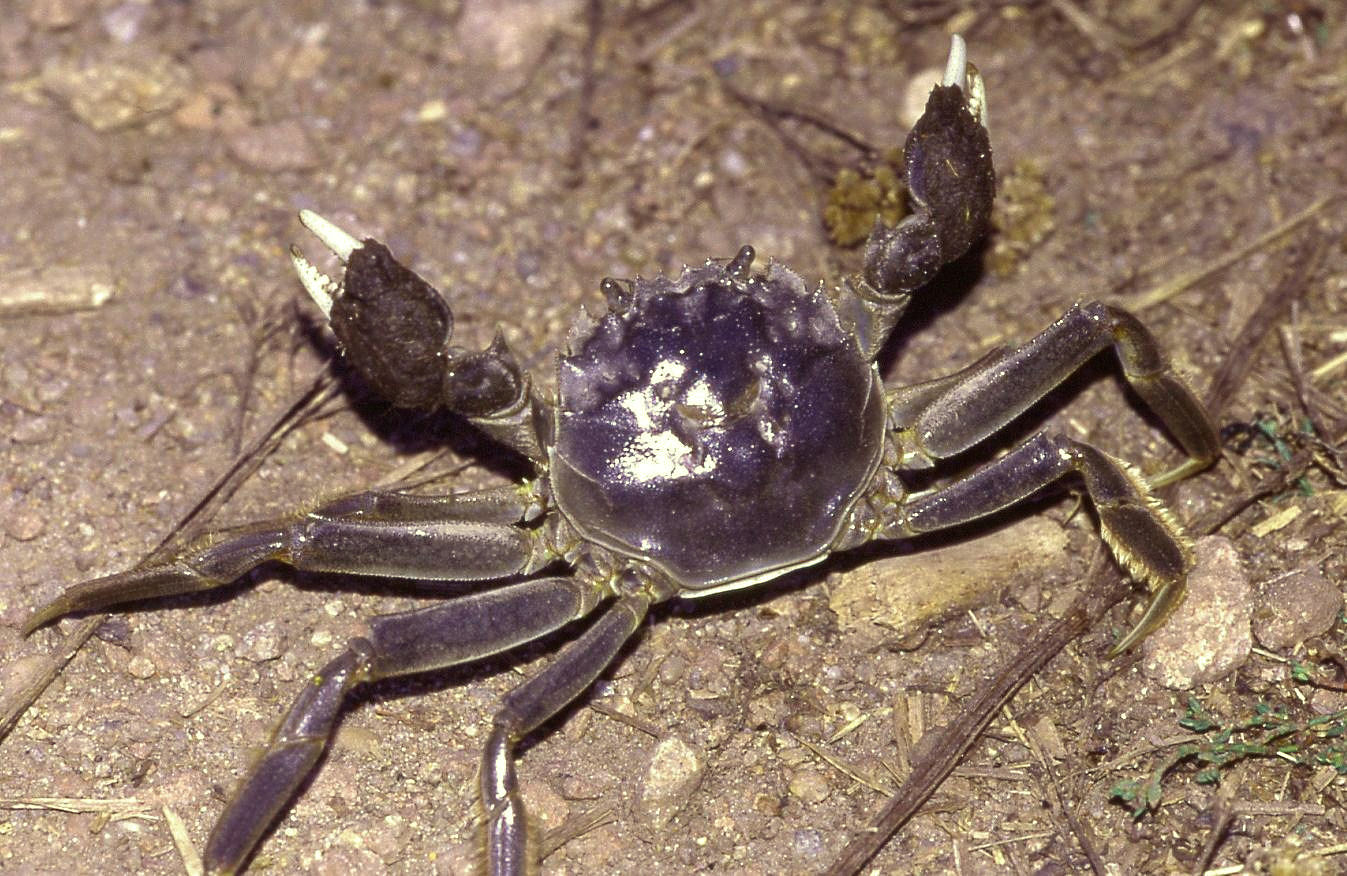
- Eriocheir sinensis

Scientific classification
- Kingdom: Animalia
- Phylum: Arthropoda
- Clade: Pancrustacea
- Class: Malacostraca
- Order: Decapoda
- Suborder: Pleocyemata
- Infraorder: Brachyura
- Family: Varunidae
- Subfamily: Varuninae
- Genus: Eriocheir; De Haan, 1835

Species
- Eriocheir hepuensis Dai, 1991; Eriocheir japonica (De Haan, 1835); Eriocheir sinensis H. Milne-Edwards, 1853; Eriocheir ogasawaraensis Komai in Komai, Yamasaki, Kobayashi, Yamamoya & Watanabe, 2006

= Eriocheir =

Genus of crabs

Eriocheir is a genus of crabs, including the Chinese mitten crab, E. sinensis. Formerly in the family Grapsidae, it is now placed in the Varunidae.

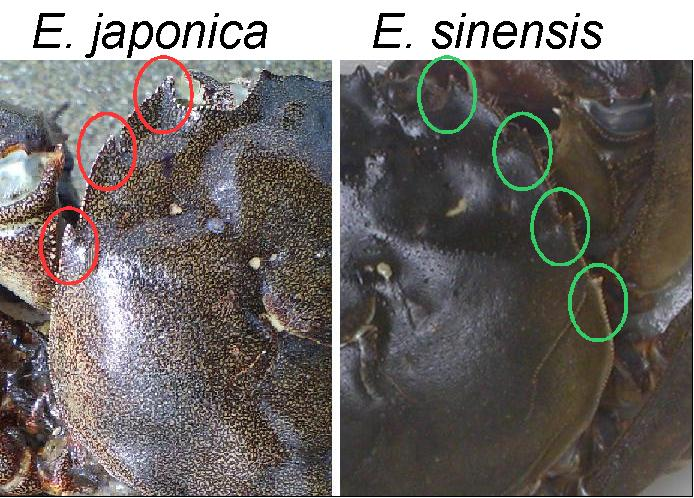
Comparison between Japanese (left) and Chinese (right) mitten crabs
