= Akentrogonida =

Order of crustaceans

Akentrogonida was formerly a suborder of barnacles belonging to the group Rhizocephala, now an infraclass. In research published by Chan et al. in 2021, the suborders Akentrogonida and Kentrogonida were removed from the infraclass Rhizocephala, leaving 13 families as children of Rhizocephala without intermediate orders or suborders.
