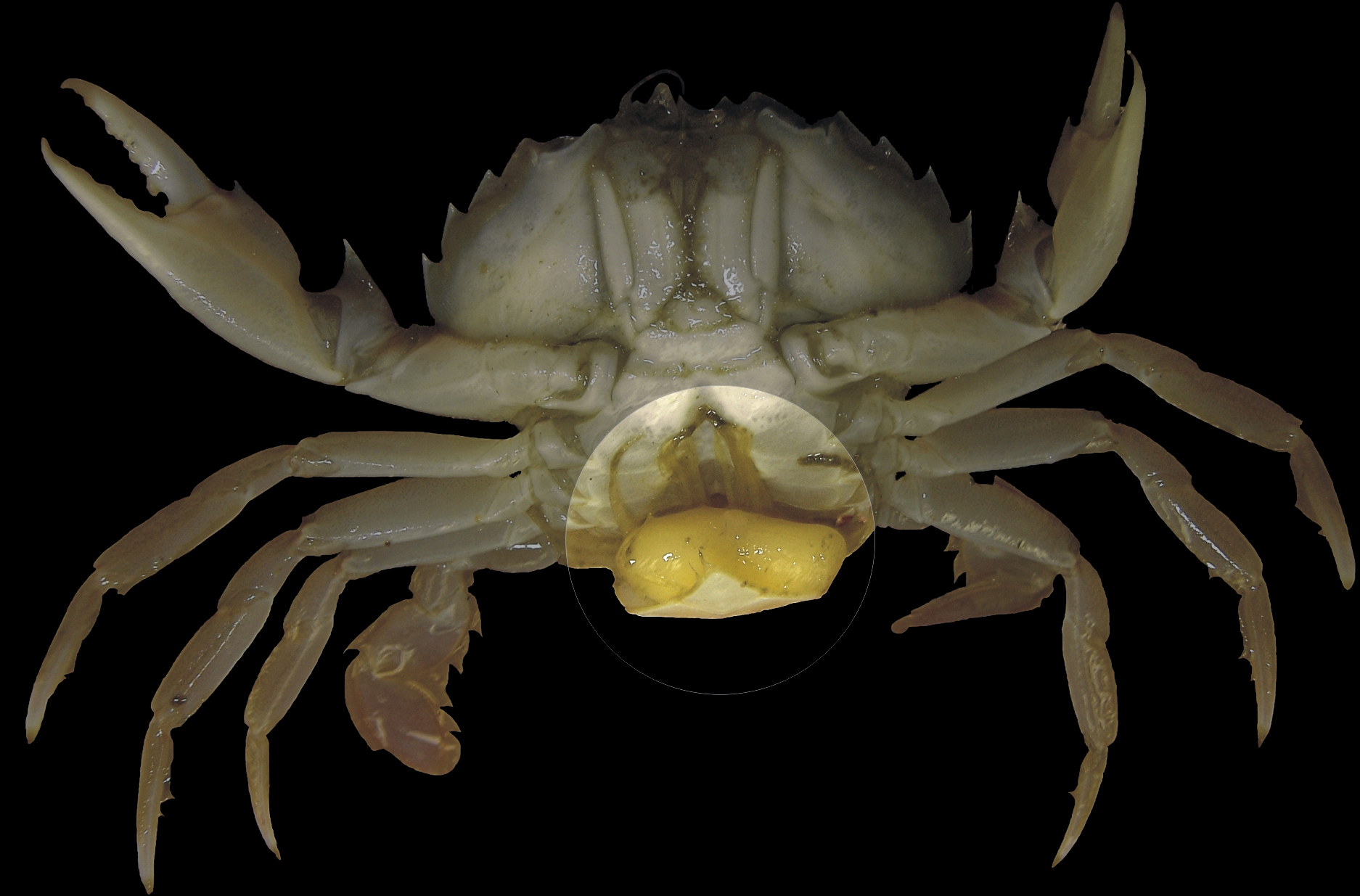
- Externa (highlighted) of mature female Sacculina on a female Liocarcinus holsatus

Scientific classification
- Kingdom: Animalia
- Phylum: Arthropoda
- Class: Thecostraca
- Subclass: Cirripedia
- Infraclass: Rhizocephala; Müller, 1862

= Rhizocephala =

Superorder of barnacles

Rhizocephala are derived barnacles that are parasitic castrators. Their hosts are mostly decapod crustaceans, but include Peracarida, mantis shrimps and thoracican barnacles. Their habitats range from the deep ocean to freshwater. Together with their sister groups Thoracica and Acrothoracica, they make up the subclass Cirripedia. Their body plan is uniquely reduced in an extreme adaptation to their parasitic lifestyle, and makes their relationship to other barnacles unrecognisable in the adult form. They also exhibit the most extreme sexual dimorphism of all known animals. The females are parasites who inject themselves into a host and take over their bodies through a network of filaments, while the males are hyperparasites who inject themselves into a settled female and cease to exist as independent organisms through the degeneration of all tissues except the ones responsible for spermatogenesis. The name Rhizocephala derives from the Ancient Greek roots ῥίζα (rhiza, "root") and κεφαλή (kephalē, "head"), describing the adult female, which mostly consists of a network of thread-like extensions penetrating the body of the host.

== Description ==
=== Adults ===
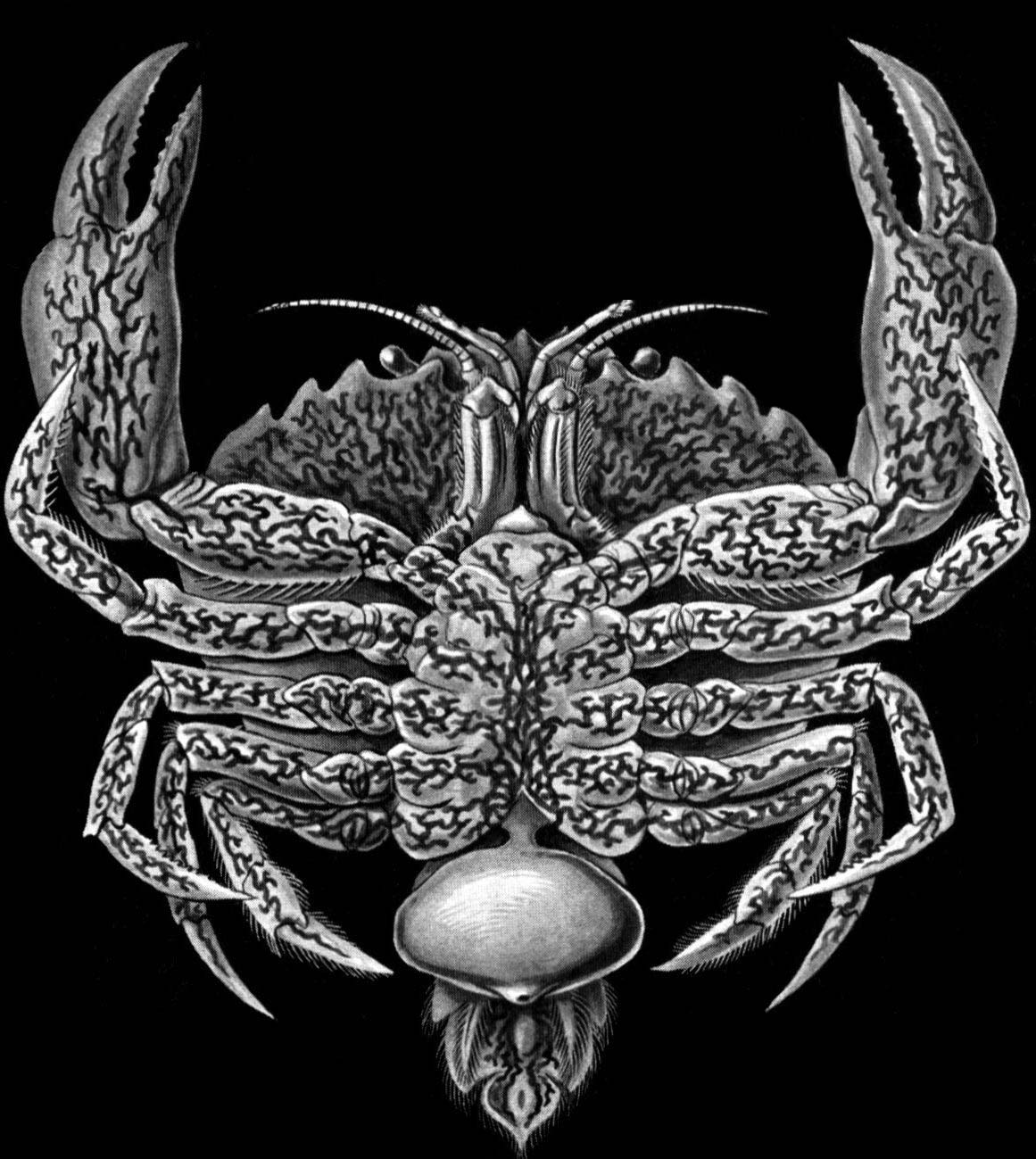
Sacculina carcini (adult female) parasitizing a crab (Carcinus maenas). Haeckel's drawing shows the internal network of filaments from the parasite.

Adult rhizocephalans lack appendages, segmentation, and all internal organs except gonads, a few muscles, and the remains of the nervous system. Females have a cuticle, which is never shed. Other than the larval stages, there is nothing identifying them as crustaceans or arthropods in general. The only distinguishable portion of an adult rhizocephalan body is the externa: the reproductive portion of adult females.

=== Nauplius and cypris larvae ===
Nauplii released from adult females swim in water for several days without taking food (the larva has no mouth and no intestine) and transform into cypris larvae (cyprids) after several moults. Like the nauplii, the cyprids are lecithotrophic (non-feeding).

=== Parasitism ===
Rhizocephalan crustaceans were traditionally divided into Kentrogonida, with a kentrogon stage, and Akentrogonida, which lack it. However, molecular data show these groups are paraphyletic, so they can only be considered developmental types rather than formal orders.

The female cypris larva in Kentrogonida settles on a host and metamorphoses into a specialized juvenile form, a kentrogon. This has no visible segmentation and no appendages except the antennules. These are used to attach the larva to the host; their only purpose is to inject a cell mass, the vermigon, into the host's hemolymph through a retractive hollow stylet on the larva's head. The kentrogon stage seems to have been secondarily lost in all of the Akentrogonida, where the cypris injects the vermigon through one of its antennules. The vermigon grows into a network of root-like threads through the host's tissue, centering on the digestive system and especially the hepatopancreas, and absorb nutrients from the hemolymph. The network of threads is called the interna. The female then grows a sac-like externa, which consists of a mantle, a mantle cavity, an ovary and a pair of passageways known as cell receptacles, extruding from the abdomen of the host.

In the order Kentrogonida, the virgin externa contains no openings at first. But it soon molts to a second stage that contains an orifice known as the mantle departure, and which leads into the two receptacle passageways — once assumed to be the testes in hermaphroditic parasites before the realization that they were actually two separate sexes — and starts releasing pheromones to attract male cyprids. From inside the body of the male cypris that succeeds in entering the departure, a unique and very short lived male stage called the trichogen emerges through the antennule opening. It is the homologue of the female kentrogon, but is reduced to an amoeboid unsegmented cuticle-covered mass of cells consisting of three to four cell-types: the dorsolateral, the ventral epidermis, the inclusion cells, and the postganglion. The externa have room for two males, one for each of the receptacles, which increase the heterozygosity of the offspring. Once inside, the trichogen will shed its cuticle before reaching the end of the passageway.

In the order Akentrogonida, which form a monophyletic group nested within the paraphyletic Kentrogonida, the male does not develop into a trichogon, and the cypris injects its cell mass through its antennule and directly into the body of the immature externa. The offspring also hatch directly into fully developed cyprids instead of nauplius larvae (except for a few species of kentrogonid rhizocephalans, which hatch into cyprids like the akentrogonids, the kentrogonids have kept their nauplius stage). In species like Clistosaccus paguri, the male injects its cluster of cells which migrates through the connective tissue of the mantle and into the receptacle. But in forms like Sylon hippolytes the receptacle is absent, and the males cells implant in the ovary instead. While only a single male can settle in each receptacle, which is the rule in Kentrogonida, the number of implanted males in Akentrogonida can range from just one to more than ten.

=== Reproduction ===
In Kentrogonida, the small cluster of cells injected by the male cypris differentiates into a loosely connected mass of sperm-producing germ cells, once it reaches its destination inside the female. Being nothing more than sperm-forming cells, these adult male rhizocephalans represent the simplest form of male in the entire animal kingdom. Mature female externa releases eggs into its mantle cavity where eggs are fertilised by sperm from the hyperparasitic male(s). They are apparently the only group of crustaceans in which there is sexual dimorphism of larvae, with male nauplii generally being larger than female ones. Due to the larval sexual dimorphism in the Kentrogonida, the females produce two different egg sizes; small female eggs and larger male eggs. It appears the sex determination in Akentrogonida is environmental.

In Peltogasterella gracilis, the externa produces several batches of larvae before it drops off the host, taking the male(s) inside with it. After the original externa disappear, the host moults and the interna grows buds that each develops into a new virgin externa. The females commonly has two cypris cell receptacles. With more than one externa, and new ones replacing the old ones, each female Peltogasterella can receive sperm from numerous males during her lifetime.

The externa is where the host's egg sac would be, and the host's behaviour is chemically altered: it is castrated and does not moult until the aged externa drops off. The host treats the externa as if it were its own egg sac. This behaviour even extends to male hosts, which would never have carried eggs, but care for the externa in the same way as females.

In some species, like Sacculina polygenea, the externa dies, falls off and is replaced 1-3 times during the lifetime of the host, which allows the host to grow and moult between each externa. In kentrogonid externae, the externa moult between broods. In most, but not all members of Akentrogonida, the externa produces just a single brood of larvae and therefore does not moult.

== Classification ==
Following an updated classification of barnacles by Chan et al. (2021), the subgroups Akentrogonida and Kentrogonida were dropped, leaving 13 families as children of the infraclass Rhizocephala.

- Family Chthamalophilidae Bocquet-Védrine, 1961
- Family Clistosaccidae Boschma, 1928
- Family Duplorbidae Høeg & Rybakov, 1992
- Family Mycetomorphidae Høeg & Rybakov, 1992
- Family Parthenopeidae Rybakov & Høeg, 2013
- Family Peltogasterellidae Høeg & Glenner, 2019
- Family Peltogastridae Lilljeborg, 1861
- Family Pirusaccidae Høeg & Glenner, 2019
- Family Polyascidae Høeg & Glenner, 2019
- Family Polysaccidae Lützen & Takahashi, 1996
- Family Sacculinidae Lilljeborg, 1861
- Family Thompsoniidae Høeg & Rybakov, 1992
- Family Triangulidae Høeg & Glenner, 2019
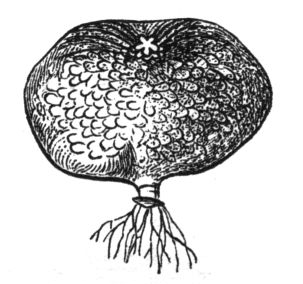
Clistosaccus paguri (Akentrogonida)

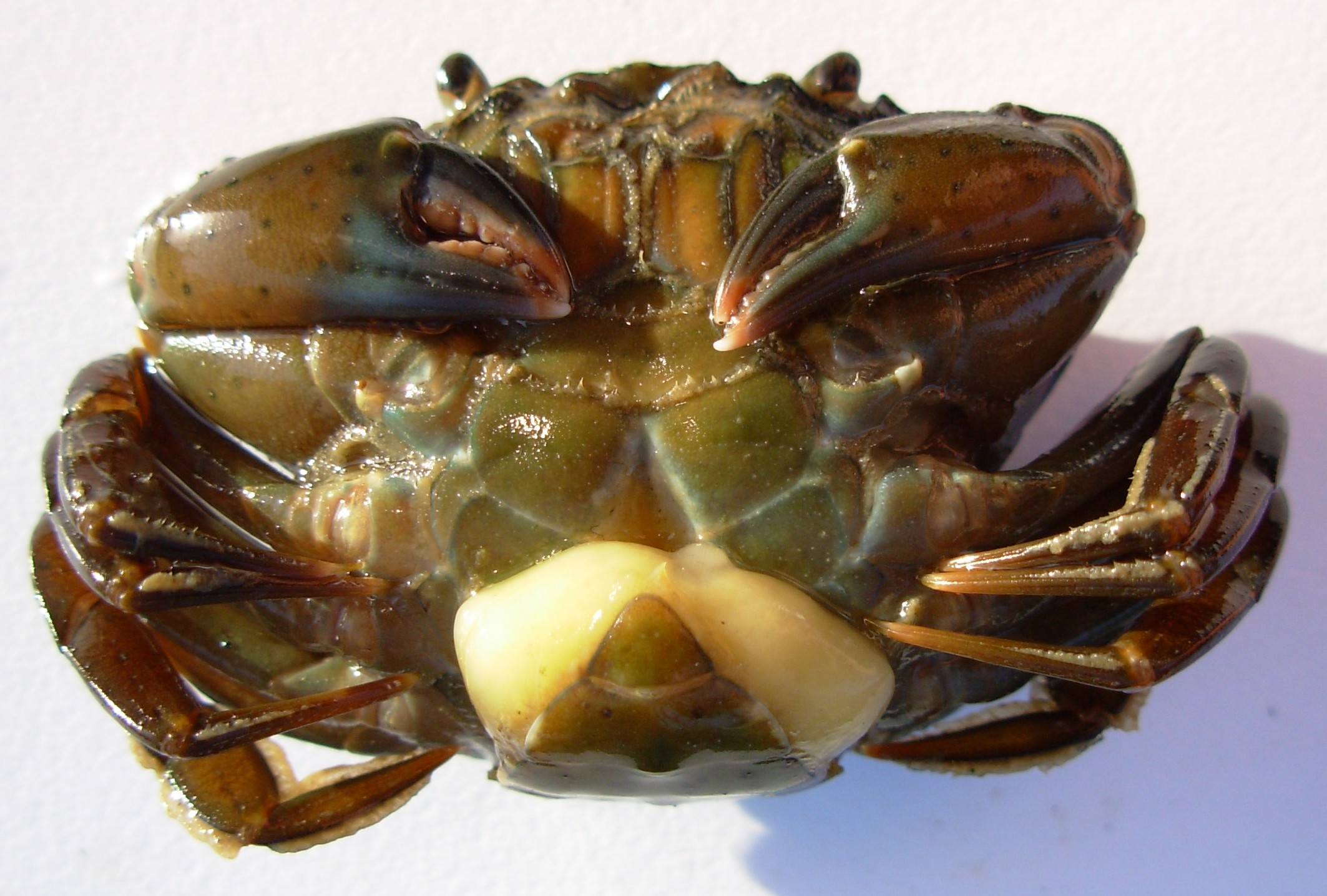
Sacculina carcini on host (Kentrogonida)

== Phylogeny ==
The Rhizocephala have not so far been found as fossils.

=== External ===
The following cladogram shows the phylogenetic relationships of the Cirripedia within Thecostraca as of 2021.

- Thecostraca
  - Facetotecta
  - - Ascothoracida
    - Cirripedia barnacles
      - Acrothoracica
      - - sessile
          Thoracica (stalked and acorn barnacles)
        - parasitic
          Rhizocephala

=== Internal ===
The following cladogram summarizes the internal relationships of Rhizocephala as of 2020, as well as the number of species in each family. The tree is not fully resolved.

- Rhizocephala
  - Triangulidae (4)
  - - - "Akentrogonida" in part
        Mycetomorphidae (2)
      - Peltogastridae (47)
    - - Peltogasterellidae (10)
      - - Polyascidae (8)
        - - "Akentrogonida" in part
            - Clistosaccidae (2)
            - Polysaccidae (2)
            - Thompsoniidae (24)
            - - Pirusaccidae (1)
              - Duplorbidae (5)
              - Chthamalophilidae (4)
      - - Parthenopeidae (3)
        - Sacculinidae (177)

== See also ==
- List of Cirripedia genera
