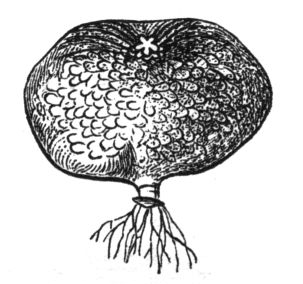
- Drawing of the externa of C. paguri

Scientific classification
- Domain: Eukaryota
- Kingdom: Animalia
- Phylum: Arthropoda
- Class: Thecostraca
- Subclass: Cirripedia
- Family: Clistosaccidae
- Genus: Clistosaccus; Lilljeborg, 1861
- Species: C. paguri

Binomial name
- Clistosaccus paguri Lilljeborg, 1861

Synonyms
- Apeltes paguri Lilljeborg, 1861

= Clistosaccus =

Clistosaccus paguri

Genus of barnacles

Clistosaccus is a genus of barnacles which are parasitic on hermit crabs. It is a monotypic genus, and the single species is Clistosaccus paguri, which is found in the northern Atlantic Ocean and the northern Pacific Ocean.

== Taxonomy ==
In his 1861 paper, Wilhelm Lilljeborg described two new monotypic genera, Apeltes (with the species A. paguri) and Clistosaccus (with C. paguri), both collected from Pagurus hermit crabs. It was not until the 1920s that Hilbrand Boschma pointed out these two purported species, at the time placed in separate families, were but two distinct growth stages of the same organism and united them under Clistosaccus.

== Description ==
This parasitic barnacle starts life as an internal parasite in the abdomen of its host hermit crab. After about three months a protuberance, known as an "externa", pushes its way through the abdomen, usually on the left side. This bulge is at first globular, but elongates as it grows, becoming cylindrical. The mantle opening is at one end, and the parasite is attached to the host by a short, wide stalk about two thirds of the way towards the other end. The externa is white and can grow to a length of about 2.5 cm (1 in). Host hermit crabs include Pagurus bernhardus, Pagurus pubescens, and Pagurus dalli.

== Distribution and habitat ==
Clistosaccus paguri occurs in both the northern Atlantic Ocean and the northern Pacific Ocean. In the Atlantic its range extends from the White Sea to Nova Scotia, and in the Pacific, its range extends from Alaska and the Bering Sea to Kodiak Island, the Sea of Japan and the Sea of Okhotsk. Its depth range is down to about 1,000 m (3,300 ft).

== Life cycle ==
After an infective female cyprid larva has settled on a suitable host, it pierces the cuticle with its antennule and injects some cells into the abdomen of the hermit crab. These develop internally, sending out root-like processes into the surrounding tissues. The parasite has no gut, but after about three months, the externa pushes through the crab's abdomen. This is essentially a reproductive structure on a stalk, with a large ovary and a brood chamber. A male cyprid larva settles on the externa and fertilises the eggs by antennule penetration, the larvae developing inside the brood chamber. Here they develop directly into cyprid larvae, missing out the nauplius stage of more typical crustaceans. The cyprid larvae are at first unisex, becoming male or female according to what role they play in the reproductive cycle. The presence of this parasite effectively sterilises the host hermit crab, the gonads do not degenerate, but they fail to produce mature eggs and sperm.
