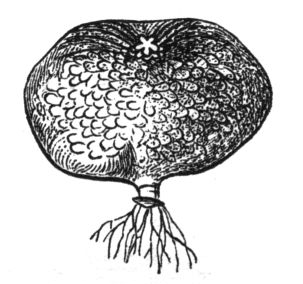
- Drawing of Clistosaccus paguri

Scientific classification
- Kingdom: Animalia
- Phylum: Arthropoda
- Clade: Pancrustacea
- Class: Thecostraca
- Subclass: Cirripedia
- Infraclass: Rhizocephala
- Family: Clistosaccidae; Boschma, 1928

Synonyms
- Sylonidae Boschma, 1928

= Clistosaccidae =

Family of barnacles

Clistosaccidae is a family of parasitic barnacles belonging to the highly apomorphic infraclass Rhizocephala, which is part of the barnacle subclass Cirripedia.

The family contains two genera:

- Clistosaccus Lilljeborg, 1861
- Sylon M. Sars, 1870
