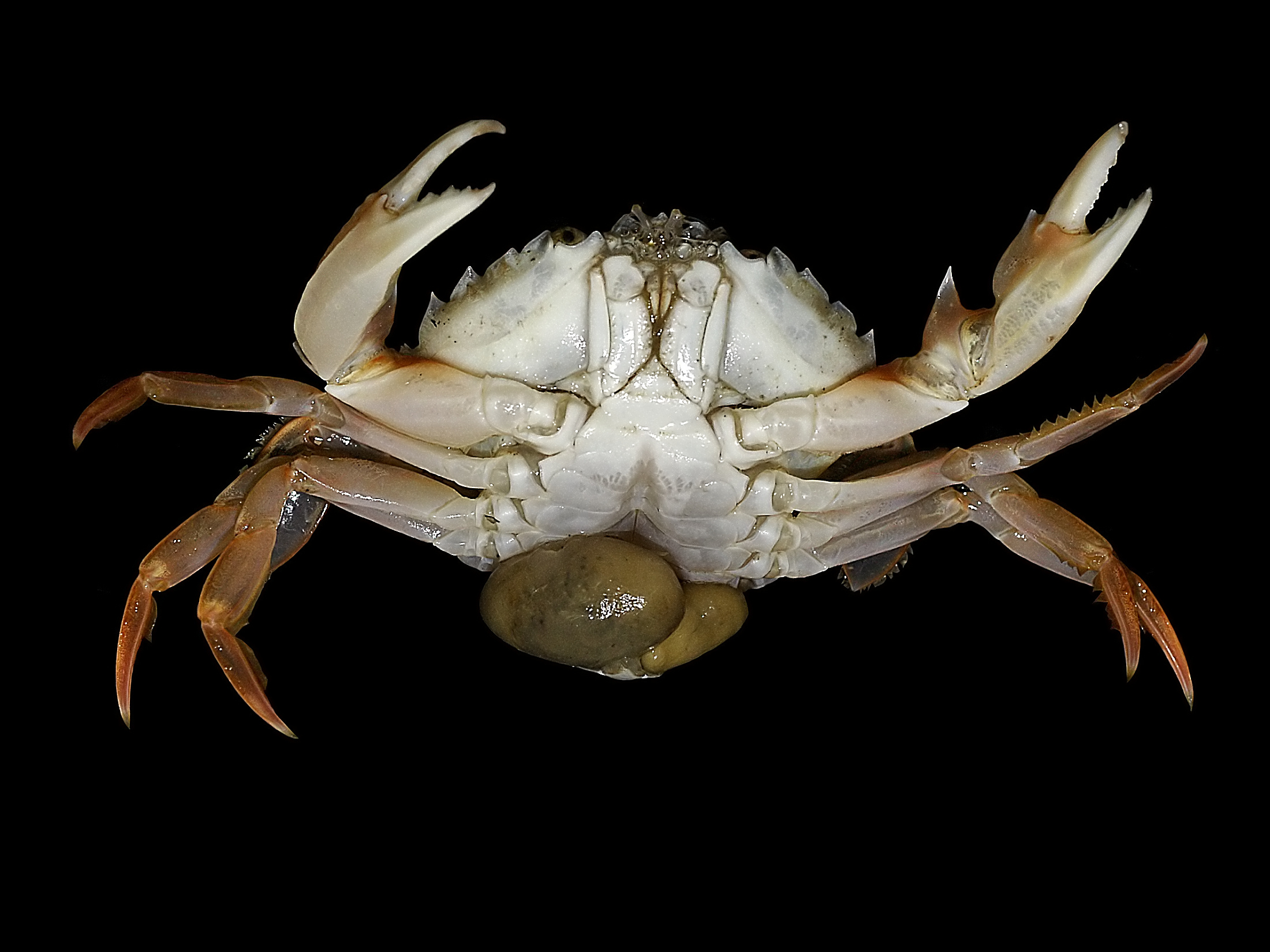
- Externae (brown lumps) of two mature female Sacculina individuals on a male Liocarcinus holsatus (Portunidae)

Scientific classification
- Kingdom: Animalia
- Phylum: Arthropoda
- Clade: Mandibulata
- Clade: Pancrustacea
- Superclass: Multicrustacea
- Class: Thecostraca
- Subclass: Cirripedia
- Infraclass: Rhizocephala
- Family: Sacculinidae; Lilljeborg, 1861

= Sacculinidae =

Family of barnacles

The Sacculinidae are a family of barnacles belonging to the parasitic and highly apomorphic infraclass Rhizocephala. The Sacculinidae is one of the two larger families of Rhizocephala, containing six genera:

- Drepanorchis Boschma, 1927
- Heterosaccus Smith, 1906
- Loxothylacus Boschma, 1928
- Ptychascus Boschma, 1933
- Sacculina Thompson, 1836
- Sesarmaxenos Annandale, 1911
