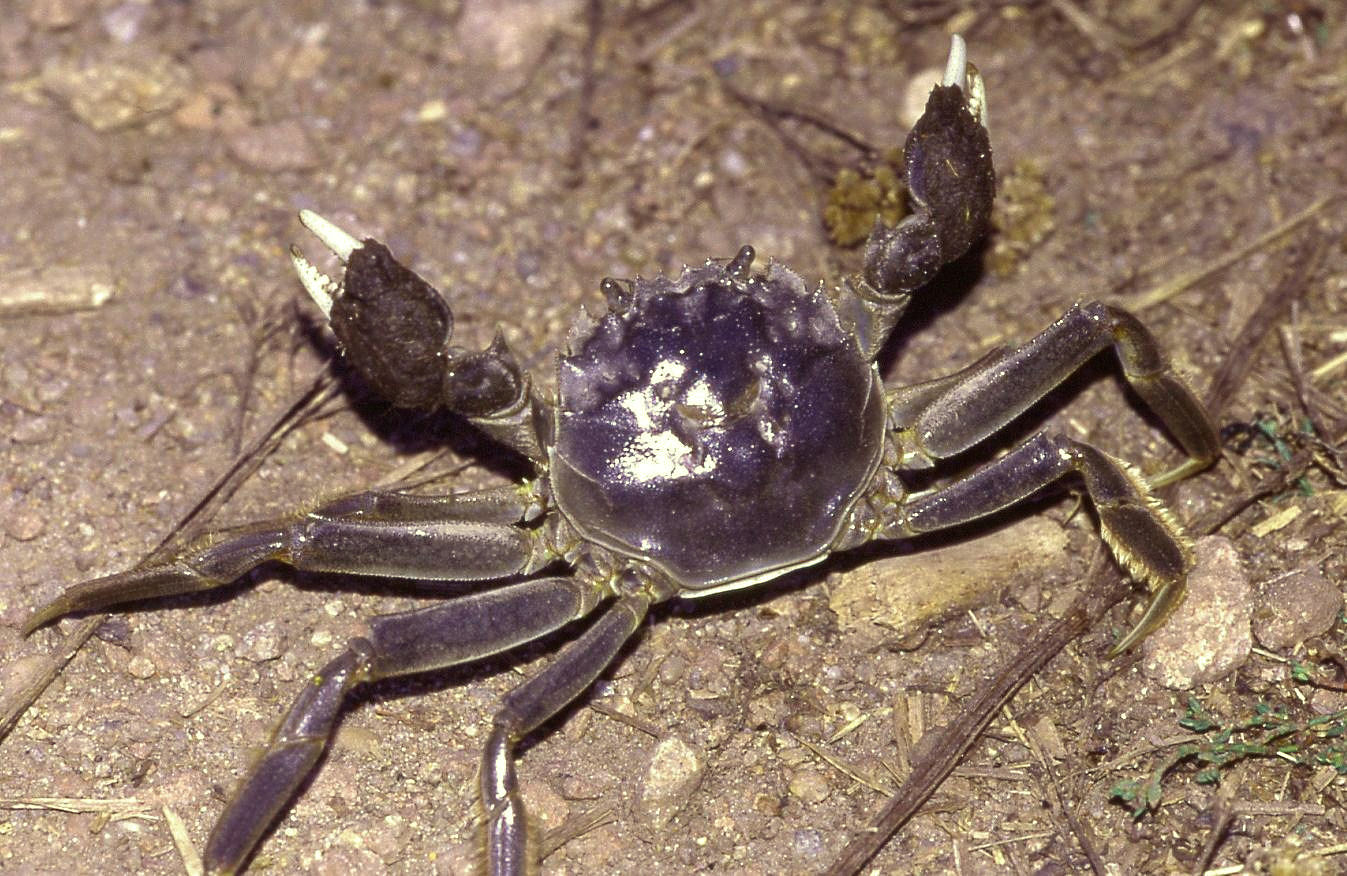

Scientific classification
- Kingdom: Animalia
- Phylum: Arthropoda
- Clade: Pancrustacea
- Class: Malacostraca
- Order: Decapoda
- Suborder: Pleocyemata
- Infraorder: Brachyura
- Family: Varunidae
- Genus: Eriocheir
- Species: E. sinensis

Binomial name
- Eriocheir sinensis H. Milne-Edwards, 1853

= Chinese mitten crab =

Species of crab

"Chinese mitten crab"

Chinese name
- Traditional Chinese: 大閘蟹
- Simplified Chinese: 大闸蟹
Transcriptions
Standard Mandarin
- Hanyu Pinyin: dà zhá xiè

Alternative Chinese name
- Chinese: 上海毛蟹
Transcriptions
Standard Mandarin
- Hanyu Pinyin: shànghǎi máo xiè

Korean name
- Hangul: 참게
Transcriptions
- Revised Romanization: Chamge
- McCune–Reischauer: Ch'amge

Capture (blue) and aquaculture (green) production of Chinese mitten crab (Eriocheir sinensis) in thousand tonnes from 1990 to 2022, as reported by the FAO

Eriocheir sinensis, the Chinese mitten crab (simplified Chinese: 大闸蟹; traditional Chinese: 大閘蟹; pinyin: dàzháxiè; Jyutping: daai6 zaap6 haai5; Shanghainese: du^{6}-zaq^{8}-ha^{5}, lit. big sluice crab; Korean: 참게) or Shanghai hairy crab (上海毛蟹, p Shànghǎi máoxiè), is a medium-sized burrowing crab named for its furry claws, which resemble mittens. It is native to rivers, estuaries, and other coastal habitats of East Asia, from Korea in the north to Fujian in the south. It has also been introduced to Europe and North America, where it is considered an invasive species. The species features on the list of invasive alien species of Union concern. This means that the import of the species and trade in the species is forbidden in all of the European Union.

== Description ==
This species' distinguishing features are the dense patches of dark setae (the "fur") on its claws. The crab's body is the size of a human palm, and the legs are about twice as long as the 3–10-centimeter (1–4 in) wide carapace.

== Distribution ==
The Chinese mitten crab originates from Hong Kong to the border of Korea. It can be found inland, but prefers coastal areas. In the Yangtze, the largest river in its native range, Chinese mitten crabs have been recorded up to 1,400 km (760 nmi) upstream. It is known to settle in rice fields by the sea and rivers inland. The crab is found in both subtropical and temperate regions.

== Biology ==
The mitten crab is omnivorous. Their main prey consists of worms, mussels, snails, dead organic material, and other small crustaceans and fish.

An increase in microplastics has had a significant impact on the population, as it affects their metabolism, growth, and oxidative stress response in the liver.

=== Reproduction ===
Chinese mitten crabs spend most of their lives in fresh water and return to the sea to breed (catadromous). Spawning crabs average around 5.5 cm (2 1/4 in) in length. In late August, sexual instincts awaken and they begin migrating downstream to the sea, away from their feeding grounds. During this migration, the crabs reach puberty and develop their sex organs. The crabs begin to breed in the brackish waters in late fall. The males arrive first and stay in the brackish waters all winter; the females arrive after. The eggs are laid within 24 hours of mating, then attached to the abdomen of the female. After the eggs are attached, the female leaves immediately, heading to the mouth of the river. The larvae hatch from the eggs during the summer, after which they float and drift about the brackish waters. Because the journey to breed for crabs is so great, they only breed once during their lifetimes. The breeding age is normally toward the end of their lifespans. The crabs have sizable egg production count since they only breed once. After the crabs successfully reproduce, they have very little energy and begin to waste away.

Different life stages of the mitten crab:

1. Eggs require pure salt water to mature.
2. Larvae hatch from the eggs in brackish waters.
3. The larvae gradually move from brackish water to fresh water.
4. The final stage of the larvae is the megalopa, which is 3–4 millimeters (1/8–5/32 in) in length.
5. The megalopa then develop into small mitten crabs in the fresh water.

=== Invasiveness ===
This species of crab has been introduced from Asia (China and Korea) to North America and Europe, where it spreads rapidly, raising concerns that it competes with local species, and its burrowing nature damages embankments and clogs drainage systems. The crabs can make significant inland migrations. In 1995, residents of Greenwich were reported to have seen Chinese mitten crabs coming out of the River Thames, and in 2014, one was found in the Clyde, in Scotland. The crabs have also been known to take up residence in swimming pools. In some places, the crabs have been found hundreds of miles from the sea. Concern has arisen in areas with a substantial native crab fishery, such as the Chesapeake Bay in Maryland and the Hudson River in New York (both locations where the crabs were first spotted in 2005), as the impact of the invasion by this species on the native population is unknown.

Import, transport, or possession of live Chinese mitten crabs is illegal in the United States, as accidental release or escape risks spreading these crabs to uninfested waters. In addition, some states may have their own restrictions on possession of mitten crabs. California allows fishing for mitten crabs with some restrictions. The Chinese mitten crab has been introduced into the Great Lakes several times, but has not yet been able to establish a permanent population.

The Smithsonian is tracking the spread of the Chinese mitten crab and seeking help to determine their current distribution status along all coasts of North America, especially Chesapeake Bay, Delaware Bay, Hudson River, and San Francisco Bay. People are encouraged to report any mitten crab sightings, along with details (date, specific location, size) and a close-up photograph or specimen if possible. The first confirmed record along the East Coast of the United States was in the Chesapeake Bay near Baltimore, Maryland, in 2005.

Chinese mitten crabs have also invaded German waters, where they destroy fishing nets, hurt native fish species, and damage local dams, causing damage of up to 80 million euros. These crabs migrated from China to Europe as early as 1900 and were first documented by official German reports in 1912 from Aller River. After an investigation by German scientists in 1933, the crabs were thought to have migrated to Europe through ballast water in commercial ships. The crabs are the only freshwater crab species in Germany, and their tendency to dig holes has caused damage to industrial infrastructure and dams.

The first time the crab was brought to Europe was most likely by commercial vessels. Ships must fill their ballast water tanks, and one of these filling events could have been the spawning time for the mitten crab. Since the larvae are free floating and 1.7–5 millimeters (1/16–3/16 in) in size, they easily could have been swept into the ballast water tank. Once the ship reached Europe and emptied its tank, the crab larvae were released. Over time, this repetition would allow for a prominent mitten crab population in Europe. The crab has spread and can be found in continental Europe, the United States (San Francisco Bay), and the United Kingdom. A 15-year period in Germany when the crabs were gradually entering Europe is known as the "establishment phase".

==== Management efforts ====
Management efforts have been shown to be very difficult, due to its abundance, high reproductive rate, and high physiological tolerance. All the following efforts were attempted but showed little improvement - "catch as many as you can", migration barriers, trapping, raising awareness, and electrical screens and pulses.

Discussion of capturing the breeding crabs at the river mouths has occurred, but difficulties in carrying out this plan have arisen. Other strategies such as capturing them when they pile up at dams have proven somewhat effective. The problem arises when the crabs climb the walls of the dams and over into the rivers behind the dams.

== Relation to humans ==
Crabs are an autumnal delicacy in Shanghai cuisine and eastern China. They are prized for the female crab roe, which ripens in the ninth lunar month and the males in the 10th. The crab meat is believed by traditional Chinese medicine practitioners to have a "cooling" (yin) effect on the body.

Crabs from Yangcheng Lake are especially prized, since they are perceived to have sweeter meat. Most of the Yangcheng crabs are exported to Shanghai, Hong Kong, and high-profit foreign markets. Responding to the spread of the crab to the West, businessmen have started seeing it as a new source of crab for the Chinese market. One proposed scheme involves importing unwanted crabs from Europe, where they are seen as a pest, to replenish local pure-bred stock.

Mitten crabs have exhibited a remarkable ability to survive in highly modified aquatic habitats, including polluted waters. Like some fish, they can also easily tolerate and take up heavy metals, such as cadmium and mercury. Therefore, the farming and postharvesting of the species needs proper management if it is used as a food. Concerns have been raised that the population and origin of the crab may be affected because of over-fishing of the species in the Yangtze.

In 2010, a Chinese businessman introduced vending machines to sell this species of crab in the subways. The crabs are stored at 5 °C (41 °F), which induces a sleep-like state.

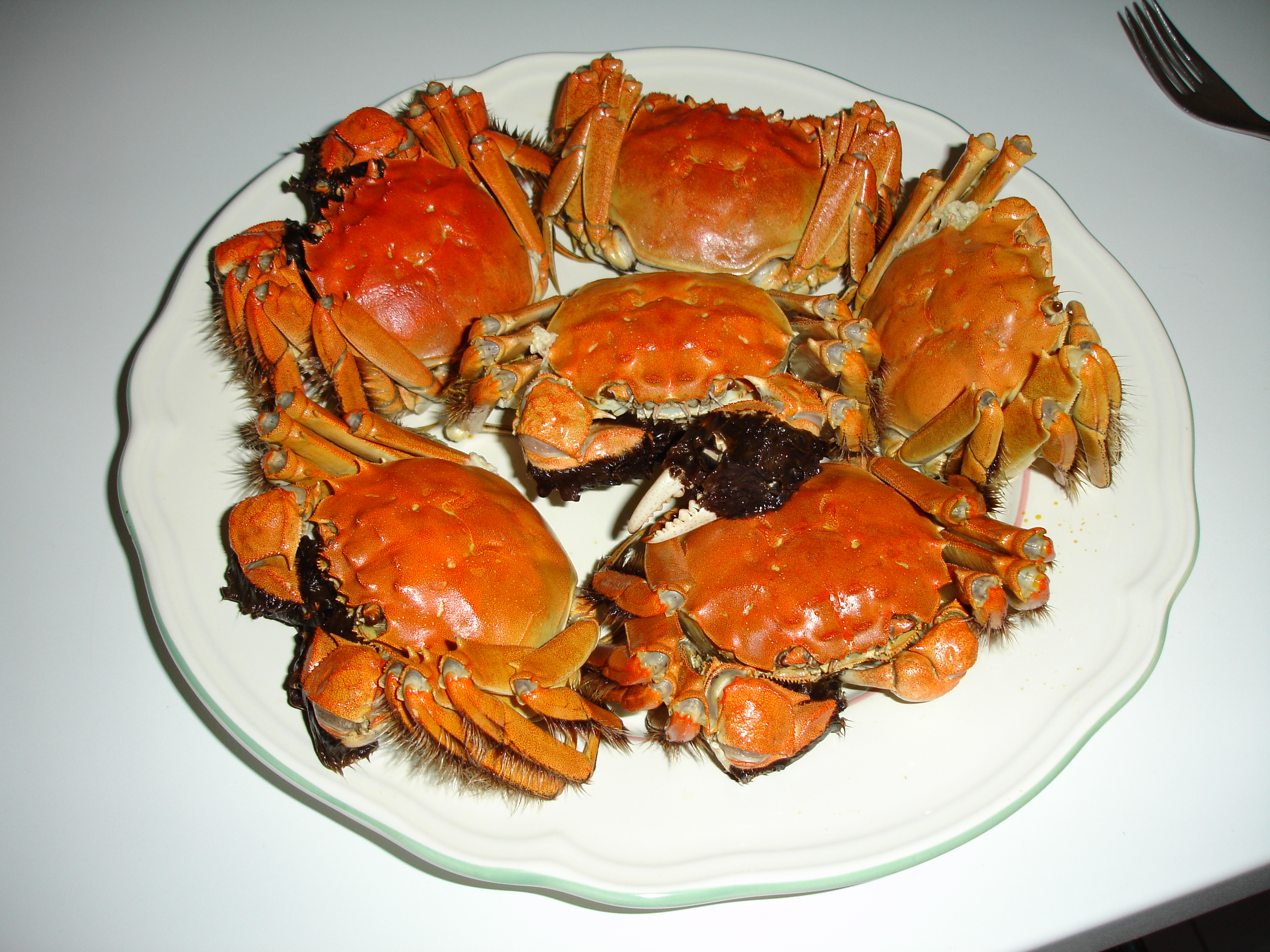
Hairy crab is an important part of Shanghai cuisine

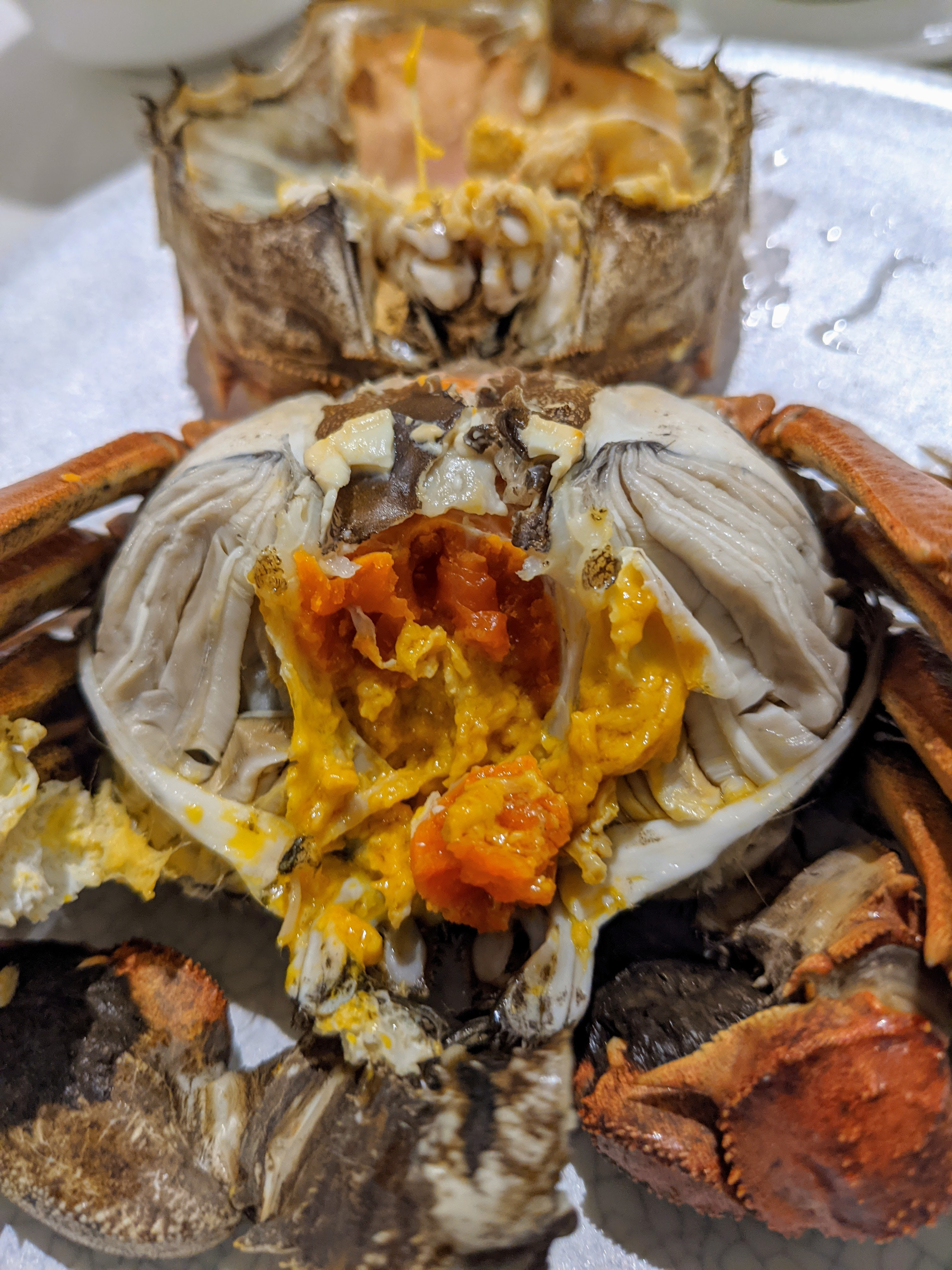
Close-up of the roe inside a steamed female crab

=== Counterfeit Yangcheng Lake crabs ===
Counterfeit crabs are a problem in the hairy crab industry. Due to the high demand for them, specifically from Yangcheng Lake, many vendors sell hairy crabs from other lakes and claim they are authentic Yangcheng Lake hairy crabs. Although only 3,000 tons of Yangcheng Lake hairy crabs were harvested in 2012, more than 100,000 tons of supposed "Yangcheng" crabs were sold.

"Bathing crabs" are hairy crabs sourced from elsewhere that are temporarily placed in Yangcheng Lake and then fraudulently sold as genuine Yangcheng Lake hairy crabs.

Identifying counterfeit crabs is a hard task, as the Yangcheng Lake hairy crabs look exactly like other hairy crabs. Technology has been implemented to identify fake hairy crabs, such as laser tags, prints, and barcodes, but these are easily forged. Blockchain-based tracing has also been implemented, where caught crabs are entered into a blockchain. Efforts to combat bathing crabs are ongoing.
