= Kentrogonida =

Order of crustaceans

Kentrogonida was formerly a suborder of barnacles belonging to the group Rhizocephala, now an infraclass. In research published by Chan et al. in 2021, the suborders Kentrogonida and Akentrogonida were removed from the infraclass Rhizocephala, leaving 13 families as children of Rhizocephala without intermediate orders or suborders.
