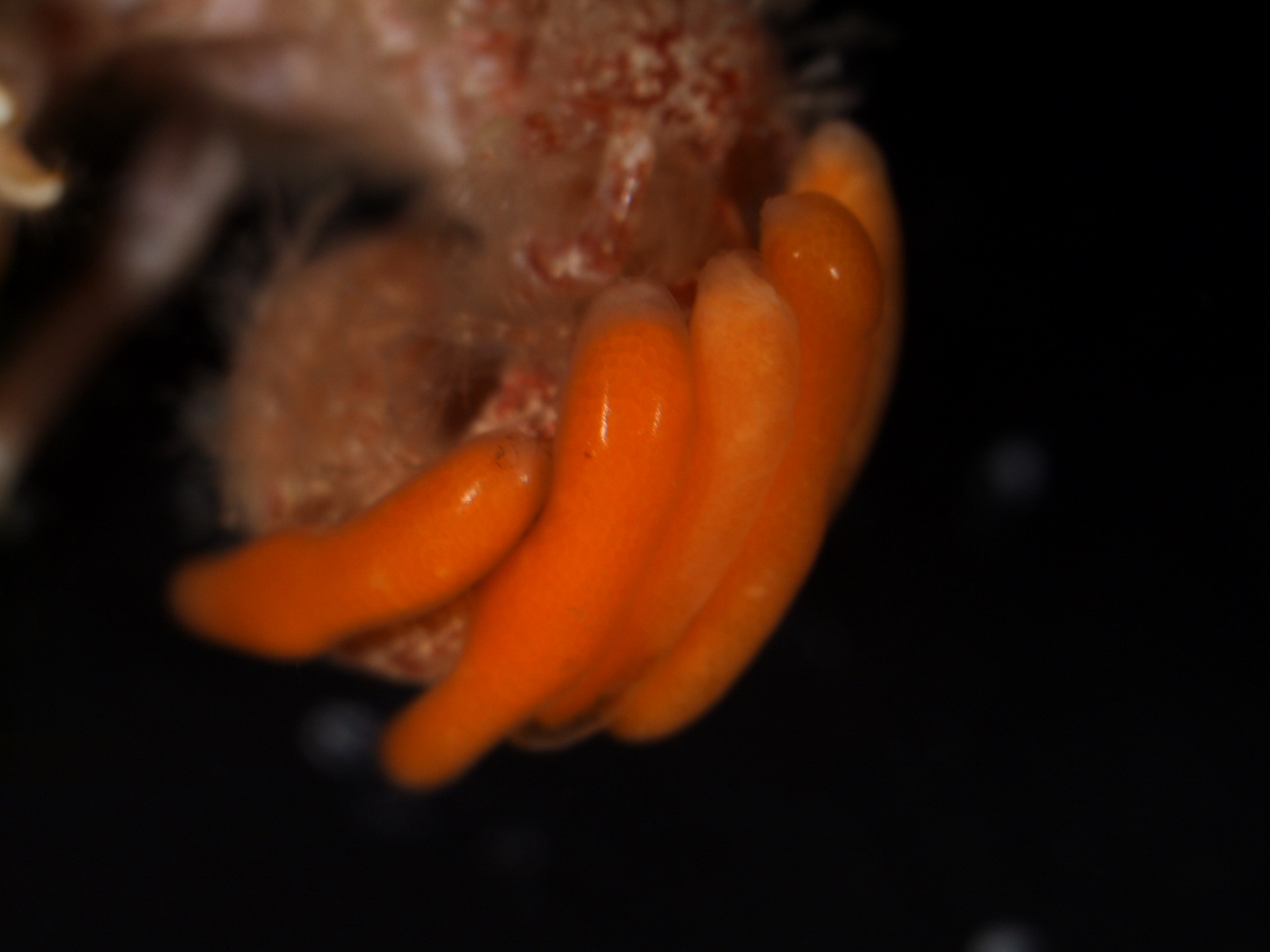
- Peltogasterella sulcata

Scientific classification
- Kingdom: Animalia
- Phylum: Arthropoda
- Class: Thecostraca
- Subclass: Cirripedia
- Infraclass: Rhizocephala
- Family: Peltogasterellidae; Høeg & Glenner, 2019

= Peltogasterellidae =

Family of crustaceans

Peltogasterellidae is a small family of parasitic barnacles in the class Thecostraca. There 4 genera and about 10 described species in Peltogasterellidae.

== Genera ==
These genera belong to the family Peltogasterellidae:

- Angulosaccus Reinhard, 1944
- Boschmaia Reinhard, 1958
- Cyphosaccus Reinhard, 1958
- Peltogasterella Krüger, 1912
