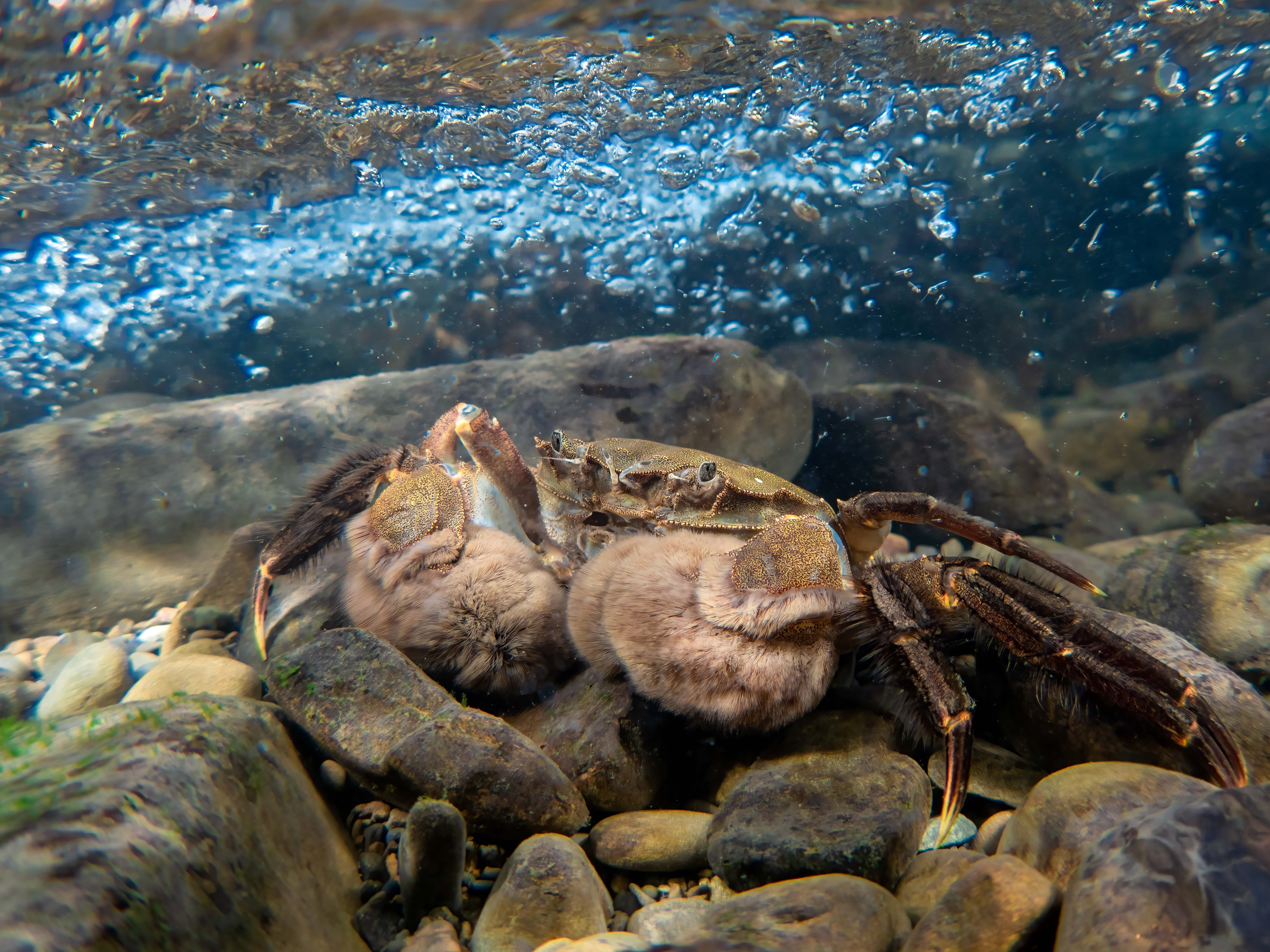

Scientific classification
- Kingdom: Animalia
- Phylum: Arthropoda
- Class: Malacostraca
- Order: Decapoda
- Suborder: Pleocyemata
- Infraorder: Brachyura
- Family: Varunidae
- Genus: Eriocheir
- Species: E. japonica

Binomial name
- Eriocheir japonica De Haan, 1835

Synonyms
- Eriocheir japonicus (De Haan, 1835); Eriochirus japonicus (De Haan, 1835); Grapsus (Eriocheir) japonicus De Haan, 1835; Eriocheir formosa Nakagawa, 1915; Eriocheir rectus Stimpson, 1858

= Japanese mitten crab =

Species of crab

The Japanese mitten crab (Eriocheir japonica), is a species of crab native to Korea and Japan. It is catadromous, being usually found in freshwater and brackish environments, but moving downstream into coastal marine environments to breed.

It is commonly eaten and economically important in its native range.

== Distribution ==
The species is found in Japan, Korea, western Taiwan and the southeastern coast of Russia. Sporadic introduced populations are also present in the United States, and a degree of introgression of the species has occurred in the invasive European populations of its close congener, the Chinese mitten crab.

== Gallery ==
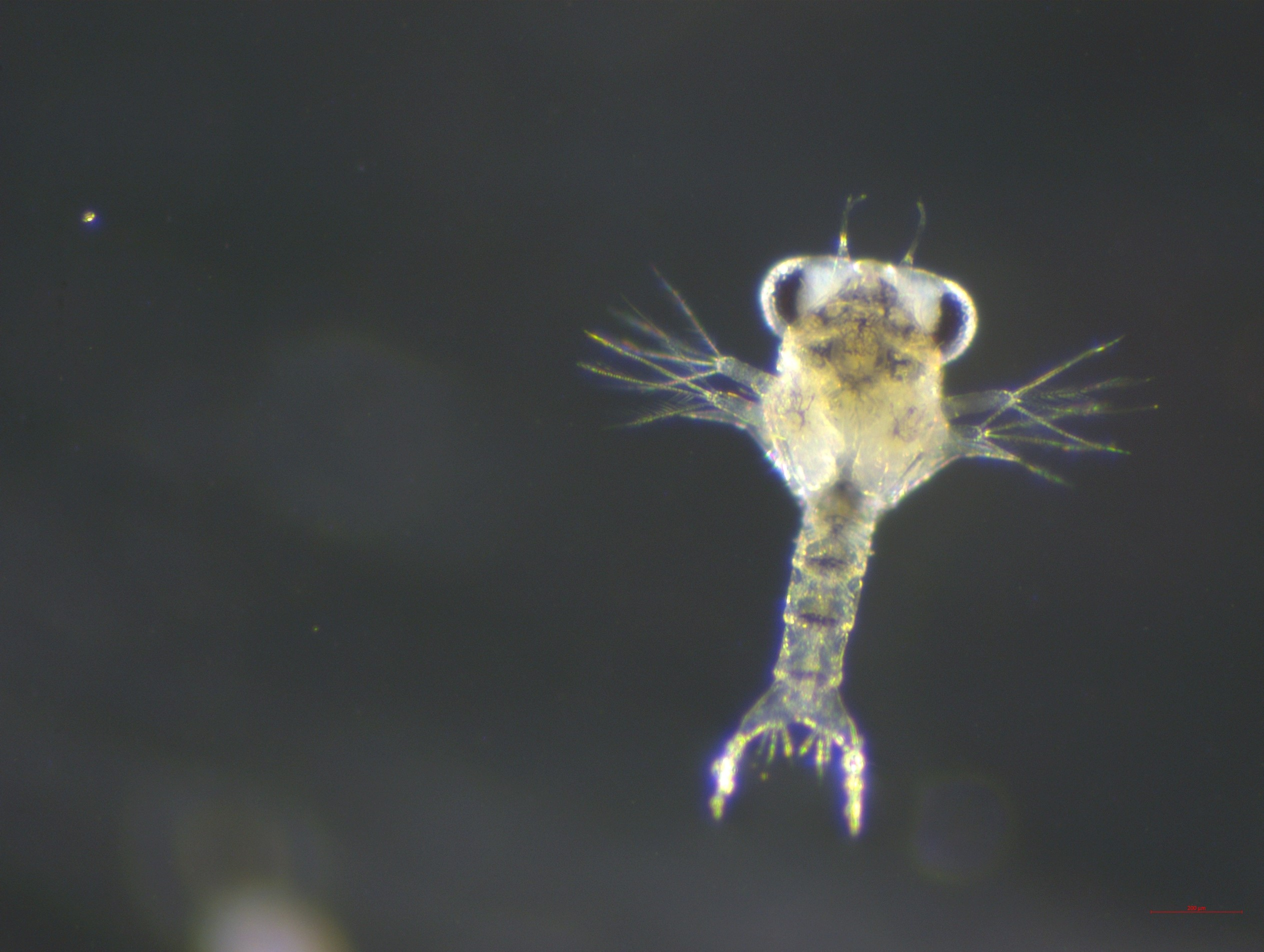
Larva

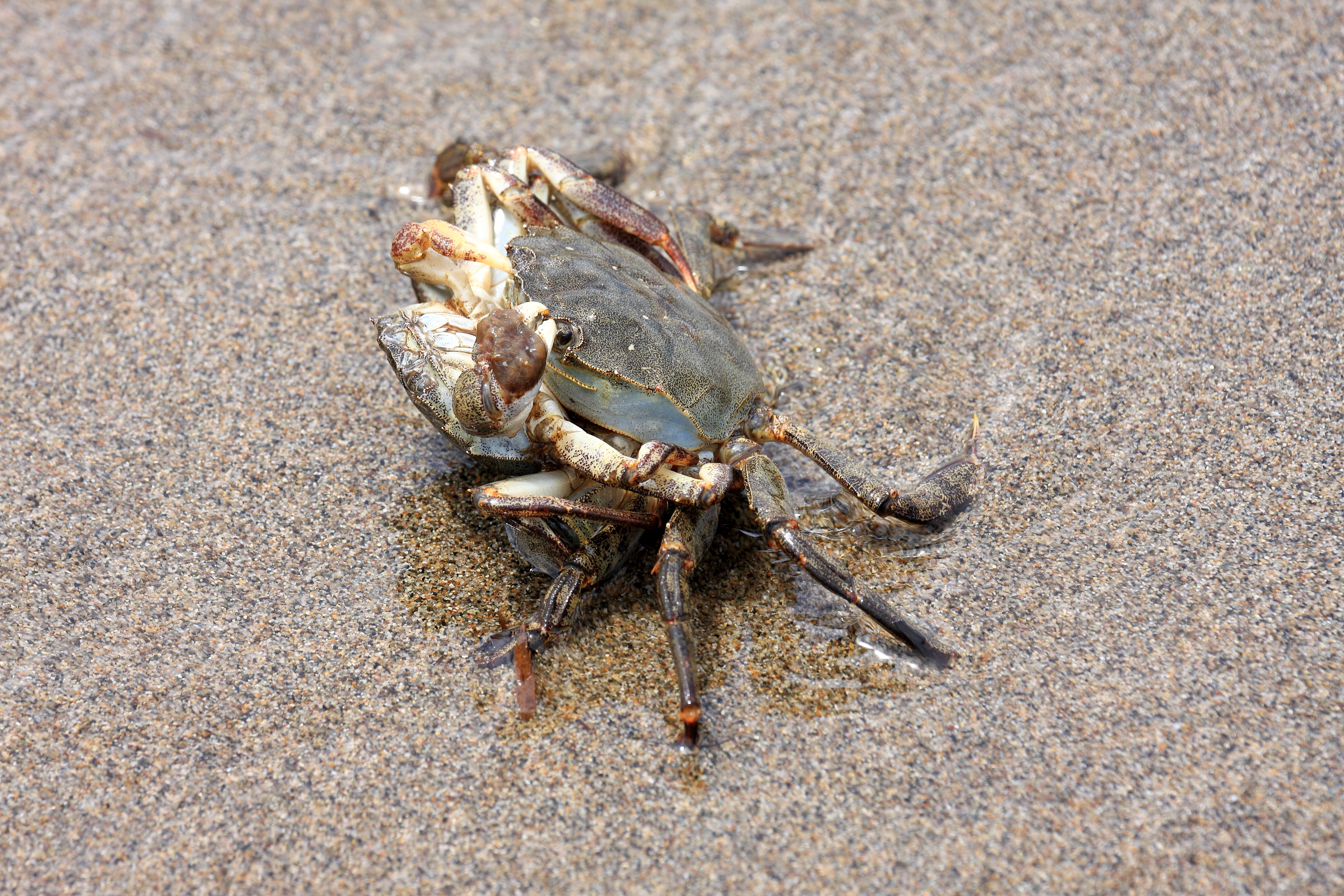
Mating

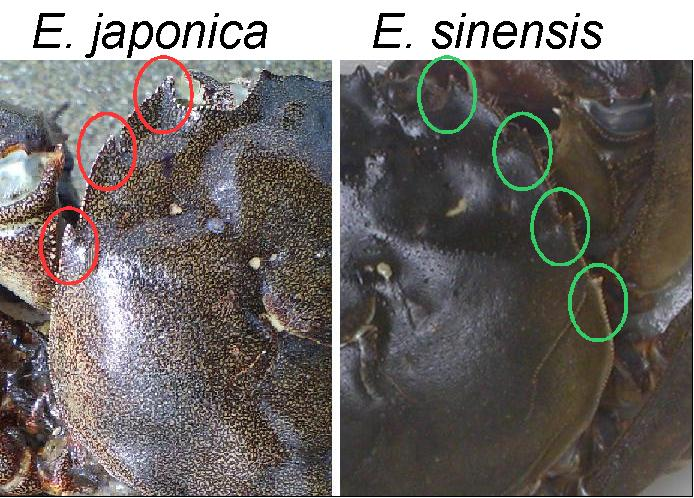
Comparison to the Chinese mitten crab (right)
