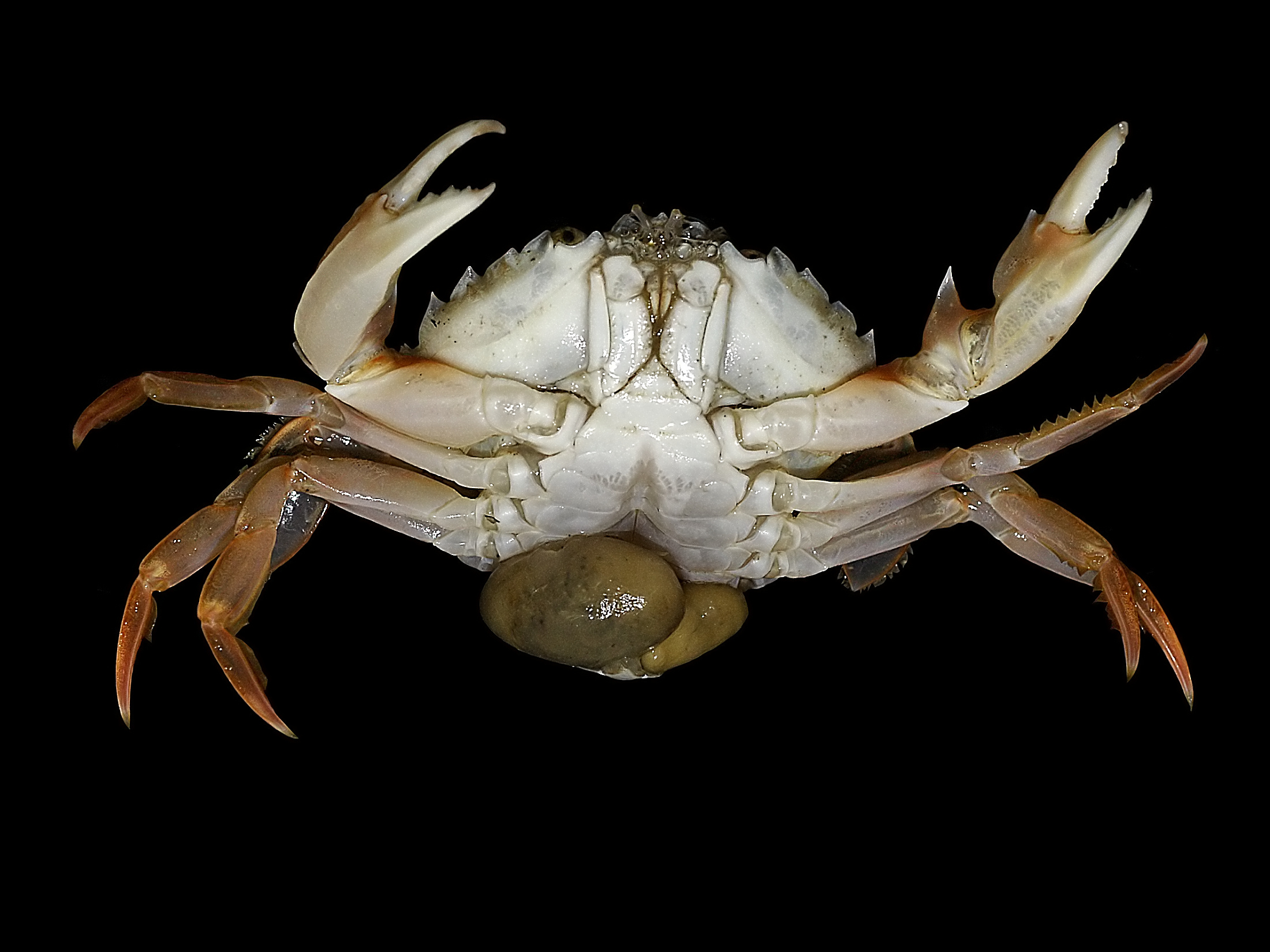
- Sacculina carcini on a male swimming crab

Scientific classification
- Kingdom: Animalia
- Phylum: Arthropoda
- Clade: Pancrustacea
- Class: Thecostraca
- Subclass: Cirripedia
- Infraclass: Rhizocephala
- Family: Sacculinidae
- Genus: Sacculina; Thompson, 1836

Type species
- Sacculina carcini Thompson, 1836

= Sacculina =

Genus of crustaceans

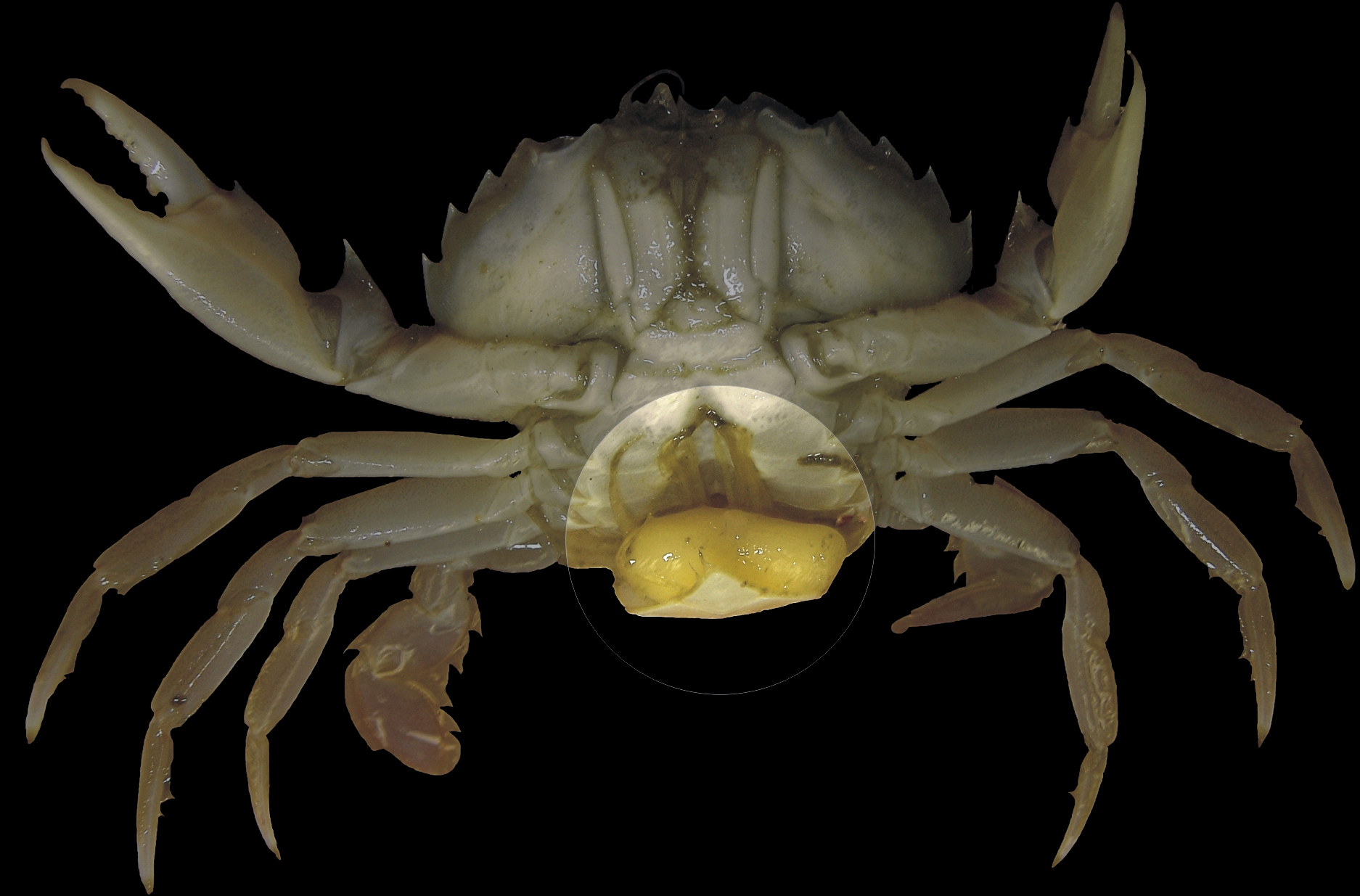
Sacculina

Sacculina is a genus of barnacles that is a parasitic castrator of crabs. They belong to a group called Rhizocephala. The adults bear no resemblance to the barnacles that cover ships, whales, and piers; they are recognised as barnacles because their larval forms are like other members of the barnacle class Cirripedia. The prevalence of this crustacean parasite in its crab host can be as high as 50%.

== Habitat ==
Sacculina live in a marine environment. During their larval stage they are pelagic, but as they form into adults they live as ectoparasites on crabs. Their primary host is the green crab, which is native to the Eastern Atlantic Ocean. Though these crabs have spread to other bodies of water, it is not believed that Sacculina barnacles have traveled with them to these new localities.

== Anatomy ==
The body of the adult parasite can be divided into two parts: one part is called the "externa" where the bulbous reproductive organ of the parasite sticks out of the abdomen of the host. The other part is called the "interna" which is inside the host's body. This part is composed of root-like tendrils that wrap themselves around the host's organs, which gives its group name of Rhizocephala, meaning "root-head". Through microCT scans, these roots have been discovered to wrap around certain organs of the body, with most around the hepatopancreas of crustaceans. This area is primarily for absorbing nutrients, which would explain why most concentrate in that region. In a similar species called Briarosaccus roots were seen extending to the brain and central nervous system, which is a hypothesis to help explain how parasites like these can manipulate their hosts' behavior.

== Life cycle ==
The female Sacculina larva finds a crab and walks on it until she finds a joint. She then molts into a form called a kentrogon, which then injects her soft body into the crab while her shell falls off. The Sacculina grows in the crab, emerging as a sac, known as an externa, on the underside of the crab's rear thorax, where the crab's eggs would be incubated. Parasitic Sacculina destroy a crab's genitalia, rendering the crab permanently infertile.

After this invasion of the Sacculina, the crab is unable to perform the normal function of molting. This results in a loss of nutrition for the crab, and impairs its overall growth. The natural ability of regrowing a severed claw that is commonly used for defense purposes is therefore lost after the infestation of Sacculina.

The male Sacculina 'larva' looks for a female Sacculina on the underside of a crab. He then implants his cells into a pocket in the female's body called the "testis", where the male cells then produce spermatozoa to fertilize eggs.

When a female Sacculina is implanted in a male crab, it interferes with the crab's hormonal balance. This sterilizes it and changes the bodily layout of the crab to resemble that of a female crab by widening and flattening its abdomen, among other things. The female Sacculina then forces the crab's body to release hormones, causing it to act like a female crab, even to the point of performing female mating dances. If the parasite is removed from the host, female crabs will normally regenerate new ovarian tissue, while males usually develop complete or partial ovaries instead of testes.

Although all energy otherwise expended on reproduction is directed to the Sacculina, the crab develops a nurturing behavior typical of a normal female crab. The natural hatching process of a crab consists of the female finding a high rock and grooming its brood pouch on its abdomen and releasing the fertilized eggs in the water through a bobbing motion. The female crab stirs the water with her claw to aid the flow of the water. When the hatching larvae of Sacculina are ready to emerge from the brood pouch of female Sacculina, the crab performs a similar process. The crab shoots them out in pulses, creating a large cloud of Sacculina larvae. The crab uses the familiar technique of stirring the water to aid in flow.

== Life span ==
Sacculina are primarily host dependent so their life span matches that of their hosts. Crabs usually have a life span anywhere from 1 to 2 years.

== Biological control agents ==
Sacculina has been suggested to be used as a type of biological control agent to help reduce the populations of the invasive green crab. This is controversial because Sacculina can also use native crab species as their host and there would be no way to control or stop them from attacking native species.

== Species ==
More than 100 species of Sacculina are currently recognised:

- Sacculina abyssicola Guérin-Ganivet 1911
- Sacculina actaeae Guérin-Ganivet 1911
- Sacculina aculeata Boschma, 1928
- Sacculina ales Kossmann, 1872
- Sacculina americana Reinhard, 1955
- Sacculina amplituba Phillips, 1978
- Sacculina anceps Boschma, 1931
- Sacculina angulata van Kampen & Boschma 1925
- Sacculina anomala Boschma, 1933
- Sacculina atlantica Boschma, 1927
- Sacculina beauforti Boschma, 1949
- Sacculina bicuspidata Boschma, 1931
- Sacculina bipunctata Kossmann, 1872
- Sacculina boschmai Reinhard, 1955
- Sacculina bourdoni Boschma, 1960
- Sacculina brevispina van Kampen & Boschma 1925
- Sacculina bucculenta Boschma, 1933
- Sacculina bursapastoris Kossmann, 1872
- Sacculina caelata Boschma, 1931
- Sacculina calappae van Kampen & Boschma 1925
- Sacculina calva Boschma, 1933
- Sacculina captiva Kossmann, 1872
- Sacculina carcini Thompson, 1836
- Sacculina carpiliae Guérin-Ganivet 1911
- Sacculina cartieri Kossmann, 1872
- Sacculina cavolinii Kossmann, 1872
- Sacculina comosa Boschma, 1931
- Sacculina compressa Boschma, 1931
- Sacculina confragosa Boschma, 1933
- Sacculina cordata Shiino, 1943
- Sacculina crucifera Kossmann, 1872
- Sacculina curvata Boschma, 1933
- Sacculina cuspidata Boschma, 1949
- Sacculina dayi Boschma, 1958
- Sacculina dentata Kossmann, 1872
- Sacculina docleae Huang & Lützen, 1998
- Sacculina duracina Boschma, 1933
- Sacculina echinulata van Kampen & Boschma 1925
- Sacculina elongata Boschma, 1933
- Sacculina eriphiae Smith, 1906
- Sacculina exarcuata Kossmann, 1872
- Sacculina fabacea Shiino, 1943
- Sacculina flacca Boschma, 1931
- Sacculina flexuosa Kossmann, 1872
- Sacculina gerbei Guérin-Ganivet 1911
- Sacculina ghanensis Boschma, 1971
- Sacculina gibba Boschma, 1933
- Sacculina glabra van Kampen & Boschma 1925
- Sacculina globularis Boschma, 1970
- Sacculina gonoplaxae Guérin-Ganivet 1911
- Sacculina gordonae Boschma, 1933
- Sacculina gracilis Boschma, 1931
- Sacculina granifera Boschma, 1973
- Sacculina granulosa Boschma, 1931
- Sacculina guineensis Boschma, 1971
- Sacculina hartnolli Boschma, 1965
- Sacculina herbstianodosa (Hesse, 1867)
- Sacculina hirsuta Boschma, 1925
- Sacculina hirta Boschma, 1933
- Sacculina hispida Boschma, 1928
- Sacculina holthuisi Boschma, 1956
- Sacculina hystrix van Kampen & Boschma 1925
- Sacculina ignorata Boschma, 1947
- Sacculina imberbis Shiino, 1943
- Sacculina inconstans Boschma, 1952
- Sacculina infirma Boschma, 1953
- Sacculina inflata Leuckart, 1859
- Sacculina insueta Boschma, 1966
- Sacculina irrorata Boschma, 1934
- Sacculina jamaicensis Boschma, 1966
- Sacculina lata Boschma, 1933
- Sacculina leopoldi Boschma, 1931
- Sacculina leptothrix Boschma, 1933
- Sacculina lobata Boschma, 1965
- Sacculina loricata Boschma 1955
- Sacculina margaritifera Kossmann, 1872
- Sacculina micracantha Boschma, 1931
- Sacculina microthrix Boschma, 1931
- Sacculina muricata Boschma, 1931
- Sacculina nectocarcini Gurney et al. 2006
- Sacculina nigra Shiino, 1943
- Sacculina nodosa Boschma, 1931
- Sacculina ornatula Boschma, 1951
- Sacculina ostracotheris Boschma, 1967
- Sacculina papposa van Kampen & Boschma 1925
- Sacculina pertenuis Boschma, 1933
- Sacculina phacelothrix Boschma, 1931
- Sacculina pilosa Kossmann, 1872
- Sacculina pilosella van Kampen & Boschma 1925
- Sacculina pinnotherae Shiino, 1943
- Sacculina pisiformis Kossmann, 1872
- Sacculina pistillata Boschma, 1952
- Sacculina pomum Kossmann, 1872
- Sacculina pugettiae Shiino, 1943
- Sacculina pulchella Boschma, 1933
- Sacculina punctata Boschma, 1934
- Sacculina pustulata Boschma, 1925
- Sacculina quadrialata Boyko & van der Meij, 2018
- Sacculina rathbunae Boschma, 1933
- Sacculina reinhardi Boschma 1955
- Sacculina reniformis Boschma, 1933
- Sacculina robusta Boschma, 1948
- Sacculina rotundata Miers, 1880
- Sacculina rugosa van Kampen & Boschma 1925
- Sacculina scabra Boschma, 1931
- Sacculina schmitti Boschma, 1933
- Sacculina scutigera Huang & Lützen, 1998
- Sacculina semistriata van Kampen & Boschma 1925
- Sacculina senta Boschma, 1933
- Sacculina serenei Boschma, 1954
- Sacculina setosa van Kampen & Boschma 1925
- Sacculina spectabilis Boschma, 1948
- Sacculina spinosa van Kampen & Boschma 1925
- Sacculina striata Boschma, 1931
- Sacculina sulcata van Kampen & Boschma 1925
- Sacculina surinamensis Boschma, 1966
- Sacculina teres Boschma, 1933
- Sacculina teretiuscula Boschma, 1931
- Sacculina ternatensis Boschma, 1950
- Sacculina upogebiae Shiino, 1943
- Sacculina vankampeni Boschma, 1931
- Sacculina verrucosa van Kampen & Boschma 1925
- Sacculina vieta Boschma, 1933
- Sacculina weberi Boschma, 1931
- Sacculina zariquieyi Boschma, 1947
