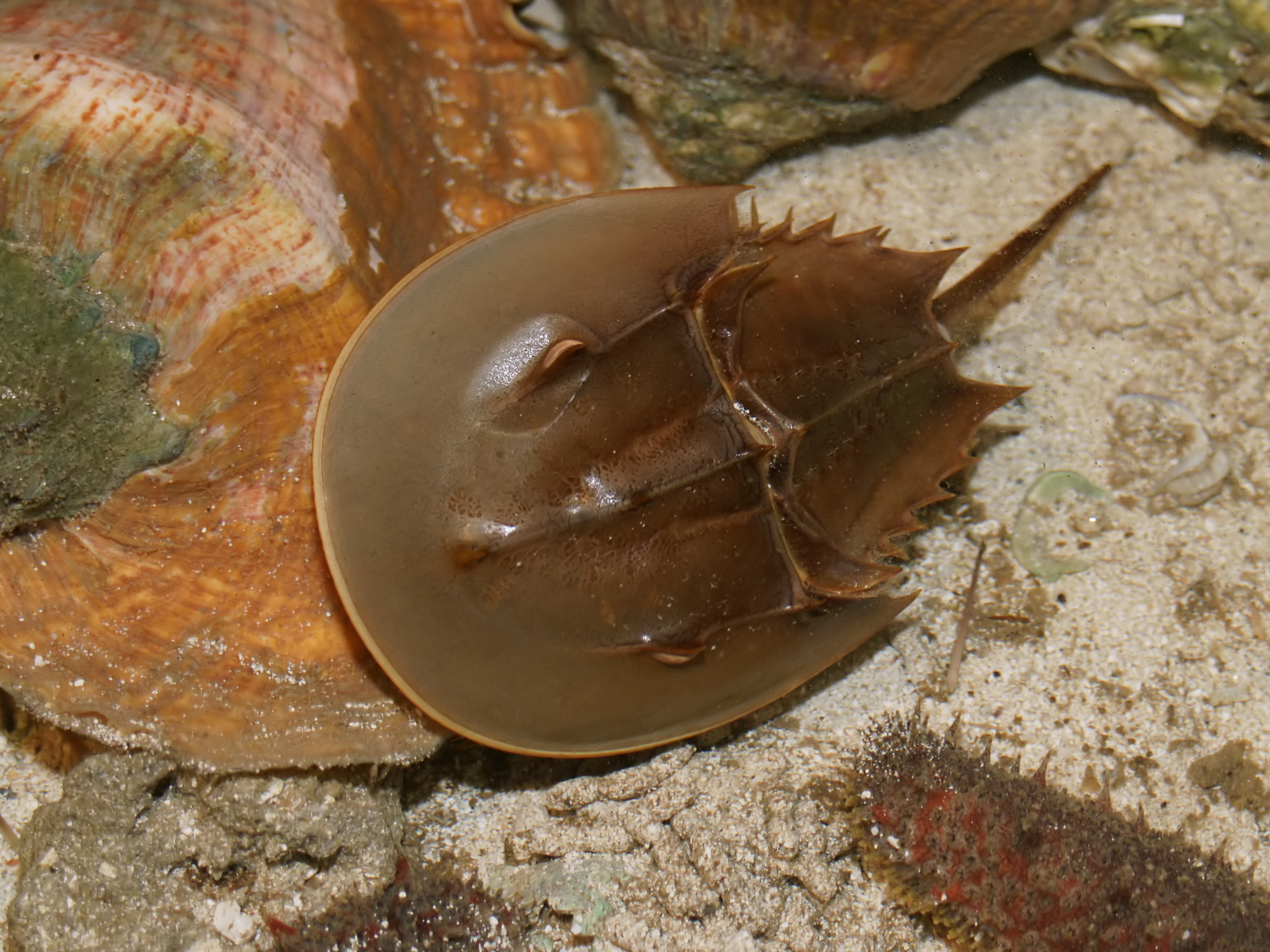
- St. Lucie County Aquarium, Florida

Conservation status
- Vulnerable (IUCN 3.1)

- Secure (NatureServe)

Scientific classification
- Kingdom: Animalia
- Phylum: Arthropoda
- Subphylum: Chelicerata
- Order: Xiphosura
- Family: Limulidae
- Genus: Limulus
- Species: L. polyphemus

Binomial name
- Limulus polyphemus (Linnaeus, 1758)

Synonyms
- Monoculus polyphemus Linnaeus, 1758; Cancer polyphemus Linnaeus, 1758

= Atlantic horseshoe crab =

Species of arthropod

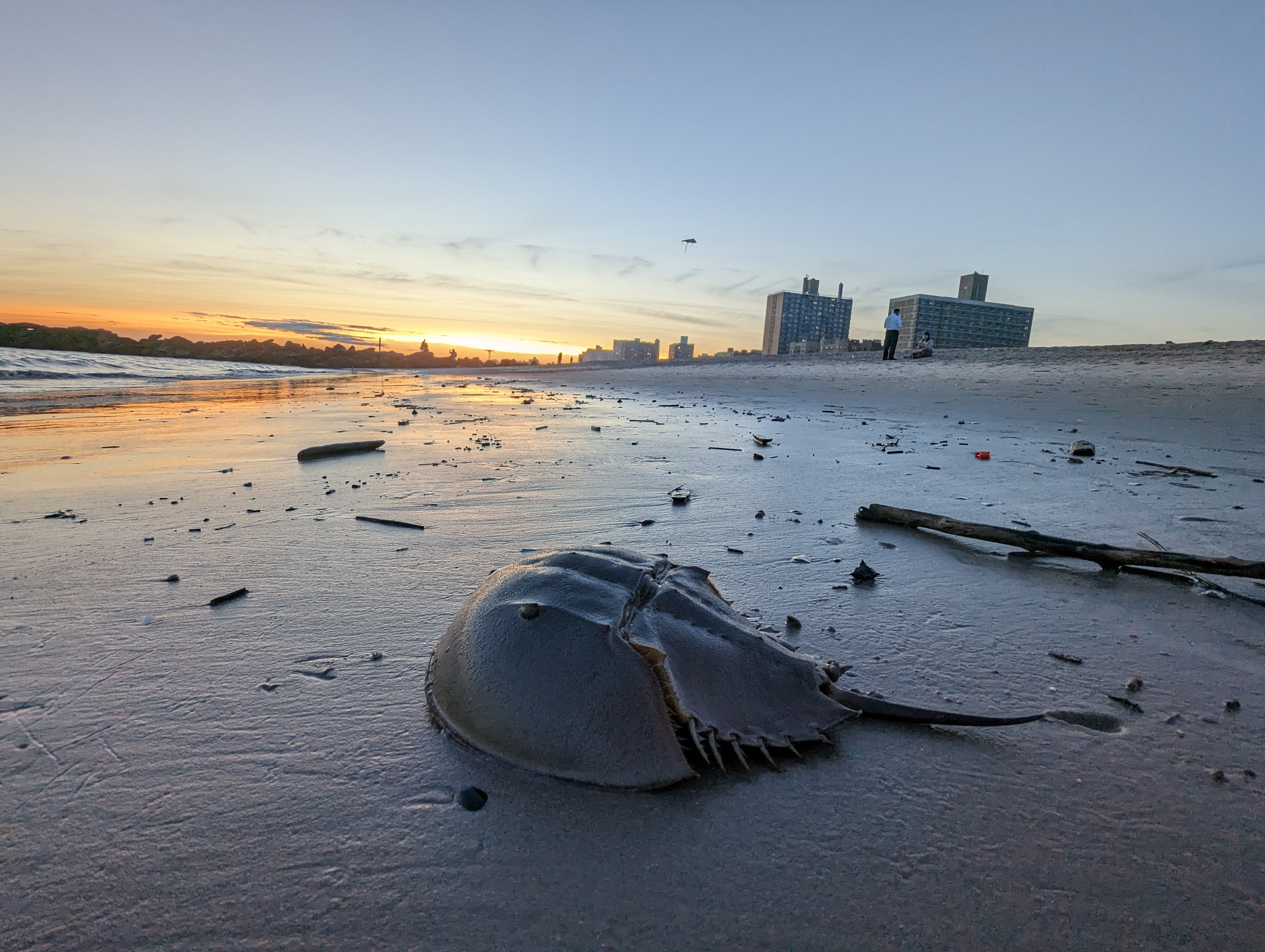
Atlantic horseshoe crab on the shore at Brighton Beach, New York City

The Atlantic horseshoe crab (Limulus polyphemus), also known as the American horseshoe crab, is a species of horseshoe crab, a kind of marine and brackish chelicerate arthropod. It is found in the Gulf of Mexico and along the Atlantic coast of North America. The main area of annual migration is Delaware Bay along the South Jersey Delaware Bayshore.

Their eggs were eaten by Native Americans, but today Atlantic horseshoe crabs are caught for use as fishing bait, in biomedicine (especially for Limulus amebocyte lysate) and science. They play a major role in the local ecosystems, with their eggs providing an important food source for shorebirds, and the juveniles and adults being eaten by sea turtles.

The other three extant (living) species in the family Limulidae are also called horseshoe crabs, but they are restricted to Asia. Horseshoe crabs, despite their common name, are not crustaceans, and are more closely related to arachnids like spiders and scorpions.

== Names and classification ==
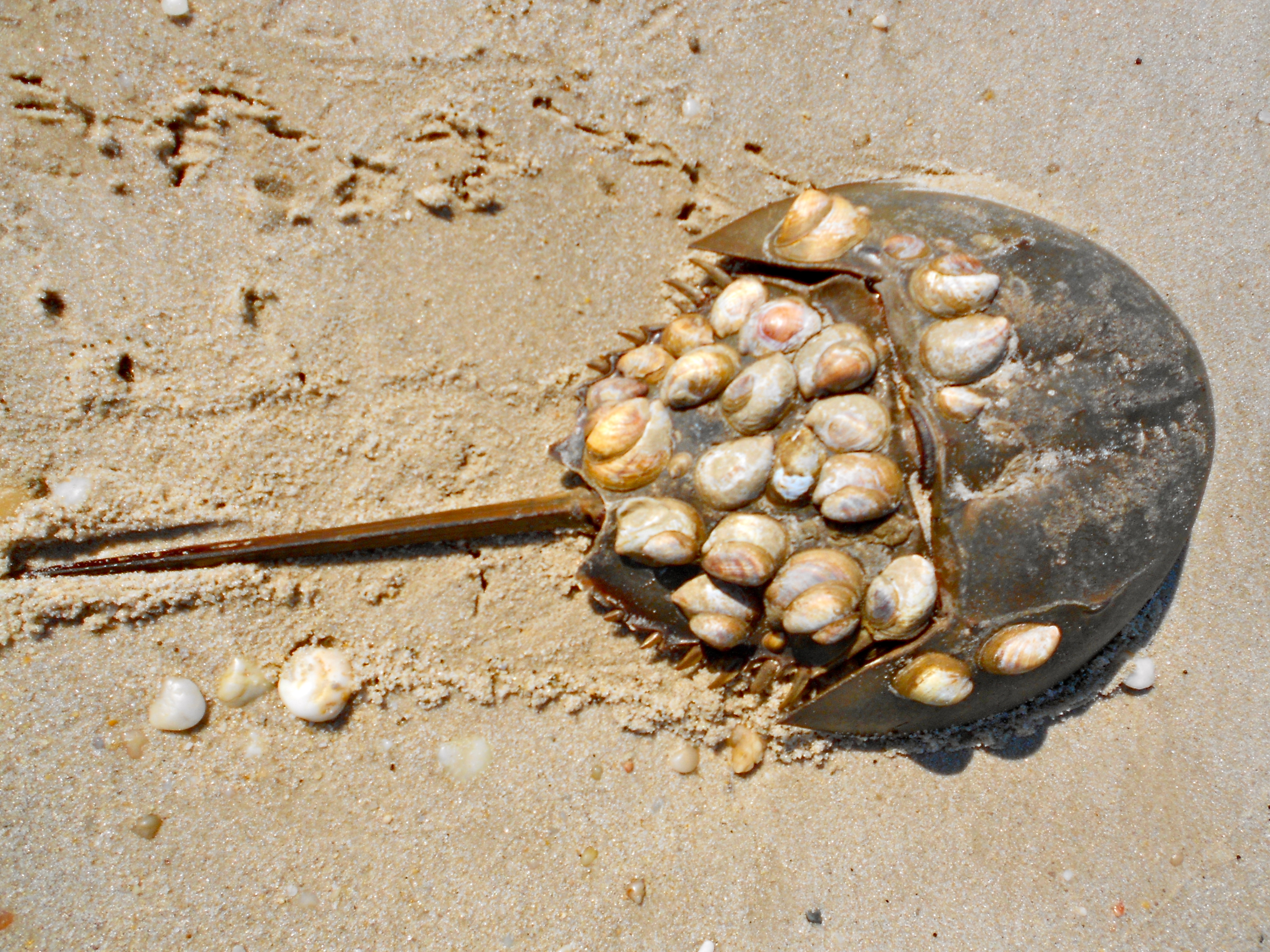
Atlantic horseshoe crab with attached Crepidula shells on the Delaware Bay beach in Villas, New Jersey.

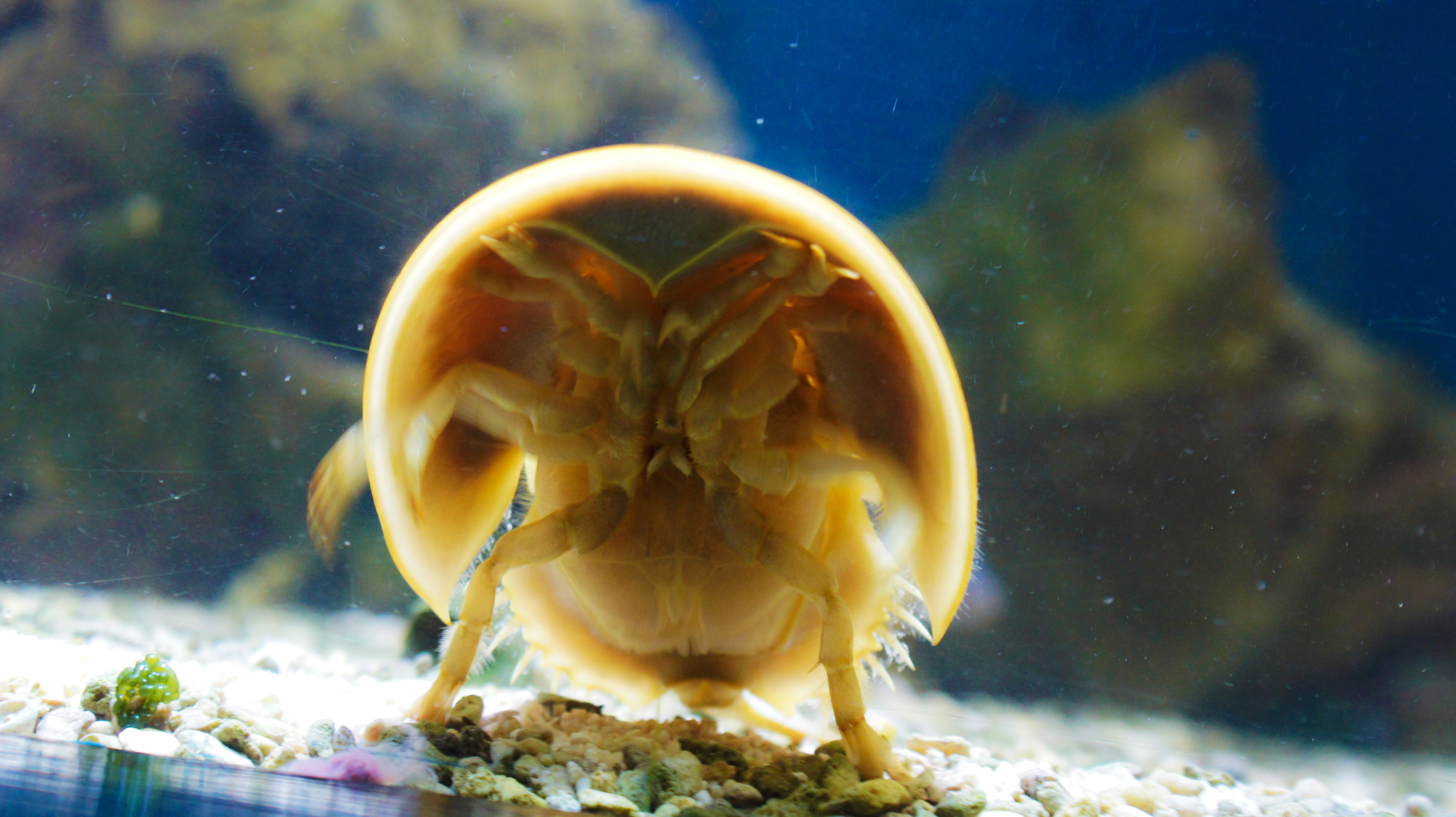
Underside view of a living male crab, showing the mouth, gills and legs

This group of animals is also known as horsefoot, or saucepan. Some people call the horseshoe crab a "helmet crab", but this common name is more frequently applied to a true crab, a malacostracan, of the species Telmessus cheiragonus. The term "king crab" is sometimes used for horseshoe crabs, but it is more usually applied to a group of decapod crustaceans.

Limulus means "askew" and polyphemus refers to Polyphemus, a giant in Greek mythology. It is based on the misconception that the animal had a single eye. However, horseshoe crabs have multiple eyes, including two large compound eyes and many small ones. These eyes help them detect light and movement and are important for navigation and finding mates during spawning season.

Former scientific names include Limulus cyclops, Xiphosura americana, and Polyphemus occidentalis.

Studies of microsatellite DNA have revealed several discrete geographic populations in the Atlantic horseshoe crab. While there is extensive mixing between neighbouring populations, primarily due to movements by males, there is little or no mixing between the US and isolated Yucatán Peninsula horseshoe crabs, leading some to suggest that a taxonomic review is necessary.

== Anatomy and physiology ==
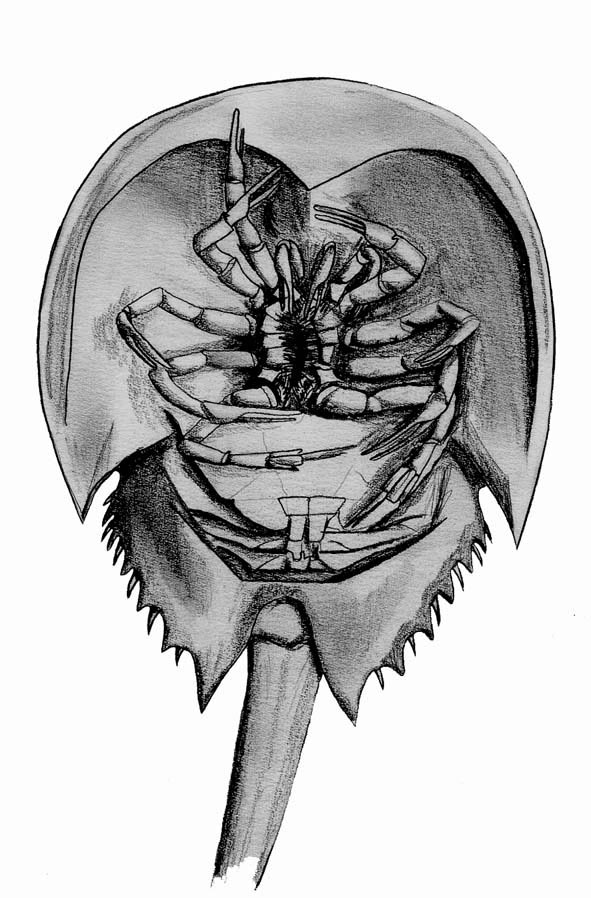
Underside view: The mouth opening is between the legs, and the gills are visible below.

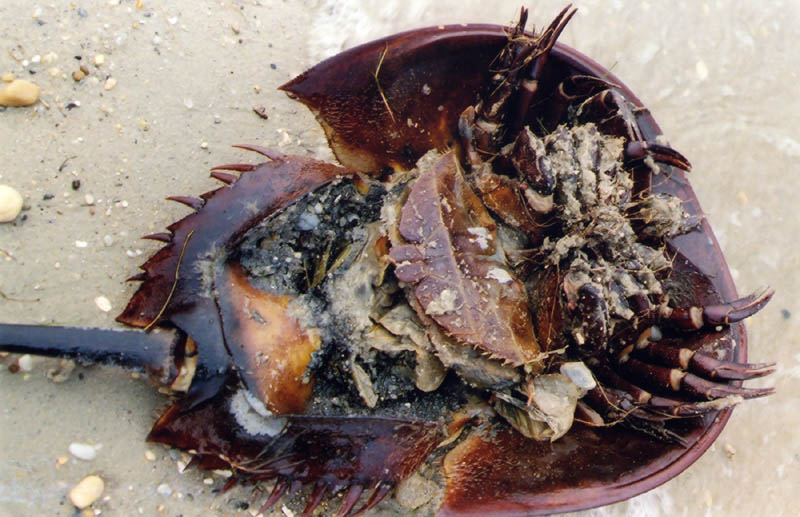
Underside of a female showing the legs and book gills.

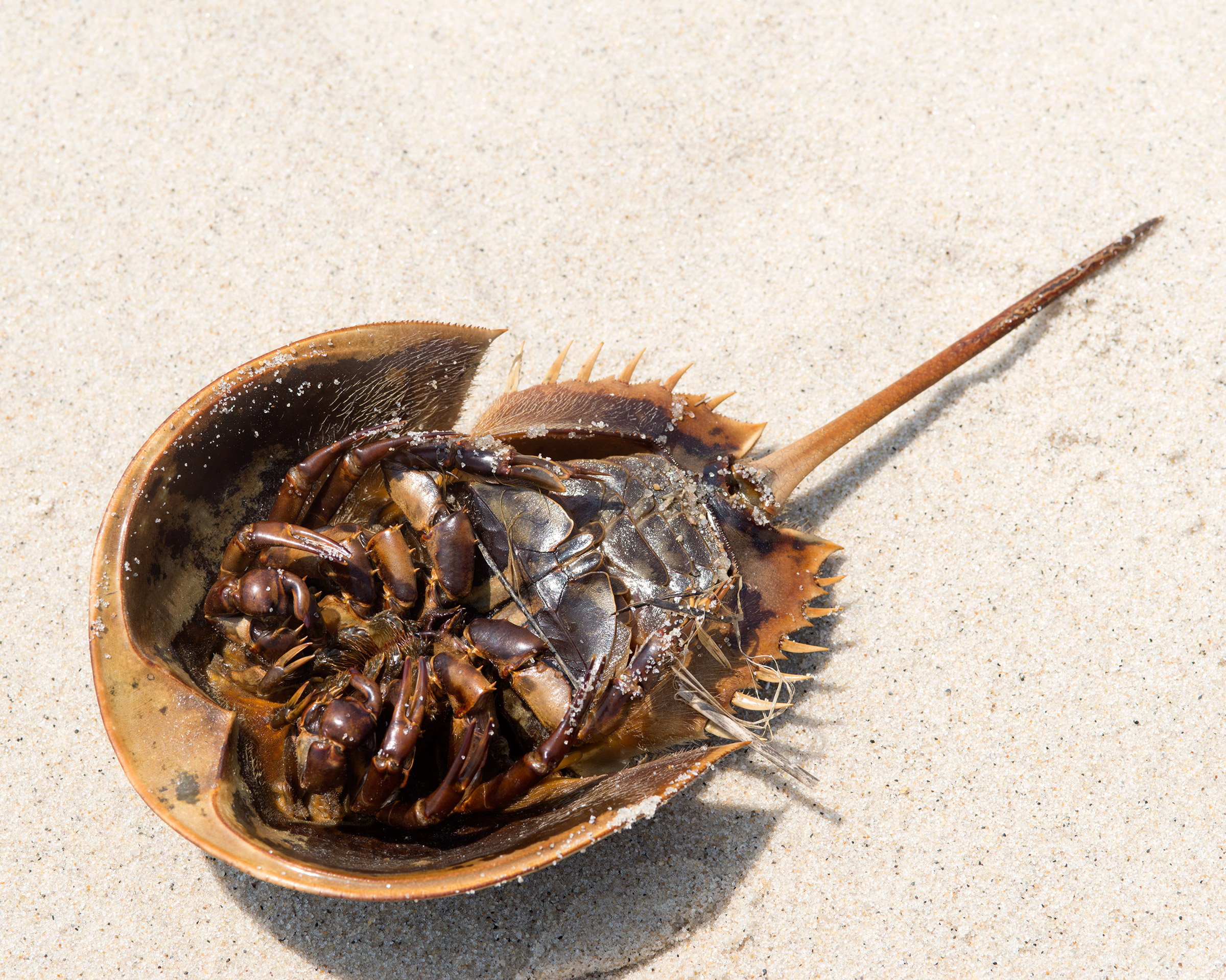
Underside of a male, showing the first leg modified for grasping the female during copulation.

Horseshoe crabs have three main parts to the body: the head region, known as the "prosoma", the abdominal region or "opisthosoma", and the spine-like tail or "telson". The smooth shell or carapace is shaped like a horseshoe, and is greenish grey to dark brown in colour. The sexes are similar in appearance, but females are typically 25 to 30% larger than the male in length and width, and can reach more than twice the weight. Females can grow up to 60 cm (24 in) in length, including tail, and 4.8 kg (11 lb) in weight. There are also geographic differences: in the United States, there is a north–south cline in the size. Central animals, between Georgia and Cape Cod, are the largest. North of Cape Cod and south of Georgia they gradually become smaller. In Delaware Bay, females and males have an average carapace width of about 25.5 cm (10.0 in) and 20 cm (7.9 in), respectively. In Florida, females average about 21.5 cm (8.5 in) and males 16 cm (6.3 in). However, this north-south pattern does not exist in the Yucatán Peninsula, the southernmost population of the species, where some subpopulations are intermediate between the Delaware Bay and Florida horseshoe crabs, and others are smaller, averaging about 3/4 the size of Florida horseshoe crabs.

Horseshoe crabs are not known to regrow entire limbs, but have been documented with small terminal pincer segments that appear to be regenerated terminal pincer segments on the walking feet.

A wide range of marine species become attached to the carapace, including algae, flat worms, mollusks, barnacles, and bryozoans, and horseshoe crabs have been described as 'walking museums' due to the number of organisms they can support. In areas where Limulus is common, the shells, exoskeletons or exuviae (molted shells) of horseshoe crabs frequently wash up on beaches, either as whole shells, or as disarticulated pieces.

The brain and the heart are located in the prosoma. On the underside of the prosoma, six pairs of appendages occur, the first of which (the small pincers or chelicerae) are used to pass food into the mouth, which is located in the middle of the underside of the cephalothorax, between the chelicerae. Although most arthropods have mandibles, the horseshoe crab is jawless, instead relying on the chelicerae to perform similar functions. The remaining ten additional limbs are used for locomotion on the sea floor. Males of the species develop clasping hooks in the first pair of these limbs, the pedipalps, in order to hold on to the female during mating. The posterior pair of limbs end in structures used for burrowing into the sediment.

The telson (i.e., tail) is used by the horseshoe crab to steer during locomotion and to maintain stability while moving along the seafloor. The telson may also be used by L. polyphemus to right itself if flipped upside down. Horseshoe crabs are often flipped over by currents, and in this position they are vulnerable to suffocation.

Among other senses, they have a small chemoreceptor organ that senses smells on the triangular area formed by the exoskeleton beneath the body near the ventral eyes.

=== Vision ===
Limulus has been extensively used in research into the physiology of vision. The Nobel Prize in Medicine was awarded in 1967 in part for research performed on the horseshoe crab eye.

A large compound eye with monochromatic vision is found on each side of the prosoma; (Note: Peak absorption is at 525 nm) it has five simple eyes on the carapace, and two simple eyes on the underside, just in front of the mouth, making a total of nine eyes. The simple eyes are probably important during the embryonic or larval stages of the organism, and even unhatched embryos seem to be able to sense light levels from within their buried eggs. The less sensitive compound eyes, and the median ocelli, become the dominant sight organs during adulthood.

In addition, the tail bears a series of light-sensing organs along its length.

Each compound eye is composed of about 1000 receptors called ommatidia, complex structures consisting of upwards of 300 cells. The ommatidia are somewhat messily arranged, not falling into the ordered hexagonal pattern seen in more derived arthropods. Each ommatidium feeds into a single nerve fiber. Furthermore, the nerves are large and relatively accessible. This made it possible for electrophysiologists to record the nervous response to light stimulation easily, and to observe visual phenomena such as lateral inhibition working at the cellular level. More recently, behavioral experiments have investigated the functions of visual perception in Limulus. Habituation and classical conditioning to light stimuli have been demonstrated, as has the use of brightness and shape information by males when recognizing potential mates.

The retinula (literally, "small retina") cells of the ommatidium of the compound eye contain areas from which membranous organelles of conceivable size (rhabdomeres) extend. Rhabdomeres have tiny microvilli (tiny tubes extending out of the retinula) that interlock with neighboring retinular cells. This forms the rhabdom, which contains the dendrite of the eccentric cell, and may also contribute some microvilli. The only other species with an eccentric cell is the silkworm moth. Microvilli are composed of a double layer, 7 nm each and with 3.5 nm space of two electron-deficient boundaries in between. Where the microvilli meet, these outer borders fuse and yield five membranes about 15 nm thick. In all arthropods, there is always a rhabdom below a crystalline cone, on or near the center of the ommatidium, and always aligned with the path of light. At right angles to the length of the rhabdome are the length of the microvilli, which are in line with each other. The microvilli are about 40–150 nm in diameter.

=== Blood ===
The blood of horseshoe crabs (as well as that of most mollusks, including cephalopods and gastropods) contains the copper-containing protein hemocyanin at concentrations of about 50 g per liter. These creatures do not have hemoglobin (iron-containing protein), which is the basis of oxygen transport in vertebrates. Hemocyanin is colorless when deoxygenated and dark blue when oxygenated. As they generally live in cold environments with low oxygen tensions, their blood is grey-white to pale yellow, and it turns dark blue when exposed to the oxygen in the air, as seen when they bleed. Hemocyanin carries oxygen in extracellular fluid, which is in contrast to the intracellular oxygen transport in vertebrates by hemoglobin in red blood cells.

The blood of horseshoe crabs contains one type of blood cell, the amebocytes. These play an important role in the defense against pathogens. Amebocytes contain granules with a clotting factor known as coagulogen; this is released outside the cell when bacterial endotoxin is encountered. The resulting coagulation is thought to contain bacterial infections in the animal's semiclosed circulatory system.

== Distribution and habitat ==
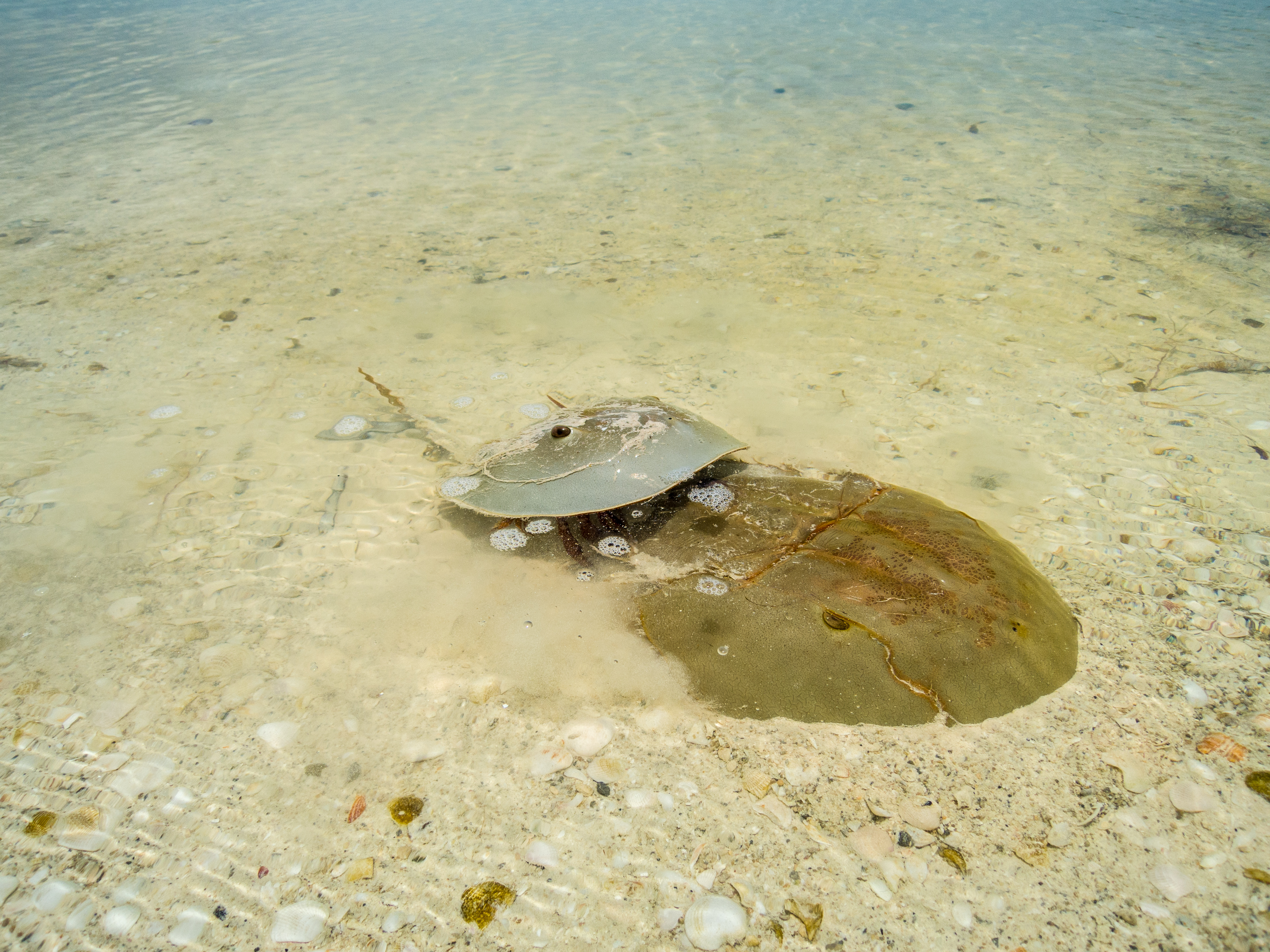
Atlantic horseshoe crabs in Mexico, such as this pair at Holbox Island, mostly breed in lagoons with mangrove and seagrass

The Atlantic horseshoe crab is the only extant (living) species of horseshoe crab native to the Americas, although there are other extinct species only known from fossil remains from this region. The other living species of horseshoe crab are restricted to Asia, but all are quite similar in form and behavior. The Asian species are Tachypleus tridentatus, Tachypleus gigas and Carcinoscorpius rotundicauda.

Most Atlantic horseshoe crabs are found along the Atlantic East Coast of the United States, ranging from Maine to Florida. In the Gulf Coast of the United States, they are found in Florida, Alabama, Mississippi and Louisiana. Outside the United States, the only breeding population is in Mexico's Yucatán Peninsula, where it is found on the western, northern and eastern coasts. Individuals rarely appear outside the breeding range, with a few records from the Atlantic coast of Canada (Lahave Island on Nova Scotia), the Bahamas, the Turks and Caicos, Cuba and the western Gulf of Mexico (Texas and Veracruz). Historic claims of horseshoe crabs on Jamaica and Hispaniola (on the Dominican Republic's southeast coast) have not resulted in any discoveries after expeditions there. There have been attempts of introducing it to Texas, California and the southern North Sea, but these all failed to become established. Records from Europe, Israel and Western Africa are considered releases/escapees of captives.

Atlantic horseshoe crabs range from shallow coastal habitats such as lagoons, estuaries and mangrove to depths of more than 200 m (660 ft) up to 56 km (35 mi) offshore. There are indications that they prefer depths shallower than 30 m (98 ft). The temperature preference varies depending on the population, with the northernmost being the most cold-resistant: in the Great Bay in New Hampshire they show increased activity above 10.5 °C (51 °F) and in Delaware Bay they are active above 15 °C (59 °F). In contrast, these northern populations do not tolerate as warm temperatures as southern populations of the species. Atlantic horseshoe crabs can be seen in waters that range from brackish (almost fresh water) to hypersaline (almost twice the salinity of sea water), but their optimum growth is at salinities around or slightly below sea water (20–40‰).

A 2022 study of ancient (Early Pleistocene, 2 million years ago) environmental DNA from the Kap Kobenhavn Formation of northern Greenland identified preserved DNA fragments of horseshoe crabs, assigned to L. polyphemus. This suggests that horseshoe crabs ranged and spawned as far north as Greenland during these warmer conditions. Around this time, the sea surface temperature would have been 8 °C warmer than the present. These are among the oldest DNA fragments ever sequenced.

== Life cycle and behavior ==
External videos
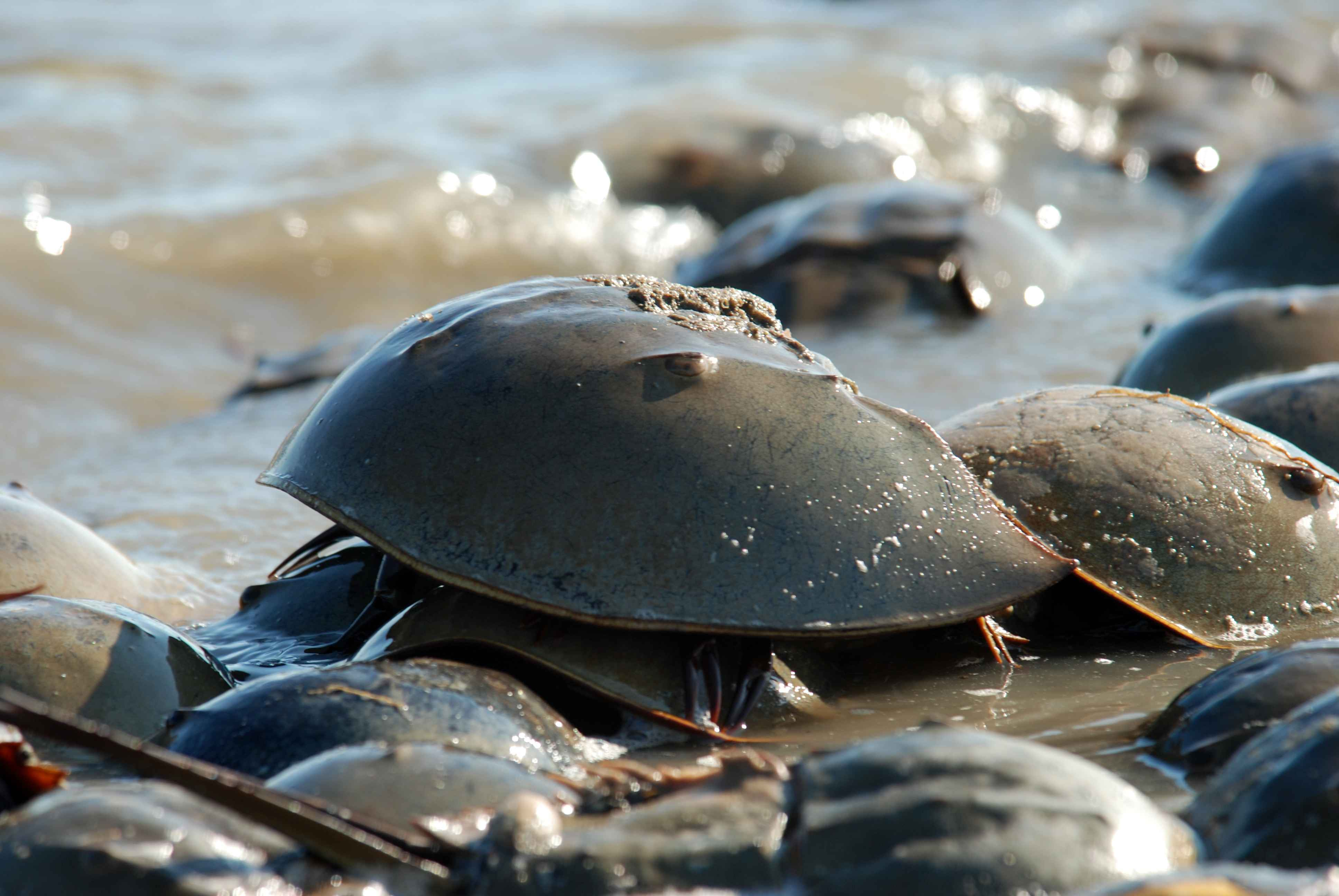
- Rendezvous with a Horseshoe Crab, August 2011, 4:34, NewsWorks
- The Horseshoe Crab Spawn, June 2010, 5:08, HostOurCoast.com
- Horseshoe Crabs Mate in Massive Beach "Orgy", June 2014, 3:29, National Geographic

Horseshoe crabs feed on mollusks, annelid worms, other benthic invertebrates, and bits of fish. Lacking jaws, they grind food with bristles on their legs and a gizzard that contains sand and gravel.

Spawning tends to occur in the intertidal zone and to be correlated with spring tides (the highest tides of the month). The breeding season varies. Northern populations (all in the United States, except those in southern Florida) generally breed from the spring to the autumn, while southern populations (southern Florida and Yucatán Peninsula) breed year-round. In the north, breeding is triggered by a temperature increase, but this is reversed in the Yucatán Peninsula, the southernmost population, where decreasing temperatures stimulate breeding. In Massachusetts, horseshoe crabs spend the winters on the continental shelf and emerge at the shoreline in late spring to spawn, with the males arriving first. The smaller male grabs on to the back of a female with a "boxing glove" like structure on his front claws, often holding on for months at a time. Often several males will hold on to a single female. Females reach the beach at high tide. After the female has laid a batch of eggs in a nest at a depth of 15–20 cm (6–8 in) in the sand, the male or males fertilize them with their sperm. Egg quantity is dependent on the female's body size, and ranges from 15,000 to 64,000 eggs per female.

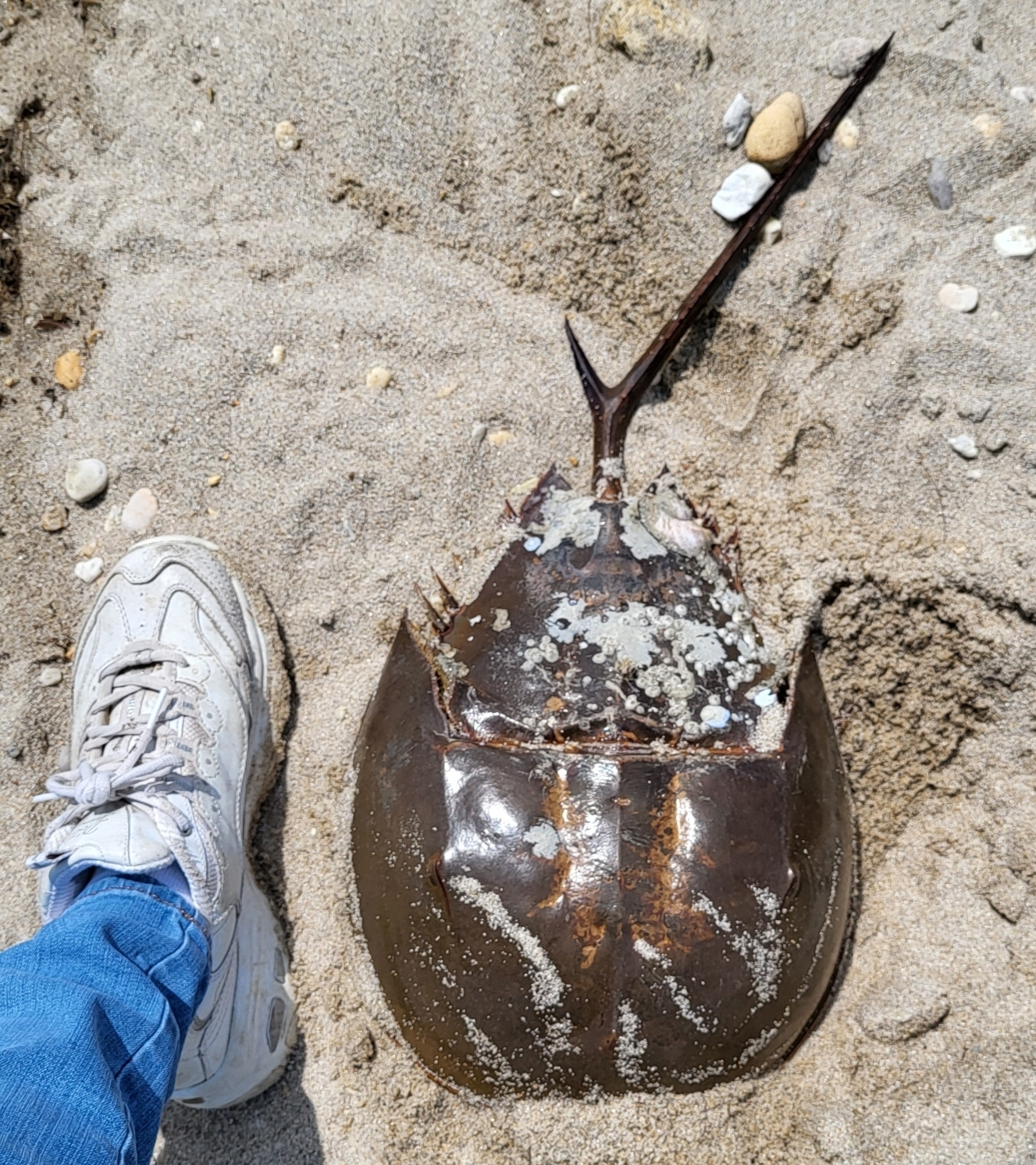
Size comparison. This female has an unusual forked telson.

Development begins when the first egg cover splits and new membrane, secreted by the embryo, forms a transparent spherical capsule. The larvae form and then swim for about five to seven days. After swimming, they settle, and begin the first molt. This occurs about 20 days after the formation of the egg capsule. As young horseshoe crabs grow, they move to deeper waters, where molting continues. Before becoming sexually mature around age 9, they have to shed their shells some 17 times. In the first 2–3 years of their life, the juveniles stay in shallow coastal waters near the breeding beaches. Longevity is difficult to assess, but the average lifespan is thought to be 20–40 years.

Research from the University of New Hampshire gives insight into the circadian rhythm of Atlantic horseshoe crabs. For example, several studies have looked into the effect of a circa tidal rhythm on the locomotion of this species. While it has been known for a while that a circadian clock system controls eye sensitivity, scientists discovered a separate clock system for locomotion. When a sample of Atlantic horseshoe crabs were exposed to artificial tidal cycles in the lab, circa tidal rhythms were observed. The study found that light and dark cycles influence locomotion, but not as much as tidal activity.

== Epibionts ==
Atlantic horseshoe crabs are often hosts for a plethora of epibionts that live across its body, especially since they stop molting once they reach sexual maturity. Polychaetae worms, barnacles, bryozoans, bivalves, hydrozoans and gastropods, particularly slipper snails, often cover the horseshoe crab's carapace. This can cause problems for the horseshoe crab if the animals cover its eyes, reducing much of its vision. Flatworms, such as the Limulus leech, live in the book gills and around the legs of the horseshoe crab. To reduce the number of epibionts that live on its carapace, Atlantic horseshoe crabs secrete a viscous anti-fouling dermal exudate. This secretion makes the surface of the shell less desirable for animals to colonize.

== Evolution ==
Despite the limited fossil record, many ancient specimens closely resemble modern horseshoe crabs, indicating that their overall body structure has remained largely unchanged over time. This pattern of minimal structural change over long periods is often described as evolutionary stability. Horseshoe crabs were traditionally grouped with the extinct eurypterids (sea scorpions) as the Merostomata. However, recent studies suggest a relationship between the eurypterids and the arachnids, leaving Xiphosura in the clade Prosomapoda. They may have evolved in the shallow seas of the Paleozoic Era (541–252 million years ago) with other primitive arthropods like the trilobites. The four species of horseshoe crab are the only remaining members of the Xiphosura, one of the oldest classes of marine arthropods.

The oldest known horseshoe crab, Lunataspis aurora, 4 centimetres (1.6 in) from head to tail-tip, has been identified in 445-million-year-old Ordovician strata in Manitoba.. This fossil shows that early horseshoe crabs have a similar body structure to modern species. Its features suggest that the horseshoe crab body was established very early in their history. Discoveries like this help scientists understand how certain traits remained stable over a long period of time.

Horseshoe crabs are often referred to as living fossils, as they have changed little in the last 445 million years. Forms almost identical to this species were present during the Triassic period 230 million years ago, and similar species were present in the Devonian, 400 million years ago. However, horseshoe crab preservation in the fossil record is extremely rare and the Atlantic horseshoe crab itself has no fossil record at all. Until recently it was thought that the genus Limulus "ranges back only some 20 million years, not 200 million".

The oldest member of the subfamily Limulinae are known from the Late Jurassic (Tithonian), belonging to the species Crenatolimulus darwini from Poland. The oldest and currently only other known species in the genus Limulus is Limulus coffini from the Late Cretaceous (Maastrichtian) of the United States.

== Medical uses ==
Horseshoe crabs are valuable as a species to the medical research community, and in medical testing. An extract of blood cells (amoebocytes) from Limulus polyphemus is a critical component in the widely used Limulus amebocyte lysate (LAL) test to detect and quantify bacterial endotoxins in pharmaceuticals and to test for several bacterial diseases. A protein from horseshoe crab blood is also under investigation as a novel antibiotic.

Procuring the raw materials for LAL testing involves collecting and bleeding horseshoe crabs from wild populations. Horseshoe crabs are returned to the ocean after bleeding, however, there is a level of mortality and sub-lethal impact involved. It is estimated that between 10 and 30 percent of horseshoe crabs die after bleeding. Released horseshoe crabs may also be more prone to disease and be less successful in reproducing.

Studies show the blood volume returns to normal in about a week, though blood cell count can take two to three months to fully rebound. Animals that survive the process may be more lethargic when released and less likely to mate – which has prompted concerns about the longer-term impacts of harvesting horseshoe crabs.

The LAL test is a major source of animal product dependence in the biomedical industry, and a challenge to the Three Rs of science in relation to the use of animals in testing. There are efforts to reduce the dependence on horseshoe crabs, refine the process of collecting blood from the animals (including through aquaculture), and even replace the use of animal-derived assays utilizing synthetic approaches, such as the recombinant factor C (rFC) assay.

== Conservation and management ==
Overall the Atlantic horseshoe crab is recognized as vulnerable by the IUCN due primarily to overharvesting and habitat loss. There are, however, significant geographic differences with some populations increasing, some stable and some declining.

Some conservation efforts for horseshoe crabs include harvest regulations, protected spawning areas, and monitoring programs to help maintain a stable population and reduce long-term decline.

=== United States ===
Horseshoe crab harvest, Delaware, circa 1926. Millions of crabs were harvested for fertilizer around Delaware Bay. Some were fed to hogs.

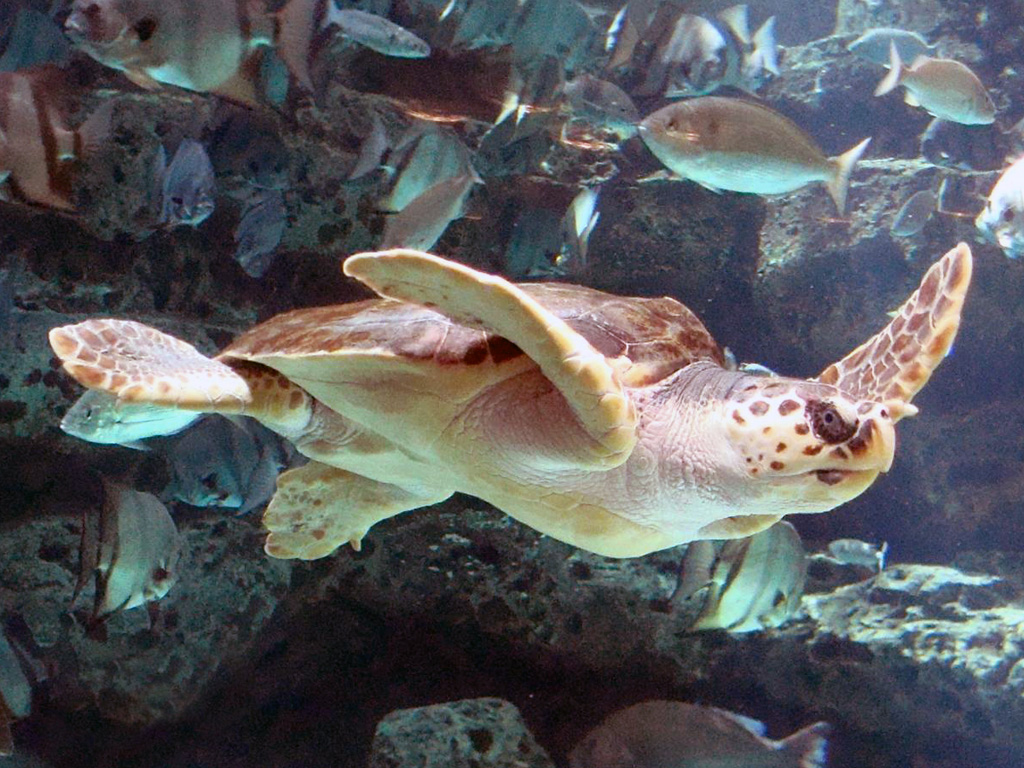
The loggerhead sea turtle has suffered from the reduction in numbers of Atlantic horseshoe crabs

Early in the 20th century and possibly before, there was the mistaken belief in some areas that horseshoe crabs were destructive to fisheries, folklore held that they used their long spines to drill into some shellfish. Because of this mistaken belief and folklore, bounties were sometimes offered by authorities for them. On Cape Cod in the early 20th century five cents was offered for every dead horseshoe crab turned in.

The Atlantic horseshoe crab is not presently endangered, but harvesting and habitat destruction have reduced its numbers at some locations and caused some concern for this animal's future. Since the 1970s, the horseshoe crab population has been decreasing in some areas, due to several factors, including the use of the crab as bait in eel, whelk and conch trapping. According to the Horseshoe Crab Benchmark Stock Assessment Peer Review Report published by the Atlantic States Marine Fisheries Commission (ASMFC), the population continues to remain stable where biomedical is present in the Northeast and thrive and grow in the Southeast due to protection efforts – a trend spanning decades.

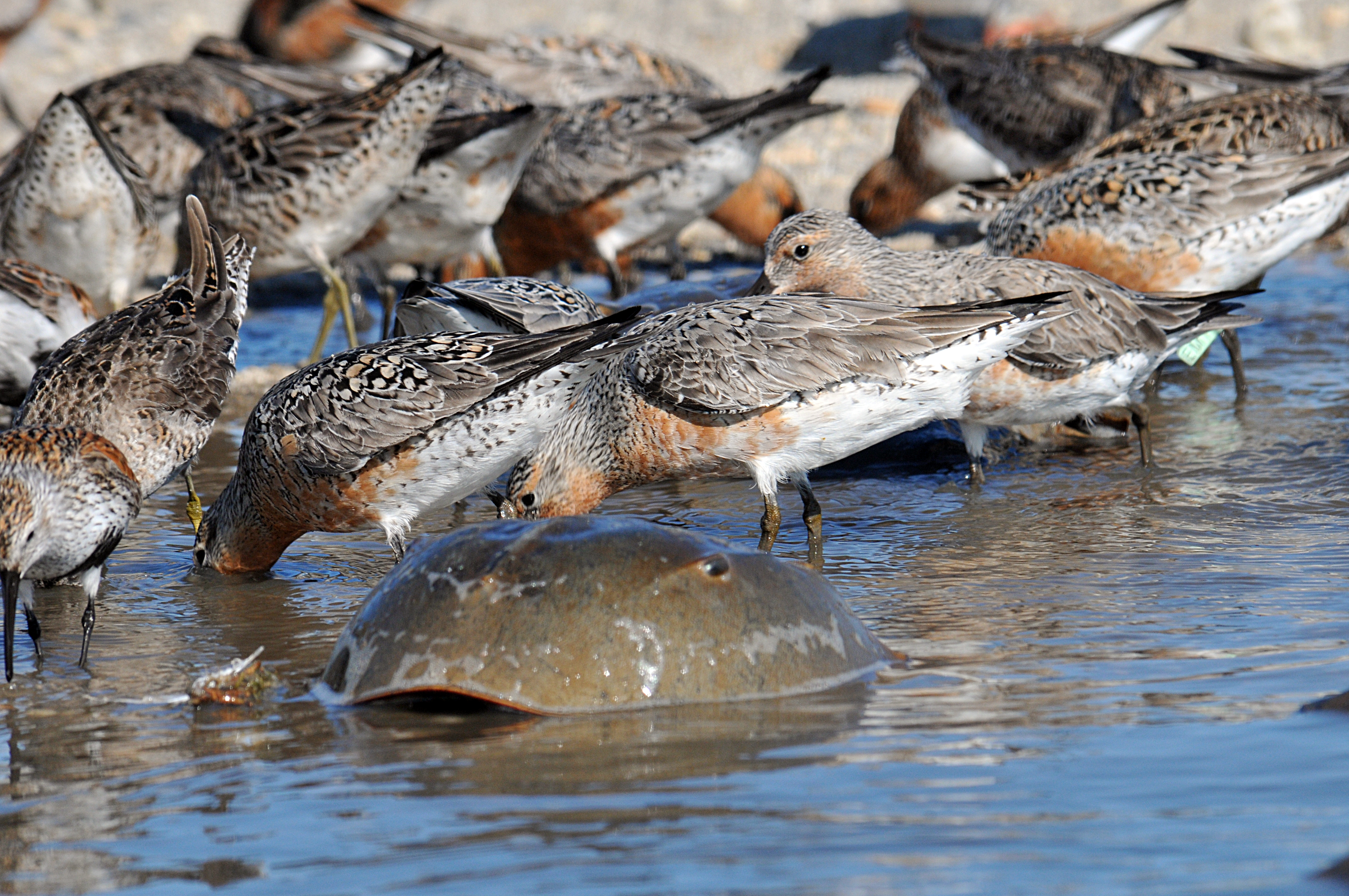
Red knots feeding on horseshoe crab eggs in Delaware

Conservationists have also voiced concerns about the declining population of shorebirds, such as red knots, which rely heavily on the horseshoe crabs' eggs for food during their spring migration. Precipitous declines in the population of the red knots have been observed in recent years. Predators of horseshoe crabs, such as the currently threatened Atlantic loggerhead turtle, have also suffered as crab populations diminish.

In 1991, the species was provided legislated protection from bait fishing in South Carolina by calling on the management and regulation of the horseshoe crab fisheries, allowing only hand-collecting for biomedical applications and marine biological research. Without the need for LAL in biomedical use, the legal protection of the horseshoe crab is not guaranteed in the future, and they would again fall prey to overfishing and use as bait. In 1995, the nonprofit Ecological Research and Development Group (ERDG) was founded with the aim of preserving the four remaining species of horseshoe crab. Since its inception, the ERDG has made significant contributions to horseshoe crab conservation. ERDG founder Glenn Gauvry designed a mesh bag for whelk/conch traps, to prevent other species from removing the bait. This has led to a decrease in the amount of bait needed by approximately 50%. In the state of Virginia, these mesh bags are mandatory in whelk/conch fishery. The Atlantic States Marine Fisheries Commission in 2006 considered several conservation options, among them being a two-year ban on harvesting the animals, affecting both Delaware and New Jersey shores of Delaware Bay. In June 2007, Delaware Superior Court Judge Richard Stokes has allowed limited harvesting of 100,000 males. He ruled that while the crab population was seriously depleted by overharvesting through 1998, it has since stabilized, and that this limited take of males will not adversely affect either horseshoe crab or red knot populations. In opposition, Delaware environmental secretary John Hughes concluded that a decline in the red knot bird population was so significant that extreme measures were needed to ensure a supply of crab eggs when the birds arrived. Harvesting of the crabs was banned in New Jersey on March 25, 2008.

Every year, about 10% of the horseshoe crab breeding population dies when rough surf flips them onto their backs, a position from which they often cannot right themselves. In response, the ERDG launched a "Just Flip 'Em" campaign, encouraging beachgoers to turn the crabs back over. New Jersey beaches campaign "ReTURN the Favor", trains volunteers to rescue impinged and overturned horseshoe crabs while collecting data on natural and man-made hazards.

A large-scale project to tag and count horseshoe crabs along the North American coast was started in 2008, termed Project Limulus. Due to the lack of information and knowledge regarding horseshoe crab populations, the management policies lack any abundance of rules and regulations. To implement management policies for the species, more population information needs to be obtained.

=== Mexico ===
Since 1994, the populations in the Yucatán Peninsula have been recognized as endangered under Mexican law. They have declined since the 1960s and remaining significant Yucatán populations are mostly within protected areas.

== Bibliography ==
- Richard Owen (1873). Anatomy of the king crab (Limulus polyphemus, Latr.). London: Taylor and Francis.
