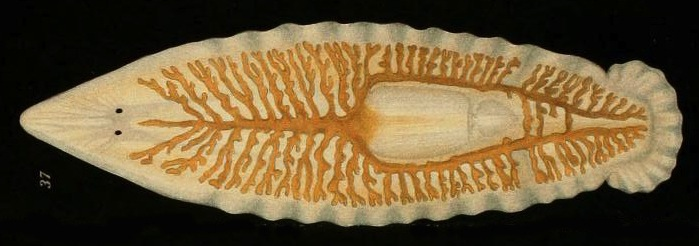

Scientific classification
- Kingdom: Animalia
- Phylum: Platyhelminthes
- Order: Tricladida
- Family: Bdellouridae
- Genus: Bdelloura
- Species: B. candida

Binomial name
- Bdelloura candida Girard, 1850

Synonyms
- Bdelloura parasitica (Leidy, 1851); Planaria limuli (Graff, 1879); Vortex candida (Girard, 1850)

= Bdelloura candida =

Species of marine flatworm

Bdelloura candida, sometimes called the Limulus leech, is a species of planarian flatworm in the family Bdellouridae. The flatworm has a commensalistic relationship with the Atlantic horseshoe crab, Limulus polyphemus, living in the horseshoe crab's book gills and around joints and legs. The common name Limulus leech is a misnomer, as the species is a flatworm and not a leech, and it is not parasitic, as leeches are.

== Description ==
B. candida is a small white or yellowish flatworm that can grow up to 25 mm long and 5 mm wide. It has a general lanceolate or oval shape that is widest at the middle of its body. The anterior end has a round adhesive disk that is slightly separated from the rest of the body by an indentation. The flatworm's only sucker is almost the width of its body when not contracted. The sides of its body are undulated. The pharynx is large, taking up about one third of the body length. The brown intestines that may be seen through the body have one frontal segment and two rear branches that do not rejoin. The mouth is on the ventral side of the body and allows for a white feeding tube to extend from it. The front end of the flatworm has two small, black eyes.

B. candida can be separated from another species of flatworm symbiotic to the Atlantic horseshoe crab, Syncoelidium pellucidum, through its larger size and well-developed caudal disk.

== Reproduction ==
In May to mid-August, B. candida lays elliptical or oval-shaped cocoons on the book gills of Atlantic horseshoe crabs. These cocoons are about 4 mm long and 2 mm wide. Once hatched, B. candida is a direct developer with no intermediate stages. Since the flatworm cannot survive without the host, they typically recolonize the same host. New colonization can occur either by the flatworm moving short distances off a molt or changing hosts during mating of the horseshoe crab.

== Distribution ==
B. candida can be found across the distribution of the Atlantic horseshoe crab across the eastern coast of North America. This range stretches from Canada to the Yucatan peninsula, including in the Gulf of Mexico.

== Ecology ==
B. candida is an ectosymbiote of the Atlantic horseshoe crab, Limulus polyphemus, that lives in the horseshoe crab's book gills and around the joints and legs. It was originally thought that the flatworm was a parasite that secreted a chitin-dissolving solvent produced from its pharynx to create holes in horseshoe crabs' gill lamellae. However, this hypothesis has not held as the interaction has never been observed. Instead, it has been observed that B. candida feeds on food waste from the horseshoe crab, such as fish. The flatworm relies on the horseshoe crab for access to food and will starve without the host.
