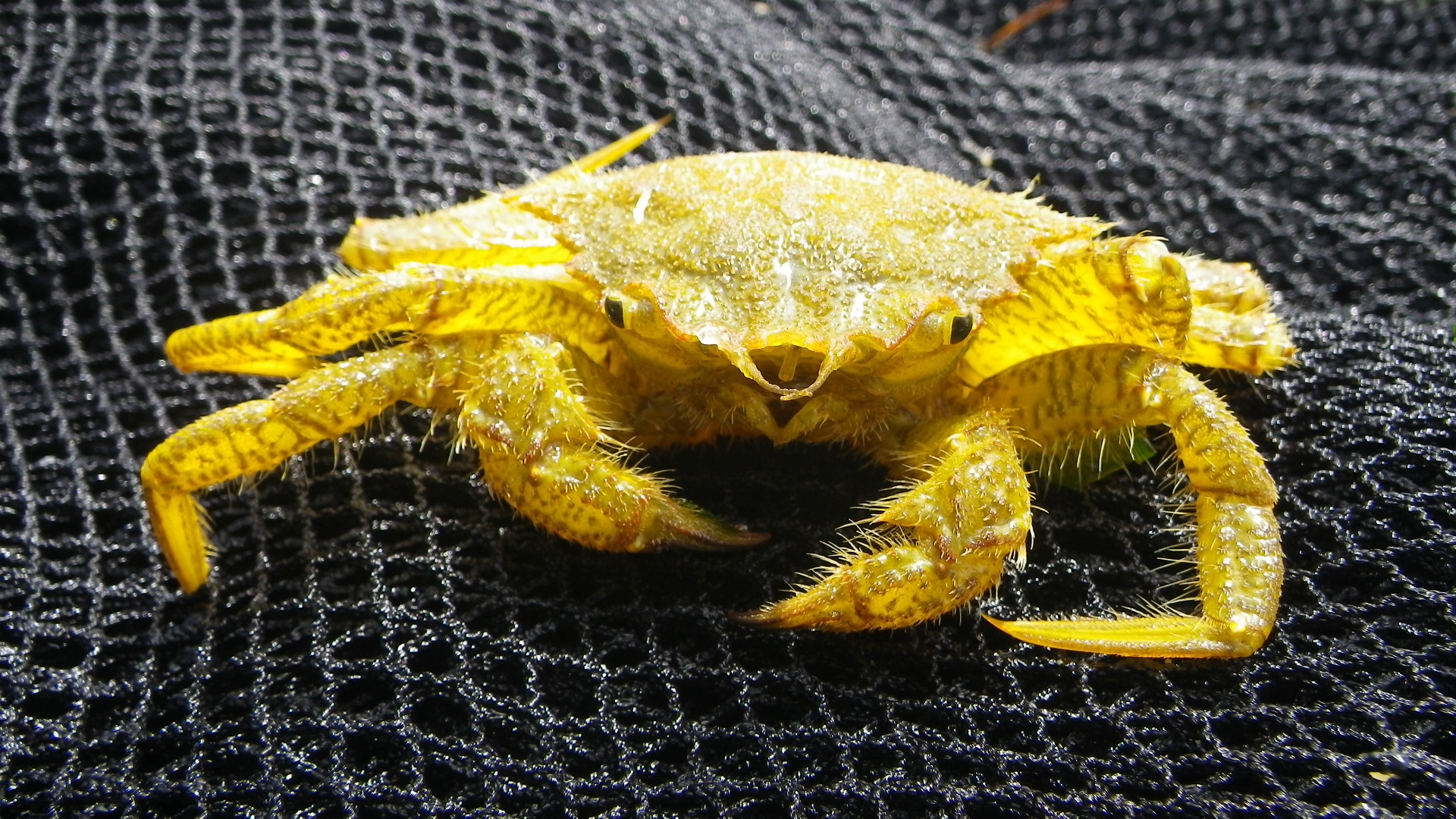
- Telmessus cheiragonus

Scientific classification
- Kingdom: Animalia
- Phylum: Arthropoda
- Class: Malacostraca
- Order: Decapoda
- Suborder: Pleocyemata
- Infraorder: Brachyura
- Family: Cheiragonidae
- Genus: Telmessus; White, 1846

= Telmessus (crab) =

Genus of crabs

Telmessus is a genus of crabs described by Scottish zoologist Adam White in 1846. Its type species is generally accepted as Telmessus cheiragonus.
