= Viking, Florida =

- Unincorporated community
- Location within Florida
- Coordinates: 27°32′30″N 80°21′43″W
- Country: United States
- State: Florida
- County: St. Lucie
- Elevation: 13 ft (4.0 m)
- Time zone: UTC-5 (Eastern (EST))
  - Summer (DST): UTC-4 (EDT)
- Area code: 772
- GNIS feature ID: 308163

Viking is an unincorporated community in St. Lucie County, Florida, United States. Viking is located along U.S. Route 1, 7 miles (11 km) north-northwest of Fort Pierce.

The town was founded by a Norwegian immigrants Jens (1858-1944) and Agathe Helseth and was so named for a large community of Scandinavians. At one time, there was a school and a post office in addition to the Helseth pineapple farm. The Helseth estate was donated to the State of Florida.
