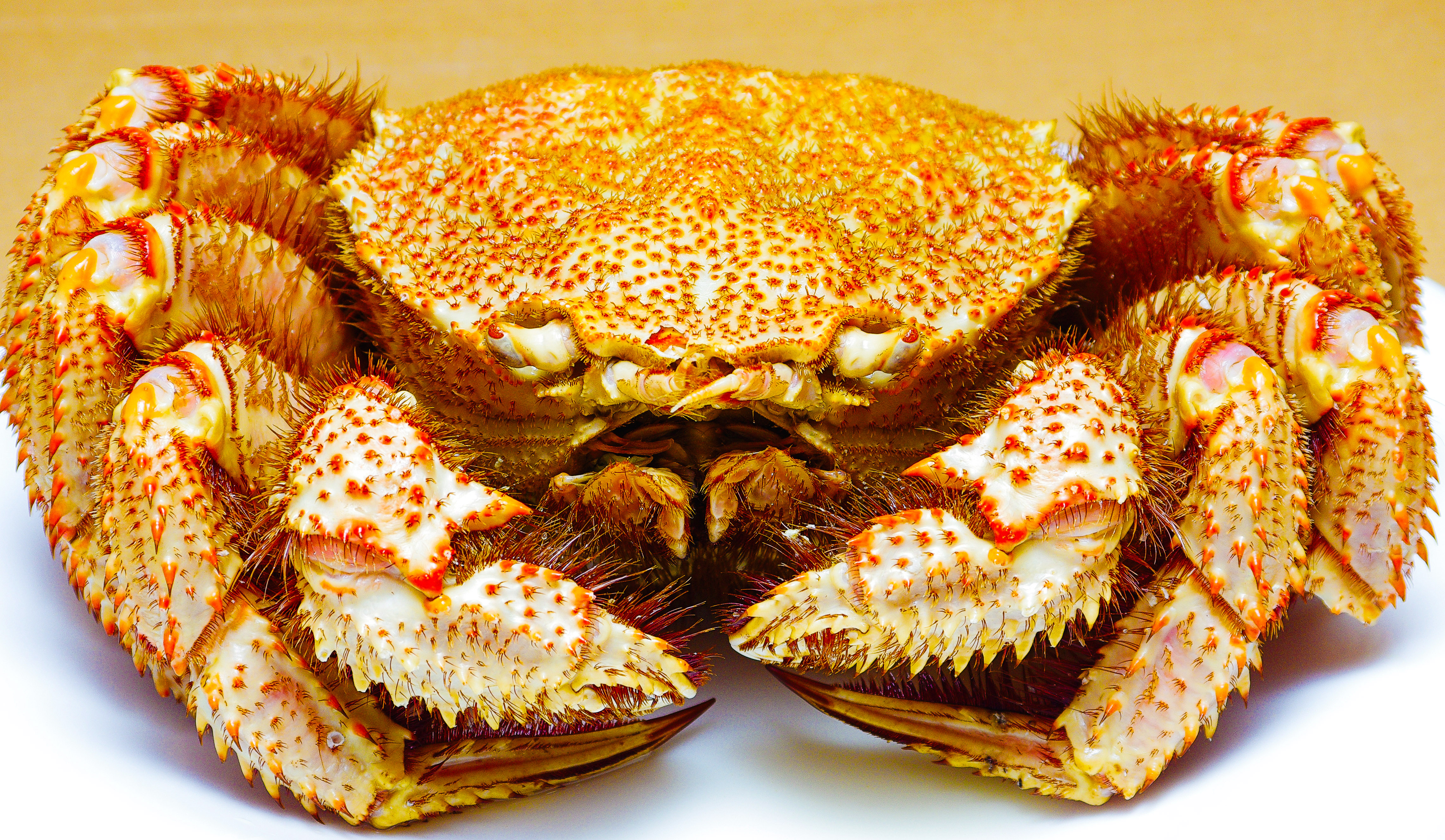

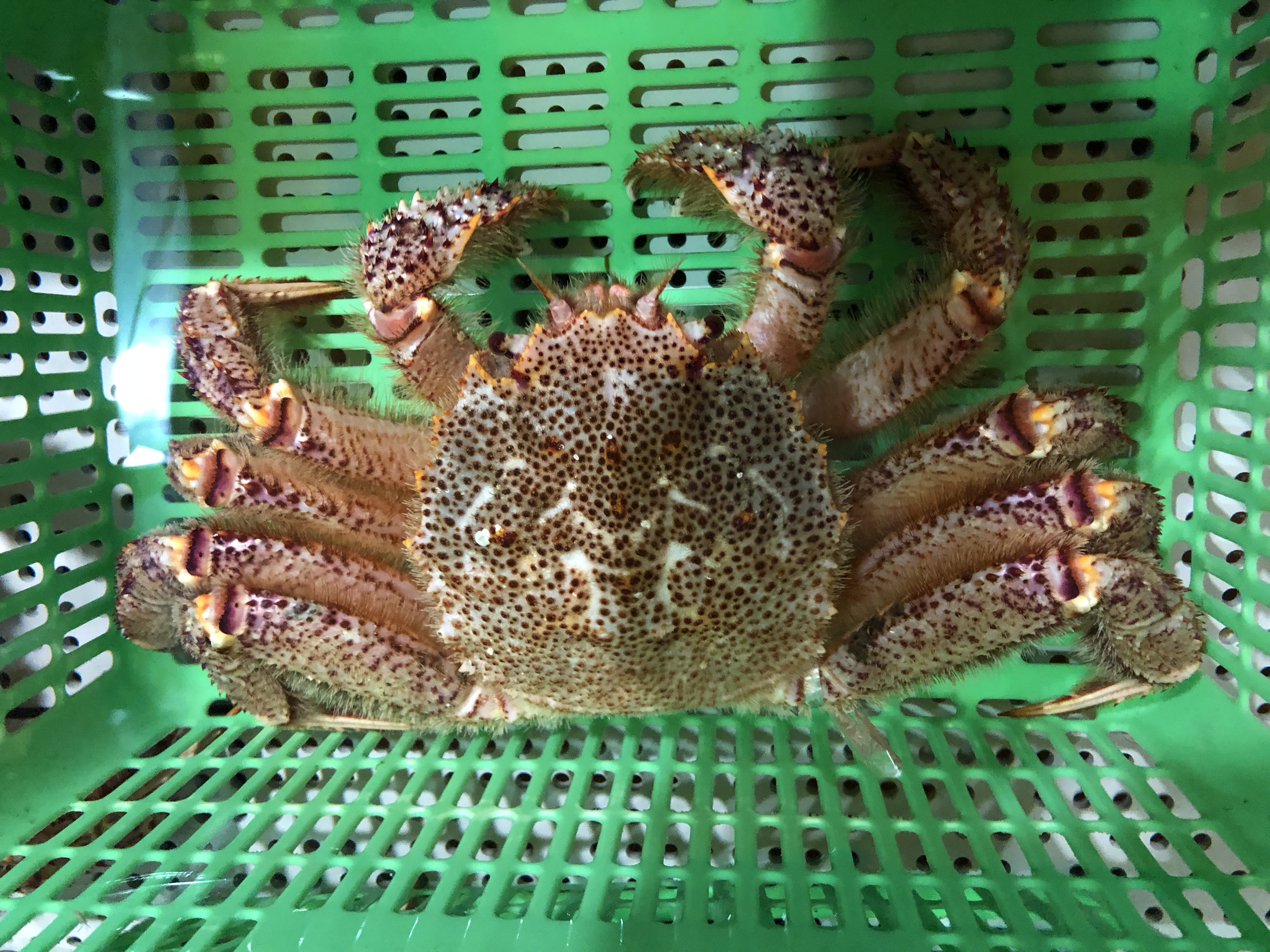

Scientific classification
- Kingdom: Animalia
- Phylum: Arthropoda
- Class: Malacostraca
- Order: Decapoda
- Suborder: Pleocyemata
- Infraorder: Brachyura
- Family: Cheiragonidae
- Genus: Erimacrus
- Species: E. isenbeckii

Binomial name
- Erimacrus isenbeckii (Brandt, 1848)

= Horsehair crab =

Species of crustacean

The horsehair crab (Erimacrus isenbeckii) is a species of crab which is found mainly in the Northwest Pacific, around the Hokkaido coast in the Sea of Okhotsk and the Western Bering Sea and is an important commercial species used in Japanese cuisine. It is also known by its Japanese name, kegani (ケガニ "hairy crab").

Despite the importance of the species, biological studies are usually specialized and limited. The catch for the species reached a peak in the 1950s at 27,000 tons and has decreased since, reaching 2,000 tons in 2003. Due to the commercial importance of the species, many stock enhancement programs have been utilized to help maintain a successful fishery. The species is commonly found on sandy benthic environments from shallow water to depths of up to 350 meters.

== Biology and description ==
E. isenbeckii has a hard shell and soft spines which cover the shell and appendages. It can reach over 1 kg in weight. Erimacrus isenbeckii is known to feed three to four times in a ten to twelve hour time-span and cannibalism is common for E. isenbeckii in the spring. The carapace of E. isenbeckii can reach 100 to 120 mm in length in adults. Like the two other species in the same family, the gonophores of females are exposed.

In the western Bering Sea, males typically live in areas of around 3.4 °C and depths of around 66 meters, while females can be found in temperatures of 2.4 °C and depths of around 64 meters.

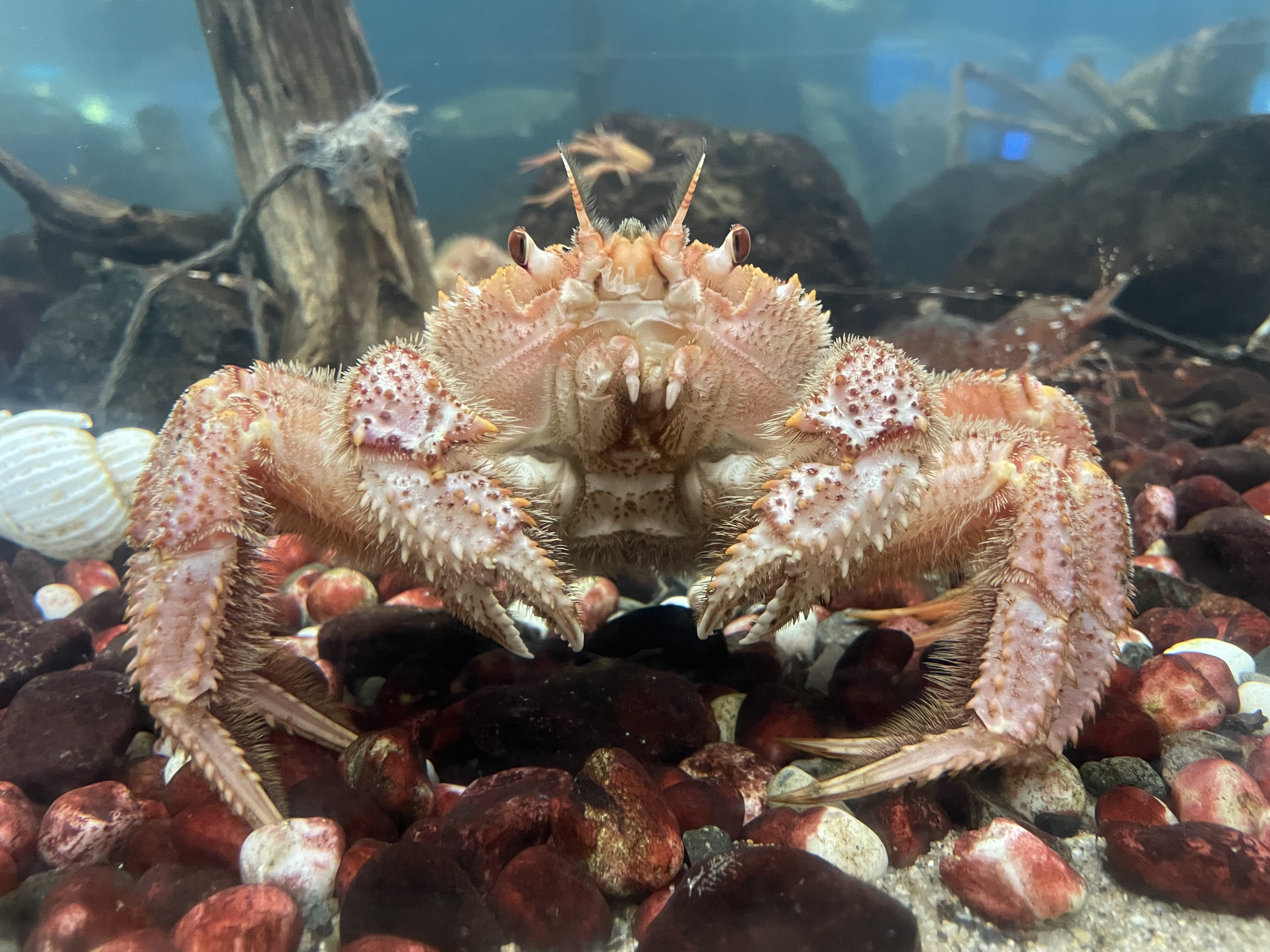

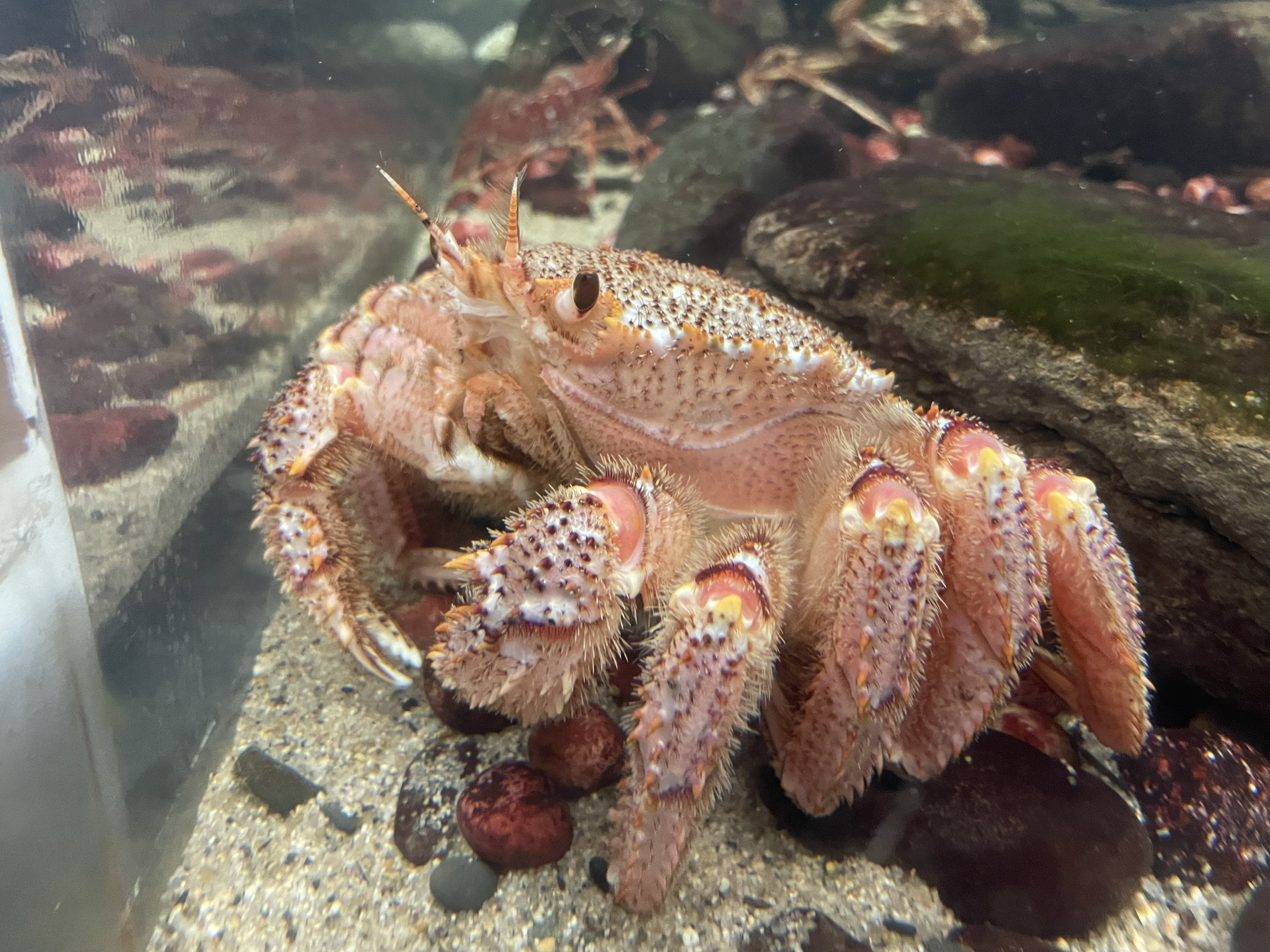

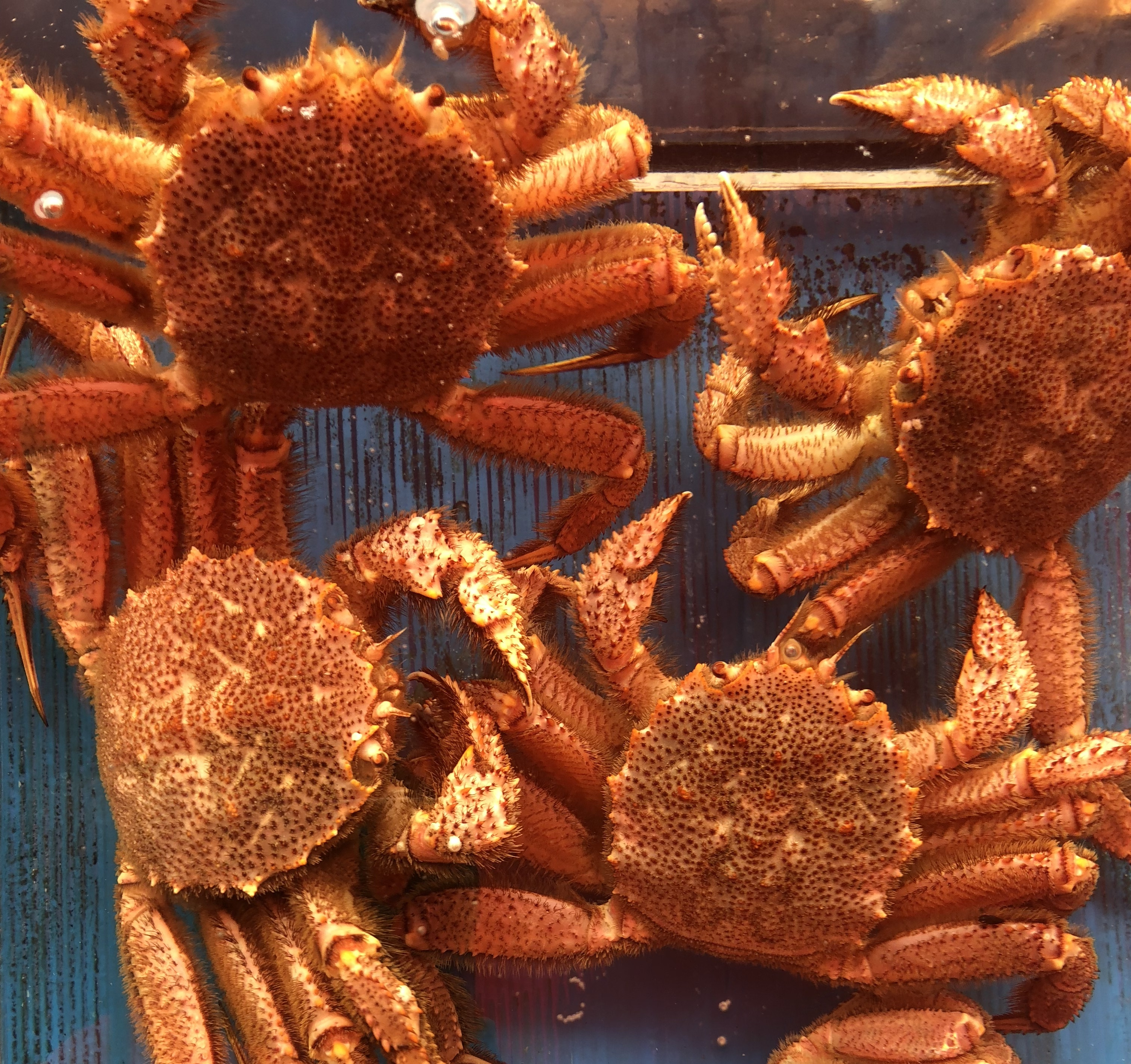

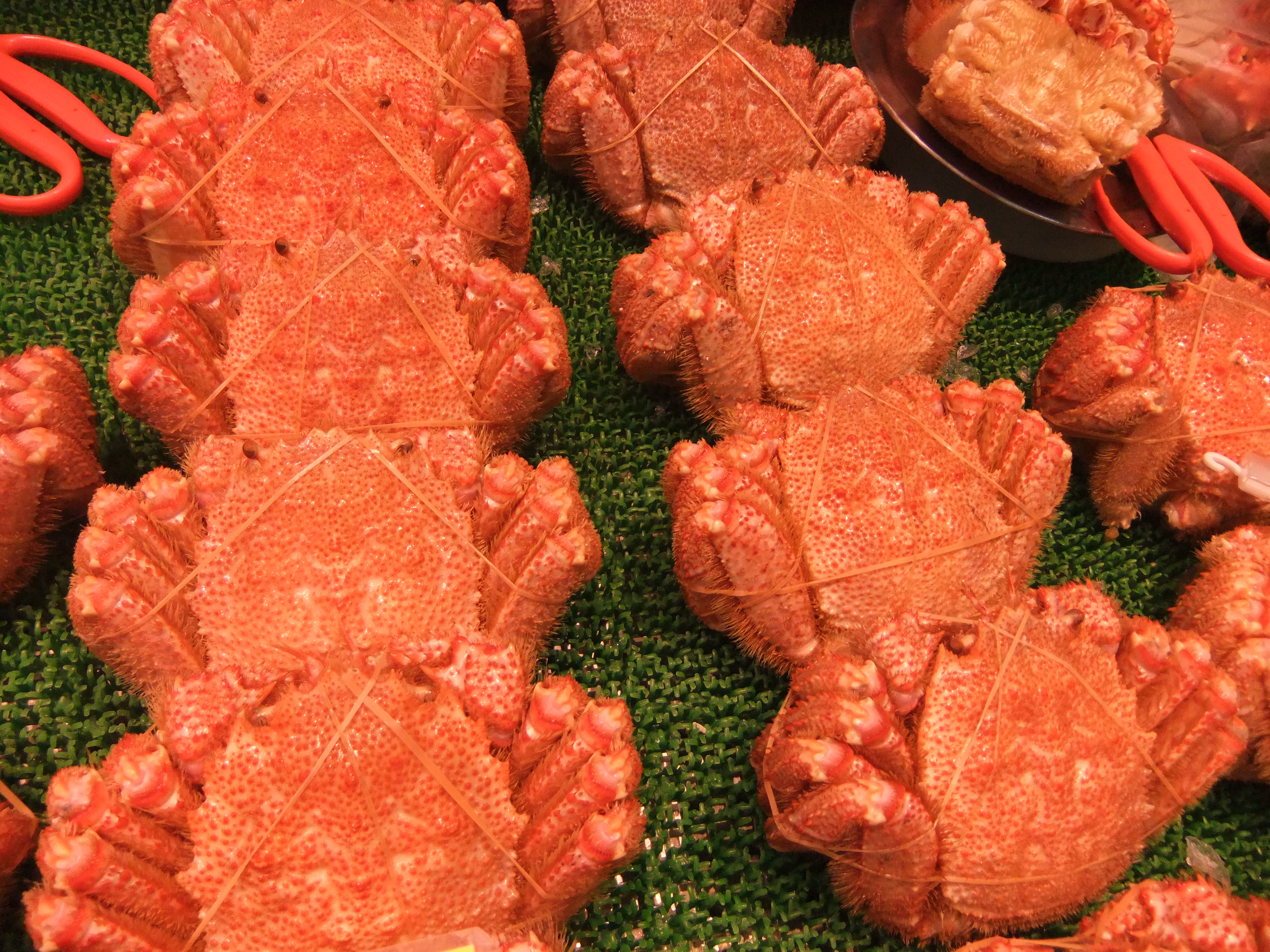

== Life cycle ==
The embryonic development of the species can be divided into nine stages, each defined by cleavage and formation of distinct appendages. To incubate the eggs after spawning, females attach them to their pleopods. Based on many surveys conducted during the spawning and hatching seasons, the incubation period of the species is estimated to be over a year, with the embryonic growth rate mainly being controlled by the temperature of the water. Young hatch between March and May and remain as zooplankton until they reach the bottom of the sea by July. The hatching process occurs during the spring phytoplankton bloom in the Sea of Okhotsk. The zoea of this species can be mistaken for the two other species in the same family, but E. isenbeckii zoea lack carapace spines and have shorter lateral spines on the fork of the telson.
