= St. Lucie County, Florida =

County in Florida, United States

- County
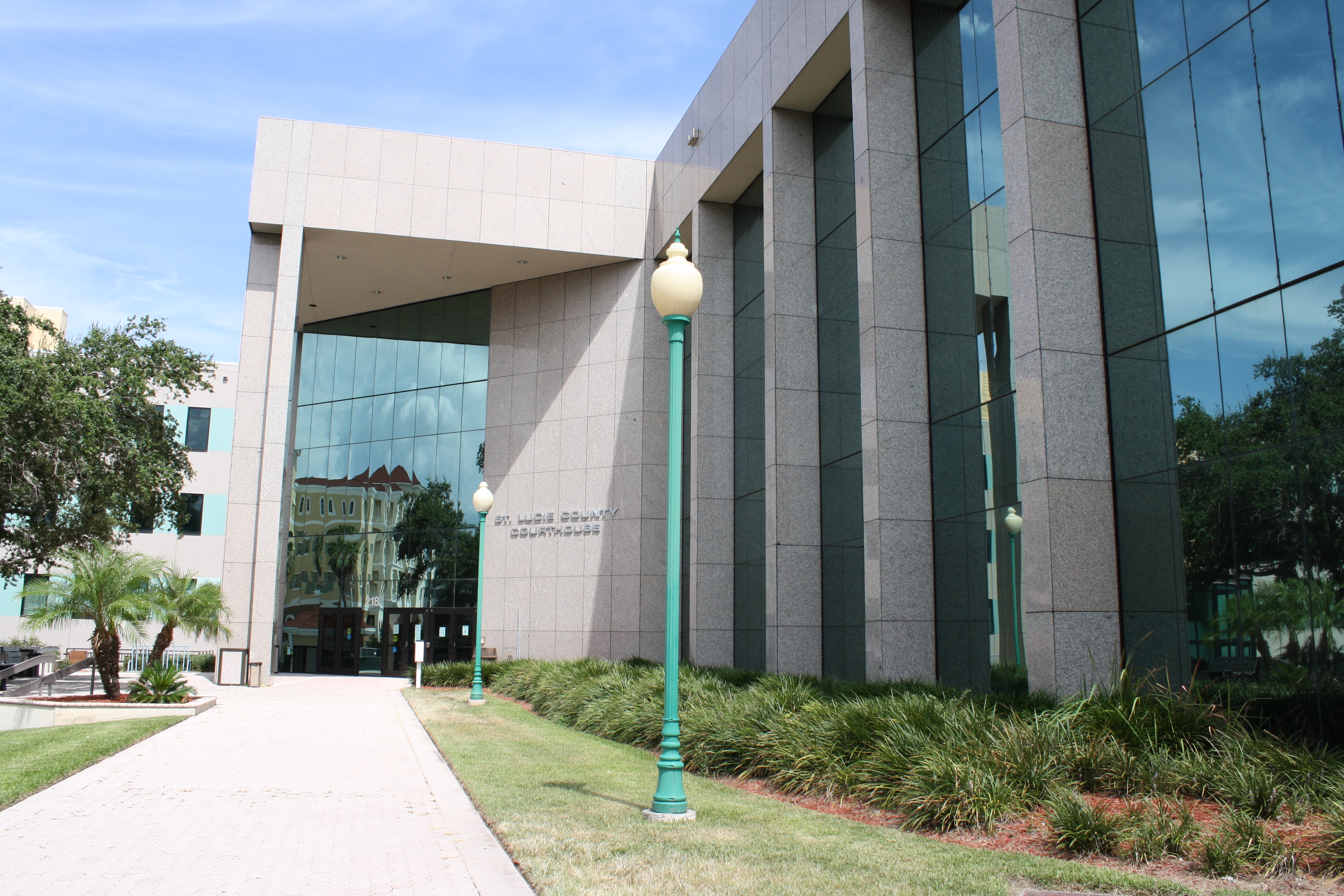
- St. Lucie County Courthouse

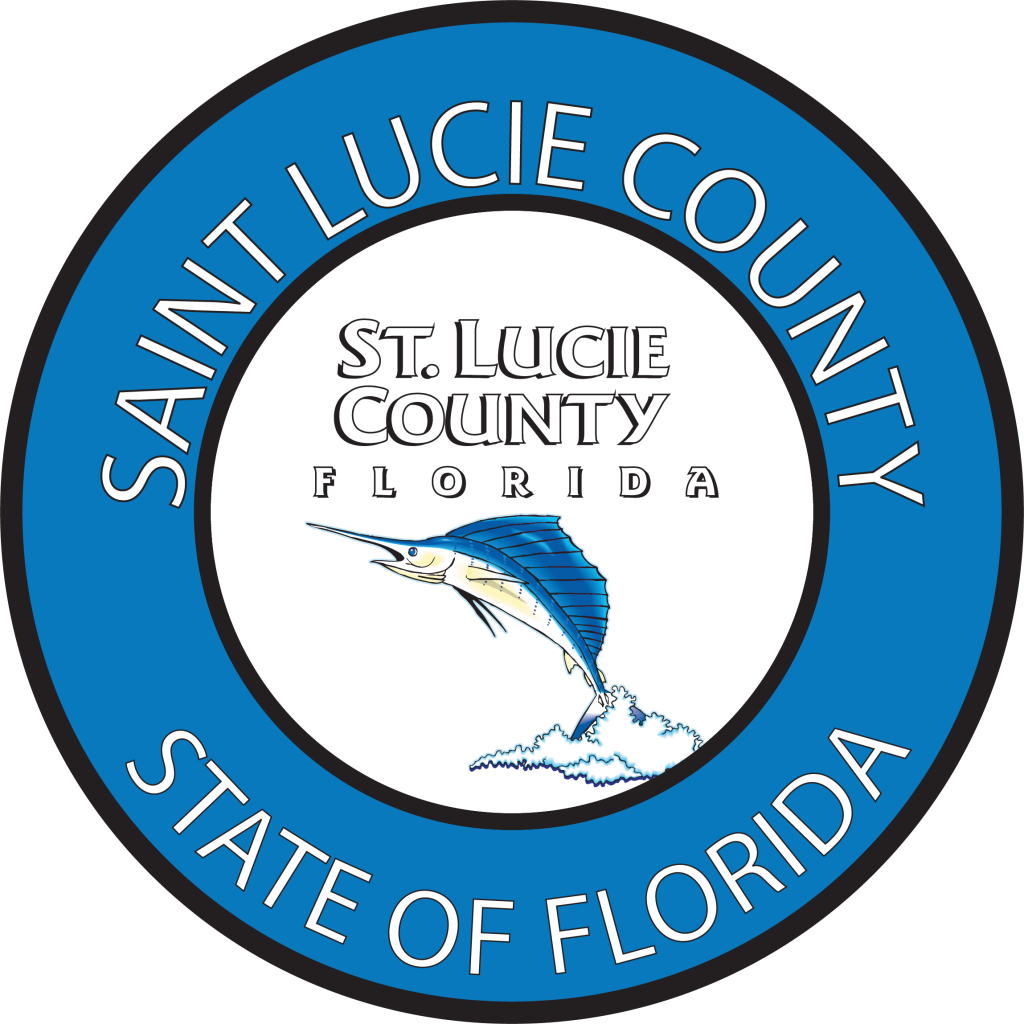
- Seal

- Location within the U.S. state of Florida
- Coordinates: 27°23′N 80°26′W
- Country: United States
- State: Florida
- Founded: May 24, 1905
- Named for: St. Lucie Inlet
- Seat: Fort Pierce
- Largest city: Port St. Lucie

Area
  - Total: 688 sq mi (1,780 km^{2})
  - Land: 572 sq mi (1,480 km^{2})
  - Water: 116 sq mi (300 km^{2}) 16.9%

Population (2020)
  - Total: 329,226
  - Estimate (2025): 402,449 ▲
  - Density: 576/sq mi (222/km^{2})
- Time zone: UTC−5 (Eastern)
  - Summer (DST): UTC−4 (EDT)
- Congressional district: 21st
- Interstates: link = Interstate 95 in Florida
- U.S. Routes: link = U.S. Route 1 in Florida
- State roads: link = Florida's Turnpike link = Florida State Road A1A
- Website: www.stlucieco.gov

St. Lucie County (Spanish: Condado de Santa Lucía) is a county located in the southeastern portion of the U.S. state of Florida. As of the 2020 census, the population was 329,226. The county's seat is Fort Pierce, while the largest city is Port St. Lucie, which makes up 62% of the county's population. St. Lucie County is the principal county of the Port St. Lucie, FL Metropolitan Statistical Area.

== History ==
The area was originally inhabited by the Ais tribe, a hunter-gatherer culture whose territory extended from south of the St. John's river to the St. Lucie Inlet. Spanish explorers frequently encountered the fierce tribe as the Spanish treasure routes ran parallel in order to take advantage of the strong Gulfstream current. The area was given several names by the Spanish including Rio de Ays (later changed to Indian River) as well as Santa Lucia, named after the short-lived late 16th-century Spanish fort that bore its name farther south. The fabled 1715 Spanish treasure fleet sank off the area that is now St. Lucie County, leading to the regional naming of the area as the Treasure Coast.

During the early 19th century, the Spanish government issued several land grants in the area, one of which went to settler James Hutchinson. The grant contained 2,000 acres (8.1 km^{2}) and today the barrier island Hutchinson Island still retains his name. During the mid-1800s, Seminoles and runaway slaves sought refuge in the virtually uninhabited area. By 1837 the Second Seminole war had broken out in Florida. In December 1837, a group of soldiers under the command of Lt. Colonel Benjamin K. Pierce sailed down the Indian River and established a fort, naming it after their commander. Today the county seat of St. Lucie County is still known as Fort Pierce. In 1841, the United States government began issuing land grants under the Armed Occupation Act to Americans who were willing to settle the area. Several of these grants were within the boundaries of today's St. Lucie County. The Third Seminole War in 1851 saw the building of a second major American fort in the area, Fort Capron, located in the area that is today's St. Lucie Village.

From this point on the area became gradually more populated as settlers ventured down for health and economic reasons. The Flagler railroad reached the area in the 1890s. Major industries at the end of the 19th century in the area included pineapple, fishing and seafood canning and cattle. Citrus would not become a major crop until the early 1900s. The city of Fort Pierce was chartered in 1901.

Up until 1905 the area had been under Brevard County (although Brevard County had been named St. Lucie County from 1844 until 1855 when it was renamed Brevard County). During the summer of 1905, St. Lucie County was created from the southern part of Brevard County with the county seat being at Fort Pierce. Other settlements at the time in St. Lucie County's boundaries included Jensen, Eden, Anknona, Walton, Eldred, White City, Viking, St. Lucie, Oslo, Vero, Quay, Sebastian and others. In 1925, Indian River County was created out of the northern part of St. Lucie County, while Martin County was created from a small part of southeastern St. Lucie County and the northern part of Palm Beach County during that same year. Much of western St Lucie County had already gone in 1917 to form Okeechobee County.

The 1920s saw increased land speculation and planned developments such as Indrio and San Lucie that never came to fruition due to the bust in 1929. During World War II the United States Naval Amphibious Training Base was established in Fort Pierce on North and South Hutchinson Island. During its operation over 140,000 troops were processed through the base. The post-war years saw a major population boom in the area, some of which were returning sailors and their families that had undergone training at the Navy base.

In 1958, the General Development Corporation, a subsidiary of Mackle Brothers, bought tens of thousands of acres of land along the St. Lucie River in the southern part of the county in order to build a new community. Colorful and clever advertising soon drew thousands of northeastern retirees and families to the area, laying the foundation for the future city of Port St. Lucie. Population and building booms in the late 20th century led to the formation of other areas west and south of Port St. Lucie including St. Lucie West and the new master planned community of Tradition. The early 21st century brought many trials for the county including two major hurricanes in 2004 and an economic and housing slump starting in 2008. In 2005, St. Lucie County celebrated its 100th birthday.

=== Hurricane Milton tornado outbreak ===
On October 9, 2024, St. Lucie County was part of a prolific tornado outbreak caused by Hurricane Milton. Six fatalities occurred in the county after a 155 mph EF-3 tornado struck the Spanish Lakes neighborhood of Lakewood Park.

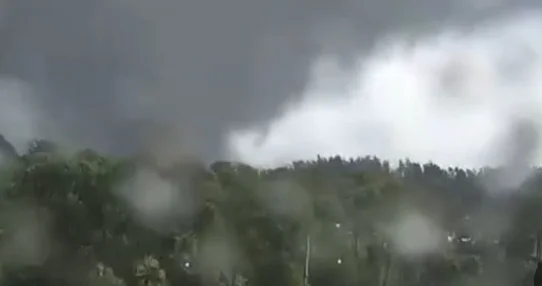
EF-3 Tornado at peak intensity near Fort Pierce

This intense tornado destroyed the largest warehouse on the Treasure Coast, located in Fort Pierce, before moving into Lakewood Park.

== Geography ==
According to the U.S. Census Bureau, the county has a total area of 688 square miles (1,780 km^{2}), of which 572 square miles (1,480 km^{2}) is land and 116 square miles (300 km^{2}) (16.9%) is water.

=== Adjacent counties ===
- Indian River County - north
- Martin County - south
- Okeechobee County - west

== Transportation ==
=== Airports ===
- St. Lucie County International Airport, a general aviation airport. The nearest commercial airports are in Melbourne, Vero Beach, and West Palm Beach.

=== Major highways ===
- I-95
- Florida's Turnpike
- US 1
- SR A1A
- SR 68
- SR 70
- SR 607
- SR 608
- SR 614
- SR 615
- SR 713
- SR 716

=== Public bus service ===
St. Lucie County is served by the St. Lucie Transportation Planning Organization (TPO). The TPO is a Metropolitan Planning Organization (MPO), a federally mandated and federally funded transportation policy-making organization responsible for transportation planning, programming, and financing of State and Federal Transportation Funds for St. Lucie County. The TPO is governed by a TPO Board, which is composed of elected officials, representatives from the St. Lucie County School Board, and representatives from Community Transit, a division of The Council on Aging of St. Lucie, Inc. The original bus system started out as a demand response service bus in the 1990s, it only served St. Lucie County. Soon it expanded to a fixed route system, going to predetermined locations along a route. On June 3, 2002, the Florida Department of Transportation (FDOT) approved funding, expanding the bus service to Martin County, and became the Treasure Coast Connector.

=== Passenger trains ===
Until 1968, the Florida East Coast Railway provided service between Jacksonville and Miami, with stops in Fort Pierce and Jensen Beach. Until 1963, long-distance passenger trains of the Illinois Central (the City of Miami) and the Louisville and Nashville (the Dixie Flagler and the South Wind) from Chicago, and the Atlantic Coast Line from New York City (the East Coast Champion, the Havana Special, and the winter-only Florida Special), made stops in Fort Pierce.

In 2023, Brightline, an inter-city rail route that currently runs between Miami and Orlando, announced that it was looking for a site for a new station on the Treasure Coast. As of 2024, there are no plans to add a station in St. Lucie County, but rather in nearby Martin County for the Stuart station.

== Demographics ==
Historical population
Census	Pop.	Note	%±
1910	4,075		—
1920	7,886		93.5%
1930	7,057		−10.5%
1940	11,871		68.2%
1950	20,180		70.0%
1960	39,294		94.7%
1970	50,836		29.4%
1980	87,182		71.5%
1990	150,171		72.3%
2000	192,695		28.3%
2010	277,789		44.2%
2020	329,226		18.5%
2025 (est.)	402,449	▲	22.2%
U.S. Decennial Census; 1790-1960 1900-1990; 1990-2000 2010-2019

=== Racial and ethnic composition ===
St. Lucie County, Florida – Racial and ethnic composition Note: the US Census treats Hispanic/Latino as an ethnic category. This table excludes Latinos from the racial categories and assigns them to a separate category. Hispanics/Latinos may be of any race.
Race / Ethnicity (NH = Non-Hispanic)	Pop 1980	Pop 1990	Pop 2000	Pop 2010	Pop 2020	% 1980	% 1990	% 2000	% 2010	% 2020
White alone (NH)	66,034	118,646	142,768	170,032	176,533	75.74%	79.01%	74.09%	61.21%	53.62%
Black or African American alone (NH)	18,860	24,200	29,148	51,373	64,597	21.63%	16.11%	15.13%	18.49%	19.62%
Native American or Alaska Native alone (NH)	138	306	396	664	568	0.16%	0.20%	0.21%	0.24%	0.17%
Asian alone (NH)	316	987	1,803	4,226	5,678	0.36%	0.66%	0.94%	1.52%	1.72%
Native Hawaiian or Pacific Islander alone (NH)	x	x	63	127	141	x	x	0.03%	0.05%	0.04%
Other race alone (NH)	92	80	283	845	2,470	0.11%	0.05%	0.15%	0.30%	0.75%
Mixed race or Multiracial (NH)	x	x	2,501	4,527	12,919	x	x	1.30%	1.63%	3.92%
Hispanic or Latino (any race)	1,742	5,952	15,733	45,995	66,320	2.00%	3.96%	8.16%	16.56%	20.14%
Total	87,182	150,171	192,695	277,789	329,226	100.00%	100.00%	100.00%	100.00%	100.00%

=== 2020 census ===
As of the 2020 census, the county had a population of 329,226, 128,997 households, and 88,835 families, which produced a population density of 575.9 people per square mile (222.4/km^{2}). The median age was 45.9 years, and 19.9% of residents were under the age of 18.

7.3% of residents were from 18 to 24, 21.7% from 25 to 44, 26.9% from 45 to 64, and 24.2% were 65 years of age or older. For every 100 females there were 94.4 males, and for every 100 females age 18 and over there were 91.8 males age 18 and over.

The racial makeup of the county was 58.38% (192,202) white or European American (53.62% non-Hispanic white), 20.17% (66,407) black or African-American, 0.42% (1,398) Native American or Alaska Native, 1.77% (5,818) Asian, 0.06% (185) Pacific Islander or Native Hawaiian, 6.73% (22,160) from other races, and 12.47% (41,056) from two or more races. Hispanic or Latino residents of any race comprised 20.14% (66,320) of the population.

96.5% of residents lived in urban areas, while 3.5% lived in rural areas.

Of the 128,997 households, 27.5% had children under the age of 18 living in them, 49.0% were married-couple households, 16.6% were households with a male householder and no spouse or partner present, and 26.9% were households with a female householder and no spouse or partner present. About 24.5% of all households were made up of individuals, 13.4% had someone living alone who was 65 years of age or older, the average household size was 2.7, and the average family size was 3.2.

There were 147,884 housing units at an average density of 258.7 per square mile (99.9/km^{2}), of which 12.8% were vacant. Among occupied housing units, 74.6% were owner-occupied and 25.4% were renter-occupied; the homeowner vacancy rate was 2.2% and the rental vacancy rate was 8.6%.

The percent of those with a bachelor’s degree or higher was estimated to be 16.6% of the population.

The 2016–2020 5-year American Community Survey estimates show that the median household income was $55,237 (with a margin of error of +/- $1,568). The median family income was $62,950 (+/- $2,262). Males had a median income of $35,327 (+/- $1,197) versus $26,564 (+/- $1,036) for females. The median income for those above 16 years old was $30,891 (+/- $541). Approximately, 9.0% of families and 13.1% of the population were below the poverty line, including 19.0% of those under the age of 18 and 10.2% of those ages 65 or over.

=== 2010 census ===
As of the census of 2010, there were 277,789 people, 108,523 households, and 74,963 families residing in the county. The population density was 485.7 people per square mile. There were 137,029 housing units at an average density of 239.6 per square mile. The racial makeup of the county was 71.8% White, 19.1% African American, 0.4% Native American, 1.6% Asian, 0.1% Pacific Islander, 4.5% from other races, and 2.6% from two or more races. Hispanic or Latino of any race were 16.6% of the population.

According to the 2015 American Community Survey, 90.7% spoke English, 14.6% Spanish, 5.0% Other Indo-European languages, and 1.2% Asian and Pacific Island languages.

In 2010 there were 108,523 households, out of which 26.30% had children under the age of 18 living with them, 51.0% were married couples living together, 12.9% had a female householder with no husband present, and 30.9% were non-families. 24.2% of all non-family households were made up of individuals living alone, and 11.7% had someone living alone who was 65 years of age or older. The average household size was 2.53 and the average family size was 2.99.

In the county, the population was spread out, with 77.7% 18 years of age and over; 23.2% from 25 to 44, 26.8% from 45 to 64, and 19.9% who were 65 years of age or older. The median age was 42.4 years.

According to the 2010 census, the median income for a household in the county was $36,363, and the median income for a family was $41,381. Males had a median income of $30,047 versus $22,684 for females. The per capita income for the county was $18,790. About 9.60% of families and 13.40% of the population were below the poverty line, including 20.50% of those under age 18 and 7.70% of those age 65 or over.

=== 2000 census ===
According to census of 2000, the largest ancestry groups in St. Lucie County were: English 34%, African 15%, Irish 14%, German 13%, Italian 10%. For every 100 females, there were 95.50 males. For every 100 females age 18 and over, there were 92.80 males.

== Fauna ==
Six bird species in St. Lucie County are listed as "highly vulnerable" to climate change:

- Red-headed woodpecker
- Gray kingbird
- Fish crow
- Brown thrasher
- Eastern towhee
- Boat-tailed grackle

== Politics ==
According to St. Lucie County Supervisor of Elections website, registered voters as of September 10, 2020, totaled 217,666: Democratic 85,714, Republican 72,554, NPA 56,500, Other 2,898. In recent decades, St. Lucie County had previously favored the Democratic Party, but it voted for Republican Party candidate Donald Trump in the last three elections, signaling a significant rightward shift along with the state as a whole.

United States presidential election results for St. Lucie County, Florida
Year	Republican		Democratic		Third party(ies)	
Year	No.	%	No.	%	No.	%
1908	63	14.52%	280	64.52%	91	20.97%
1912	45	8.89%	352	69.57%	109	21.54%
1916	134	13.14%	703	68.92%	183	17.94%
1920	707	35.40%	1,167	58.44%	123	6.16%
1924	524	36.95%	722	50.92%	172	12.13%
1928	983	55.88%	741	42.13%	35	1.99%
1932	390	19.58%	1,602	80.42%	0	0.00%
1936	497	20.34%	1,946	79.66%	0	0.00%
1940	962	30.73%	2,169	69.27%	0	0.00%
1944	920	30.17%	2,129	69.83%	0	0.00%
1948	1,689	38.04%	1,704	38.38%	1,047	23.58%
1952	4,667	62.65%	2,782	37.35%	0	0.00%
1956	5,435	66.56%	2,731	33.44%	0	0.00%
1960	6,354	54.24%	5,360	45.76%	0	0.00%
1964	7,204	48.18%	7,748	51.82%	0	0.00%
1968	7,281	43.02%	5,232	30.92%	4,410	26.06%
1972	14,258	75.40%	4,593	24.29%	59	0.31%
1976	11,502	47.51%	12,386	51.16%	321	1.33%
1980	18,126	60.76%	10,347	34.69%	1,357	4.55%
1984	28,200	68.37%	13,040	31.61%	7	0.02%
1988	32,319	64.54%	17,446	34.84%	314	0.63%
1992	24,400	35.76%	23,876	34.99%	19,957	29.25%
1996	28,899	39.10%	36,169	48.94%	8,838	11.96%
2000	34,705	44.50%	41,560	53.29%	1,725	2.21%
2004	47,592	47.56%	51,835	51.80%	636	0.64%
2008	52,512	43.41%	67,125	55.49%	1,337	1.11%
2012	56,202	45.58%	65,869	53.42%	1,230	1.00%
2016	70,289	49.50%	66,881	47.10%	4,823	3.40%
2020	86,831	50.38%	84,137	48.82%	1,381	0.80%
2024	100,293	54.17%	83,517	45.11%	1,321	0.71%

== Education ==
Schools in the county are managed by St. Lucie County Public Schools.

- Florida Atlantic University Harbor Branch Oceanographic Institute
- Indian River State College Ft. Pierce and PSL Campus
- Keiser University PSL Campus
- University of Florida Institute of Food and Agricultural Sciences, Ft. Pierce

== Libraries ==
St. Lucie County is served by the St. Lucie County Library System.

== Points of interest ==
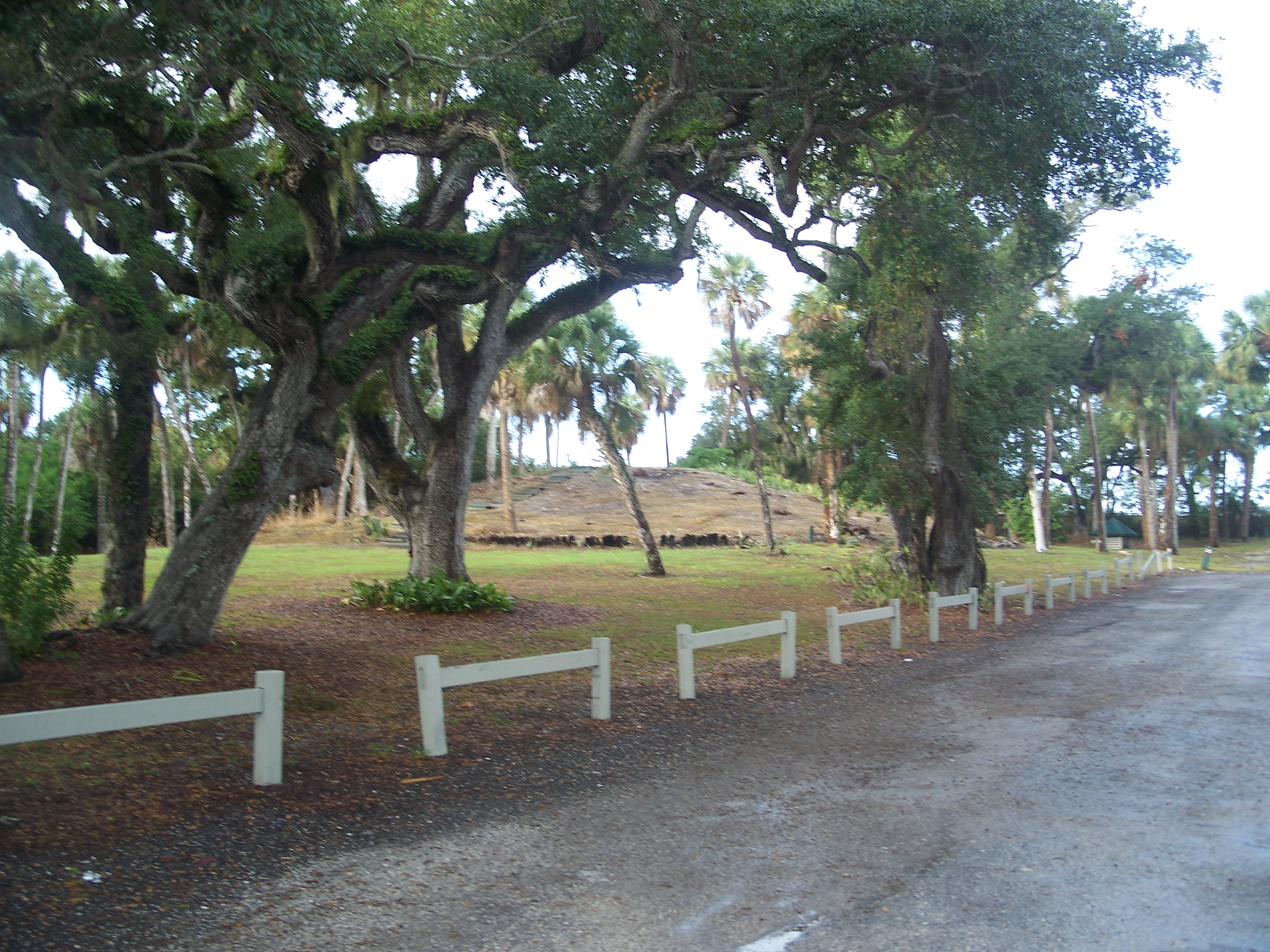
Old Fort Park

- Experimental Oculina Research Reserve
- Heathcote Botanical Gardens
- Navy UDT-SEAL Museum (Fort Pierce was the original home of the Navy SEALs)
- Old Fort Park
- St. Lucie County Aquarium
- St. Lucie County International Airport
- St. Lucie County Regional History Center

== Communities ==
=== Cities ===
- Fort Pierce
- Port St. Lucie

=== Towns ===
- St. Lucie Village

=== Census designated places ===
- Fort Pierce North
- Fort Pierce South
- Hutchinson Island South
- Indian River Estates
- Lakewood Park
- River Park
- White City

=== Unincorporated communities ===
- Viking

== See also ==
- National Register of Historic Places listings in St. Lucie County, Florida
