= St. Lucie County Library System =

Coordinates: 27.4483°N 80.3222°W

The St. Lucie County Library System, based in St. Lucie County, Florida, has branches in the cities of Fort Pierce and Port St. Lucie.

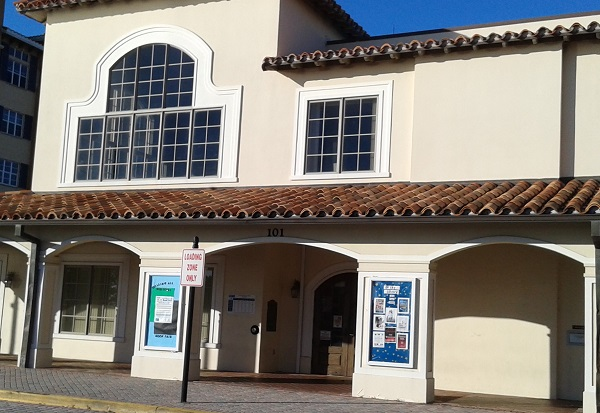
Fort Pierce Branch at 101 Melody Lane

== History ==
The residents of Fort Pierce created and began maintaining a reading room in 1903 to loan out books donated by churches and other civic organizations. In 1913, the Women's Club residence was built and the organization volunteered to house and manage the "reading room."

The St. Lucie County Library System began when the St. Lucie County Library Association was established in 1946 with a bequeath of the late P. P. Cobb, a prominent citizen of Fort Pierce. With only $1,000 from Cobb, the Library Association started working towards the building of a proper library. Under the supervision of the head of the Finance Committee, future Governor of Florida Dan McCarty, the association raised $15,000 by door-to-door petitions. Also, the city of Fort Pierce donated two lots located on Second Street and Atlantic Avenue, which were sold to the News Tribune for $8,250, raising the total amount in the treasury to $23,000.

Using the money raised by the Library Association, on May 1, 1954, the Fort Pierce branch of the St. Lucie County Library System opened with its own librarian, the first county-supported library in the state of Florida. Its original collection was made up of 1,000 books from the old reading room and another 2,000 loaned from the State Library of Florida. More books and furniture were donated by surrounding churches, civic organizations, and local residents.

In 1958, the St. Lucie County Library Association entered into a deal with the Okeechobee County Commission to form a regional library system. Each county had only one library and the one in Fort Pierce was designated as the headquarters. The St. Lucie-Okeechobee Regional Library System was dissolved in 1977 with each library's service obligation resorted to its own county, and the St. Lucie Library System was incorporated into the St. Lucie County government.

During the 2004 hurricane season, the Fort Pierce library sustained damage from two broken windows due to gale-force winds which allowed water to get inside the building.

On June 18, 2013, the Board approved the contract for sale and purchase of a building located at 2950 Rosser Boulevard, Port St. Lucie, Florida for the use of a future Southwest Library facility. The building, previously a City of Port St. Lucie Police Substation, will require major renovations in order to function as a County Library. Staffing and operating the library are expected to cost $571,000 when the facility opens in fiscal year 2015 or 2016.

== Facilities ==
The St. Lucie County Public Library System consists of six branch libraries and the Pruitt Campus Library, a joint-use facility operated in cooperation with Indian River State College. In 2012, the libraries had a total patron visit count, both physically and virtually, of 813,915. Also, in 2012, the library system had a total of 141,795 registered borrowers. In 2019, the libraries had a total of 732,872 In-Person visits and 385,295 Online Visits. In 2019, the total of 181,899 registered borrowers.

The branches are:

- Fort Pierce Library (formally known as the Main Library)
- Lakewood Park Library
- Morningside Library
- Port St. Lucie Library
- Zora Neale Hurston Library
- Paula A. Lewis Library
- Pruitt Campus (a joint facility with Indian River State College)

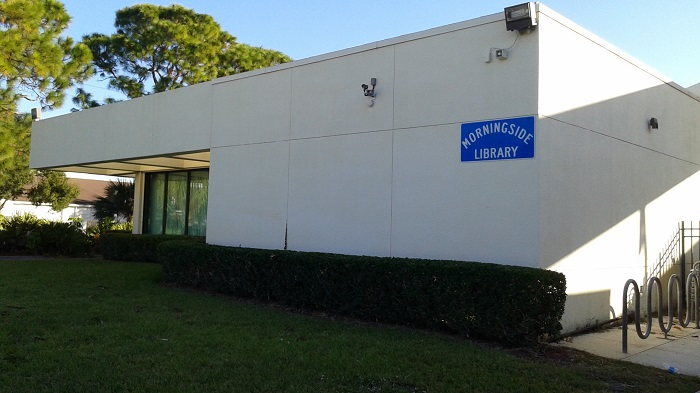
Morningside branch off PSL Blvd

== Circulation and collection ==
Facilities: Sq. Footage
Fort Pierce Branch: 23,000
Hurston Branch: 9,500
Lakewood Park Branch: 10,000
Morningside Branch: 19,000
Port St. Lucie Branch: 4,400
Paula A. Lewis Branch: 21,000
Pruitt Campus Library: 25,000
Total: 111,900

Fiscal Year 2012 Statistical and Financial Summaries:

The St. Lucie County Library System had a total circulation of 719,823 in 2012.

- Print: 260,118
- Media: 17,294
- E-books and e-audiobooks: 1,400
- Databases: 61
- Annual print subscriptions: 464

Fiscal Year 2019 Statistical and Financial Summaries:

The St. Lucie County Library System had a total circulation of 829,552 in 2019.

- Books: 272,311
- CD, DVD & VHS: 38,809
- E-Books & Online Audio: 8,765
- Databases: 81
- Annual Print Subscriptions: 381
- Available Public Computers: 183
- Programs: 1,786
