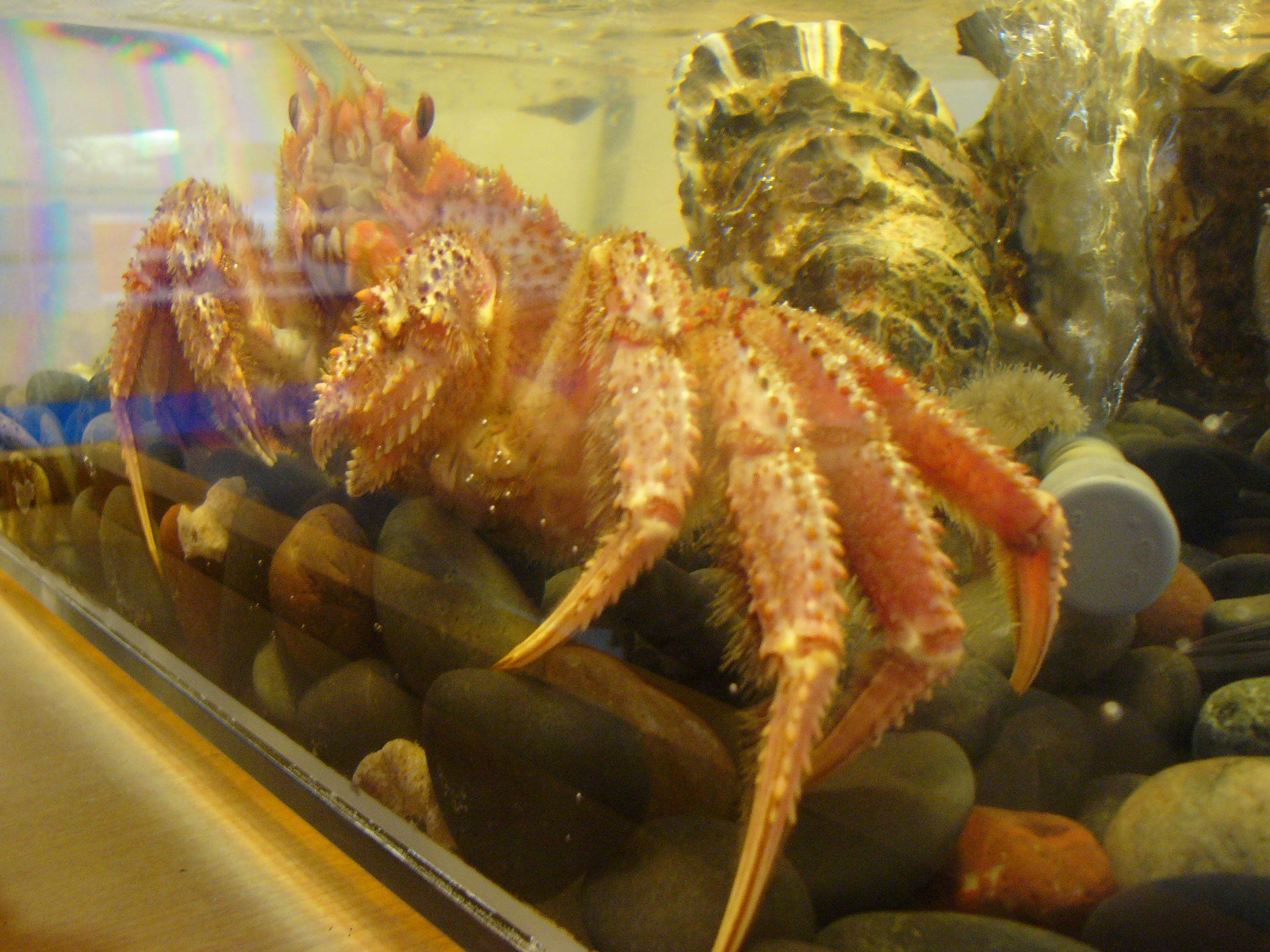
- Erimacrus isenbeckii

Scientific classification
- Kingdom: Animalia
- Phylum: Arthropoda
- Clade: Pancrustacea
- Class: Malacostraca
- Order: Decapoda
- Suborder: Pleocyemata
- Infraorder: Brachyura
- Superfamily: Cancroidea
- Family: Cheiragonidae; Ortmann, 1893

Synonyms
- Telmessidae Guinot, 1977

= Cheiragonidae =

Cheiragonidae Temporal range: Eocene–Recent

Family of crabs

Cheiragonidae is a small family of crabs, sometimes called helmet crabs, placed in its own superfamily, Cheriagonoidea. It comprises three extant species, Erimacrus isenbeckii, Telmessus acutidens and Telmessus cheiragonus; there are no yet evidences of Cheiragonidae in the fossil record. Many of these crabs were formerly treated as members of the Atelecyclidae.
