= St. Lucie County Aquarium =

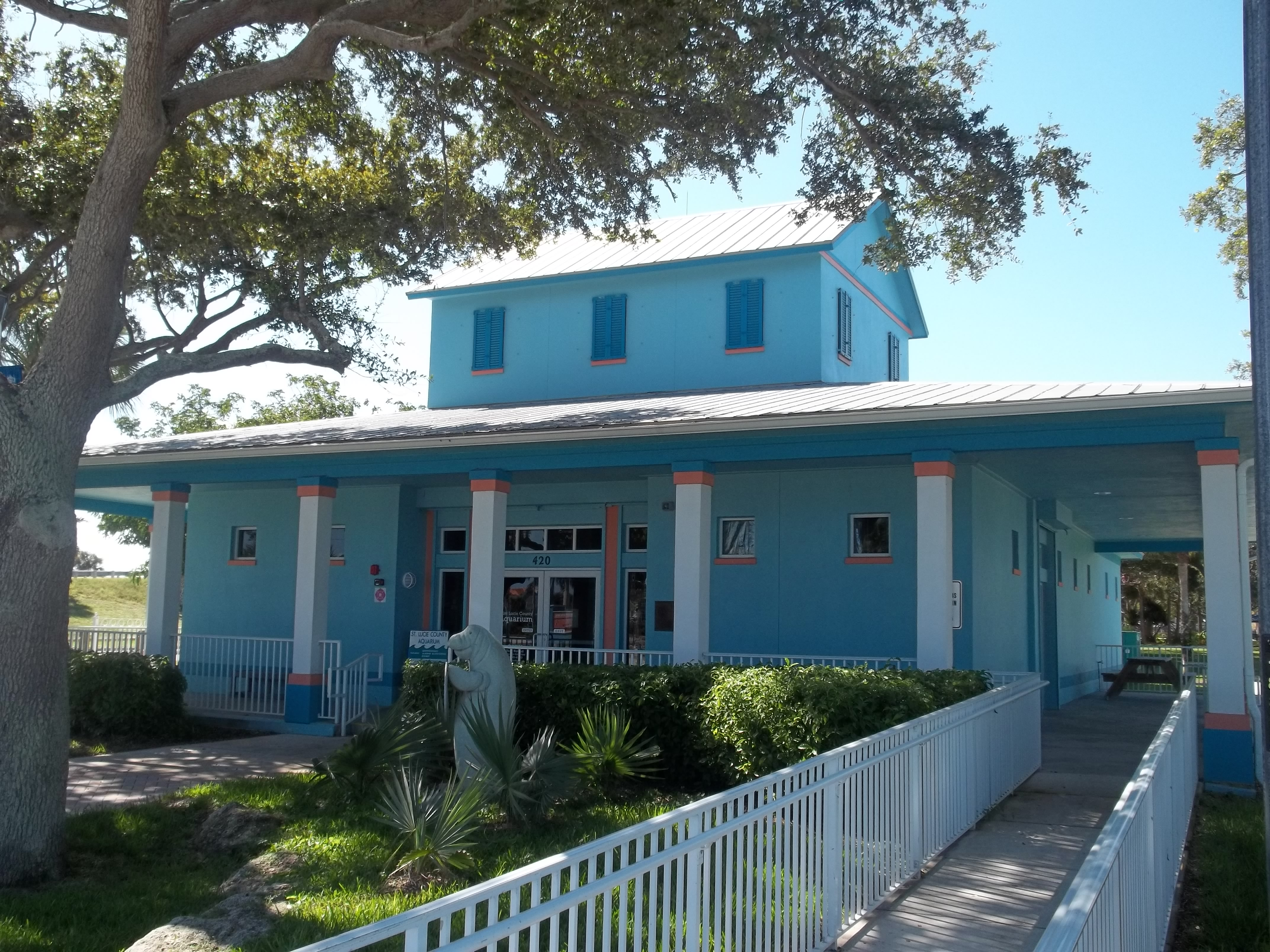
- Interactive map of St. Lucie County Aquarium
- 27°27′38″N 80°18′52″W
- Location: Fort Pierce, Florida
- Land area: 5,000 square feet (460 m^{2})
- Volume of largest tank: 3,000 US gallons (11,000 L)
- Total volume of tanks: 8,000 US gallons (30,000 L)
- Major exhibits: 6
- Owner: St. Lucie County, Florida

St. Lucie County Aquarium is a public aquarium in Fort Pierce, St. Lucie County, Florida. It contains the Smithsonian Marine Ecosystems Exhibit, which is a 3000-gallon model of a coral reef ecosystem; the exhibit was retired in 2000 from the National Museum of Natural History. The other exhibits represent ecosystems of the Indian River Lagoon and the surrounding coast.
