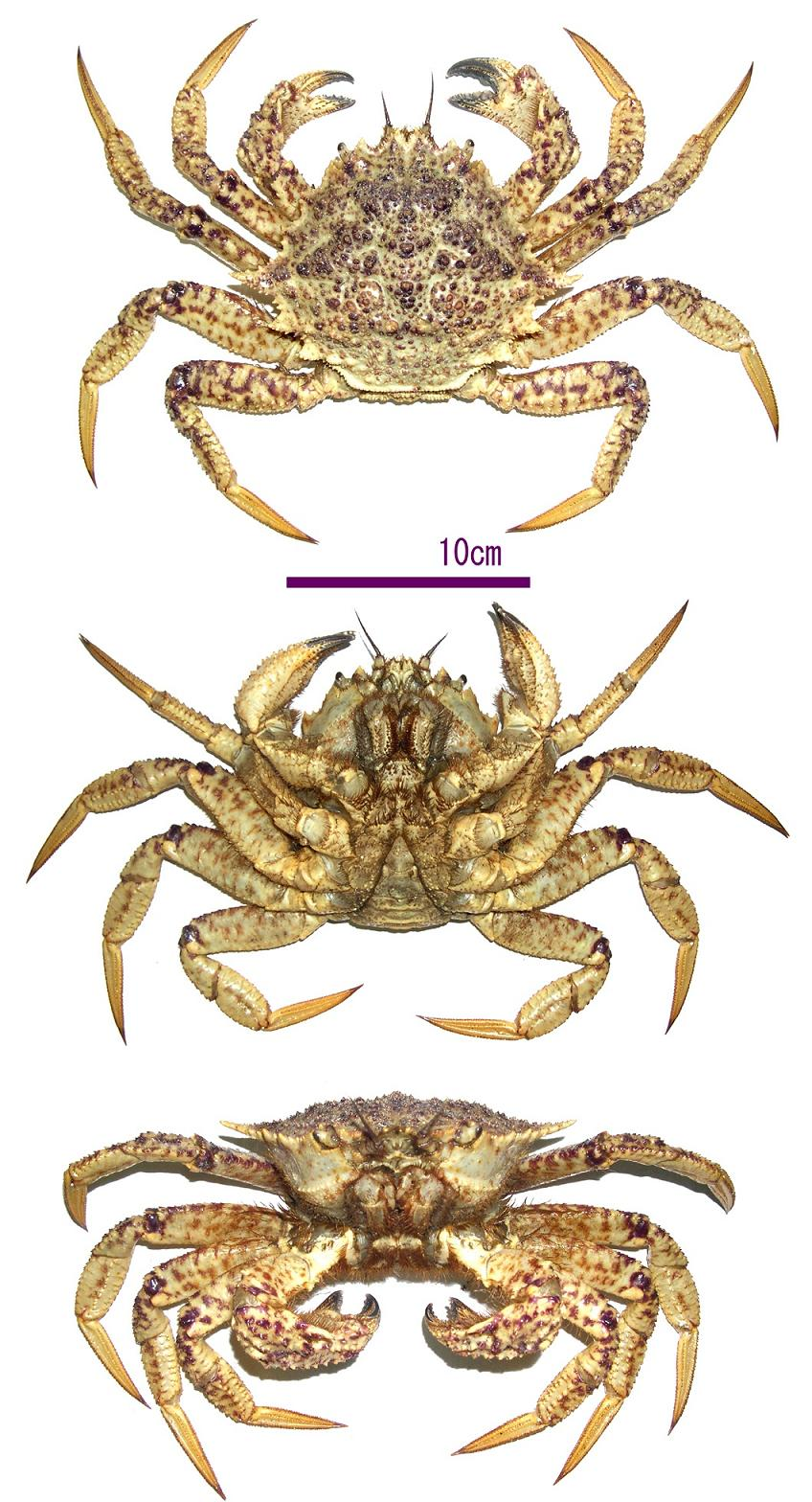

Scientific classification
- Kingdom: Animalia
- Phylum: Arthropoda
- Clade: Pancrustacea
- Class: Malacostraca
- Order: Decapoda
- Suborder: Pleocyemata
- Infraorder: Brachyura
- Family: Cheiragonidae
- Genus: Telmessus
- Species: T. cheiragonus

Binomial name
- Telmessus cheiragonus (Tilesius, 1815)

= Telmessus cheiragonus =

Species of crustacean

Telmessus cheiragonus is a species of crab of the family Cheiragonidae described by Tilesius in 1815. A common name for the species is "helmet crab".
