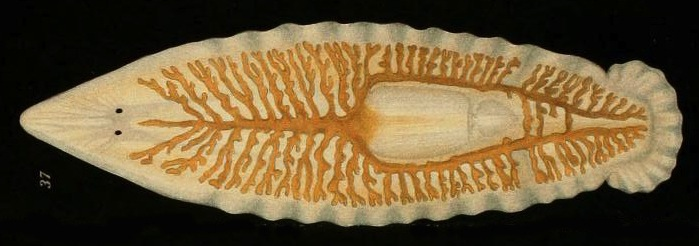
- Bdelloura candida

Scientific classification
- Kingdom: Animalia
- Phylum: Platyhelminthes
- Order: Tricladida
- Superfamily: Bdellouroidea
- Family: Bdellouridae; Diesing, 1862

Genera
- Bdellourinae; Palombiellinae

= Bdellouridae =

Family of flatworms

Bdellouridae is a family of Maricola triclads.

== Taxonomy ==
List of known genera:

- Family Bdellouridae
  - Subfamily Bdellourinae
    - Nerpa
    - Pentacoelum
    - Syncoelidium
    - Bdelloura
  - Subfamily Palombiellinae
    - Palombiella
    - Miava
    - Synsiphonium
