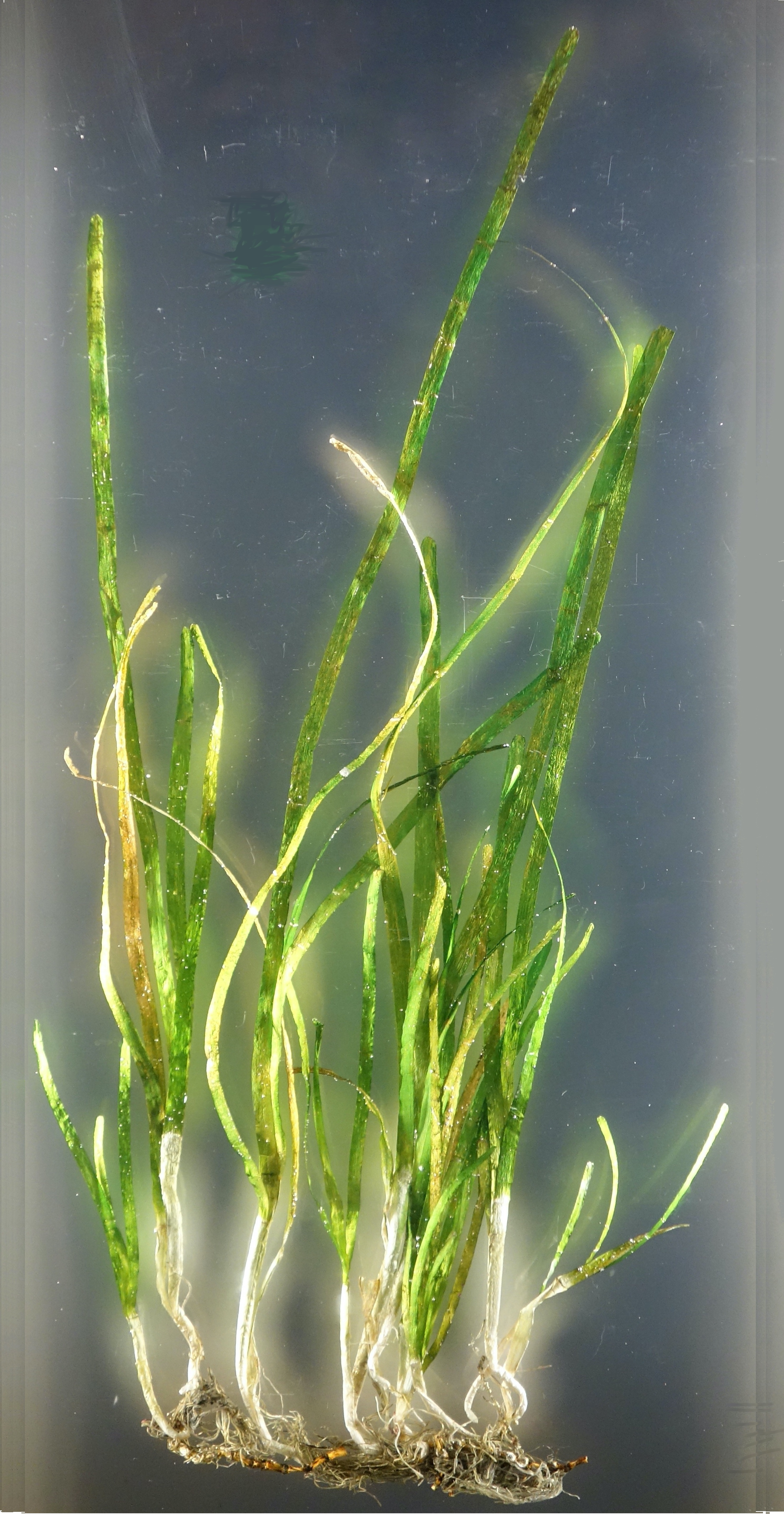

Conservation status
- Least Concern (IUCN 3.1)

Scientific classification
- Kingdom: Plantae
- Clade: Tracheophytes
- Clade: Angiosperms
- Clade: Monocots
- Order: Alismatales
- Family: Zosteraceae
- Genus: Zostera
- Species: Z. marina

Binomial name
- Zostera marina L.
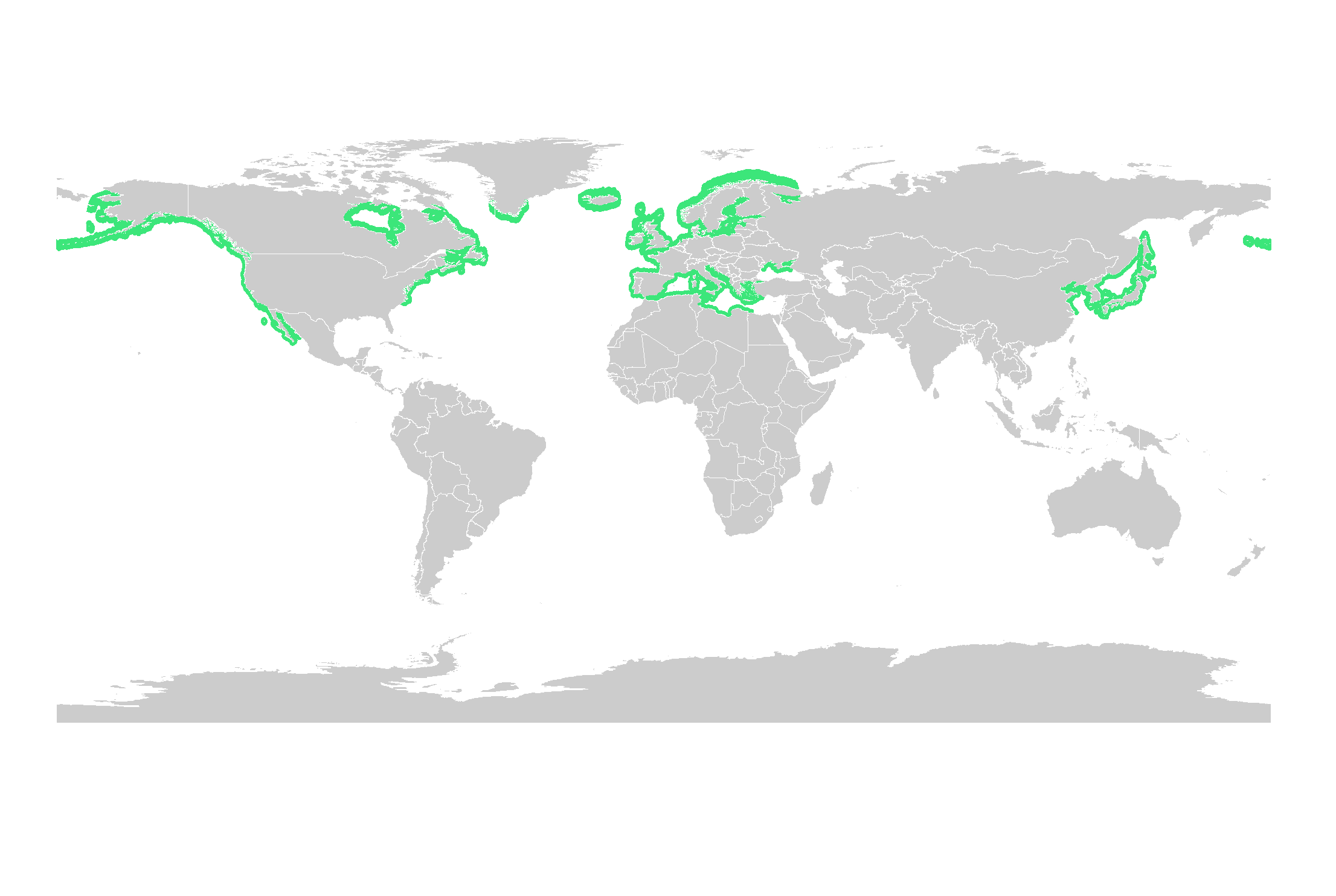
- Global distribution of Zostera marina

= Zostera marina =

Species of aquatic plant

Zostera marina is a flowering vascular plant species as one of many kinds of seagrass, with this species known primarily by the English name of common eelgrass or eelgrass, with seawrack much less used, and refers to the plant after breaking loose from the submerged wetland soil, and drifting free with ocean current and waves to a coast seashore. It is a saline soft-sediment submerged plant native to marine environments on the coastlines of northern latitudes from subtropical to subpolar regions of North America and Eurasia.

== Distribution ==
This species is the most wide-ranging marine flowering plant in the Northern Hemisphere and the most widespread species in the temperate northern hemisphere of Atlantic and Pacific Oceans. It lives in cooler ocean waters in the North Atlantic and North Pacific, and in the warmer southern parts of its range it dies off during warmer seasons. It grows in the Arctic region and endures several months of ice cover per year. It is the only seagrass known from Iceland. It can be found in bays, lagoons, estuaries, on beaches, and in other coastal habitat. The several ecotypes each have specific habitat requirements. It occurs in calmer waters in the sublittoral zone, where it is rarely exposed to air. It anchors via rhizomes in sandy or muddy substrates and its leaves catch particulate debris in the water which then collects around the bases of the plants, building up the top layer of the seabed.

== Description and reproduction ==
This flowering plant is a rhizomatous herb which produces a long stem with hairlike green leaves that measure up to 1.2 centimetres (0.47 in) wide and may reach over 1.0 metre (3 ft 3 in) long. It is a perennial plant, but it may grow as an annual. The rhizome grows horizontally through the substrate, anchoring via clusters of roots at nodes. The plant is monoecious, with an individual bearing both male and female flowers in separate alternating clusters. The inflorescence is about 10 cm long. The fruit is a nutlet with a transparent coat containing the seed. The plant can also undergo vegetative reproduction, sprouting repeatedly from its rhizome and spreading into a meadow-like colony on the seabed known as a genet. One meadow of cloned eelgrass was determined to be 3000 years old, genetically. When undergoing sexual reproduction, the plant produces large quantities of seeds, at times numbering several thousand seeds per square meter of plants. The plant disperses large distances when its stems break away and carry the fertile seeds to new areas, eventually dropping to the seabed. The seagrass is a favorite food of several species of waterfowl, which may also distribute the seeds.

== Ecology ==
This Zostera grows in muddy and sandy shores only at and below spring tides. This plant is an important member of the coastal ecosystem in many areas because it helps to physically form the habitat and it plays a crucial role for many other species. For example, it provides a sheltered spawning ground for the Pacific herring (Clupea pallasii). Juvenile Atlantic cod (Gadus morhua) hide in eelgrass beds as they grow. The blue mussel (Mytilus edulis) attaches to its leaves. The green alga Entocladia perforans, an endophyte, depends on this eelgrass. A great many animals use the plant for food, including the isopod Idotea chelipes and the purple sea urchin Paracentrotus lividus. The Atlantic brant (Branta bernicula hrota) subsists almost entirely on the plant. When the eelgrass dies, detaches, and washes up on the beach, a whole new ecosystem is founded; many species of insects and other invertebrates begin to inhabit the dead plant, including the amphipod Talitrus saltator, the fly Fucellia tergina, and the beetles Stenus biguttatus, Paederus littoralis, and Coccinella septempunctata.

The bacterial species Granulosicoccus coccoides was first isolated from the leaves of the plant.

== Threats ==
Populations of the plant have been damaged by a number of processes, especially increased turbidity in the water; like most other plants, eelgrass requires sunlight to grow. One plant may adapt to light level by growing longer leaves to reach the sun in low-light areas; individuals in clear or shallow water may have leaves a few centimeters long, while individuals in deeper spots may have leaves over a meter long. Human activities such as dredging and trawling damage eelgrass meadows; practices used in scallop and mussel harvesting in the Wadden Sea have cleared much eelgrass from the sea bottom there. Aquaculture operations and coastal development destroy colonies. Pollution from many sources, including riverside farms, sewage lines, fish processing plants, and oil spills, damage eelgrass meadows. Conservation and restoration efforts of Zostera marina habitats including transplants and seed-based restoration, have increased since their rapid decline started several decades ago.

Invasive species have been shown to have a negative effect on eelgrass and associated ecosystems. In Nova Scotia, the invasive European green crab (Carcinus maenas) destroys eelgrass when it digs in the substrate for prey items. Experimental work in Sweden has also shown that seed predation by the shore crab Carcinus maenas can reduce eelgrass recruitment, potentially contributing to feedbacks that slow natural recovery of degraded meadows. The decline of eelgrass in Antigonish Harbour has resulted in fewer Canada geese, which feed on the rhizome, and fewer common goldeneye, which eat invertebrates that live in eelgrass meadows.

The slime mold Labyrinthula zosterae caused a "wasting disease" of eelgrass resulting in large-scale losses in the 1930s; localized populations are still affected by the slime mold today. During this time, populations of the eelgrass-eating Atlantic brant dropped. Remaining geese ate less-preferred food plants and algae, and hunters subsequently noticed that brant meat began to taste different. Even today, brants no longer migrate over the Nova Scotia area.

== Genomics and evolutionary adaptations ==
The Zostera marina genome has been sequenced and analyzed by Olsen et al. in 2016 and the resulting article has been published in Nature. The approximate genome sequence of Z. marina is 202.3 Mb and encodes approximately 20450 protein-coding genes (of which 86,6% are supported by transcriptome data). The assembled genome was found to consist of large numbers of repeat elements accounting for 63% of the assembled genome. The researchers revealed key adaptations at the molecular biological level that have occurred during evolution of Z. marina, an angiosperm that has adopted a marine lifestyle. Genome analysis revealed that Z. marina lost the entire repertoire of stomatal genes, genes involved in volatile compound biosynthesis and signaling (such as ethylene and terpenoids) as well as genes for ultraviolet protection and phytochromes used for far-red sensing. Besides these gene losses, also gene gain events have been described, mostly involving the adjustment to full salinity and ion homeostasis. Also macro-algae like cell wall components (low-methylated polyanionic pectins and sulfated galactans) have been described, unique for Z. marina compared to other angiosperms.

== Human uses ==
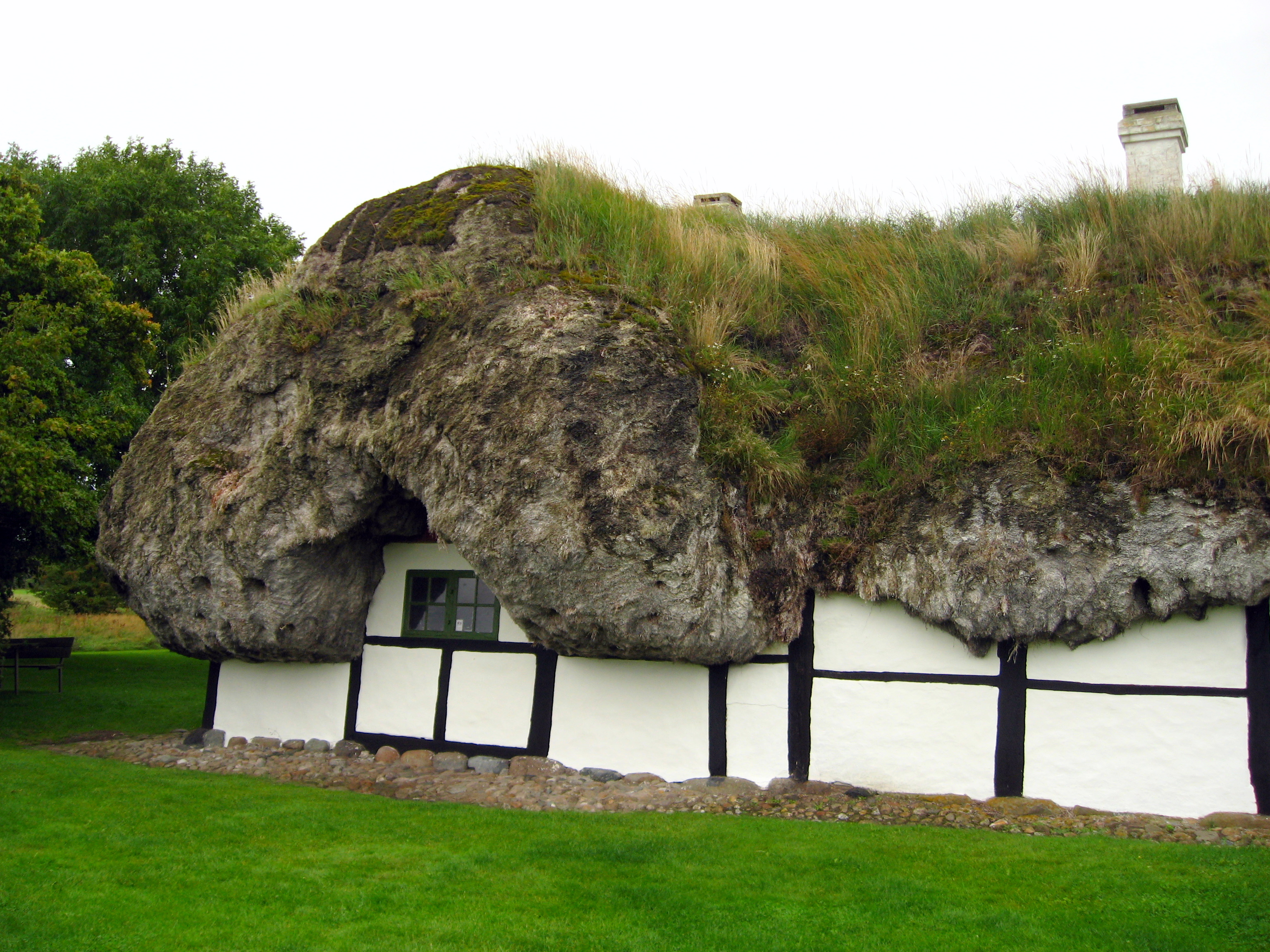
An example of traditional seaweed roofs on Læsø, Denmark

People have long used this plant species as roof thatching in some areas. On Læsø in Denmark, a tradition of using eelgrass as roof material is recognised by being included on the Tentative List of World Heritage Sites since 2023. It has been used as fertilizer and cattle fodder in Norway for centuries. It has also been dried and used as stuffing for mattresses and furniture. The Seri hunter gatherers of Mexico eat eelgrass grains after toasting them and grinding into a paste.

Ángel León, a Spanish chef, has planted meadows of Z. marina (described as "sea rice") in the Bay of Cádiz in order to harvest the grains. The texture is described as between rice and quinoa, but with a more saline flavour. It is gluten-free and high in fibre.
