= Seaweed roofs on Læsø =

Type of roofing of a Danish island

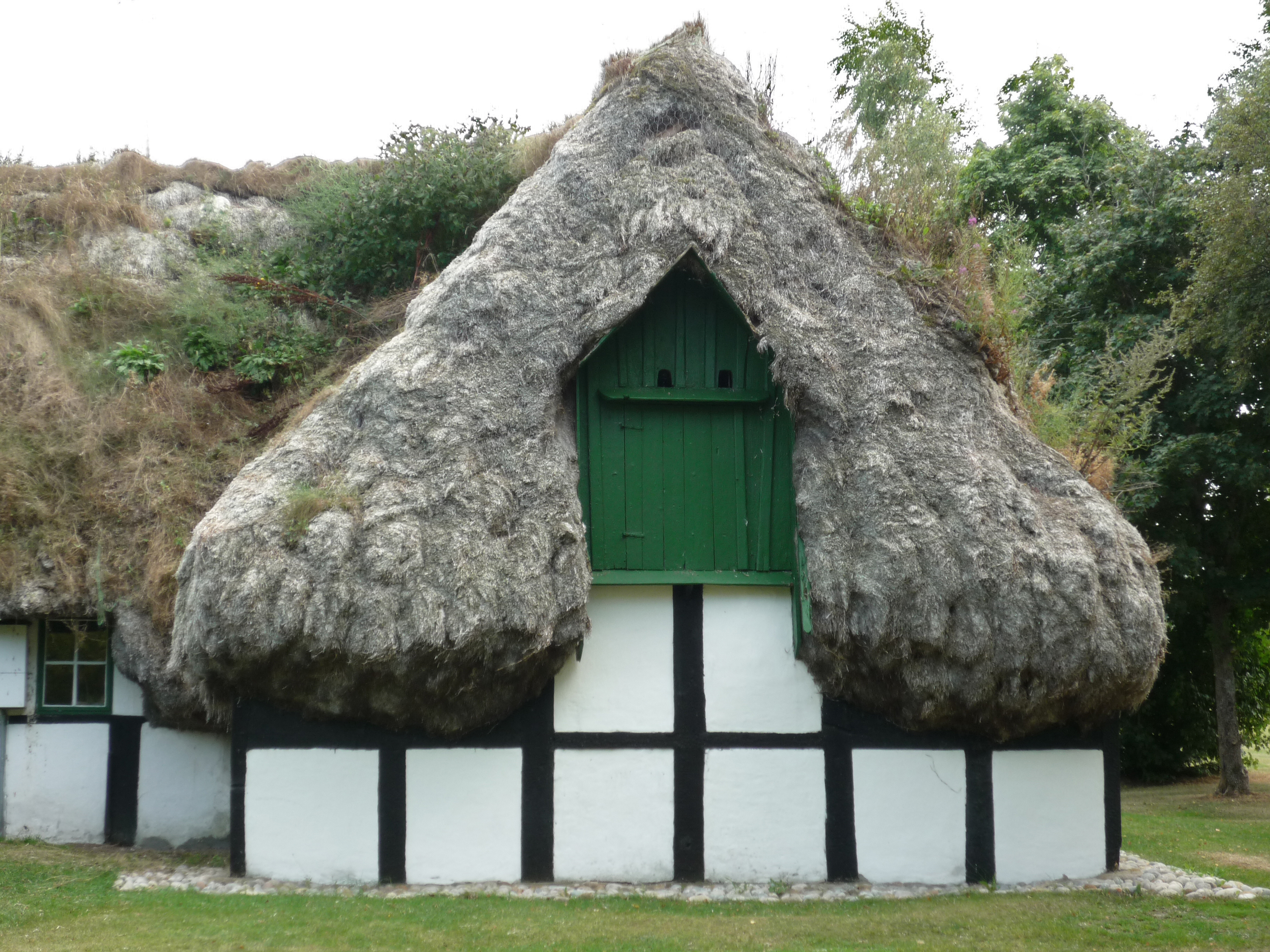
A house with a seaweed roof on Læsø

Seaweed roofs on Læsø (Danish: tangtage på Læsø) are roofs made of eelgrass on some houses, built with a type of vernacular building technique, on the Danish island of Læsø. The tradition goes back to the 17th century, and was prompted by local deforestation connected with salt production. The construction of seaweed roofs was traditionally done by women. The roofs can weigh 35–40 tonnes (34–39 long tons) and reach a thickness of 1.5 metres (4.9 ft). The roofs insulate well, are pest-, rot- and fire-resistant, and can withstand harsh weather. The seaweed roofs on Læsø are part of a World Heritage Site nomination which has been on the Tentative List of World Heritage Sites since 2023.

== History ==
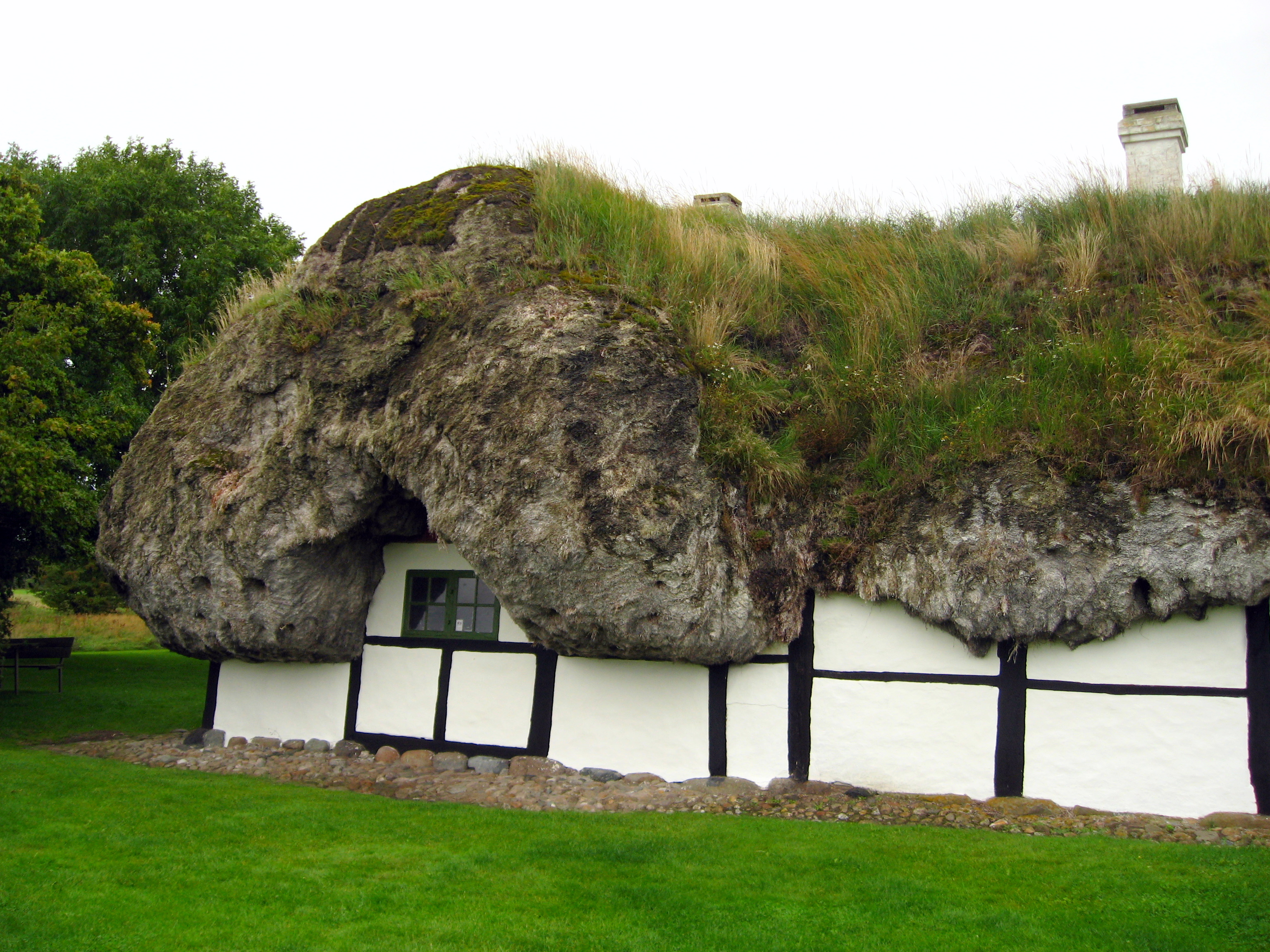
An example of a seaweed roof on Læsø, with its distinct, oversize gable

Læsø island has historically been associated with salt production, which in the 17th century led to widespread deforestation. Reeds, which are traditionally used in many other areas as thatching, were difficult to transport to the island, and straw was too valuable as fodder to be used. At the same time, an abundance of eelgrass washed up on the shores of Læsø and thus began to be used to build roofs. Surviving examples date as far back as the 1650s, and the last building to be built in this tradition dates from the 1870s. After this, new buildings were not built with seaweed roofs, but old buildings continue to be repaired using the traditional technique. While there were around 230 seaweed roof buildings on Læsø still in the 1930s, the number in 2014 was by one account 34. As part of a conservation project, a new house with seaweed roof was constructed on Læsø in 2012–2013. The seaweed houses of Læsø are part of a proposed inclusion of the cultural landscape related to the historical salt production on the island as a World Heritage Site, which is on the Tentative List of World Heritage Sites since 2023.

Traditionally the construction of seaweed roof houses was done by women, who also harvested the building material, while the men of the island, who were for long periods at sea as fishermen, would collect driftwood. Construction of such a house was a collective undertaking that could involve 40-50 or even up to 100 people.

Houses built with a similar technique have existed in Halland in Sweden, across the Kattegat from Læsø. No seaweed roofs remain there, however.

== Description ==
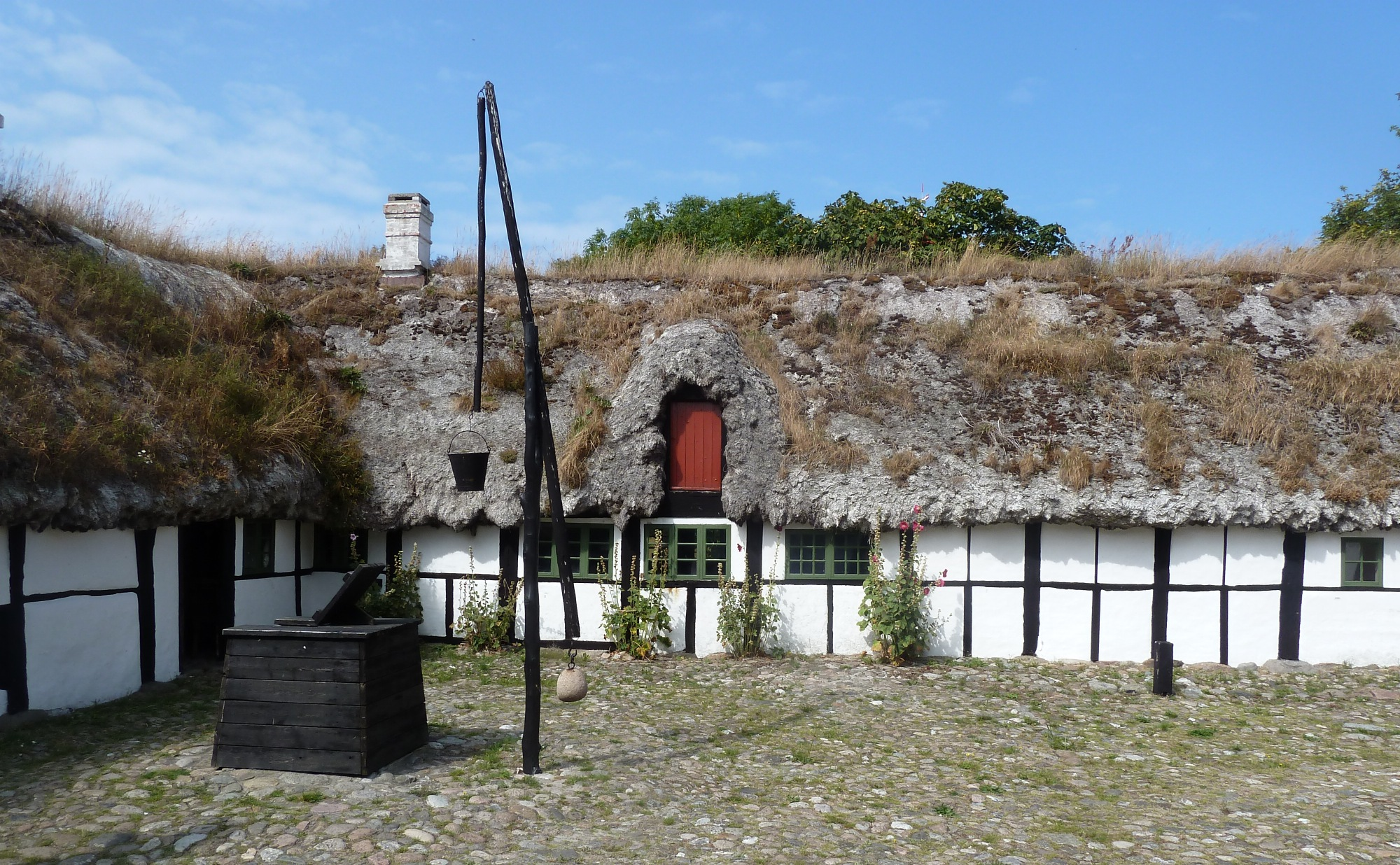
Museumsgården, one of two houses with seaweed roofs on Læsø that is open to visitors

Eelgrass is traditionally used as roofing material and cladding. Buildings with seaweed roofs have a characteristic look with overhanging eelgrass thatch and large gables. The roofs can weigh 35–40 tonnes (34–39 long tons). The seaweed was traditionally placed in layers directly on the roof beams, and could reach a thickness of 1.5 metres (4.9 ft). The material insulates well, and can withstand the occasionally harsh weather on the island, such as storms and rain. It is pest-, rot- and fire-resistant, and air permeable. Houses with seaweed roofs are said to be warm in winter and cool in summer. A "seaweed route" has been created on the island for tourists, who can also visit two such buildings. Most however remain in private ownership.
