= John Rock =

John Rock may refer to:

- John Rock (abolitionist) (1825–1866), American abolitionist
- John Rock (nurseryman) (1838–1904), owner of the California Nursery Company
- John Rock (physician) (1890–1984), co-inventor of the birth control pill
- John Rock, an alias of Danish singer Jon Nørgaard (born 1985)
- Johns Rock, a hazard to shipping in Danish Waters

== See also ==
- Rock (name)
