= Ángel León =

Ángel León may refer to:

- Ángel León (chef), Spanish chef
- Ángel León Gozalo, Spanish sport shooter
