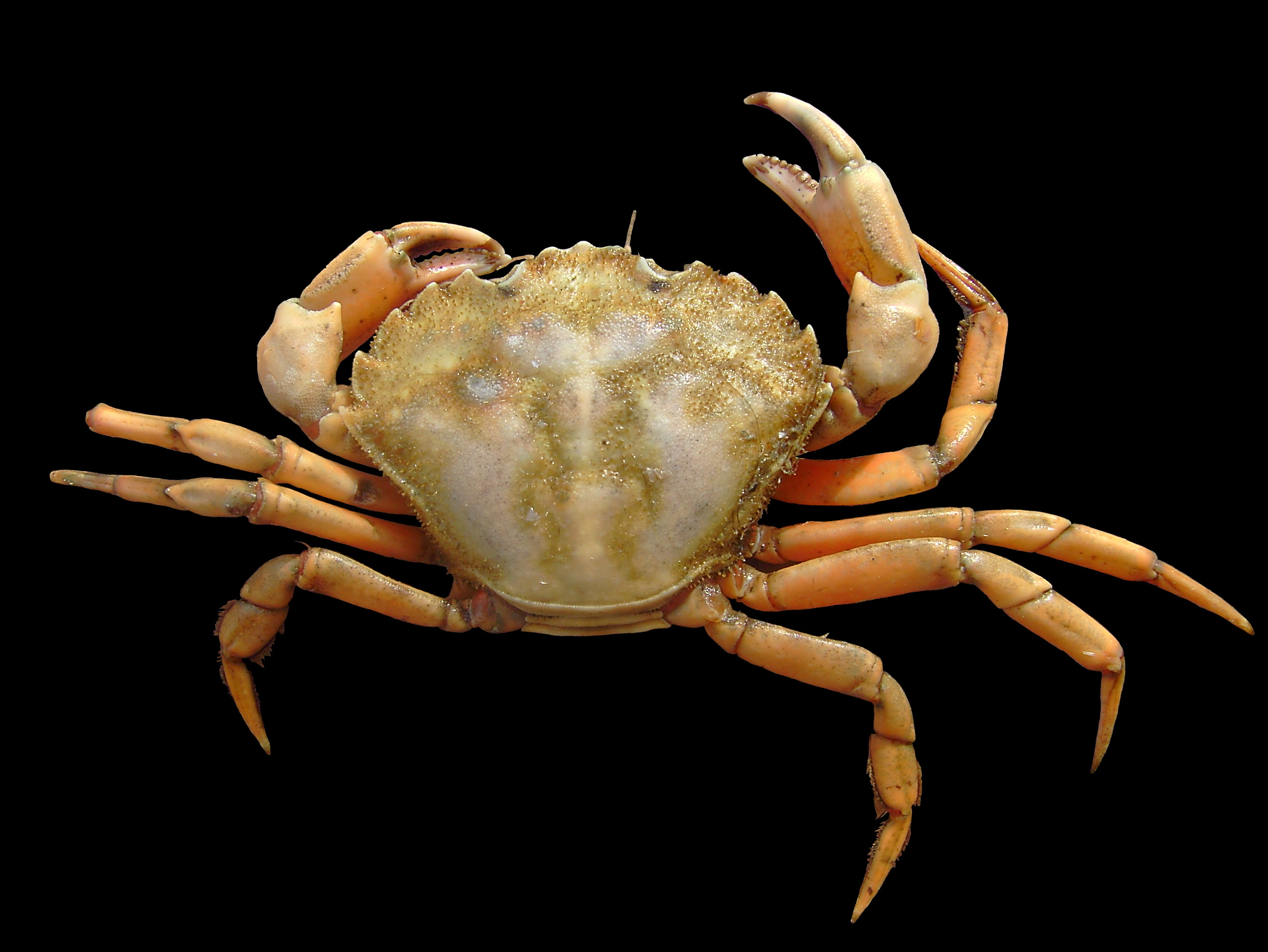
- Carcinus maenas

Scientific classification
- Domain: Eukaryota
- Kingdom: Animalia
- Phylum: Arthropoda
- Class: Malacostraca
- Order: Decapoda
- Suborder: Pleocyemata
- Infraorder: Brachyura
- Family: Carcinidae
- Subfamily: Carcininae
- Genus: Carcinus; Leach, 1814

Species
- Carcinus aestuarii Nardo, 1847; Carcinus maenas (Linnaeus, 1758)

= Carcinus =

Genus of crabs

Carcinus (Greek: Καρκίνος Karkinos) is a genus of crabs, which includes Carcinus maenas, an important invasive species, and C. aestuarii, a species endemic to the Mediterranean Sea.

== Carcinus maenas ==
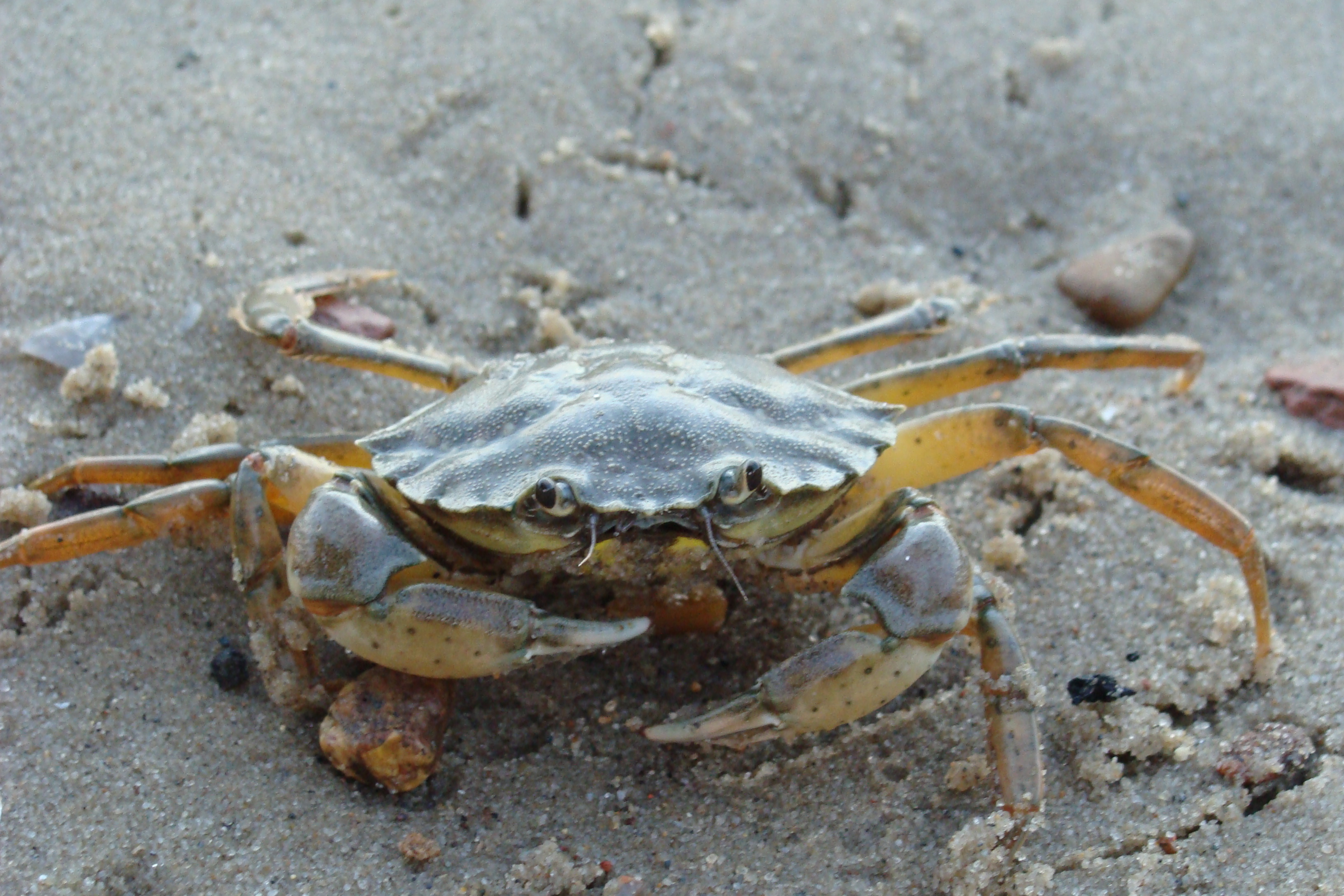
Carcinus maenas

C. maenas is among the 100 "world's worst alien invasive species". It is native to the northeast Atlantic Ocean and Baltic Sea, but has colonised similar habitats in Australia, South Africa, South America, and both Atlantic and Pacific Coasts of North America. It grows to a carapace width of 90 mm (3.5 in), and feeds on a variety of molluscs, worms, and small crustaceans, potentially impacting a number of fisheries. Its successful dispersion has occurred via a variety of mechanisms, such as on ships' hulls, packing materials, bivalves moved for aquaculture, and rafting.

C. maenas is known by different names around the world. In the British Isles, it is generally referred to simply as the shore crab. In North America and South Africa, it bears the name green crab or European green crab. In Australia and New Zealand, it is referred to as either the European green crab or European shore crab.

== C. aestuarii ==
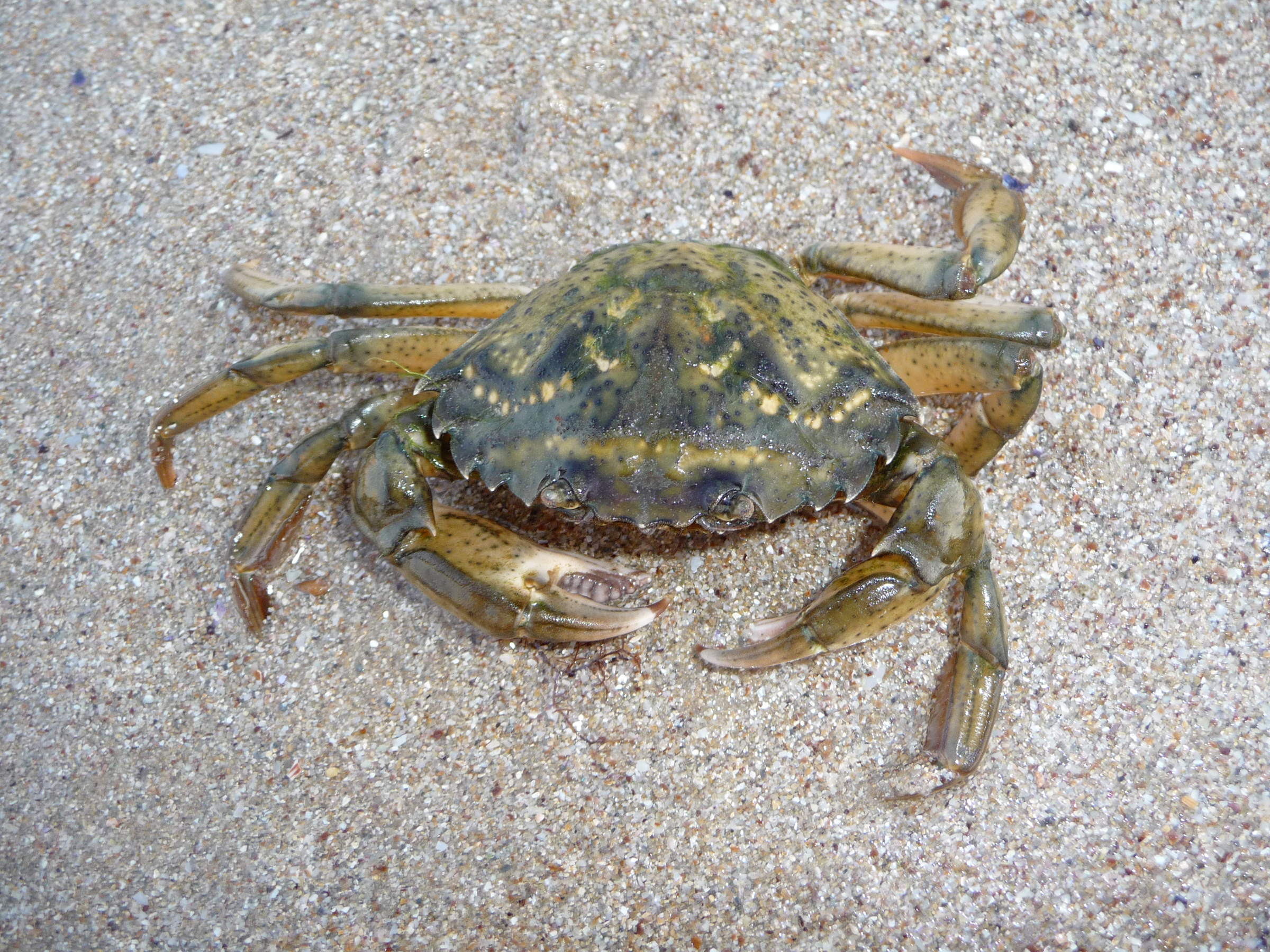
Carcinus aestuarii

C. aestuarii is a native to the Mediterranean Sea. It is very similar to C. maenas, and is sometimes considered to be a subspecies of C. maenas rather than a species in its own right. The two taxa can be distinguished by the front of the carapace, between the eyes, which is short and toothed in C. maenas, but longer and smoother in C. aestuarii. Unlike C. maenas, C. aestuarii has only been implicated in one invasion; the coastline of Japan has been invaded by either C. aestuarii or a hybrid of C. aestuarii and C. maenas.
