= Byrum, Denmark =

Main town on Læsø, Denmark

Coordinates: 57°15′N 10°59′E

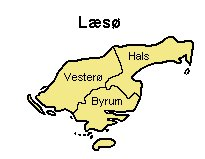
Location of Byrum in the South of Læsø

Byrum is the biggest town and municipal seat on the Danish island Læsø in Kattegat. The town is the only one on the island not located by the sea (except for Mejeriby). The town has a population of 425 (1 January 2026).

Byrum is located in North Denmark Region, Læsø Municipality.
