= Læsø =

Largest island in the Kattegat

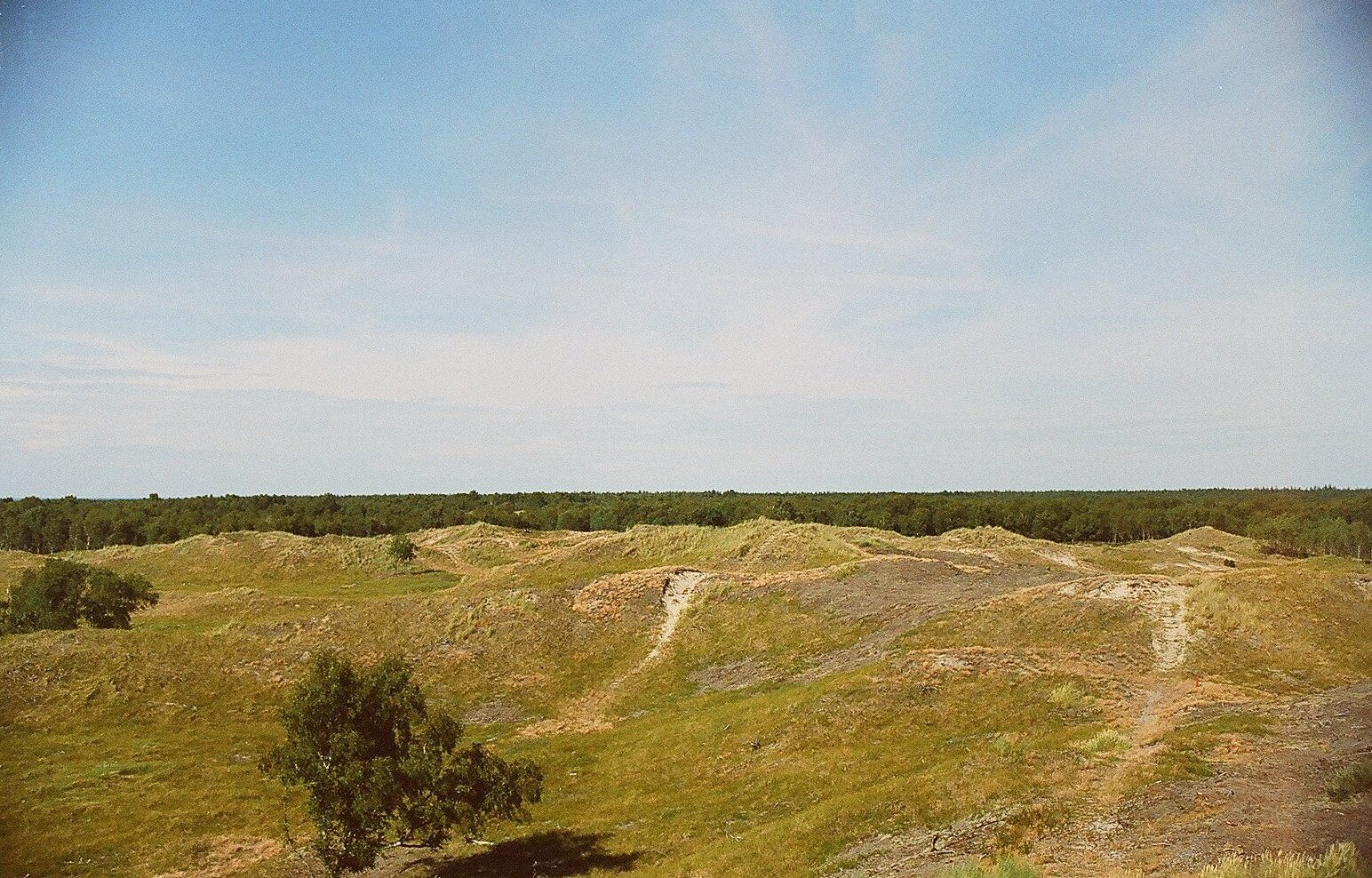
- Højsande, Læsø

- Location of Læsø in Denmark

Geography
- Location: Kattegat
- Coordinates: 57°15′36″N 11°00′00″E
- Area: 101 km^{2} (39 sq mi)

Administration
- Denmark
- Region: North Jutland Region
- Municipality: Læsø Municipality
- Largest settlement: Byrum (pop. 488)

Demographics
- Population: 1,683 (2026)
- Pop. density: 17.5/km^{2} (45.3/sq mi)

Ramsar Wetland
- Official name: Læso
- Designated: 2 September 1977
- Reference no.: 149

Læsø ("Isle of Hlér") is the largest island in the Kattegat, and is located 19 kilometres (12 mi) off the northeast coast of Jutland, the Danish mainland. Læsø Municipality is the municipality of Denmark (Danish: kommune) on the island. The island is a location mentioned in several instances in Old Norse sources detailing Norse mythology.

In a 2010 survey, readers of the Danish newspaper Kristeligt Dagblad voted Læsø as Denmark's second most wonderful island, behind only Fur.

== Name and Norse mythology ==
The modern Danish form of the island's name, læsø, developed from Old Norse Hlésey, meaning 'Hlér's island'. Hlér (Old Norse 'sea'), also known as Ægir (also Old Norse 'sea'), is a jötunn and personification of the sea in Norse mythology whose nine daughters personify waves. Similarly, the Danish city of Lejre may also derive from Hlér.

In the Poetic Edda poem Hárbarðsljóð, the god Thor comments that it was on Hlésey that he was attacked by (and so fought) "berserk women" or "brides of berserks" who had bewitched all of the men on the island. Thor details that, upon beaching his ship, the women battered it, threatened him with iron clubs and chased his servant, Þjálfi:

Benjamin Thorpe translation: She-wolves they were, and scarcely women. They crushed my ship, which with props I had secured, with iron clubs threatened me, and drove away Thiâlfi. What meanwhile didst thou, Harbard?	Henry Adams Bellows translation: She-wolves they were like, and women little; My ship, which well I had trimmed, did they shake; With clubs of iron they threatened, and Thjalfi they drove off. What, Harbarth, didst thou the while?

These "women" are personified waves and/or jötnar. The island is also a setting in the poems Helgakviða Hundingsbana II and Oddrúnargrátr, the saga Örvar-Odds saga, in two skaldic kennings, and the aforementioned (see etymology section above) Prose Edda book Skáldskaparmál.

== Municipality of Læsø ==
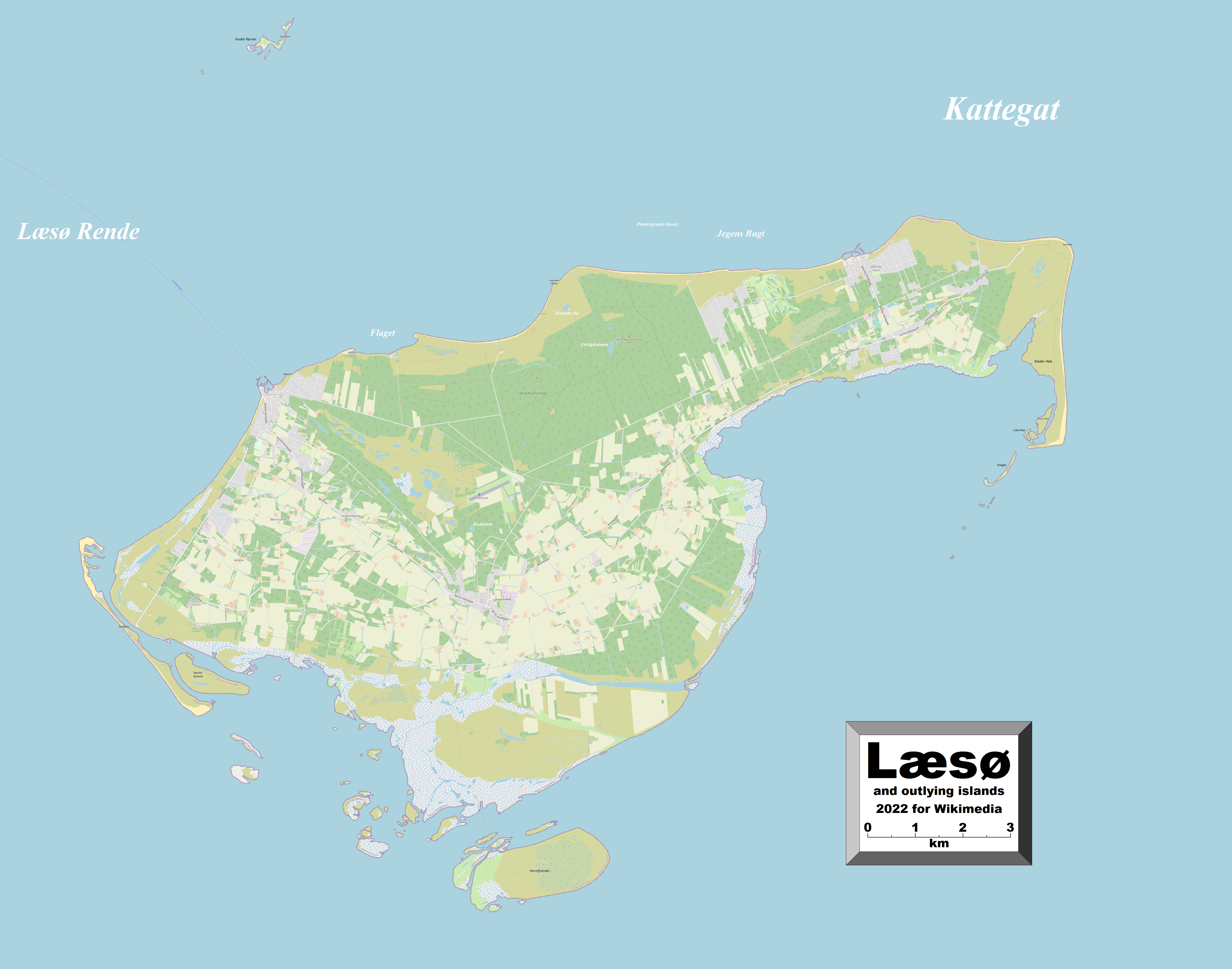
Detailed map of Læsø

The municipality is in the North Jutland Region in northern Denmark. The municipality, Denmark's least populous, covers Læsø and neighboring small islands for a total area of 114 square kilometres (44 sq mi), and has a total population of 1,683 as of 1. January 2026. The population has been steadily declining, and according to Danmarks Statistik (Statistikbanken.dk) was:

Historical Population
Year	Inhabitants
2006	2091
2007	2056
2008	2003
2009	1993
2010	1969
2011	1949
2012	1897
2013	1839
2014	1808
2015	1795
2016	1817
2017	1793

Its mayor is Karsten Nielsen as of 2021. He is a member of the Venstre political party.

The main town and the site of its municipal council is Byrum.

Because Læsø is an island and lies in the Kattegat, its neighboring municipality, Frederikshavn on the Jutland peninsula, is separated by water, the Læsø Rende, from the island municipality.

Ferry service connects Frederikshavn on the Jutland peninsula to the municipality at the town of Vesterø Havn while Østerby Havn is the island's fishing harbour.

Læsø Municipality was not merged with any adjacent municipality under the municipal reform of 2007, as it agreed to enter into a "municipal cooperation agreement" with Frederikshavn Municipality.

=== Municipal council ===
Læsø's municipal council consists of 9 members, elected every four years.

Below is the current council composition.

Below are the municipal councils elected between the enactment of the Municipal Reform of 2007 and the 2025 Danish local elections.

Election	Party									Total seats	Turnout	Elected mayor
Election	A	C	D	D	F	H	L	O	V	Total seats	Turnout	Elected mayor
2005	2					2	2		3	9	78.5%	Olav Juul Gaarn Larsen (V)
2009	2				1	1	4		2	9	81.8%	Thomas W. Olsen (L)
2013	2		1			1	2	1	2	9	83.7%	Tobias B. Johansen (L)
2017	1						2	2	4	9	82.3%	Karsten Nielsen (O)
2021	1	2		0			2	1	3	9	67.8%	Tobias Birch Johansen (V)
Data from Kmdvalg.dk 2005, 2009, 2013, 2017. DR: 2021

== Nature and protections ==
Læsø has an outstanding botanical interest. The nature-types on and around Læsø includes open water, extensive mudflats, sand banks, heathland, islets and areas of arable land. It houses Denmark's largest tidal saltmarsh outside the Wadden Sea but the decline in grazing animals has led to a gradual vegetational succession. Invasive species are colonizing the site, especially Japanese Rose, and scrub clearance has been implemented to re-establish the former pastures open heathland. Seals like the Harbor seal are breeding around Læsø and the whole area is an internationally important area for wintering, molting and staging waterbirds. Therefore, a Ramsar protection was put into force in 1977 (number 149) and today it encompass 66,548 ha (257 sq. mi.).

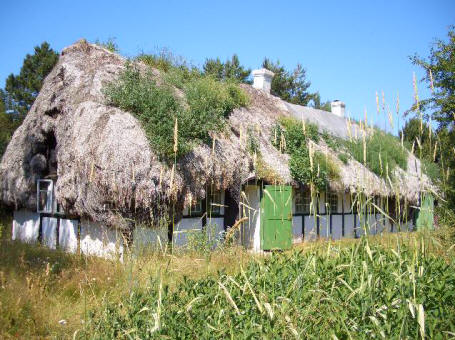
A particular feature of Læsø is its seaweed roofs: half-timbered houses thatched with eelgrass

== Climate, industry, and wildlife ==
Together with Anholt, Læsø belongs to the Danish "desert belt"; during the summer months there is so little rain that streams and ponds partly dry up.

In the Middle Ages, the island was known for its salt industry. The ground water can reach over 15 percent salt, and this was naturally concentrated in flat salt meadows during the hot dry summers. The final concentration, carried out in hundreds of salt kilns, consumed large amounts of wood. Eventually the island became deforested, sandstorms buried villages, and salt extraction was banned. Since the end of the 1980s it has been resumed on a small scale as an archaeological experiment and a tourist attraction. The traditional seaweed roofs on Læsø were constructed from the 17th century onwards, as a result of a lack of roofing material due to the salt industry; instead, the inhabitants started using eelgrass to cover their buildings. The cultural landscape, including the seaweed roofs, is recognised by being included on the Tentative List of World Heritage Sites since 2023.

Læsø is home to unique styles of Danish traditional music. Most of it is not played any more but has been preserved through intense documentation and research in the 1980s and 1990s.

The HVDC powerline Kontiskan crosses Læsø as overhead line. On Læsø, there is also a 160 metres (525 feet) tall radio relay mast.

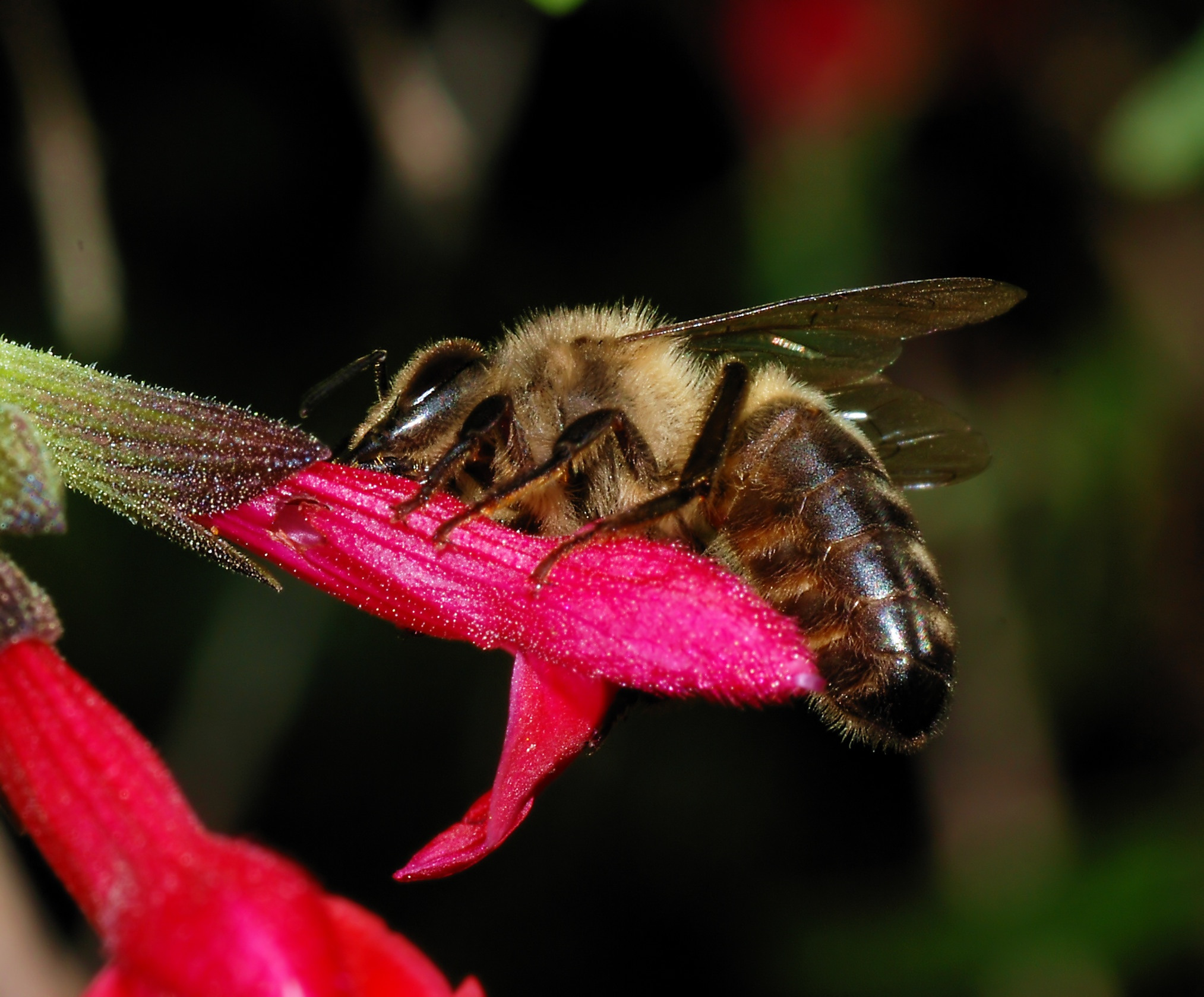
Apis mellifera mellifera

In 1993, a conservation area was established for the A. m. mellifera, nicknamed the Brown Bee of Læsø, where it became illegal according to Danish Law to keep and import any other type of bee other than Apis mellifera mellifera. This was met with protests and a legal battle lasting eight years from other beekeepers of A. m. ligustica, A. m. carnica and Buckfast bees, as they did not "want to become a custodian of poor bees". They also stated that A. m. mellifera was "unproductive" and "not worthy of protection". They lost their case in 2001, and negotiations between A. m. mellifera beekeepers and non–A. m. mellifera beekeepers were concluded in 2004, splitting the island in two between them, ending a "history of sabotage of bees" on the island. The A. m. mellifera supporters claimed that they had "introduced apartheid on Læsø for the bees".

== Notable residents ==
- Gustav S. Christensen (1929–2007) an academic mathematician and engineer.
- Mogens Bay Esbensen (born 1930), a prominent Danish born chef and author, has lived there since 1992.
- Per Kirkeby (1938–2018), a Danish painter, poet, film maker and sculptor, owned a house and studio on the island.

== Gallery ==
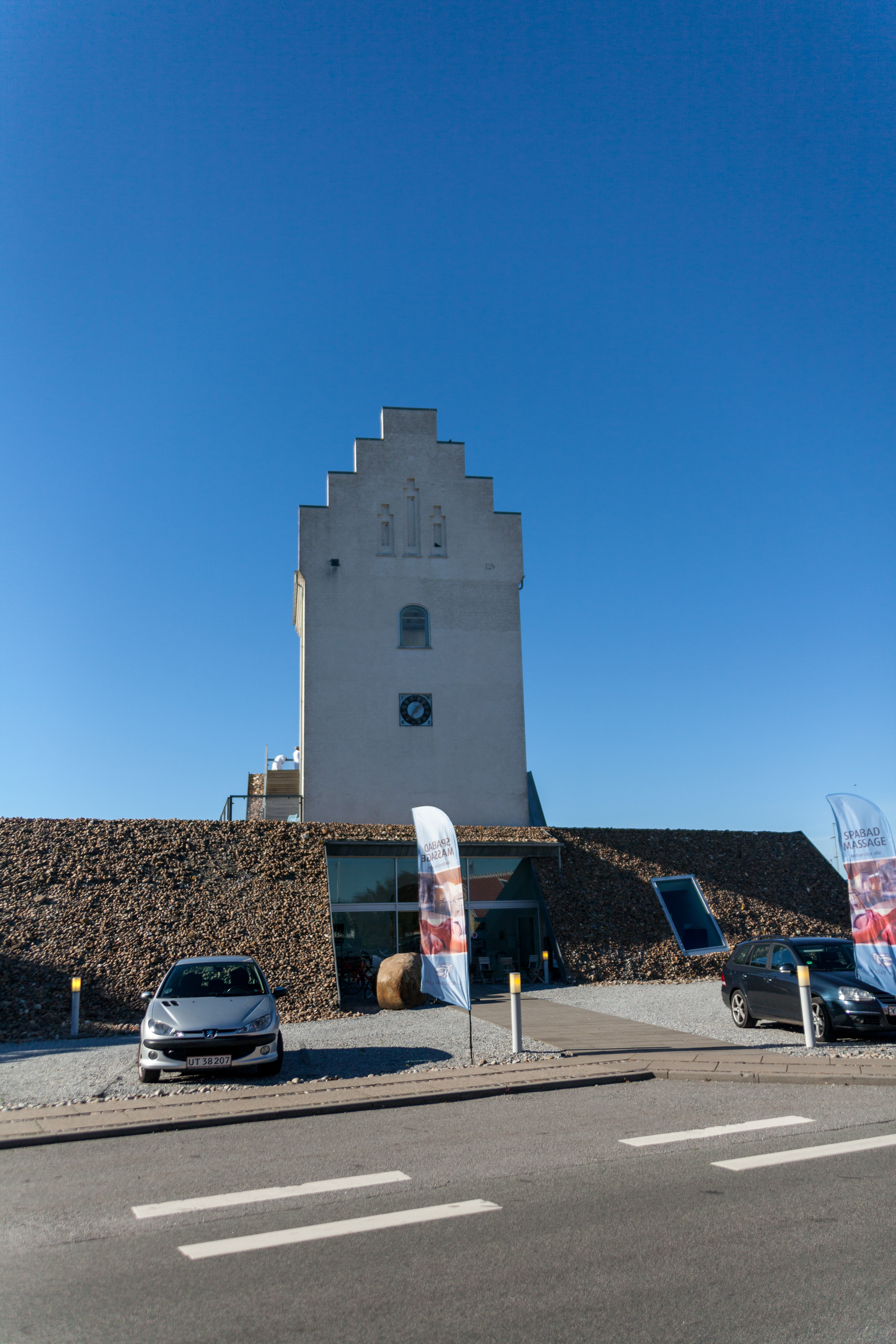
Læsø kur

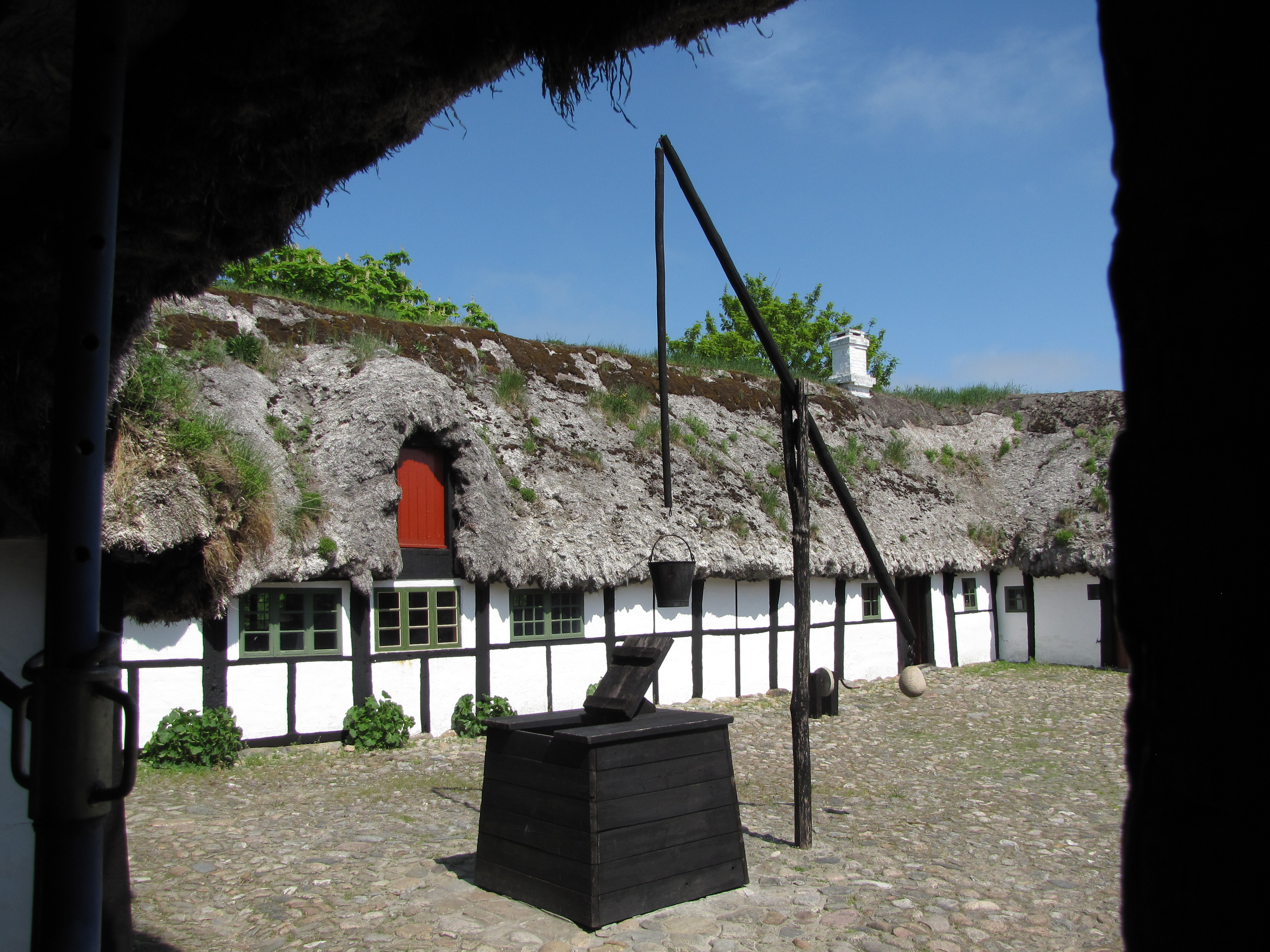
Museumsgården

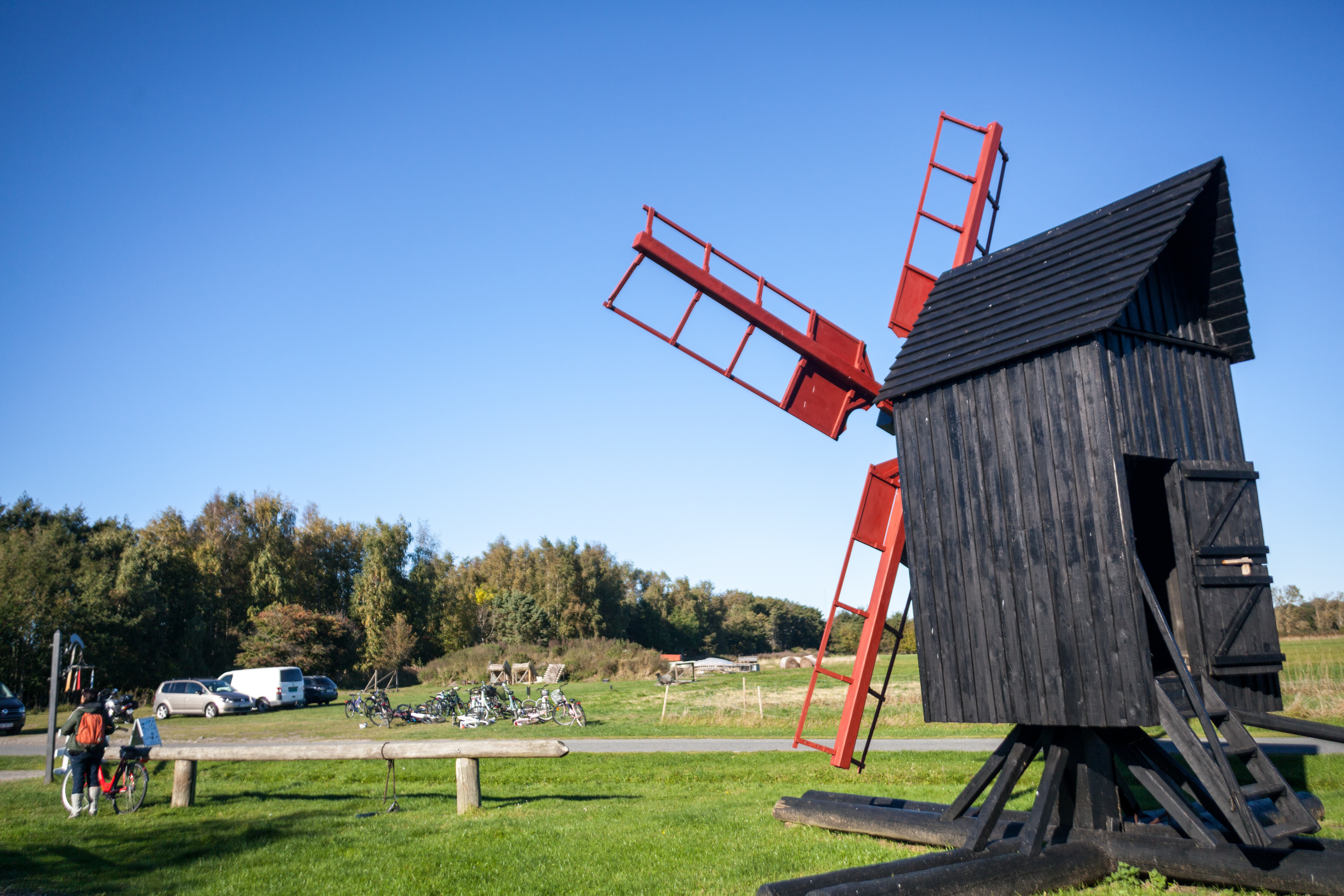
Læsø

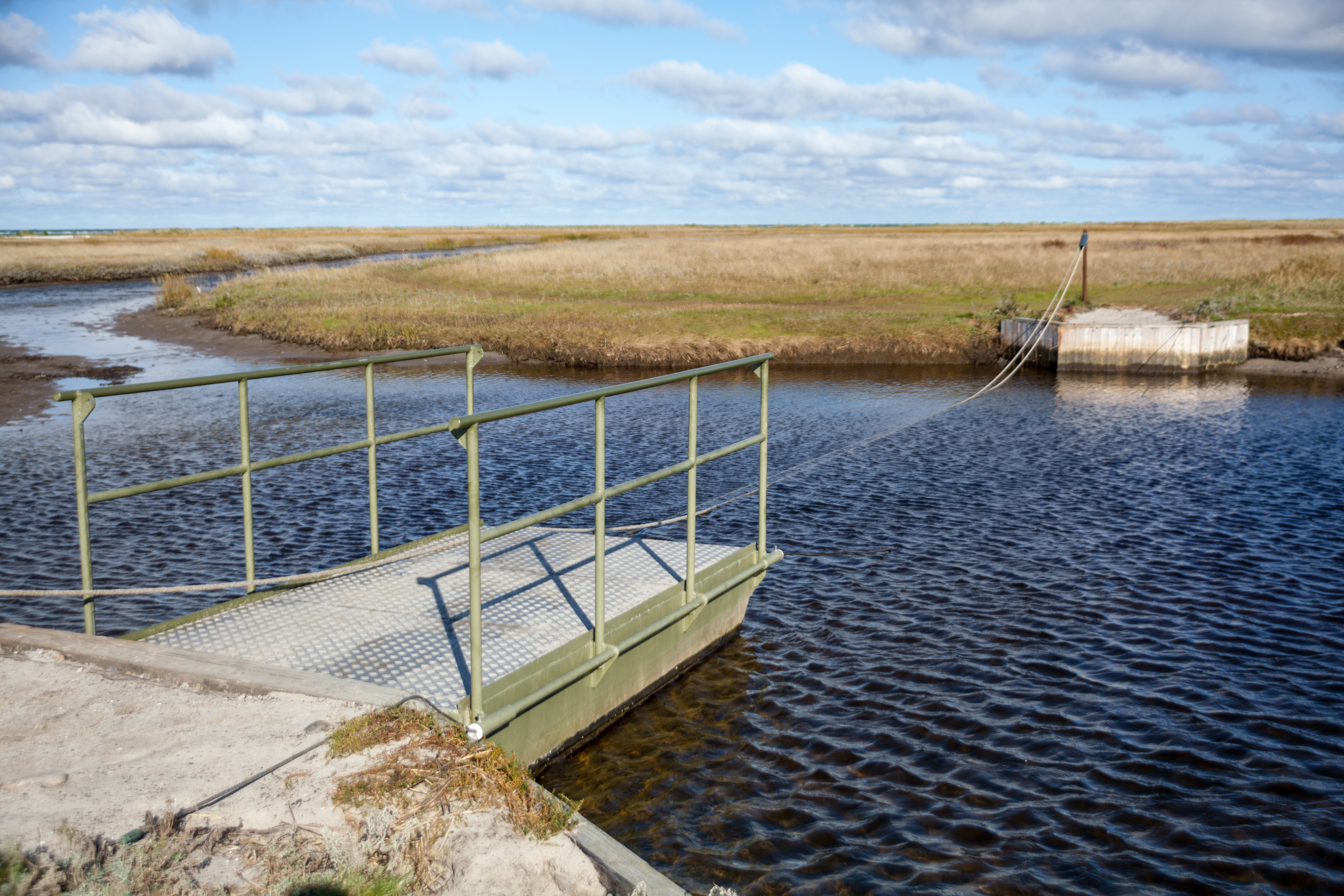
Fannemandsfærgen

== See also ==
- Johns Rock
- List of islands of Denmark
