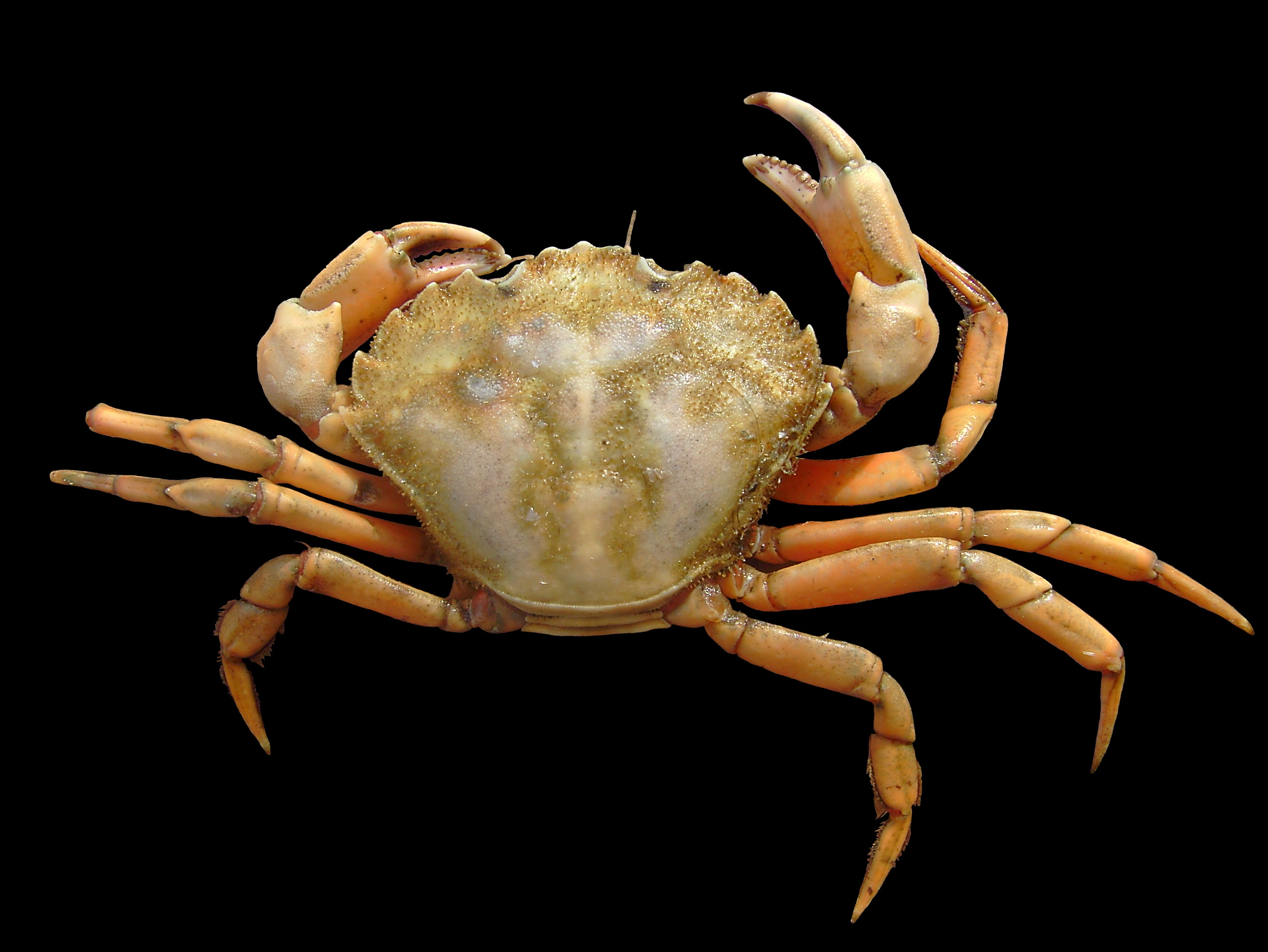

Scientific classification
- Kingdom: Animalia
- Phylum: Arthropoda
- Clade: Pancrustacea
- Class: Malacostraca
- Order: Decapoda
- Suborder: Pleocyemata
- Infraorder: Brachyura
- Family: Carcinidae
- Genus: Carcinus
- Species: C. maenas

Binomial name
- Carcinus maenas (Linnaeus, 1758)

= Carcinus maenas =

Species of invasive crab

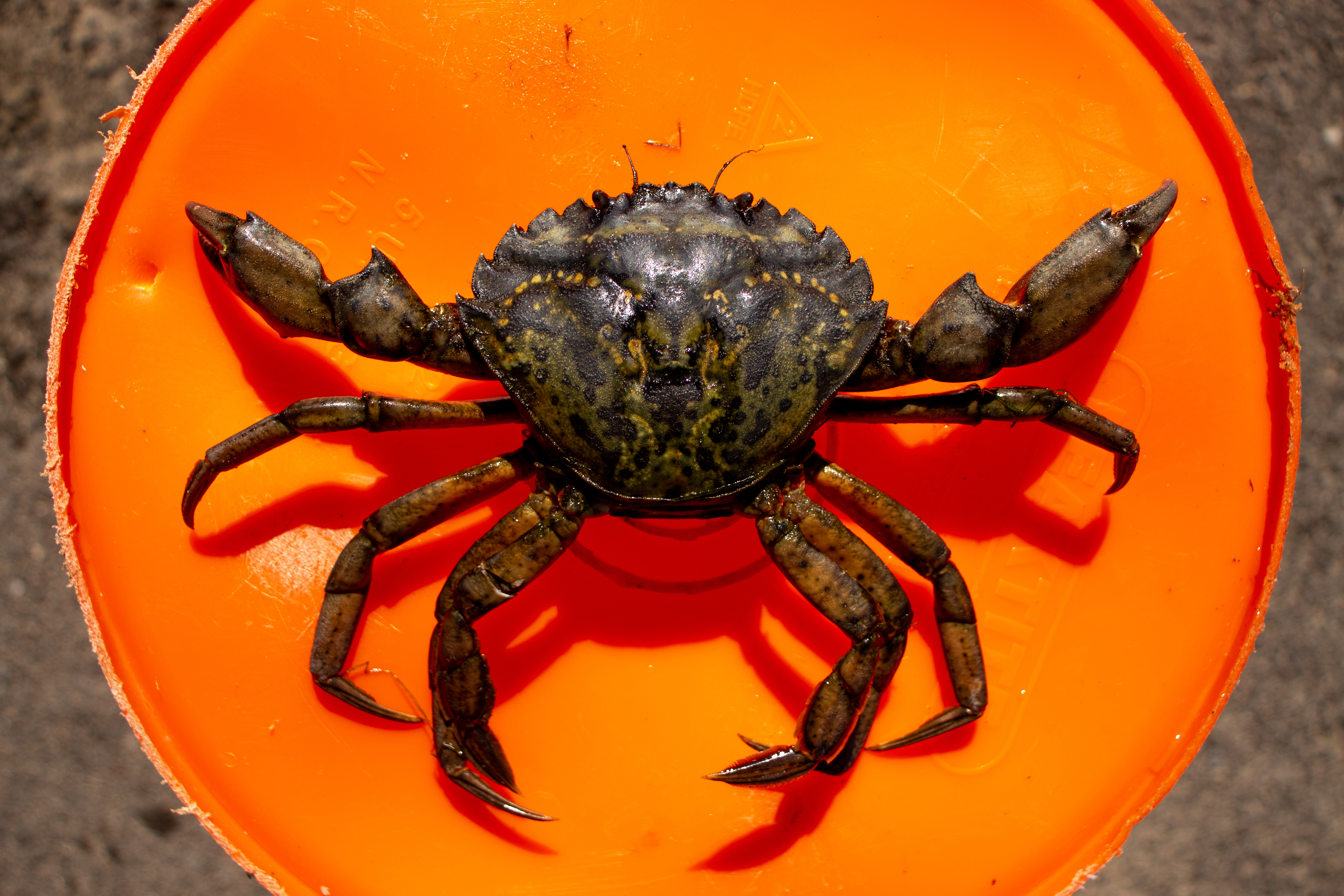
A large male C. maenas, on top of a 5-gallon bucket for scale

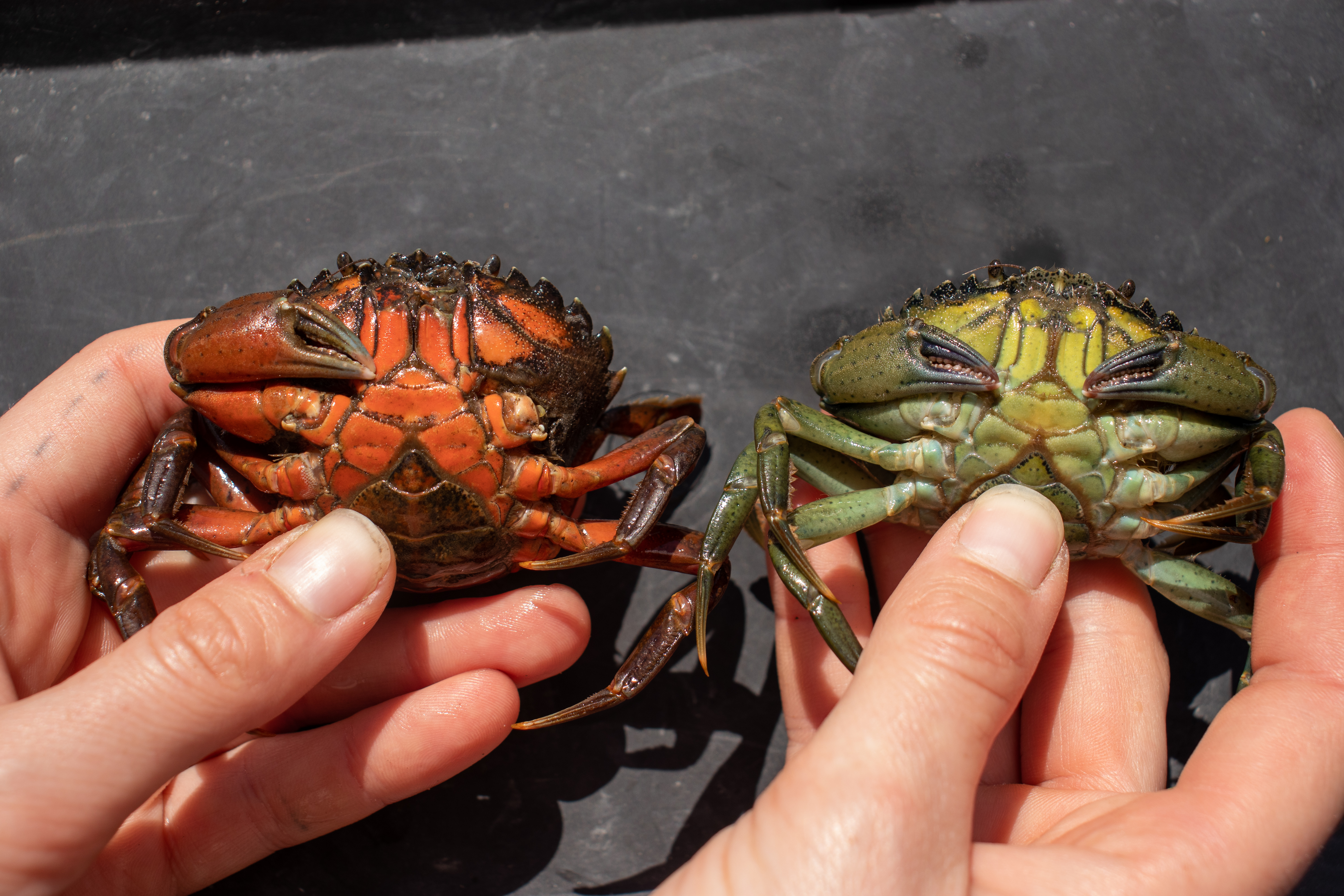
Two female C. maenas: Despite the possibly misleading common name, European green crabs are not only green. The underside of their carapace can range from green to yellow to orange to red. The best way to identify them is through other characteristics, such as the five spines on either side of their eyes, with three in between them.

Carcinus maenas is a common littoral crab. It is known by different names around the world. In the British Isles, it is generally referred to as the shore crab or green shore crab. In North America and South Africa, it bears the name European green crab. The European Green Crab is native to Europe and North Africa.

Carcinus maenas is a widespread invasive species, listed among the 100 of the World's Worst Invasive Alien Species. It is native to the north-east Atlantic Ocean and Baltic Sea, but has colonised similar habitats in Australia, South Africa, South America, and both Atlantic and Pacific Coasts of North America. It grows to a carapace width of 90 mm (3 1/2 in), and feeds on a variety of mollusks, worms, and small crustaceans, affecting a number of fisheries. Its successful dispersal has occurred by a variety of mechanisms, such as on ships' hulls, sea planes, packing materials, and bivalves moved for aquaculture.

== Description ==
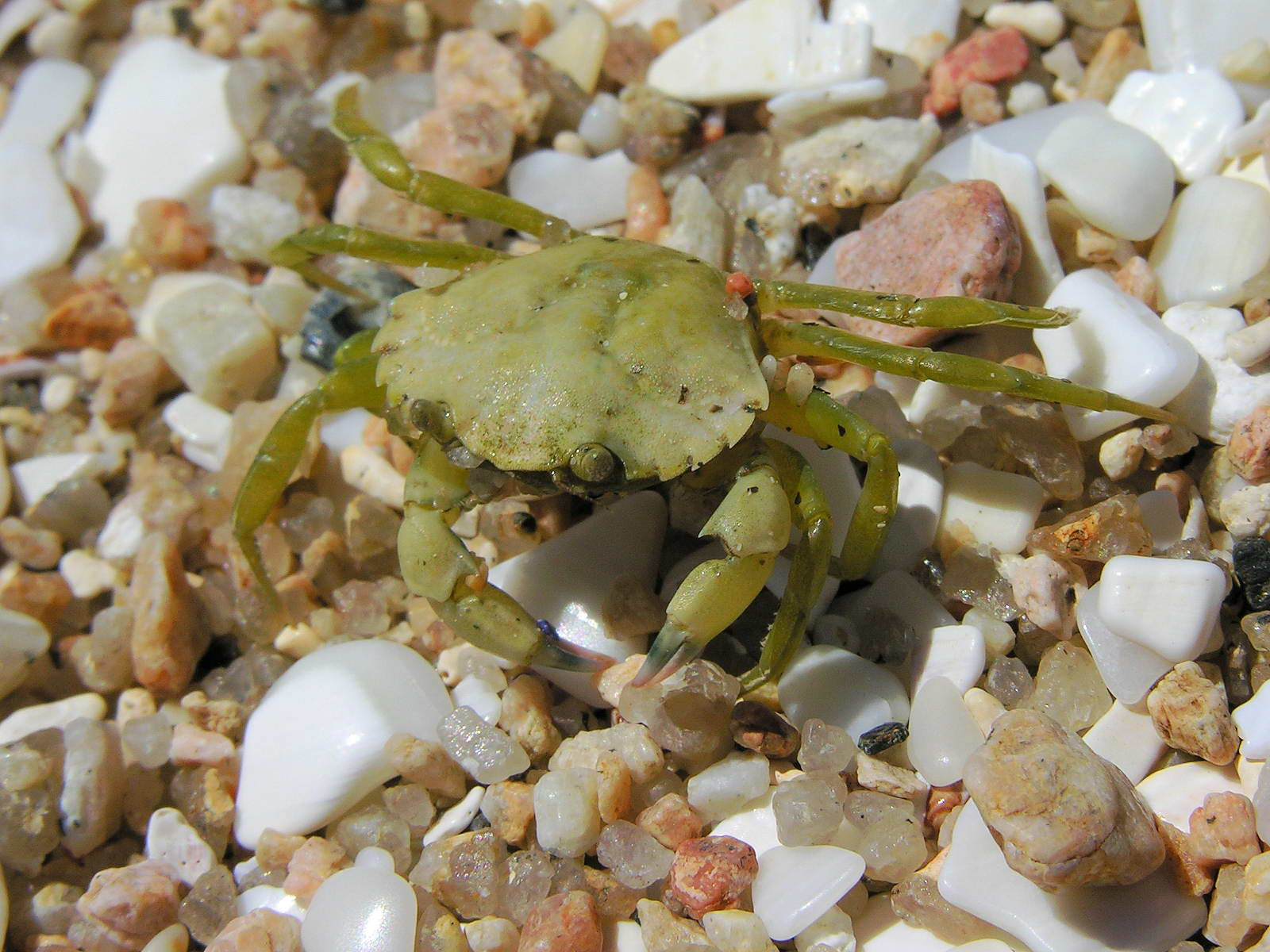
A juvenile C. maenas showing the common green colour

Carcinus maenas has a carapace up to 60 mm (2.4 in) long and 90 mm (3.5 in) wide, but can be larger outside its native range, reaching 100 mm (3.9 in) wide in British Columbia. The carapace has five short teeth along the rim behind each eye, and three undulations between the eyes. The undulations, which protrude beyond the eyes, are the simplest means of distinguishing C. maenas from the closely related C. aestuarii, which can also be an invasive species. In C. aestuarii, the carapace lacks any bumps and extends forward beyond the eyes. Another characteristic for distinguishing the two species is the form of the first and second pleopods (collectively the gonopods), which are straight and parallel in C. aestuarii, but curve outwards in C. maenas.

The colour of C. maenas varies greatly, from green to brown, grey, or red. This variation has a genetic component, but is largely due to local environmental factors. In particular, individuals which delay moulting become red-coloured rather than green. Red individuals are stronger and more aggressive, but are less tolerant of environmental stresses, such as low salinity or hypoxia. Juvenile crabs on average display greater patterning than adults.

== Native and introduced range ==
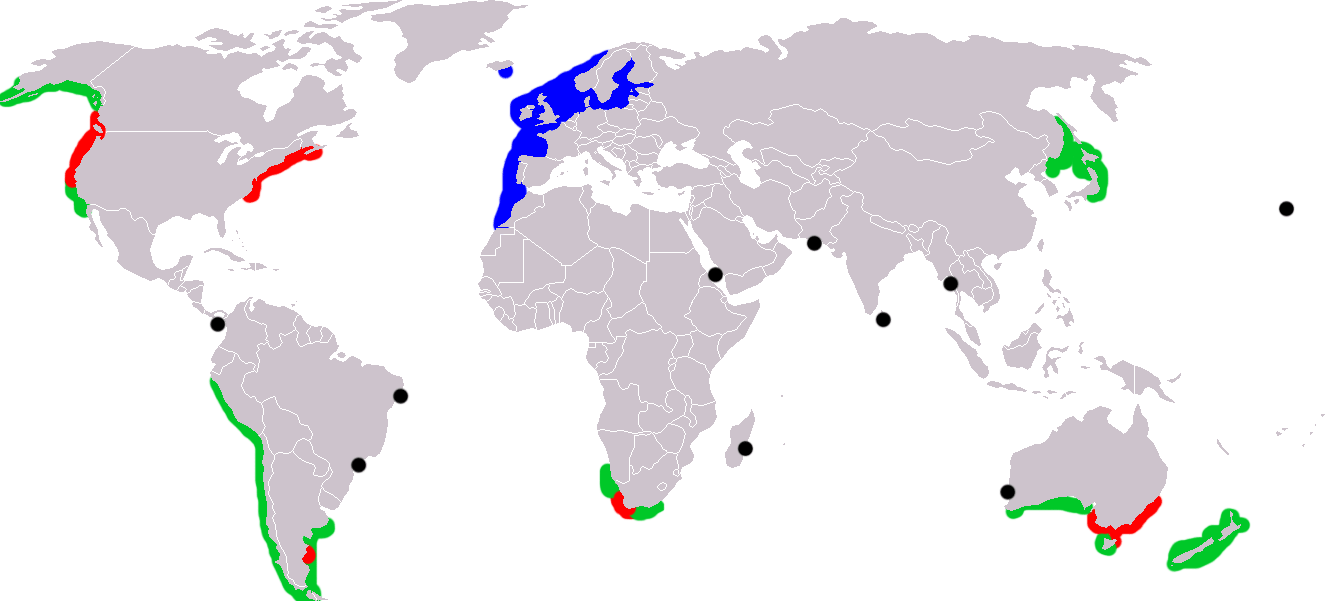
Approximate distribution of C. maenas (blue) native range● single sightings which did not result in an invasion (red) introduced or invasive range (green) potential invasive range

Carcinus maenas is native to European and North African coasts as far as the Baltic Sea in the east, and Iceland and Central Norway in the north, and is one of the most common crabs throughout much of its range. In the Mediterranean Sea, it is replaced by the closely related Mediterranean green crab species C. aestuarii.

Carcinus maenas was first observed on the east coast of North America in Massachusetts in 1817, and may now be found from South Carolina northwards; by 2007, this species had extended its range northwards to Maine and Placentia Bay, Newfoundland. In 1989, the species was found in San Francisco Bay, California, on the Pacific Coast of the United States. The green crab did not begin to expand its range until 1993, before rapidly expanding northward, reaching Oregon in 1997, Washington in 1998, and British Columbia in 1999, extending its total range by 750 km (470 mi) in 10 years. Invasive green crabs were first discovered in Alaska in 2022 by Metlakatla Indian Community Department of Fish and Wildlife. By 2003, C. maenas had extended to South America with specimens discovered in Patagonia.

In Australia, C. maenas was first reported "in the late 1800s" in Port Phillip Bay, Victoria, although the species was probably introduced as early as the 1850s. It has since spread along the southeastern and southwestern seaboards, reaching New South Wales in 1971, South Australia in 1976 and Tasmania in 1993. One specimen was found in Western Australia in 1965, but no further discoveries have been reported in the area since.

Carcinus maenas first reached South Africa in 1983, in the Table Docks area near Cape Town. Since then, it has spread at least as far as Saldanha Bay in the north and Camps Bay in the south, over 100 km (62 mi) apart.

Appearances of C. maenas have been recorded in Brazil, Panama, Hawaii, Madagascar, the Red Sea, Pakistan, Sri Lanka, and Myanmar; however, these have not resulted in invasions, but remain isolated findings. Japan has been invaded by a related crab, either Carcinus aestuarii or a hybrid of C. aestuarii and C. maenas.

Based on the ecological conditions, C. maenas could eventually extend its range to colonise the Pacific Coast of North America from Baja California to Alaska. Similar ecological conditions are to be found on many of the world's coasts, with the only large potential area not to have been invaded yet being New Zealand; the New Zealand government has taken action, including the release of a Marine Pest Guide in an effort to prevent colonisation by C. maenas.

In 2019, C. maenas was first found in Lummi Bay, Lummi Indian Reservation, Whatcom County, Washington, United States. The Lummi Nation began trapping and removing the crabs in an effort to get rid of them. Then in 2020, hundreds were found in traps, and more intensive trapping clearly will be necessary to keep their numbers down. Eradication will not be possible.

Over a 19-year study concluding in 2020, Oregon's Coos Bay was found to have an established and increasing population.

While in 2020, fewer than 3,000 were trapped, more than 79,000 were caught in 2021. This led the Lummi Indian Business Council to declare a disaster in November 2021 and the Washington Department of Fish and Wildlife to request emergency funding from the governor.

In 2025, the complete genome of Carcinus maenas was sequenced, providing a valuable foundation for investigating the genetic factors that contribute to this crab's global invasion success.

== Ecology ==
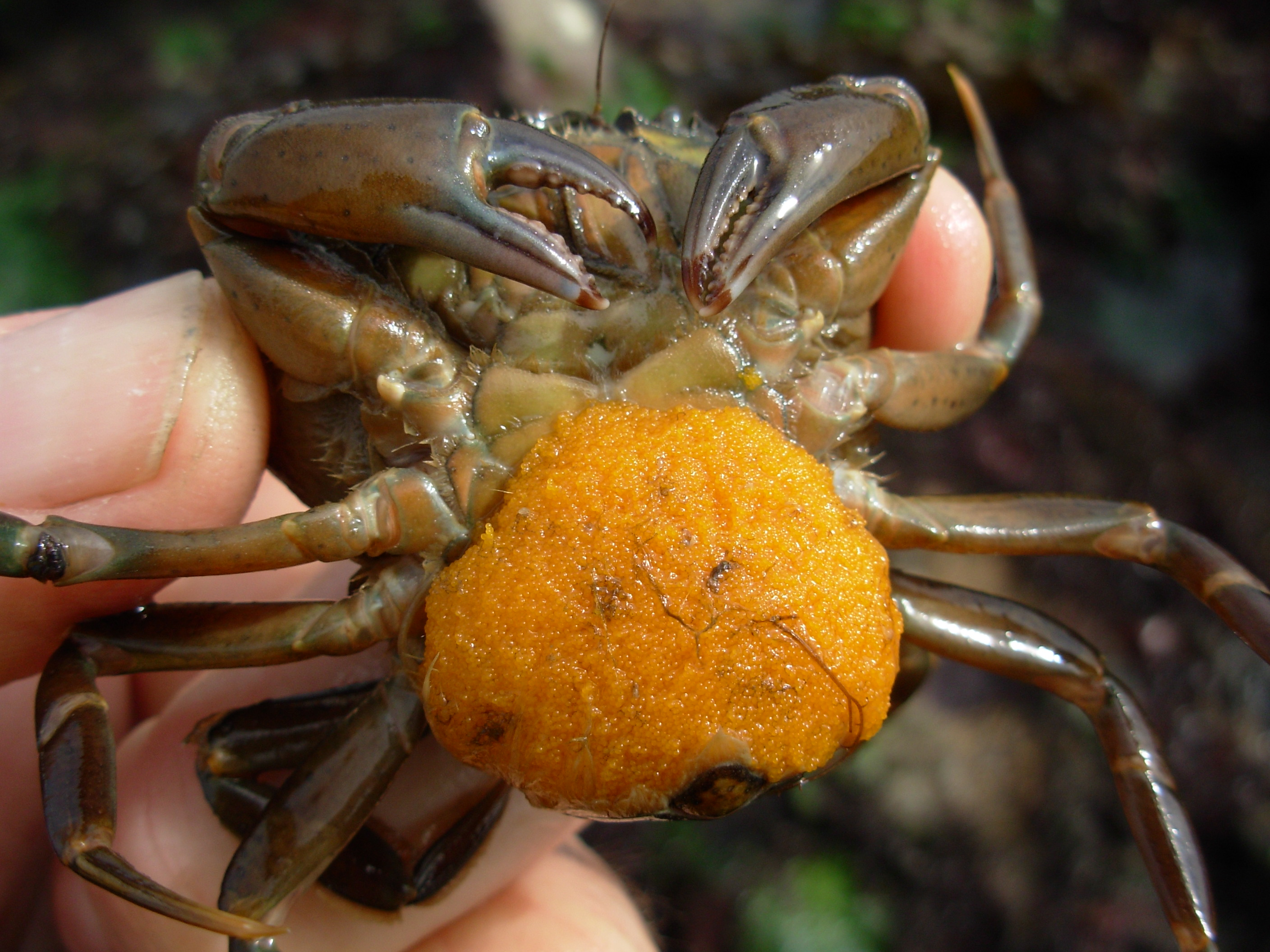
A female C. maenas carrying fertilised eggs

Carcinus maenas can live in all types of protected and semiprotected marine and estuarine habitats, including those with mud, sand, or rock substrates, submerged aquatic vegetation, and emergent marsh, although soft bottoms are preferred. Adult specimens of C. maenas are euryhaline, meaning they can tolerate a wide range in salinity (from 4 to 52 ‰), and survive in temperatures of 0 to 30 °C (32 to 86 °F). The wide salinity range allows C. maenas to survive in the lower salinities found in estuaries, and the wide temperature range allows it to survive in extremely cold climates beneath the ice in winter. Early life stages are more constrained in their tolerances; for example, larvae survive from hatch to metamorphosis to megalopa at temperatures between 12 and 27 °C. A molecular biological study using the COI gene found genetic differentiation between the North Sea and the Bay of Biscay, and even more strongly between the populations in Iceland and the Faroe Islands vs. those elsewhere. This suggests that C. maenas is unable to cross deeper water. Different native populations of C. maenas differ in traits such as larval and adult thermal tolerance, larval salinity tolerance, and body mass at hatching and at metamorphosis.

Females can produce more than 400,000 eggs, and larvae develop offshore in several stages before their final moult to juvenile crabs in the intertidal zone. Young crabs live among seaweeds and seagrasses, such as Posidonia oceanica, until they reach adulthood.

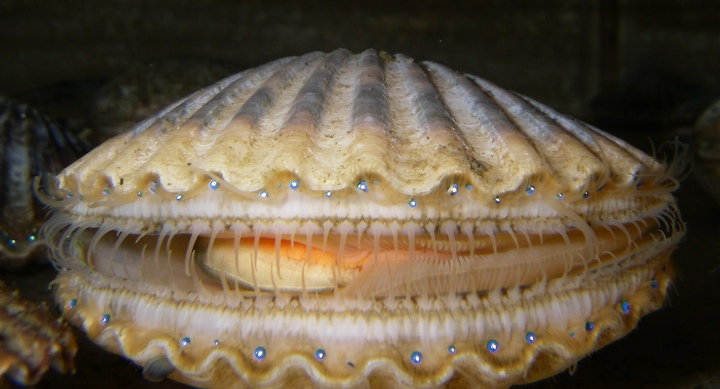
Argopecten irradians, a scallop that has been affected by the introduction of C. maenas

Carcinus maenas has the ability to disperse by a variety of mechanisms, including ballast water, ships' hulls, packing materials (seaweed) used to ship live marine organisms, bivalves moved for aquaculture, rafting, migration of crab larvae on ocean currents, and the movement of submerged aquatic vegetation for coastal zone management initiatives. C. maenas dispersed in Australia mainly by rare long-distance events, possibly caused by human actions.

Carcinus maenas is a predator, feeding on many organisms, particularly bivalve molluscs (such as clams – up to 40 1/2 inch (13 mm) clams per day, oysters, and mussels), polychaetes, and small crustaceans – including other crabs up to their own size. They are primarily diurnal, although activity also depends on the tide, and crabs can be active at any time of day. In California, preferential predation of C. maenas on native clams (Nutricola spp.) resulted in the decline of the native clams and an increase of a previously introduced clam (the amethyst gem clam, Gemma gemma), although C. maenas also voraciously preys on introduced clams such as Potamocorbula amurensis. The soft-shell clam (Mya arenaria) is a preferred prey species of C. maenas. Consequently, it has been implicated in the destruction of the soft-shell clam fisheries on the east coast of the United States and Canada, and the reduction of populations of other commercially important bivalves (such as scallops, Argopecten irradians, and northern quahogs, Mercenaria mercenaria). The prey of C. maenas includes the young of bivalves and fish, although the effect of its predation on winter flounder, Pseudopleuronectes americanus is minimal. C. maenas can, however, have substantial negative impacts on local commercial and recreational fisheries, by preying on the young of species, such as oysters (adults' shells are too tough for C. maenas to crack) and the Dungeness crab, or competing with them for resources and eating the Zostera marina that Dungeness and juvenile salmon depend upon for habitat. In seagrass systems, C. maenas can also consume Zostera marina seeds, and experimental work has suggested that this seed predation may reduce eelgrass recovery after meadow loss. Colder water temperatures reduce overall feeding rates of C. maenas.

To protect itself against predators, C. maenas uses different camouflage strategies depending on its habitat; crabs in mudflats try to resemble their surroundings with colours similar to the mud, while crabs in rock pools use disruptive coloration.

== Control ==
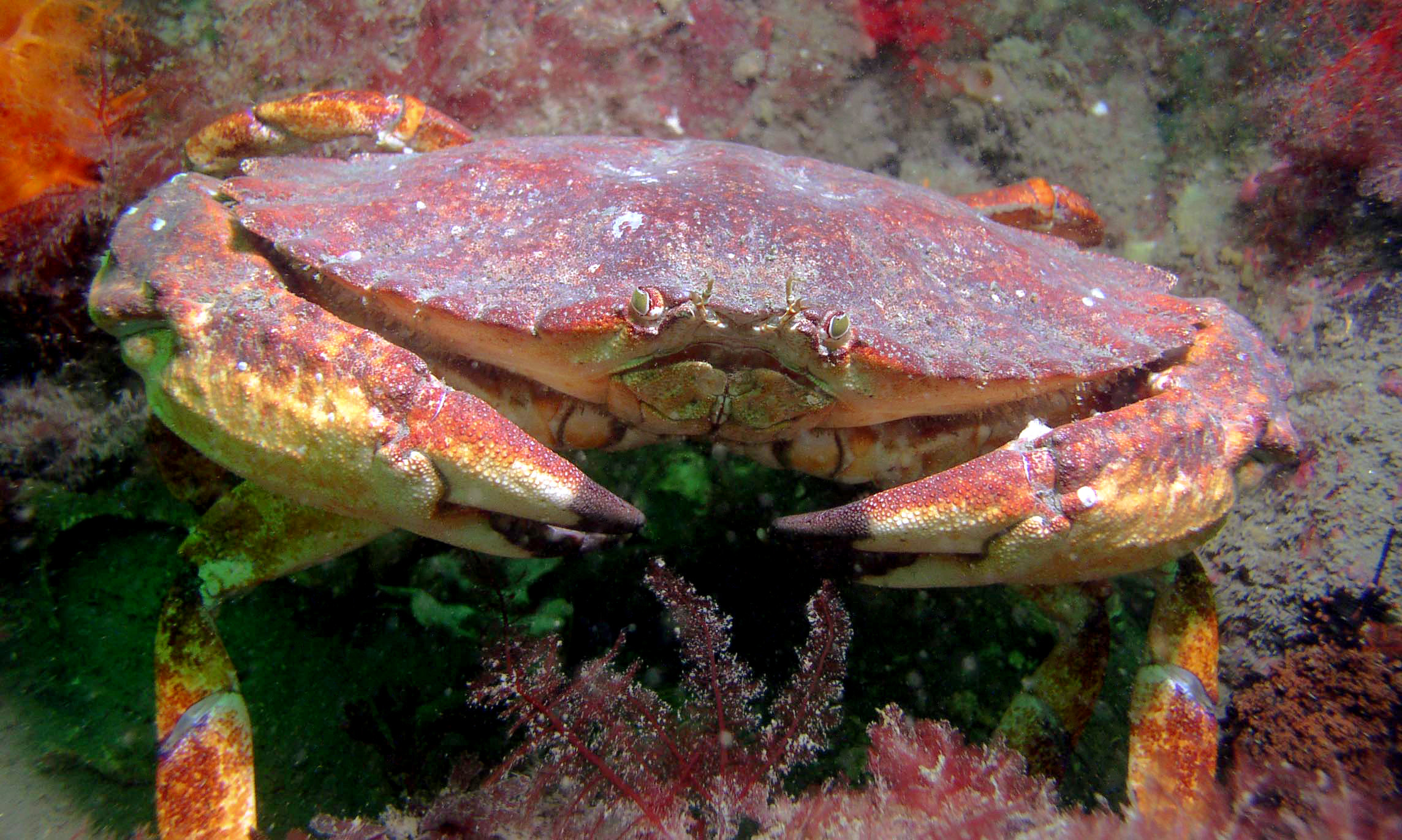
Cancer productus limits the spread of C. maenas in parts of North America

Due to its potentially harmful effects on ecosystems, various efforts have been made to control introduced populations of C. maenas around the world. In Edgartown, Massachusetts, a bounty was levied in 1995 for catching C. maenas, to protect local shellfish, and 10 tons were caught.

Some evidence shows that the native blue crab in eastern North America, Callinectes sapidus, is able to control populations of C. maenas; numbers of the two species are negatively correlated, and C. maenas is not found in the Chesapeake Bay, where C. sapidus is most frequent. On the west coast of North America, C. maenas appears to be limited to upper estuarine habitats, in part because of predation by native rock crabs (Romaleon antennarium and Cancer productus) and competition for shelter with a native shore crab, Hemigrapsus oregonensis. Host specificity testing has recently been conducted on Sacculina carcini, a parasitic barnacle, as a potential biological control agent of C. maenas. In the laboratory, Sacculina settled on, infected, and killed native California crabs, including the Dungeness crab, Metacarcinus magister (formerly Cancer magister), and the shore crabs Hemigrapsus nudus, Hemigrapsus oregonensis and Pachygrapsus crassipes. Dungeness crabs were the most vulnerable of the tested native species to settlement and infection by the parasite. Although Sacculina did not mature in any of the native crabs, developing reproductive sacs were observed inside a few M. magister and H. oregonensis crabs. Any potential benefits of using Sacculina to control C. maenas on the west coast of North America would need to be weighed against these potential nontarget impacts.

=== Use as a food ===
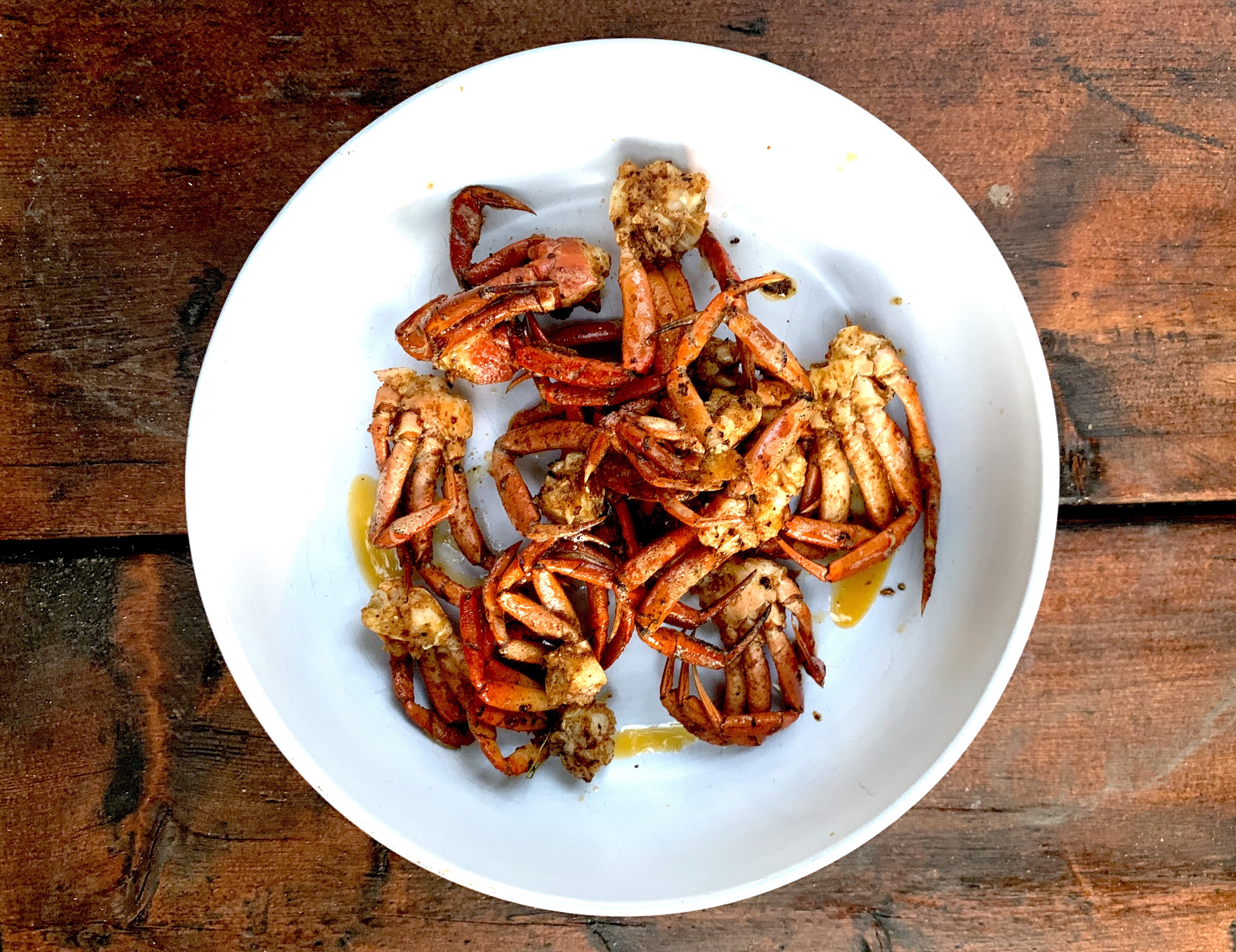
Buttered green crab legs

In its native range, European green crab is mostly used as an ingredient in soups and sauces. However, the closely related Mediterranean green crab (C. aestuarii) has a thriving culinary market in Italy, where fishermen known as moecante cultivate soft-shell green crabs (moeche in Venetian, moleche in Italian) and sell hard-shell crabs for their roe (masinette). Several groups in New England have successfully adapted these methods to produce soft-shell green crabs from the invasive species.

In New England where invasive green crab populations are high, various groups have looked into using green crabs in cuisine. In 2019, The Green Crab Cookbook was released; it included recipes for soft-shell green crab, green crab roe, green crab stock, and green crab meat. One of the book's co-authors went on to found Greencrab.org, an organization dedicated to developing culinary markets for the invasive green crab. In addition to partnering with local chefs and wholesalers for supply chain development and market studies, Greencrab.org has continued to develop green crab recipes and processing techniques.

Researchers at the University of Maine have actively been developing value-added green crab products, with the goals of driving business interest, stimulating a commercial green crab fishery, and alleviating predation effects. Specifically, one study evaluated the consumer acceptability of empanadas (fried, stuffed pastries), which contained varying amounts of green crab mince meat. The empanadas were rated between "like slightly" and "like moderately" for overall acceptability by a consumer panel (n=87). Furthermore, about two-thirds of the panelists would "probably" or "definitely" buy the empanadas if available locally. Additionally, the same researchers developed a patty product made from green crab mince meat using restructuring additives (transglutaminase, dried egg white, isolated soy protein). Although a successful green crab patty was developed, the restructuring additives may have had greater functionality in a raw crab meat system, as opposed to the fully cooked mince that was used in the present study. The results from both studies are considered promising, especially considering that these were initial rounds of green crab product development.

In the past, Legal Sea Foods, an East Coast restaurant chain, experimented with green crabs, creating a green crab stock in their test kitchen during the winter of 2015. In June 2022, Tamworth Distilling, a New Hampshire distillery, teamed up with the University of New Hampshire's NH Green Crab Project to develop House of Tamworth Crab Trapper, which is billed as being "made with a bourbon base steeped with a custom crab, corn, and spice blend mixture".

== Fishery ==
A bucket of crabs

Carcinus maenas is fished on a small scale in the northeast Atlantic Ocean, with about 1200 tonnes being caught annually, mostly in France and the United Kingdom. In the northwest Atlantic, C. maenas was the subject of fishery in the 1960s, and again since 1996, with up to 86 tonnes being caught annually.

== Taxonomic history ==
Carcinus maenas was first given a binomial name, Cancer maenas, by Carl Linnaeus in his 1758 10th edition of Systema Naturae. An earlier description was published by Georg Eberhard Rumphius in his 1705 work De Amboinsche Rariteitkamer, calling the species Cancer marinus sulcatus, but this antedates the starting point for zoological nomenclature. A number of later synonyms have also been published:

- Monoculus taurus Slabber, 1778
- Cancer granarius Herbst, 1783
- Cancer viridis Herbst, 1783
- Cancer pygmaeus Fabricius, 1787
- Cancer rhomboidalis Montagu, 1804
- Cancer granulatus Nicholls, 1943
- Megalopa montagui Leach, 1817
- Portunus menoides Rafinesque-Schmaltz, 1817
- Portunus carcinoides Kinahan, 1857

The lectotype chosen for the species came from Marstrand, Sweden, but it is assumed to have been lost. In 1814, writing for The Edinburgh Encyclopaedia, William Elford Leach erected a new genus, Carcinus to hold this species alone (making it the type species of the genus, by monotypy). In 1847, Nardo described a distinct subspecies occurring in the Mediterranean Sea, which is now recognised as a distinct species, C. aestuarii.

== Neurochemistry ==
Particular amino acids in particular signaling peptides of C. maenas are protonated by pH changes currently (as of 2020) occurring or likely to be reached in the course of future climate change. This significantly alters peptide structure and peptide-mediated behaviours (brood care and egg ventilation requiring about 10 times the normal peptide concentration). The requirement of higher concentration may be due to lowered binding affinity in the sensory epithelium. This effect is very reversible.

== Physiochemistry ==
The usual decrease in extracellular chloride due to increased extracellular bicarbonate is avoided if C. maenas is first acclimated to the increased _{p}CO_{2}. While this may be due to the already-high extracellular chloride levels in this species, it may instead be because moderately higher _{p}CO_{2} increases these levels through some unrelated mechanism.

Changes in pH due to sodium and magnesium can alter extracellular iron concentrations.
