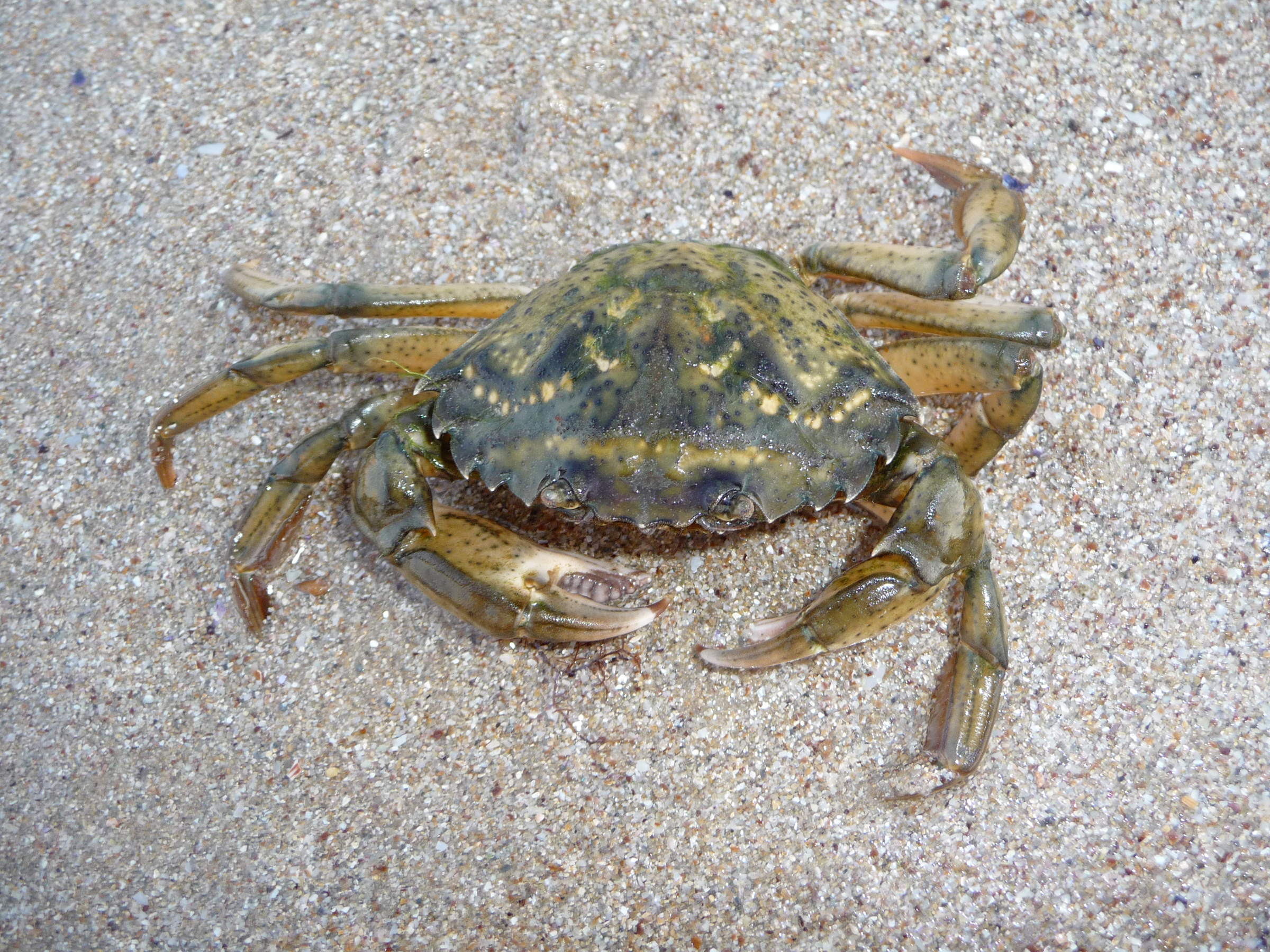

Scientific classification
- Kingdom: Animalia
- Phylum: Arthropoda
- Clade: Pancrustacea
- Class: Malacostraca
- Order: Decapoda
- Suborder: Pleocyemata
- Infraorder: Brachyura
- Family: Carcinidae
- Genus: Carcinus
- Species: C. aestuarii

Binomial name
- Carcinus aestuarii Nardo, 1847

Synonyms
- Carcinus mediterraneus Czerniavsky, 1884; Carcinus maenas aestuarii Nardo, 1847; Portunus menoides Rafinesque, 1817

= Carcinus aestuarii =

Species of crab

Carcinus aestuarii, also known as the Mediterranean green crab, is a littoral crab, native to the Mediterranean Sea.

Carcinus aestuarii bears some similarities to Carcinus maenas and was sometimes considered to be a subspecies thereof, rather than a species in its own right, but a molecular biological study using the COI gene found the difference between the two taxa to be substantial, supporting their status as separate species. The two taxa can be visually distinguished by the front of the carapace, between the eyes, which is short and toothed in C. aestuarii but longer and smoother in C. maenas. Also, the gonopods of C. aestuarii are straight and parallel, whereas those of C. maenas are curved.

== Distribution ==
It is found in the Atlantic Ocean around the Canary Islands, all along the coasts of the Mediterranean and the Black and the Azov Seas, including the Suez Canal.

=== As invasive species ===
Whereas C. maenas has invaded many shorelines throughout the world, C. aestuarii has only been implicated in one invasion; the coastline of Japan has been invaded by either C. aestuarii or a hybrid of C. aestuarii and C. maenas.

== Diet ==
C. aestuarii is an omnivorous predator of small bivalves with soft shells, small crustaceans, and annelids, as well as being a scavenger of dead aquatic animals. Algae are also part of the diet. Eating habits can change throughout its lifespan and seasonally in relation with available food in its habitat.
