= Ángel León (chef) =

Spanish chef

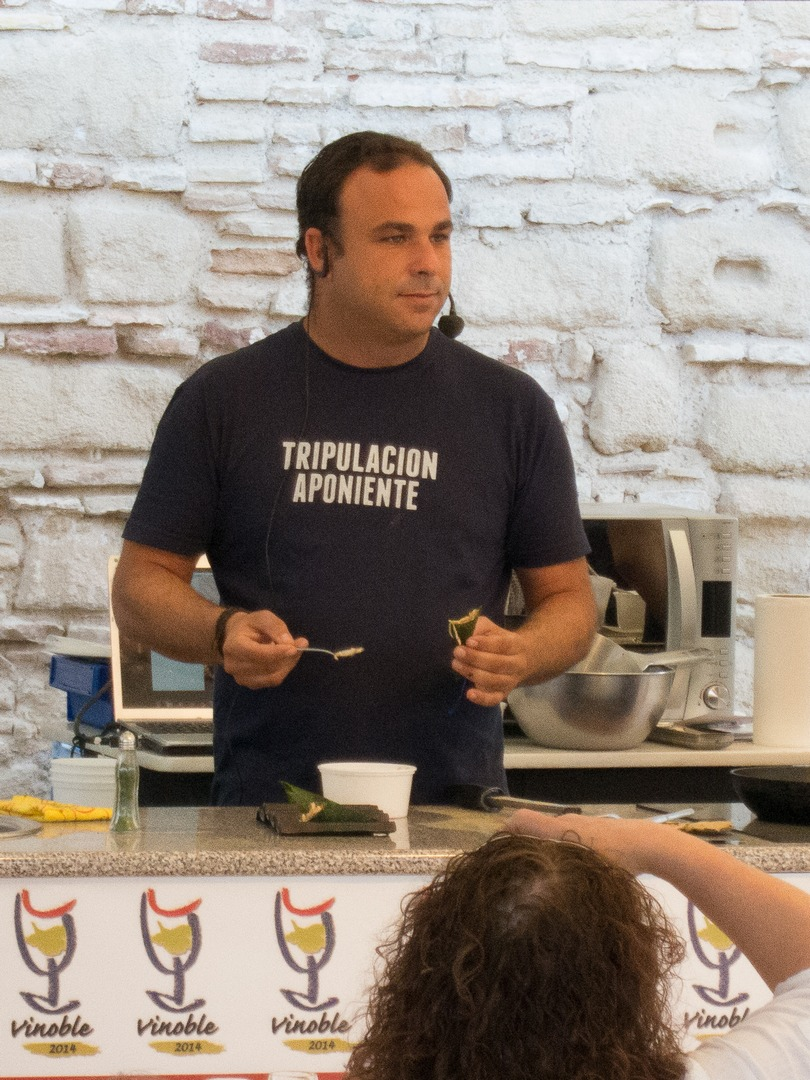
- Ángel León in 2014
- Born: 1977 (age 48–49); Jerez de la Frontera, Spain
- Culinary career
- Rating: (Michelin Guide)
- Current restaurant(s): Aponiente Alevante

Ángel León (born 1977), known across Spain as "el Chef del Mar", is a Spanish chef noted for his experimental seafood dishes.

His restaurant Aponiente, located in El Puerto de Santa María, has been awarded three Michelin stars for the quality of its food, the first such recognition in Andalucia. In its award notice, the Michelin guide described León as "a true visionary".

In the 2020s, León is engaged with a project to explore the culinary uses of Eelgrass, Zostera marina.
