= Johns Rock =

Hazard to shipping in Danish Waters

Johns Rock (Danish: Johns Knold) is a rock in Denmark's territorial waters in the Kattegat bay of the North Sea, near the island of Læsø.

== History ==
On 24 November 1812 HMS Belette was in the Kattegat leading Russian ships through the south-west passage of Anholt towards Gothenburg when she went aground on a sunken rock called "John" (or "Fannot") off Læsø. She sank and broke in two. Her crew took to the rigging but during the night many died of exposure or fell into the sea when they lost their grip. Only six of her entire crew of 120 or so men and boys escaped death from exposure or drowning.

The name of this rock was last recorded in Danish pilotage charts in about 1846 as Johns Knold; there has been no further reference to this feature in Danish charts since then.

Great Britain's Hydrographic Department described the rock in 1895 as "...John's knoll, a dry shoal...". In 1920 the US Hydrographic Office merely refers to the reef as the "Northwest Reef". It also reported that there was a light, "The Northwest Reef Light" on the reef, a quarter of a mile from the outer end of the reef.

== Description ==
One of the most dangerous of the shoal grounds surrounding Læsø is the North West Reef. This reef stretches itself out northwestward on the bearing of NW by ½N, or on the line of Byrum and VesterØes Churches, stretching up to 5 Qmiil (9.25 kilometers) from this latter church, where the edge of four fathoms is to be found. From the land, approximately 1000 Alen (628 meters) out lies a piece of dry ground, called Johns Knold, around which the reef is about 1000 Alen wide with only two feet (0.63 meters) of water. From here the reef continues for another 2000 Alen (1.25 km.) and at its furthest end runs out as a narrow ridge with less than one fathom of water. For most of this stretch it is only 200 Alen wide and the surrounding sandy bottom along the same stretch covers about 3½ - 2 Qmiil ( 6.5 - 3.7 kilometers).

Just before the reef’s outermost end, the depth increases suddenly from four to 22 fathoms. However, this is not a navigable channel but rather an uneven bottom. On the southern side the reef falls away quickly from two and three to six or seven fathoms depth.

A contemporary seamen’s guide describes the safest route for even large ships-of-war from the northern point of Jutland (The Skaw or Skagen) to Winga Island (modern name Vinga) off Gothenburg, well to the north of Læsø in deep water. If, however, with northerly winds the route chosen is to the west of Læsø “they must always get pilots”. A later description of Læsø tells of reefs, sandy spits, rocks, banks, knolls and sea marks, with the passage between the reefs and those of the Dwale Ground on the Jutland side as being 4 miles wide with 8 to 14 fathoms of water.

== Searching for HMS Belette ==
In 2010, a team of five Danish marine archeologists based primarily at Bangsbo Museum, Frederikshavn, began trying to locate HMS Belette using sidescan sonar and a magnetometer.
