= Tentative List of World Heritage Sites =

The Tentative List is a list that contains cultural monuments and protected areas of individual states for which these states seek a nomination as a UNESCO World Heritage Site. The national Tentative Lists are drawn up by the individual States Parties to the "Convention Concerning the Protection of the World Cultural and Natural Heritage" (World Heritage Convention).

== Terminology ==
The English term indicates a "provisional list". The French and Spanish term is liste indicative or lista indicativa ('non-binding list'), while in Italian the English term is adopted as a loanword. The translation by the language service of the Federal Foreign Office is Vorschlagsliste ('Proposal List'): "The Proposal List is an inventory of properties situated in the territory of a State Party which it considers suitable for inscription on the World Heritage List."

== Position in the Procedure ==
Member States can submit Proposal Lists to UNESCO with the proposals planned for inclusion in the World Heritage List within the next five to ten years. A State can nominate a maximum of one site per year to the World Heritage Committee for inscription on the World Heritage List, provided that the site has been on such a list for at least one year. From 2006 to 2018, it was possible to submit two proposals per year and country. Before that, there was no upper limit. Applications can only be submitted by the respective state by February 1 of a given year.

The state simultaneously commits to the maintenance of the monuments. The applications are subsequently reviewed, cultural monuments by ICOMOS and protected areas by IUCN. These bodies submit a report with the results of the review and recommendations to the World Heritage Committee. In the year following the nomination, the World Heritage Committee decides whether the site will be included in the World Heritage List.

== National Lists ==
As of 2020, the World Heritage Committee has proposal lists from 185 of the 194 states parties to the World Heritage Convention. The remaining nine states parties have no proposal list, either because they have not yet submitted such a list, or because the sites contained in a previously submitted list have been designated as World Heritage Sites, rejected by UNESCO, or withdrawn by the respective state.

== See also ==
- List of World Heritage Sites: The overview articles linked there about the World Heritage of individual states also list the sites included on the Proposal List of the respective state.

== Literature ==
- UNESCO Commissions of Germany, Austria, Switzerland, and Luxembourg (Ed.): Welterbe-Manual. Handbuch zur Umsetzung der Welterbekonvention in Deutschland, Österreich und der Schweiz. 2nd edition, Bonn 2009.
