= Crabs of the British Isles =

Largest and smallest crabs of the British Isles

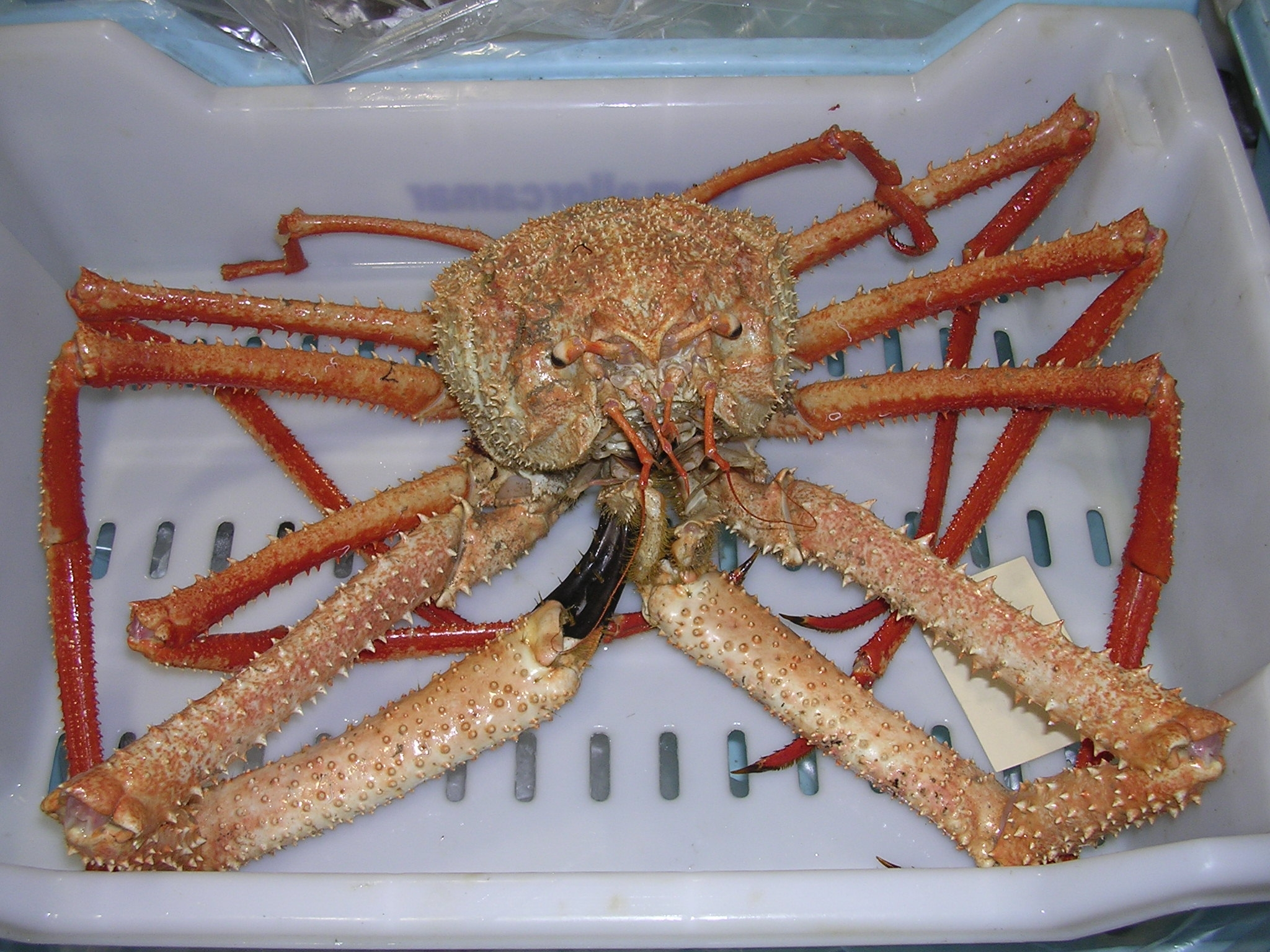
Paromola cuvieri (up to 120 cm claw span)

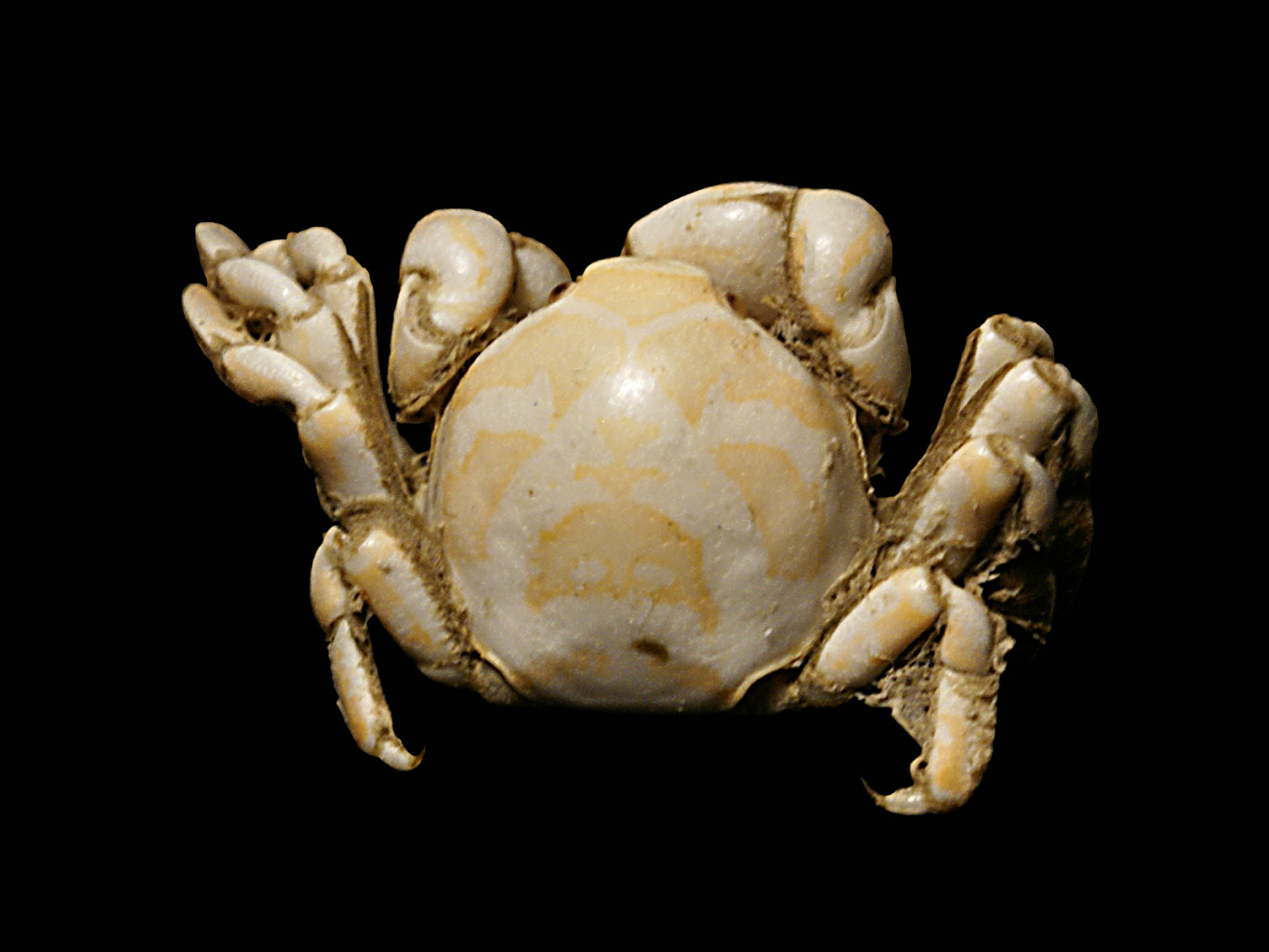
Pinnotheres pisum (up to 4 mm across the carapace)

Around 65 species of crab occur in the waters of the British Isles. (Note: Howson & Picton define the waters of the British Isles to be the area within the 200 metres (660 ft) isobath surrounding the British Isles, between 48 °N and 62.5 °N, and between 13 °W and 6 °E; this includes the English Channel and parts of the North Sea coasts of Belgium and the Netherlands, but excludes the Faroe Islands.) All are marine, with the exception of the introduced Chinese mitten crab, Eriocheir sinensis, which occurs in fresh and brackish water. They range in size from the deep-water species Paromola cuvieri, which can reach a claw span of 1.2 metres (3 ft 11 in), to the pea crab, which is only 4 mm (0.16 in) wide and lives inside mussel shells.

== Fisheries ==
Commercial crabs in the British Isles

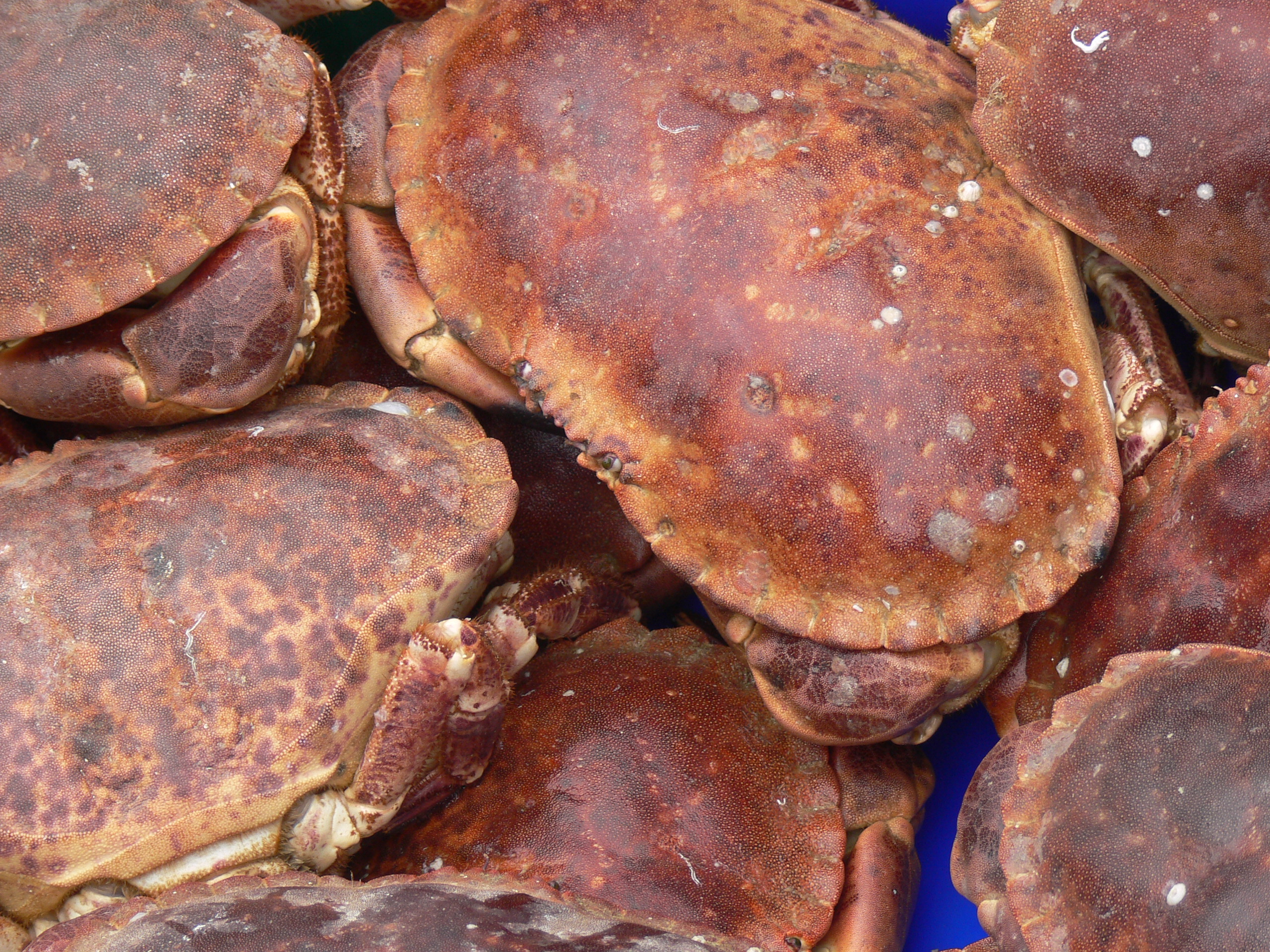
Nearly 30,000 t of the edible crab Cancer pagurus is landed in the British Isles every year.

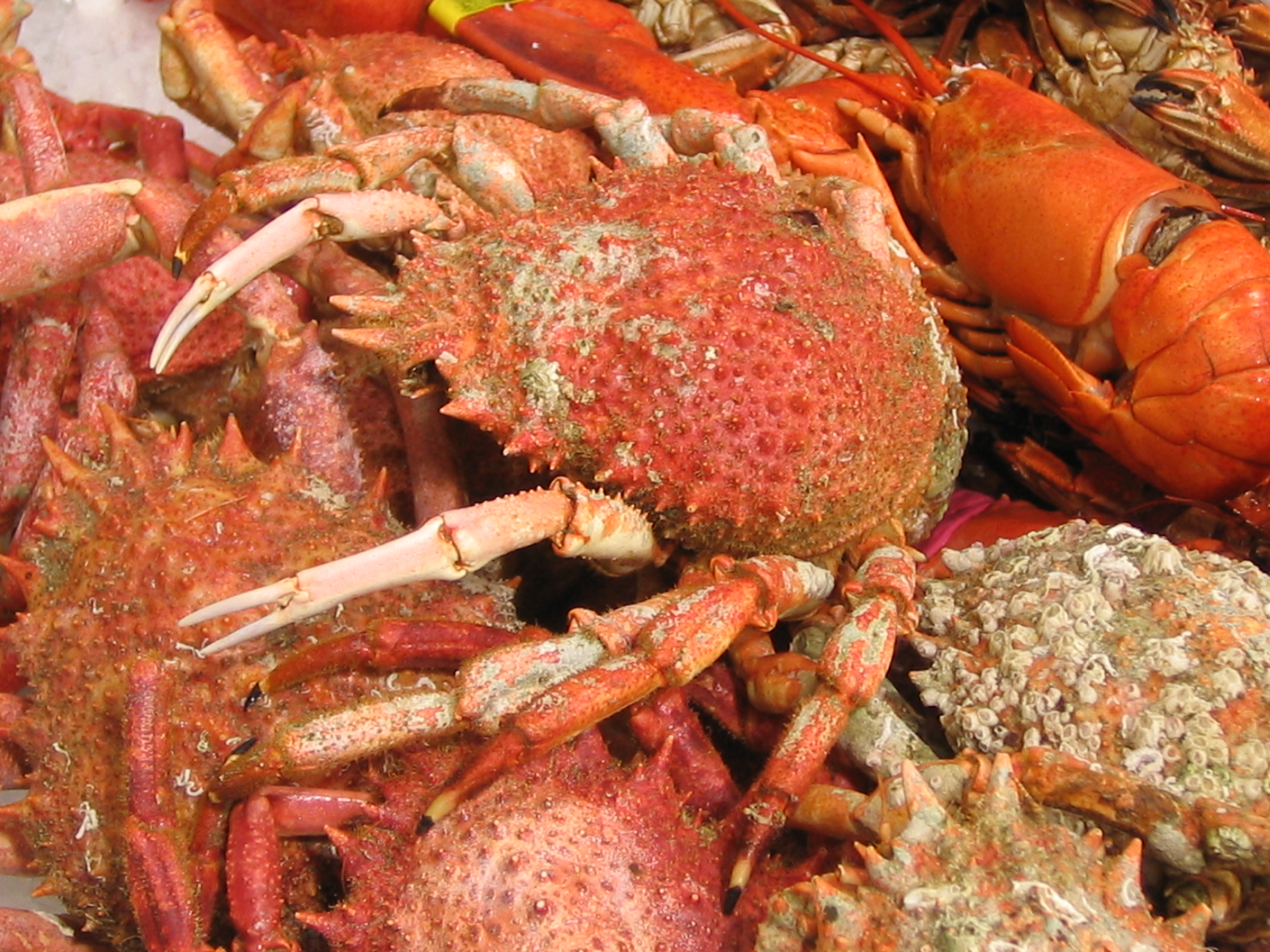
1,500 t of the spider crab Maja brachydactyla is landed in the British Isles every year.

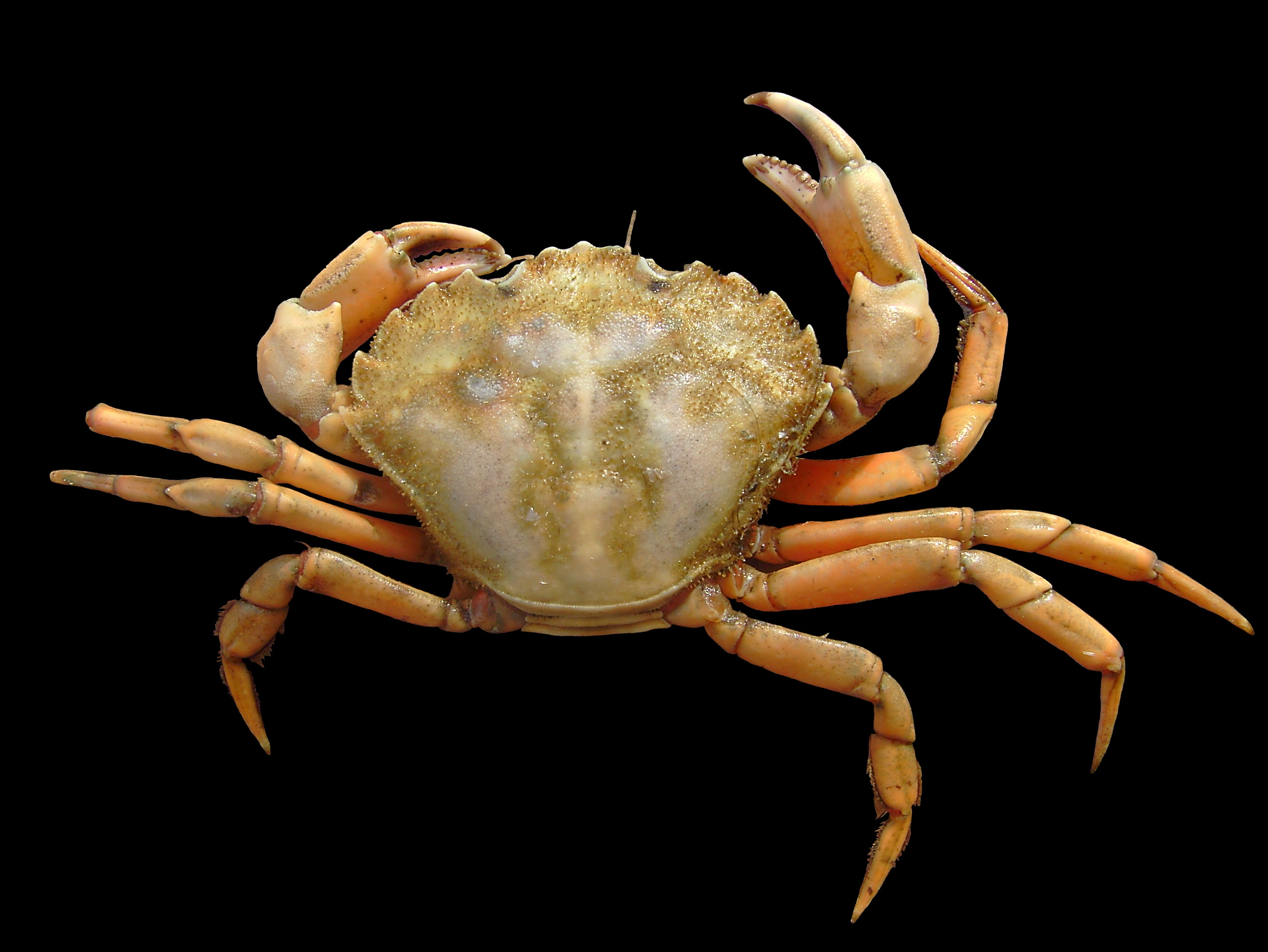
More than 500 t of the shore crab, Carcinus maenas, is landed in the British Isles every year.

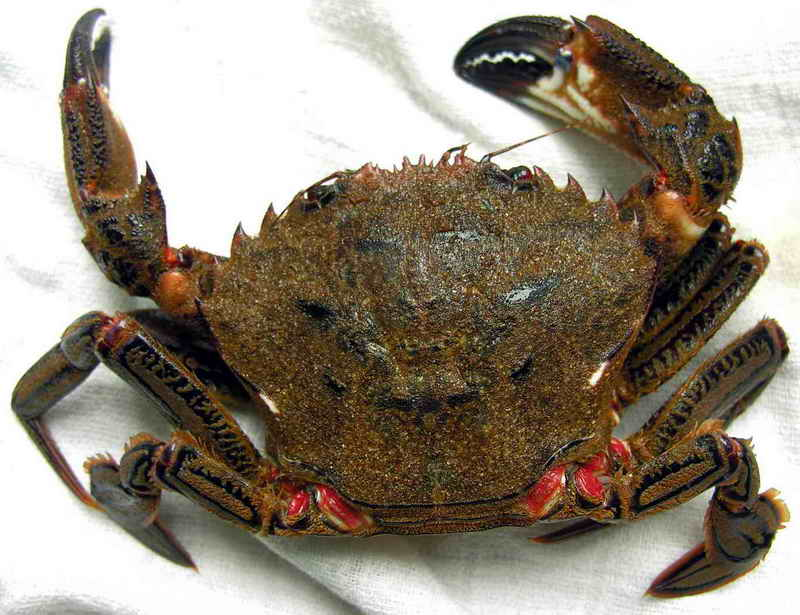
Up to 200 t of the velvet crab, Necora puber, is landed in the British Isles every year.

Several species of wild crab are the subject of crab fisheries around the coasts of the British Isles. The most important are the brown crab or edible crab, Cancer pagurus (29,193 t), various swimming crabs (3,180 t), the spider crab Maja brachydactyla (1,565 t), the shore crab or green crab Carcinus maenas (553 t) and the velvet crab Necora puber (193 t). Around 77% of the catch is landed in the United Kingdom, 19% in Ireland, 4% in the Channel Islands, and 1% in the Isle of Man. (Note: Fishery data is for the year 2009, and is taken from the FAO's online database, summing the captures for the Channel Islands, Isle of Man, Ireland and the United Kingdom.)

== Species ==
62 species have been directly observed in the waters of the British Isles: (Note: Nomenclature follows Ng et al. (2009).)

Dromiidae

- Dromia personata (Linnaeus, 1758)

Homolidae

- Paromola cuvieri (Risso, 1816)

Leucosiidae

- Ebalia cranchii Leach, 1817
- Ebalia granulosa H. Milne-Edwards, 1837
- Ebalia nux A. Milne-Edwards, 1883
- Ebalia tuberosa (Pennant, 1777)
- Ebalia tumefacta (Montagu, 1808)

Majidae

- Maja brachydactyla Balss, 1922
- Eurynome aspera (Pennant, 1777)
- Eurynome spinosa Hailstone, 1835

Oregoniidae

- Hyas araneus (Linnaeus, 1758)
- Hyas coarctatus Leach, 1815

Inachidae

- Achaeus cranchii Leach, 1817
- Inachus dorsettensis (Pennant, 1777)
- Inachus leptochirus Leach, 1817
- Inachus phalangium (Fabricius, 1775)
- Macropodia deflexa Forest, 1978
- Macropodia linaresi Forest & Zariquiey Alvarez, 1964
- Macropodia rostrata (Linnaeus, 1761)
- Macropoda tenuirostris (Leach, 1814)

Epialtidae

- Pisa armata (Latreille, 1803)
- Pisa tetraodon (Pennant, 1777)

Parthenopidae

- Parthenopides massena (Roux, 1830)

Corystidae

- Corystes cassivelaunus (Pennant, 1777)

Atelecyclidae

- Atelecyclus rotundatus (Olivi, 1792)
- Atelecyclus undecimdentatus (Herbst, 1783)

Thiidae

- Thia scutellata (Fabricius, 1793)

Pirimelidae

- Pirimela denticulata (Montagu, 1808)

Cancridae

- Cancer bellianus Johnson, 1861
- Cancer pagurus Linnaeus, 1758

Portunidae

- Callinectes sapidus Rathbun, 1896
- Carcinus maenas (Linnaeus, 1758)
- Bathynectes longipes (Risso, 1816)
- Bathynectes maravigna (Prestandrea, 1839)
- Liocarcinus corrugatus (Pennant, 1777)
- Liocarcinus depurator (Linnaeus, 1758)
- Liocarcinus holsatus (Fabricius, 1798)
- Liocarcinus marmoreus (Leach, 1814)
- Liocarcinus navigator (Herbst, 1794)
- Liocarcinus pusillus (Leach, 1815)
- Liocarcinus zariquieyi Gordon, 1968
- Macropipus tuberculatus (Roux, 1830)
- Necora puber (Linnaeus, 1767)
- Polybius henslowii Leach, 1820
- Portumnus latipes (Pennant, 1777)
- Xaiva biguttata (Risso, 1816)

Geryonidae

- Geryon trispinosus (Herbst, 1803)

Goneplacidae

- Goneplax rhomboides (Linnaeus, 1758)

Xanthidae

- Monodaeus couchi (Couch, 1851)
- Xantho hydrophilus (Herbst, 1790)
- Xantho pilipes A. Milne-Edwards, 1867

Panopeidae

- Dyspanopeus sayi (S. I. Smith, 1869)
- Rhithropanopeus harrisii (Gould, 1841)

Pilumnoididae

- Pilumnoides inglei Guinot & Macpherson, 1987

Pilumnidae

- Pilumnus hirtellus (Linnaeus, 1761)

Grapsidae

- Pachygrapsus marmoratus (Fabricius, 1787)
- Planes minutus (Linnaeus, 1758)

Varunidae

- Brachynotus sexdentatus (Risso, 1827)
- Eriocheir sinensis H. Milne-Edwards, 1853
- Asthenognathus atlanticus Monod, 1933

Pinnotheridae

- Nepinnotheres pinnotheres (Linnaeus, 1758)
- Pinnotheres pisum (Linnaeus, 1767)

Three deep-water species have also been recorded near the British Isles, and are likely to occur in the area. These are:

- Cymonomus granulatus (Norman in Wyville Thomson, 1873) (Cymonomidae)
- Dorhynchus thomsoni Wyville Thomson, 1873 (Inachidae)
- Rochinia carpenteri (Wyville Thomson, 1873) (Epialtidae)
