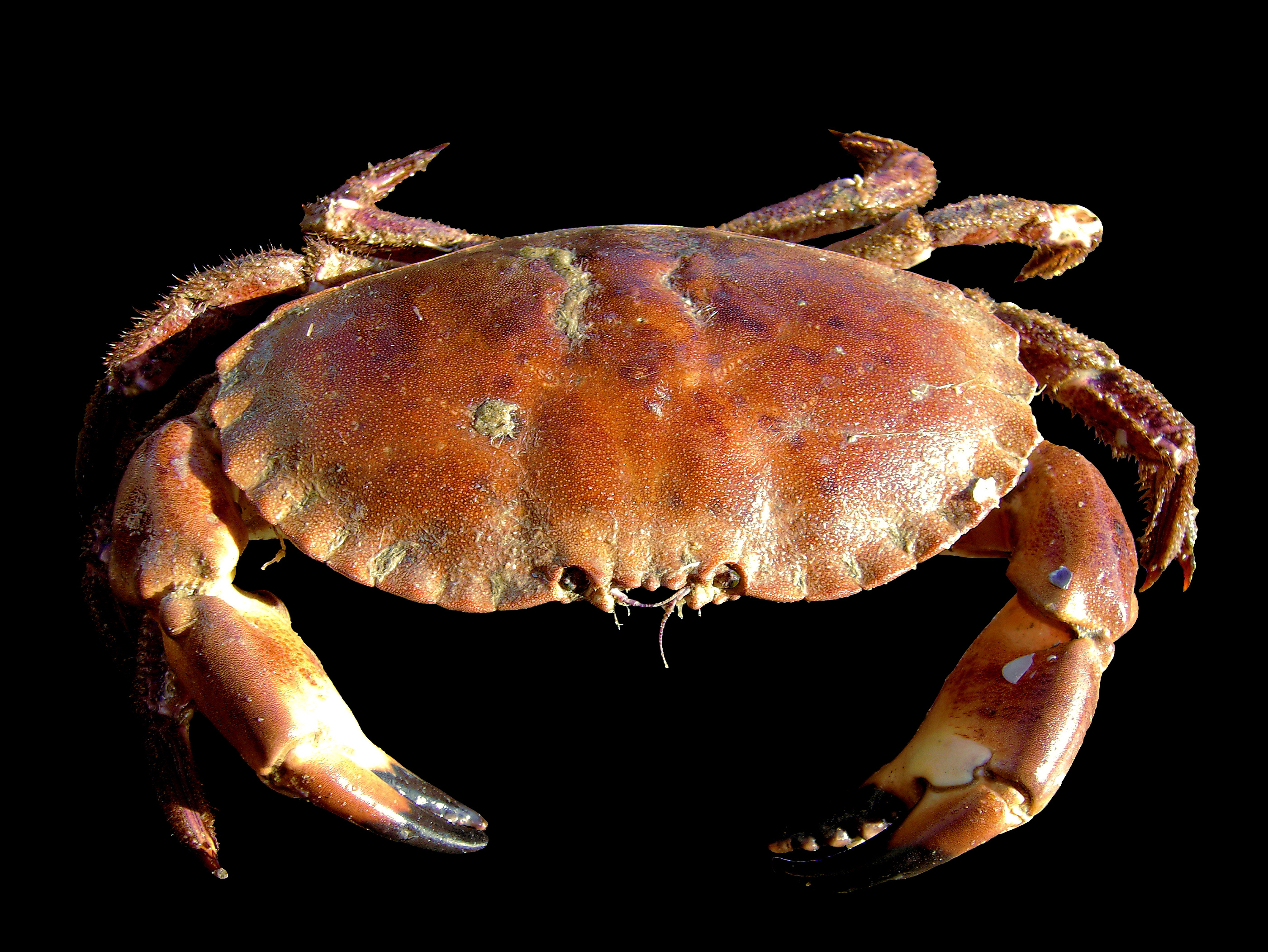
- Cancer pagurus

Scientific classification
- Kingdom: Animalia
- Phylum: Arthropoda
- Clade: Pancrustacea
- Class: Malacostraca
- Order: Decapoda
- Suborder: Pleocyemata
- Infraorder: Brachyura
- Subsection: Heterotremata
- Superfamily: Cancroidea; Latreille, 1802

Families
- Atelecyclidae; Cancridae

= Cancroidea =

Superfamily of crabs

Cancroidea is a superfamily of crabs, comprising the families Atelecyclidae and Cancridae. Four other families have been separated into new superfamilies: Cheiragonidae into Cheiragonoidea, Corystidae into Corystoidea, and both Pirimelidae and Thiidae into Portunoidea. Montezumellidae has been moved from Cancroidea to its own superfamily Montezumelloidea.
