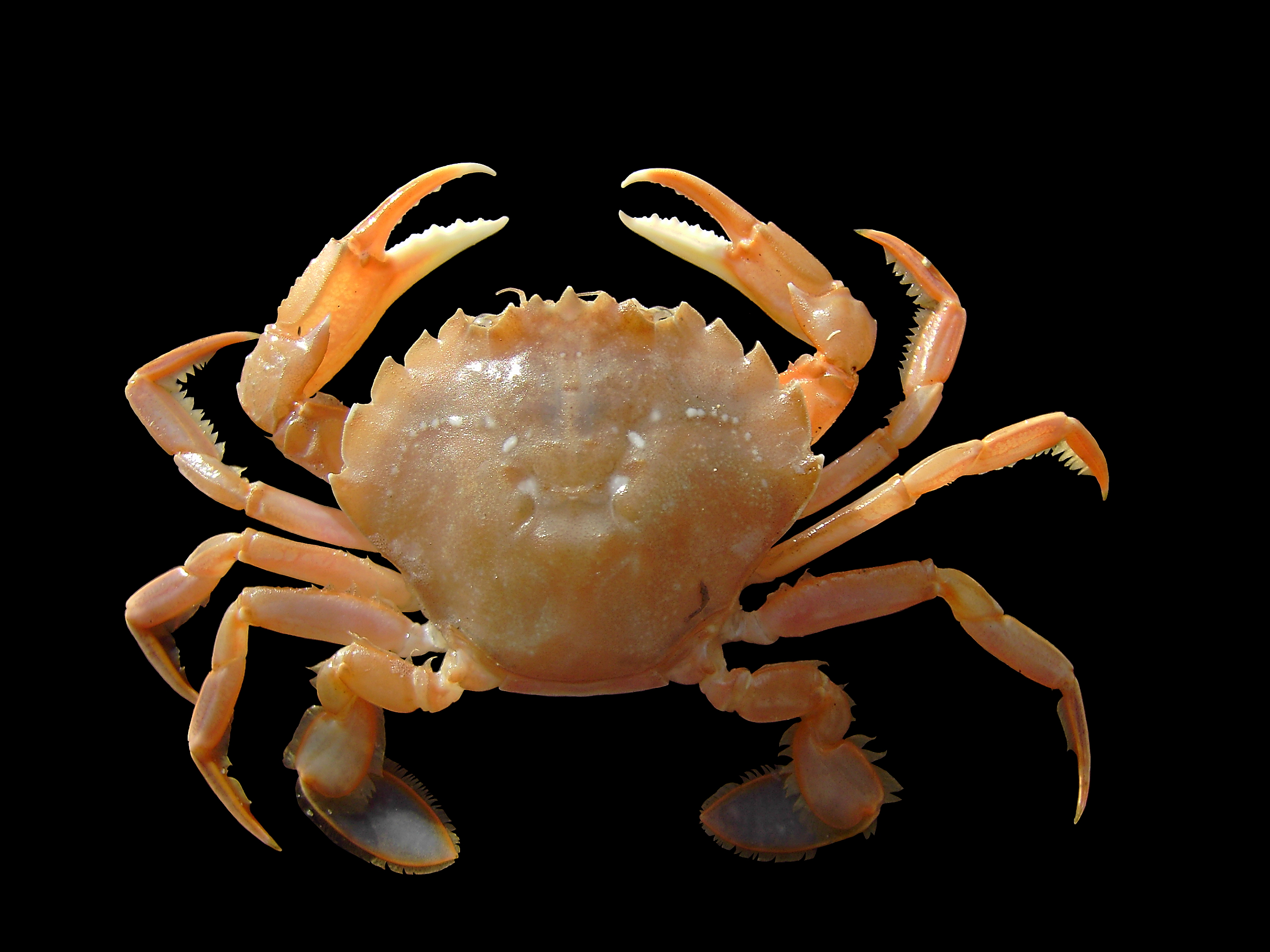

Scientific classification
- Kingdom: Animalia
- Phylum: Arthropoda
- Clade: Pancrustacea
- Class: Malacostraca
- Order: Decapoda
- Suborder: Pleocyemata
- Infraorder: Brachyura
- Family: Polybiidae
- Genus: Polybius
- Species: P. holsatus

Binomial name
- Polybius holsatus (Fabricius, 1798)

Synonyms
- Polybius holsatus (Fabricius, 1798); Macropipus holsatus (Fabricius, 1798)

= Polybius holsatus =

Species of crab

Polybius holsatus, sometimes known by the common name flying crab, is a species of swimming crab found chiefly in the North Sea, Irish Sea and English Channel. It has a carapace up to 4 centimetres (1.6 in) wide, which is brownish-grey with a green tinge. It is very similar in appearance to the harbour crab Polybius depurator.

The diet of P. holsatus comprises crustaceans, especially juvenile Crangon, molluscs such as Macoma balthica, and fish. P. holsatus sometimes hosts the parasitic barnacle Sacculina.
