= Polybius zariquieyi =

Scientific classification
- Kingdom: Animalia
- Phylum: Arthropoda
- Clade: Pancrustacea
- Class: Malacostraca
- Order: Decapoda
- Suborder: Pleocyemata
- Infraorder: Brachyura
- Family: Polybiidae
- Genus: Polybius
- Species: P. zariquieyi

Binomial name
- Polybius zariquieyi (Gordon, 1968)

Synonyms
- Macropipus zariquieyi Gordon, 1968

Species of crab

Polybius zariquieyi is a species of crab found in the Mediterranean Sea. It closely resembles Polybius pusillus and was for a long time confused with that species.

== Taxonomic history ==
The species now known as Polybius zariquieyi was first recognised by Bruno Parisi in 1915. Parisi realised that the species then known as "Portunus pusillus" comprised two separate taxa. The species was recognised during the revision of two species originally described in the genus Portunus by Parisi, "Portunus pusillus" and "Portunus parvulus". Parisi mistakenly asserted, however, that of his two species, "P. parvulus" was the new one. In fact, his "P. pusillus" was the new species. This error was recognised by the Dutch carcinologist Lipke Holthuis in 1958 who continued using Parisi's names while awaiting Gordon's revision. In 1968, Gordon published a paper in the journal Crustaceana, distinguishing "Macropipus zariquieyi" from the species that by then had become "Macropipus pusillus" (now Polybius pusillus). She selected as the holotype a specimen from Sorrento, collected at a depth of 60 metres (200 ft). The specific epithet zariquieyi commemorates Ricardo Zariquiey Alvarez, who had recognised the two species in Spanish waters, and provided material to Gordon that allowed her to describe the new species.

== Distribution ==
Polybius zariquieyi is found in the Mediterranean Sea and the Canary Islands. A single specimen, in the collections of Alfred Merle Norman, purports to be from the east coast of Great Britain. The crab inhabits depths of 10–60 metres (33–197 ft) on coarse sandy or gravelly substrates.

== Description ==
Froglia and Manning reported a range of carapace lengths among males of 7.4–12.7 millimetres (0.29–0.50 in); females up to 13.4 mm (0.53 in) have been reported. It differs from other species in the "pusillus group" (Polybius maculatus and Polybius pusillus) in having a smooth carapace. Also, the teeth on the antero-lateral margin of the carapace are all rounded at the tip, and the fourth is larger than the fifth, and the carpus (4th segment) is shorter than the propodus (6th segment) on the third and fourth pereiopods in L. zariquieyi but not L. pusillus of L. maculatus.
