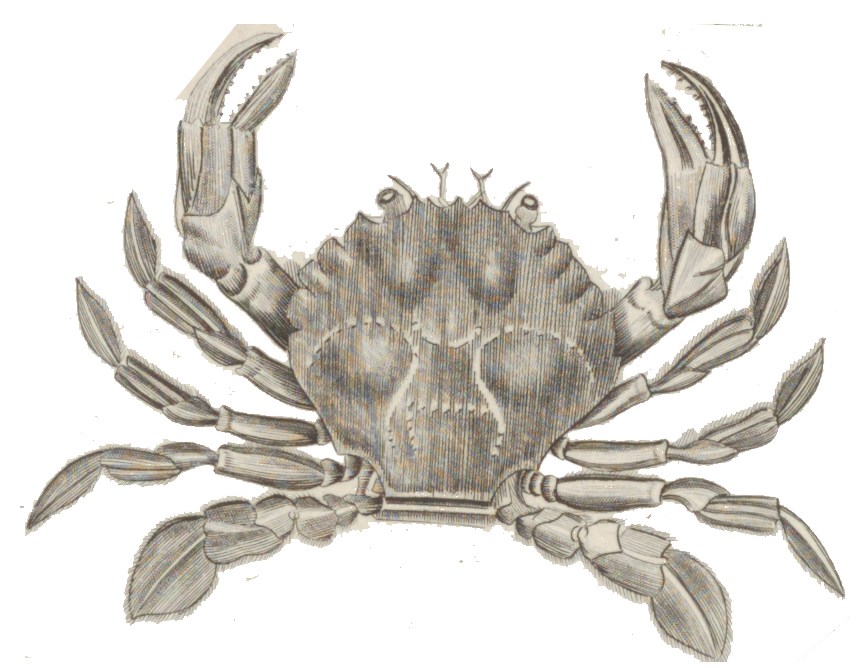
- Polybius henslowii

Scientific classification
- Domain: Eukaryota
- Kingdom: Animalia
- Phylum: Arthropoda
- Class: Malacostraca
- Order: Decapoda
- Suborder: Pleocyemata
- Infraorder: Brachyura
- Family: Polybiidae
- Genus: Polybius; Leach, 1820

= Polybius (crab) =

Genus of crabs

Polybius is a genus of crabs in the family Polybiidae. It contains the following species:

- Polybius bolivari (Zariquey Álvarez, 1948)
- Polybius corrugatus (Pennant, 1777)
- Polybius depurator (Linnaeus, 1758)
- Polybius dioscurus García-Raso, d'Udekem d'Acoz, Moukrim, Schubart & Cuesta, 2024
- †Polybius heintzi (Schweitzer & Feldmann, 2010)
- Polybius henslowii Leach, 1820
- Polybius holsatus (Fabricius, 1798)
- †Polybius kuehni (Bachmayer, 1953)
- Polybius maculatus (Risso, 1827)
- Polybius marmoreus (Leach, 1814)
- Polybius navigator (Herbst, 1794)
- †Polybius oroszyi (Bachmayer, 1953)
- †Polybius praearcuatus (Müller, 1996)
- Polybius pusillus (Leach, 1816)
- Polybius strigilis (Stimpson, 1858)
- Polybius vernalis (Risso, 1827)
- Polybius zariquieyi (Gordon, 1968)
