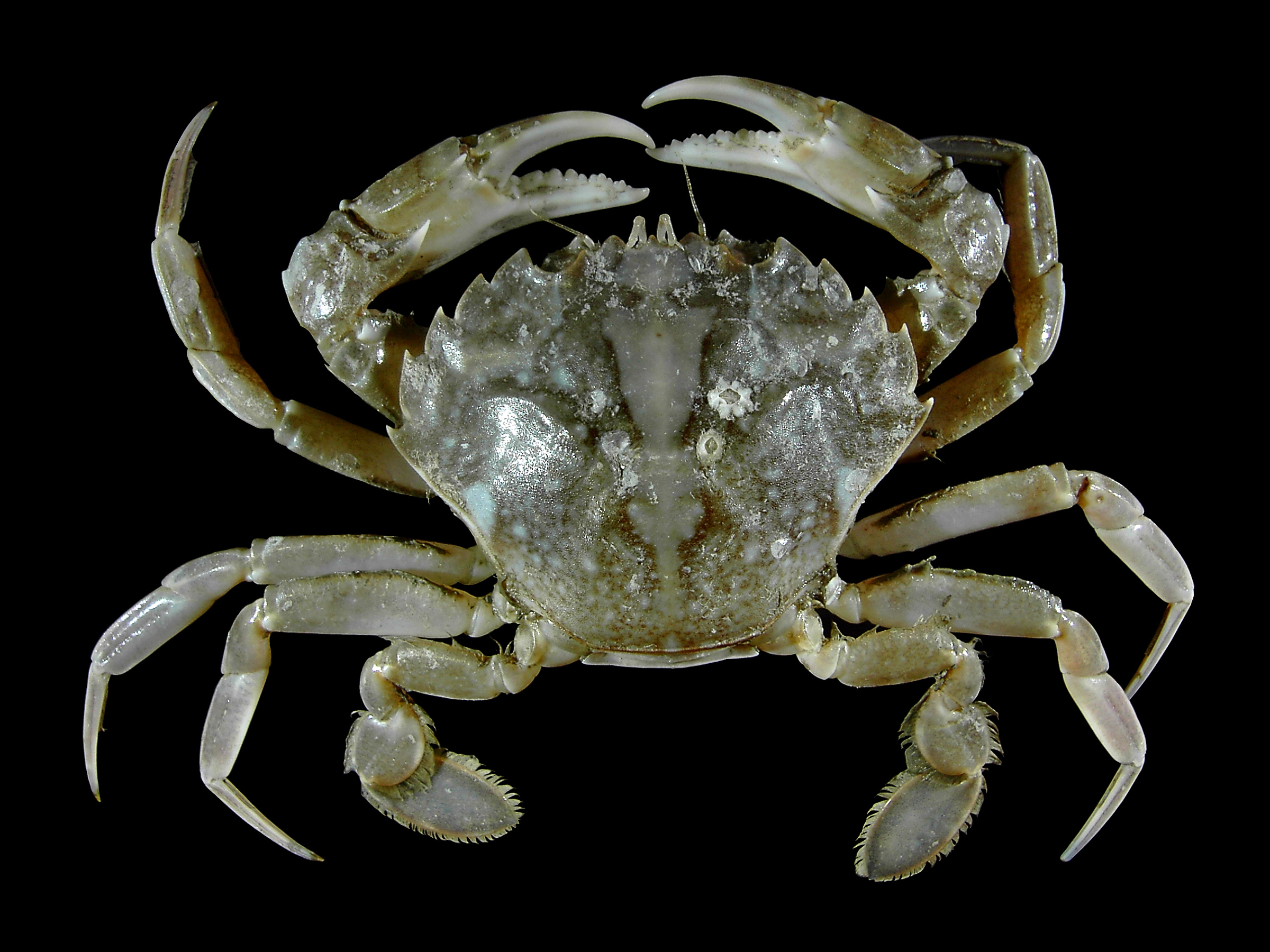

Scientific classification
- Domain: Eukaryota
- Kingdom: Animalia
- Phylum: Arthropoda
- Class: Malacostraca
- Order: Decapoda
- Suborder: Pleocyemata
- Infraorder: Brachyura
- Family: Polybiidae
- Genus: Polybius
- Species: P. dioscurus

Binomial name
- Polybius dioscurus García-Raso, d'Udekem d'Acoz, Moukrim, Schubart & Cuesta, 2024

= Polybius dioscurus =

Species of crab

Polybius dioscurus, the Atlantic grey swimming crab, is a small, shallow-water crab in the family Polybiidae. P. dioscurus is a northeast Atlantic species.
