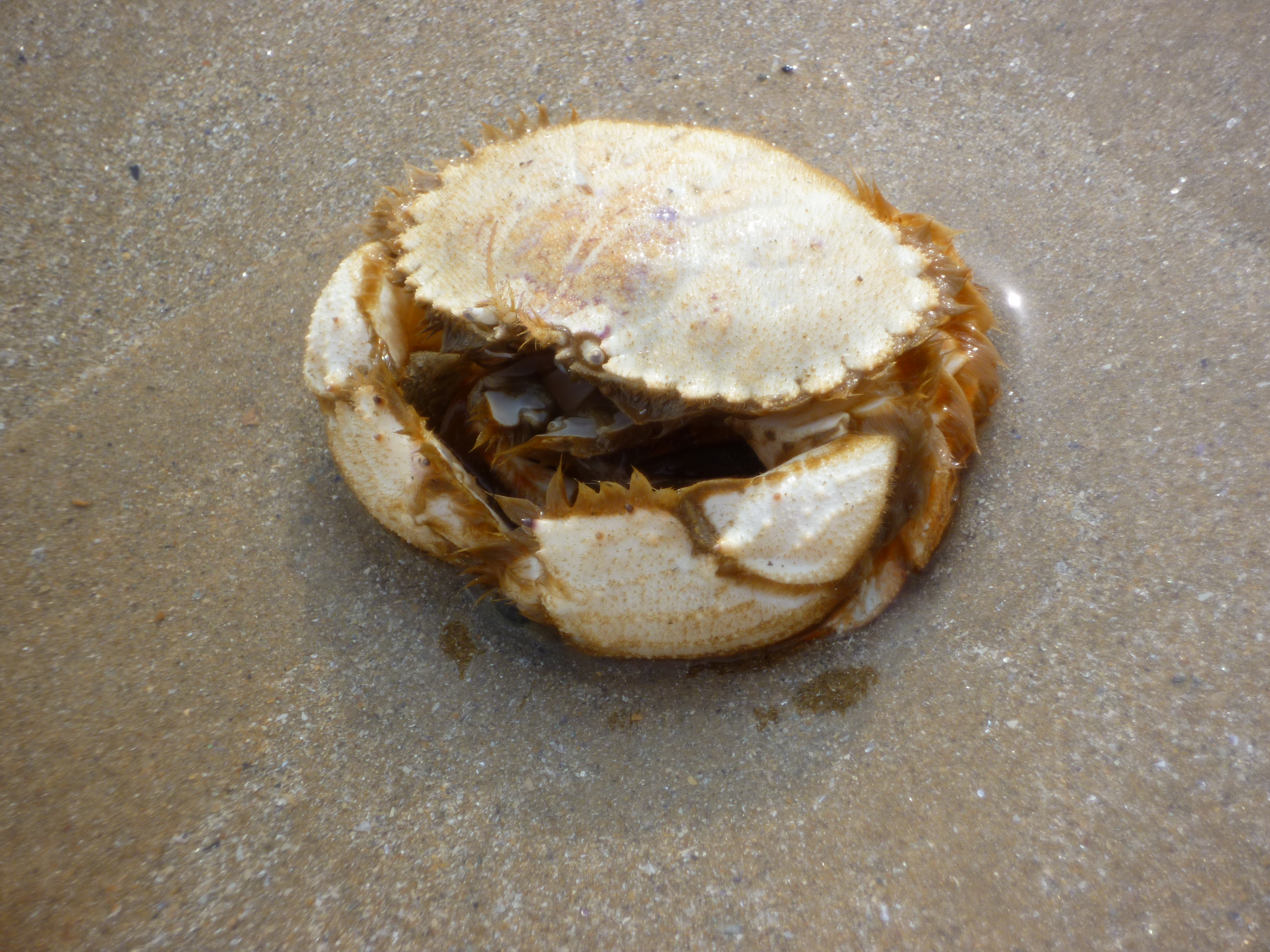

Scientific classification
- Kingdom: Animalia
- Phylum: Arthropoda
- Clade: Pancrustacea
- Class: Malacostraca
- Order: Decapoda
- Suborder: Pleocyemata
- Infraorder: Brachyura
- Family: Atelecyclidae
- Genus: Atelecyclus
- Species: A. undecimdentatus

Binomial name
- Atelecyclus undecimdentatus (Herbst, 1783)

= Atelecyclus undecimdentatus =

Species of crab

Atelecyclus undecimdentatus is a species of crab in the family Atelecyclidae.

== Description ==
The body of this crab is quite hairy, and has a whitish to cream colour, with purple marks on the carapace. The carapace has a smooth texture and a fringe of long setae. It is significantly wider than it is long, growing up to 5 cm long and 6.3 cm wide. The postero-lateral margins strongly converge.

A. undecimdentatus is often very dirty which can alter its appearance. It has short antennae, being only about a quarter of the length of the carapace. The claws are similar to each other, with black tips. Both the claws and legs have many bristles.

This crab is sometimes mistaken for the more common Atelecyclus rotundatus. However, A. rotundatus can be distinguished by its finer granulations and narrower carapace.

== Distribution ==
This species is found in the coastal Atlantic Ocean, the English Channel, and also rarely occurs in the Mediterranean Sea.

== Habitat ==
Atelecyclus undecimdentatus normally lives in waters around 30 metres deep on bottoms ranging from gravel to sandy mud, sometimes under rocks.
