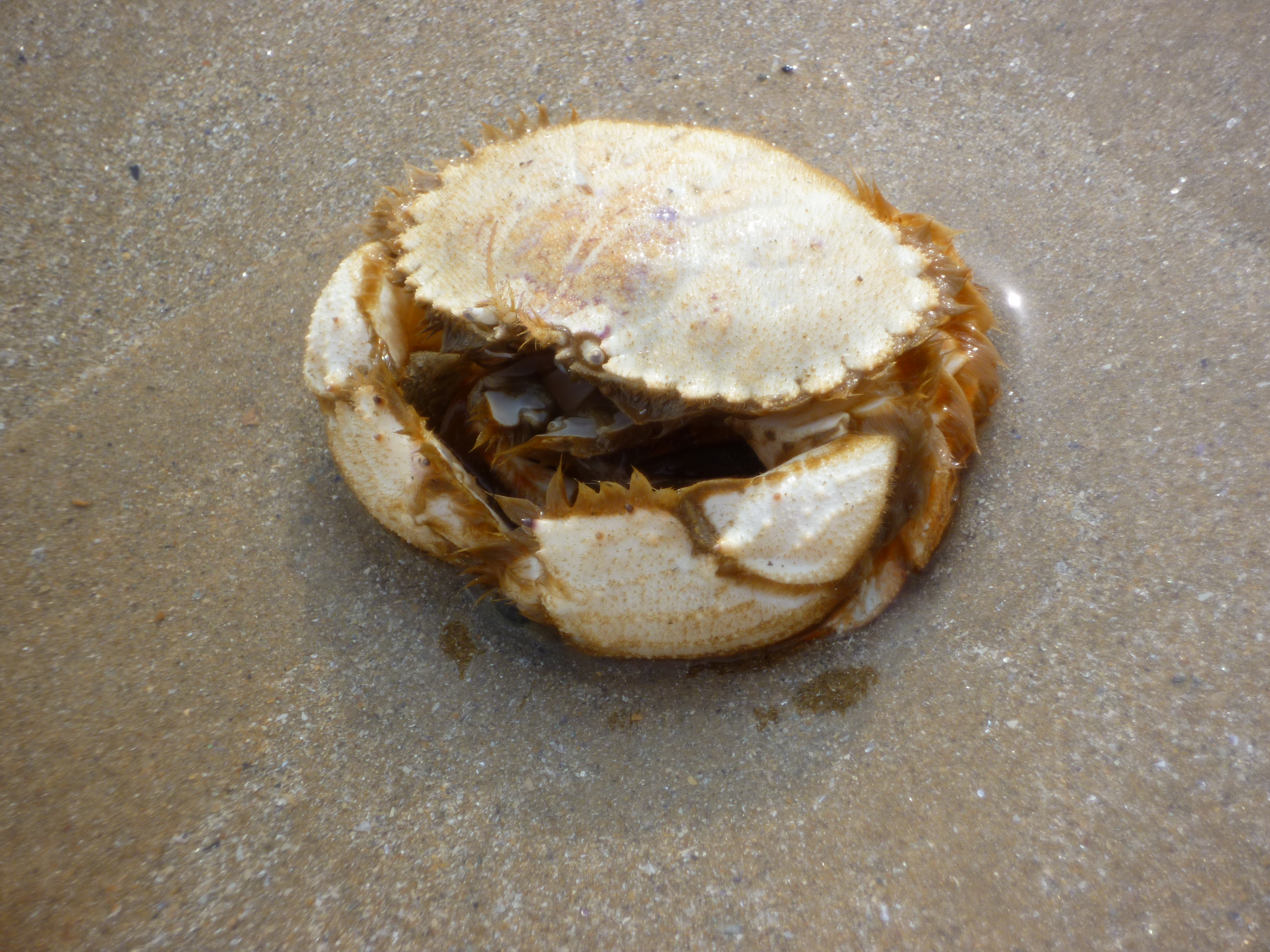
- Atelecyclus undecimdentatus

Scientific classification
- Kingdom: Animalia
- Phylum: Arthropoda
- Clade: Pancrustacea
- Class: Malacostraca
- Order: Decapoda
- Suborder: Pleocyemata
- Infraorder: Brachyura
- Family: Atelecyclidae
- Genus: Atelecyclus; Leach, 1814

= Atelecyclus =

Genus of crabs

Atelecyclus is a genus of crab in the family Atelecyclidae, containing two species:

- Atelecyclus rotundatus (Olivi, 1792)
- Atelecyclus undecimdentatus (Herbst, 1783)
