= Carcineretidae =

Carcineretidae Temporal range: late Cretaceous

Scientific classification
- Kingdom: Animalia
- Phylum: Arthropoda
- Clade: Pancrustacea
- Class: Malacostraca
- Order: Decapoda
- Suborder: Pleocyemata
- Infraorder: Brachyura
- Superfamily: Portunoidea
- Family: †Carcineretidae; Beurlen, 1930

Genera
- †Branchiocarcinus; †Cancrixantho; †Carcineretes; †Mascatanada

Extinct family of crabs

Carcineretidae is a prehistoric family of heterotrematan crustaceans. They are only known from Cretaceous fossils. These crabs are tentatively placed in the superfamily Portunoidea and resemble the swimming crabs (Portunidae) in having some paddle-shaped pereiopods. But it is not certain that this placement is correct, as the Carcineretidae also show some similarities to the Matutidae of superfamily Leucosioidea and the Goneplacidae of superfamily Xanthoidea.

== Description ==
Their carapace is usually wider than long and of square or ovate shape. Its epibranchial region is bulbous, and it bears at least one transverse ridge in the protogastric, hepatic or branchial region. Unlike in the living Portunoidea, the front (the part of the carapace above the head) is narrow; it bears a few blunt spines in some species. The hind part of the carapace is also narrowed, tapering from just behind the eyes. Around the eyes, also atypical for portunoideans, the carapace makes a wide curve and is beset with spines and notches.

The chelipeds are quite robust – more so than the second to fifth pereiopods – and in some the manus is keeled on the outside. Each "paddle" is formed by the flattened propodus and dactyls of the fourth and/or fifth pereiopods.

At least in males, the first and second sternite are fused, with no suture visible. The suture between sternites 2 and 3 is conspicuous and deep, the one between sternites 3 and 4 incomplete. The eighth sternite is not visible from below. The abdominal of males is narrow, with (probably) completely free somites, and the first to fourth abdominal somite entirely fill the space between the coxae of the fifth pereiopods.

== Genera ==
Four genera are recognised in the family Carcineretidae:

- †Branchiocarcinus Vega, Feldmann & Sour-Tovar, 1995
- †Cancrixantho Van Straelen, 1934
- †Carcineretes Withers, 1922
- †Mascaranada Vega & Feldmann, 1991
