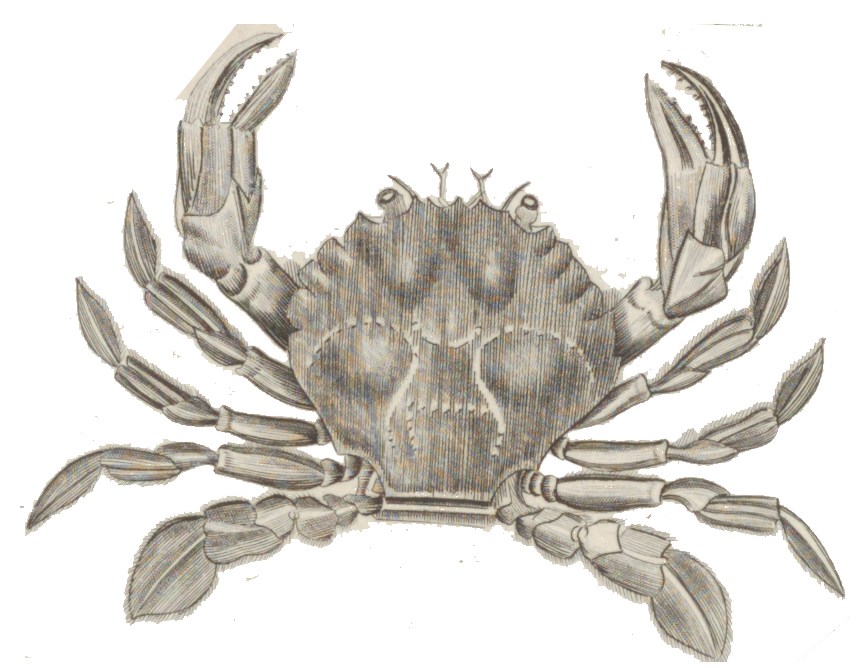

Scientific classification
- Kingdom: Animalia
- Phylum: Arthropoda
- Class: Malacostraca
- Order: Decapoda
- Suborder: Pleocyemata
- Infraorder: Brachyura
- Family: Polybiidae
- Genus: Polybius; Leach, 1820
- Species: P. henslowii

Binomial name
- Polybius henslowii Leach, 1820

= Polybius henslowii =

Species of crab

Polybius henslowii is a species of crab in the family Polybiidae. It is a capable swimmer and feeds in open water in the north-east Atlantic Ocean and western Mediterranean Sea.

== Description ==
The carapace of Polybius henslowii is almost circular, 48 millimetres (1.9 in) wide and 40 mm (1.6 in) long. The first pair of pereiopods (walking legs) carry claws, and the remaining four pairs are flattened with fringed edges. This contrasts with other members of the family Portunidae, which have only the last pair of legs adapted for swimming. P. henslowii is red-brown on the upper surface, and paler beneath.

== Distribution ==
Polybius henslowii is found in the northeast Atlantic Ocean from the British Isles to Morocco, and in the western Mediterranean Sea. Very abundant swarms have been found along the coasts off Galicia (Spain) and off Portugal. Rare specimens have been caught in the North Sea east of Shetland, and in the Skagerrak. Its range has expanded into the southern North Sea, possibly as a result of climate change. It can be found on sandy or gravelly sediments at depths of up to 500 metres (1,600 ft).

== Ecology and behaviour ==
Polybius henslowii is a capable swimmer and can be found swimming near the ocean surface, where it feeds on a mixture of squid, fish, and other crustaceans, including specimens of the same species. P. henslowii has been observed to form pelagic swarms. These swarms are mostly composed of females, excluding that aggregations are for mating, while they might be related to feeding. When they swim inshore, along the coastal upwelling areas of Galicia (NW Spain), they rely more on benthic prey, such as polychaetes and detritus and are influenced by terrestrial organic matter coming from the rivers.

In Galicia (NW Spain), P. henslowii is an important food source for the yellow-legged gull, Larus michahellis. In summer, loggerhead turtles (Caretta caretta) off North Africa feed almost exclusively on P. henslowii.

== Taxonomy ==
Polybius henslowii was first described by William Elford Leach in 1820, originally as the only species in his new genus Polybius. The genus name "Polybius" may be in reference to the Greek historian Polybius; the specific epithet henslowii honours John Stevens Henslow, Professor of Botany at Cambridge University, who had collected the specimens used by Leach from a herring fisherman in North Devon in 1817. This was the first of several species that were named in Henslow's honour. Common names for the species include "sardine swimming crab" and "Henslow's swimming crab".
