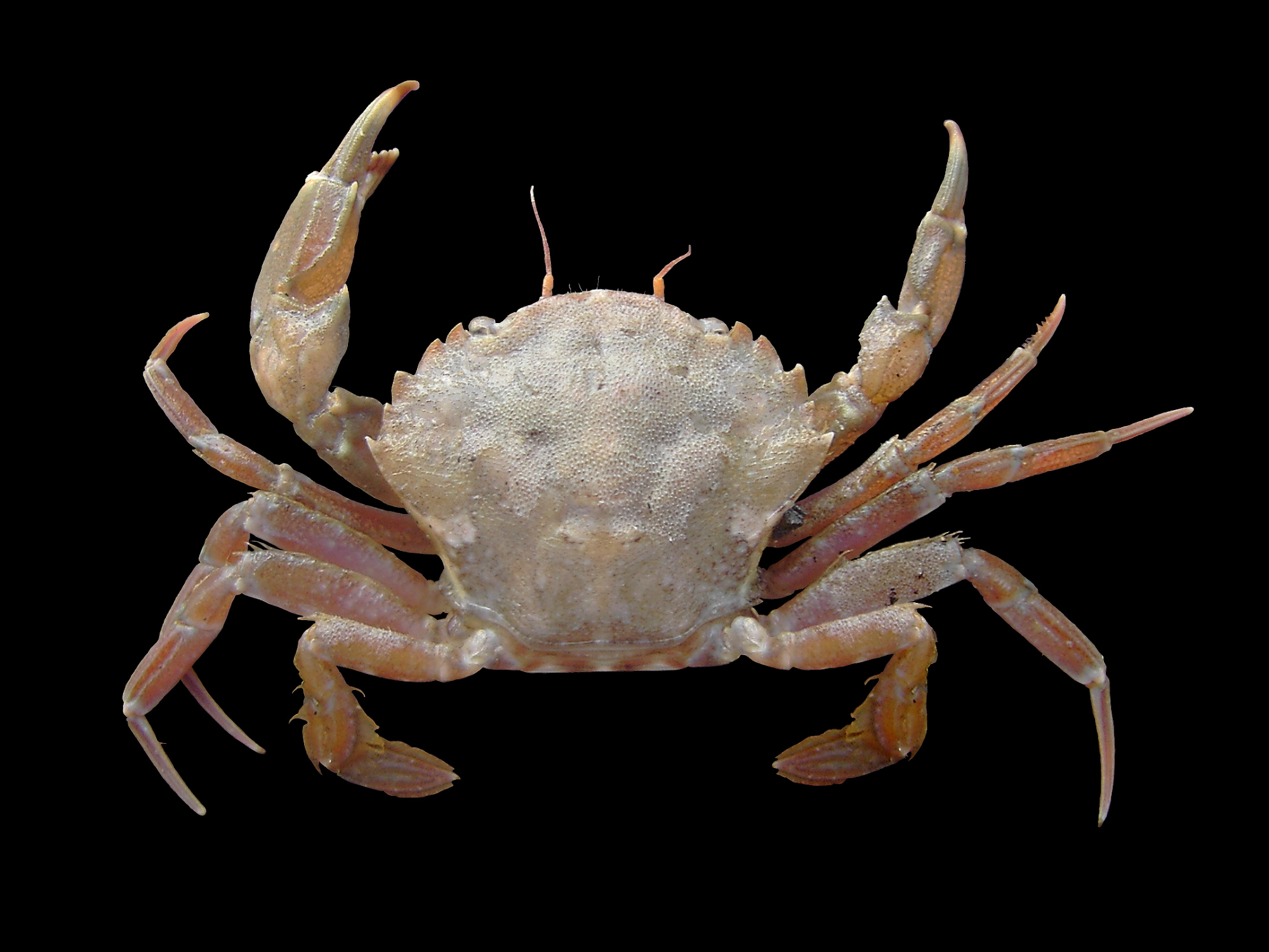

Scientific classification
- Domain: Eukaryota
- Kingdom: Animalia
- Phylum: Arthropoda
- Class: Malacostraca
- Order: Decapoda
- Suborder: Pleocyemata
- Infraorder: Brachyura
- Family: Polybiidae
- Genus: Polybius
- Species: P. navigator

Binomial name
- Polybius navigator (Herbst, 1794)

Synonyms
- Cancer depuratoides Nardo, 1847; Cancer navigator Herbst 1794; Liocarcinus arcuatus (Leach, 1814); Liocarcinus navigator (Herbst, 1794); Marcopipus arcuatus (Leach, 1814); Polybius arcuatus (Leach, 1814); Portunus arcuatus Leach, 1814; Portunus emarginatus Leach, 1814; Portunus guttatus Risso, 1816

= Polybius navigator =

Species of crab

Polybius navigator is a species of crab in the family Polybiidae.

== Distribution ==
Polybius navigator is found chiefly around the British Isles; its range covers the northeast Atlantic Ocean, including the North Sea as far north as Trøndelag in Norway, and as far south as Mauritania, and it also occurs in the Mediterranean Sea.

== Description ==
Polybius navigator has a dark brown carapace up to approximately 33 millimetres (1.3 in) wide, with lighter pereiopods. The frontal margin of the carapace, between the eyes, has a fringe of hair but no spines.

== Subspecies ==
Two subspecies are recognised:

- Polybius navigator navigator (Herbst, 1794)
- Polybius navigator rondeletii (Risso, 1816)
