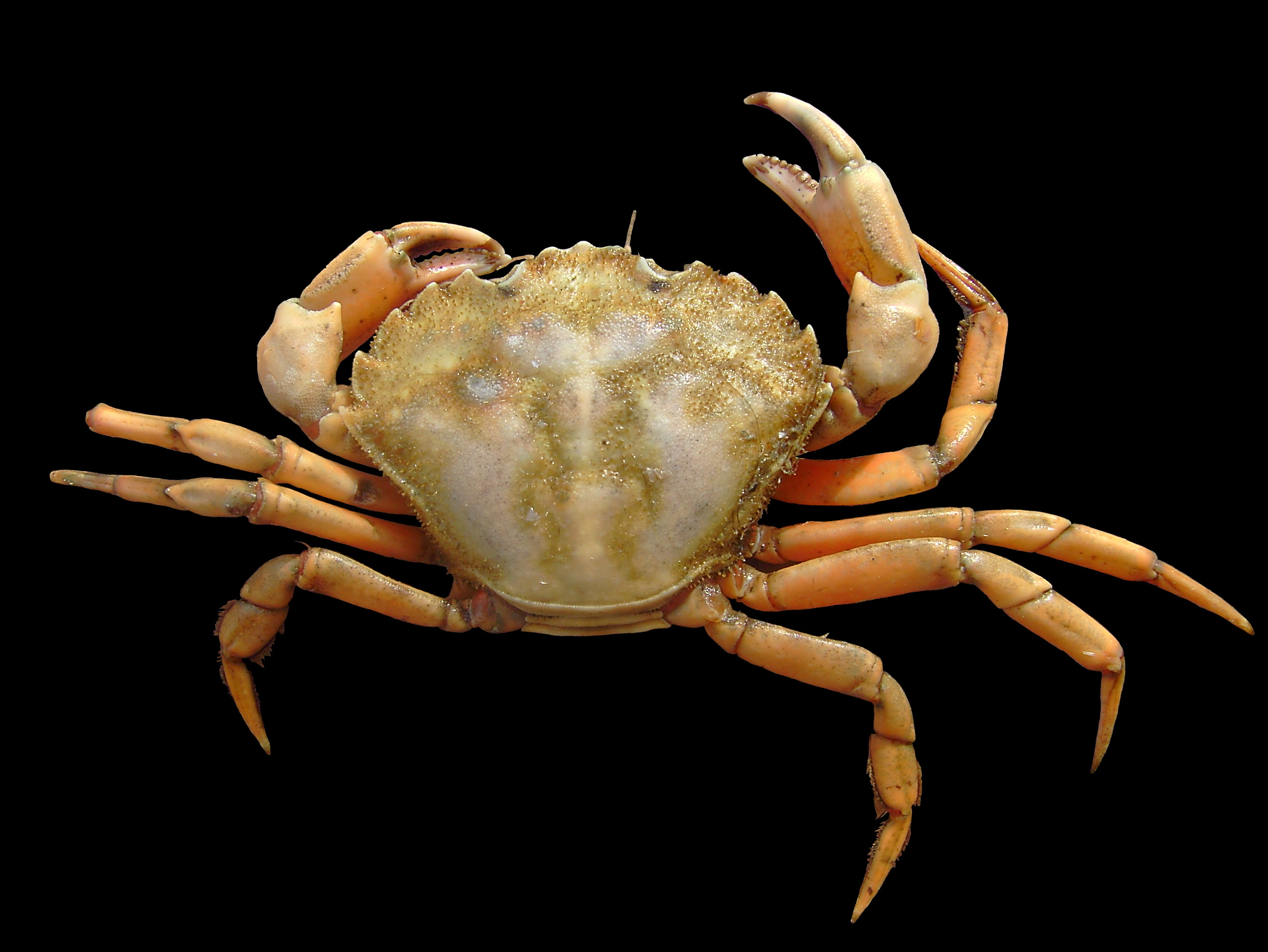
- Carcinus maenas
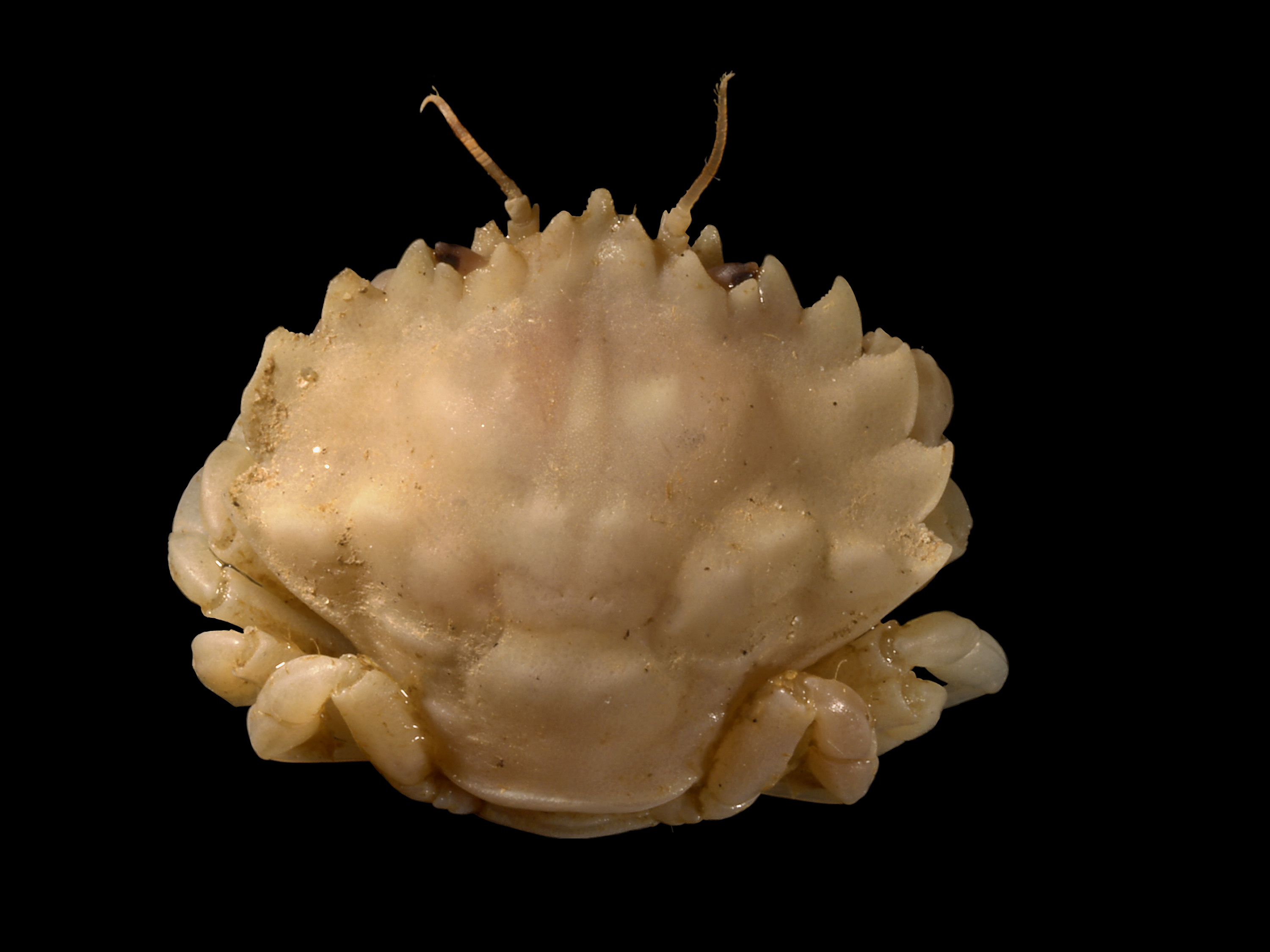
- Pirimela denticulata

Scientific classification
- Domain: Eukaryota
- Kingdom: Animalia
- Phylum: Arthropoda
- Class: Malacostraca
- Order: Decapoda
- Suborder: Pleocyemata
- Infraorder: Brachyura
- Superfamily: Portunoidea
- Family: Carcinidae; MacLeay, 1838

= Carcinidae =

Family of crabs

Carcinidae is a family of crabs belonging to the order Decapoda. It has four subfamilies, including Pirimelinae which was previously treated as a family.

== Taxonomy ==
The family as currently circumscribed includes four subfamilies and eight genera, six with living members and two known only through fossils:

- Subfamily Carcininae MacLeay, 1838
  - Carcinus Leach, 1814
  - †Miopipus Müller, 1984
- Subfamily Parathranitiinae Spiridonov, 2020
  - Parathranites Miers, 1886
- Subfamily Pirimelinae Alcock, 1899
  - Pirimela Leach, 1816
  - Sirpus Gordon, 1953
- Subfamily Platyonichinae Dana, 1851
  - Portumnus Leach, 1814
  - Xaiva MacLeay, 1838
