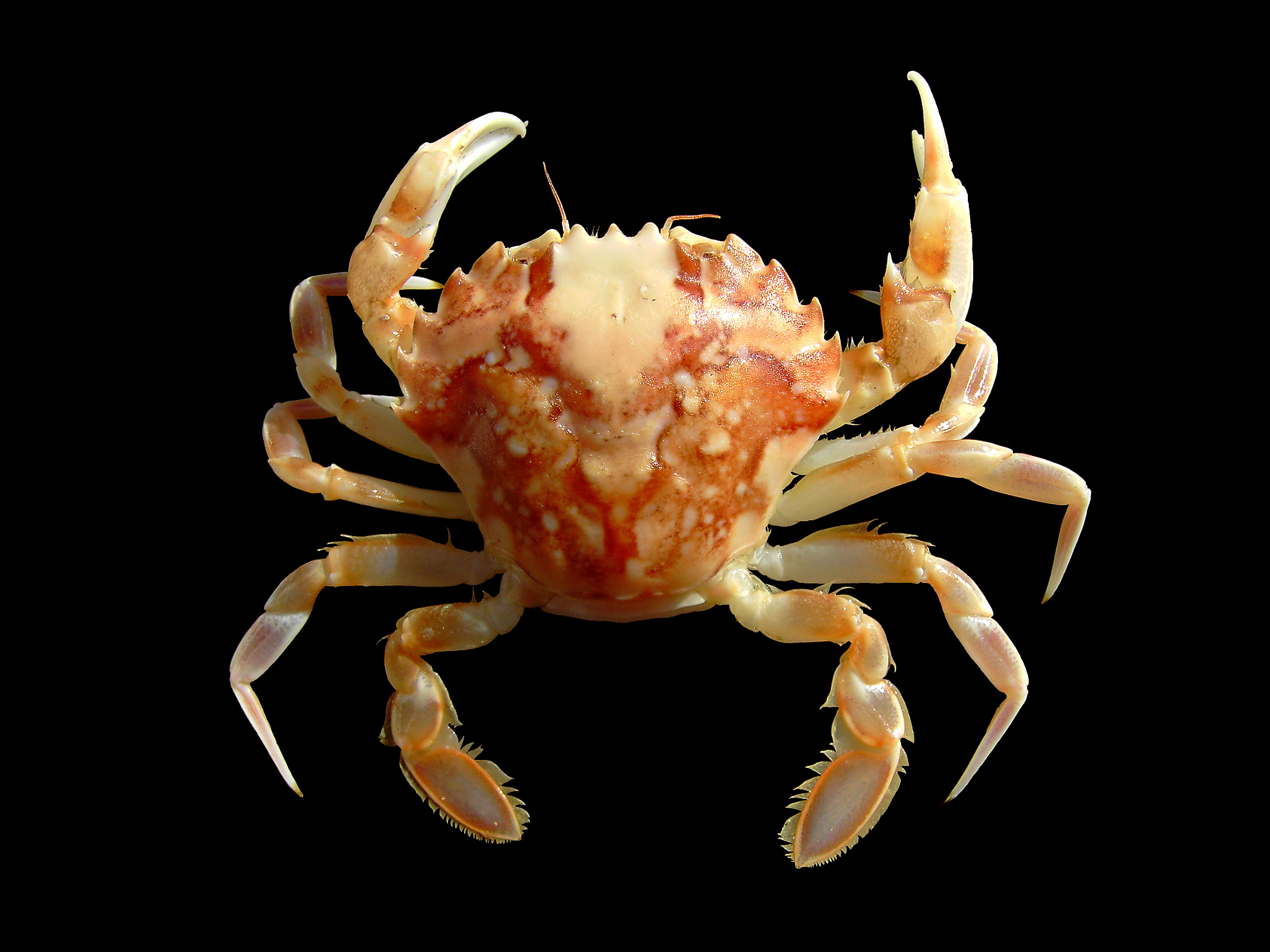

Scientific classification
- Domain: Eukaryota
- Kingdom: Animalia
- Phylum: Arthropoda
- Class: Malacostraca
- Order: Decapoda
- Suborder: Pleocyemata
- Infraorder: Brachyura
- Family: Polybiidae
- Genus: Polybius
- Species: P. marmoreus

Binomial name
- Polybius marmoreus (Leach, 1814)

Synonyms
- Portunus marmoreus Leach, 1814; Liocarcinus marmoreus (Leach, 1814); Macropipus marmoreus (Leach, 1814); Polybius marmoreus (Leach, 1814)

= Polybius marmoreus =

Species of crab

Polybius marmoreus, sometimes known as the marbled swimming crab, is a species of crab found in the northern Atlantic Ocean, including the Mediterranean Sea and North Sea. It may be found on sand and gravel in the sublittoral and lower littoral zones, down to a depth of 84 metres (276 ft), from the Azores and the Alboran Sea (the westernmost section of the Mediterranean Sea) as far north as the Shetland Islands. It reaches a carapace length of 35 millimetres (1.4 in), and is distinguished from other similar species by the presence of three similarly sized teeth on the edge of the carapace, between the eyes, and by the marbled colouration on the carapace. P. marmoreus is sometimes parasitised by the barnacle Sacculina.
