= Eurynome aspera =

Scientific classification
- Kingdom: Animalia
- Phylum: Arthropoda
- Clade: Pancrustacea
- Class: Malacostraca
- Order: Decapoda
- Suborder: Pleocyemata
- Infraorder: Brachyura
- Family: Majidae
- Genus: Eurynome
- Species: E. aspera

Binomial name
- Eurynome aspera (Pennant, 1777)

Species of crab

Eurynome aspera, the strawberry crab, is a species of crab in the family Majidae.It is small (1–2 cm) and sometimes a vague strawberry colour. The carapace and legs are often encrusted with algae and mud which act as camouflage.

== Range ==
The East Atlantic, Mediterranean Sea and South Africa.

== Description ==
The rostrum is bipartite, forming a double point. The two points are widely separated, each broad at the base and tapering forwards. The postorbital spine is laterally expanded and the antorbital spine is absent. Many areas of the carapace have tubercles. The second and third peduncular segments of the antenna are broad and the eyestalks retract. The chelipeds are equal in size and those of the female are shorter and less developed than in the male. The body and legs are pale red to brown, occasionally blue-grey, and the tubercles (warts) are white or brown. This species has been confused with Eurynome spinosa See Hartnoll, 1961 (references),

== Habitat ==
Depth range - lower shore to 180 metres.
