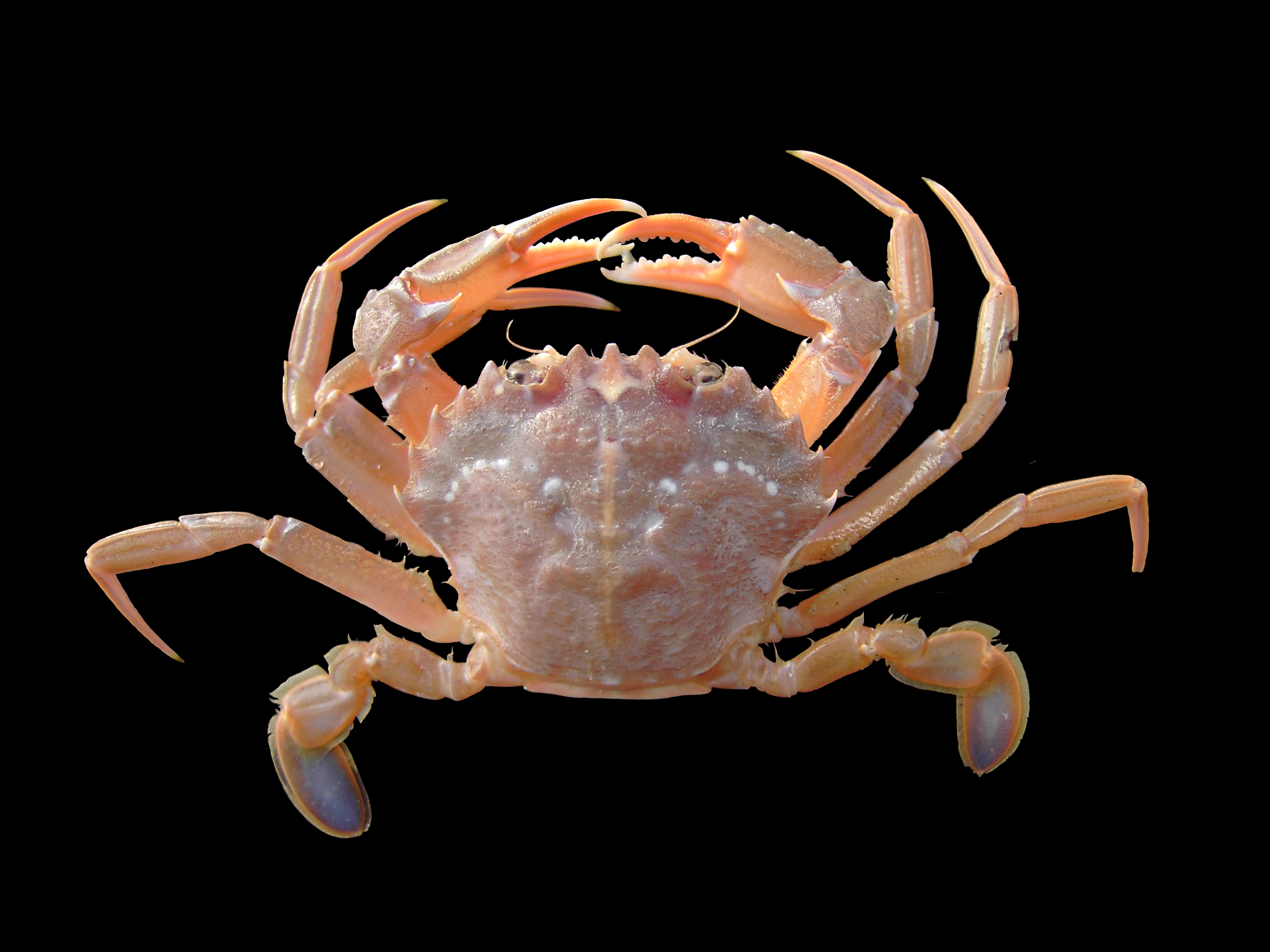
- Adult L. depurator
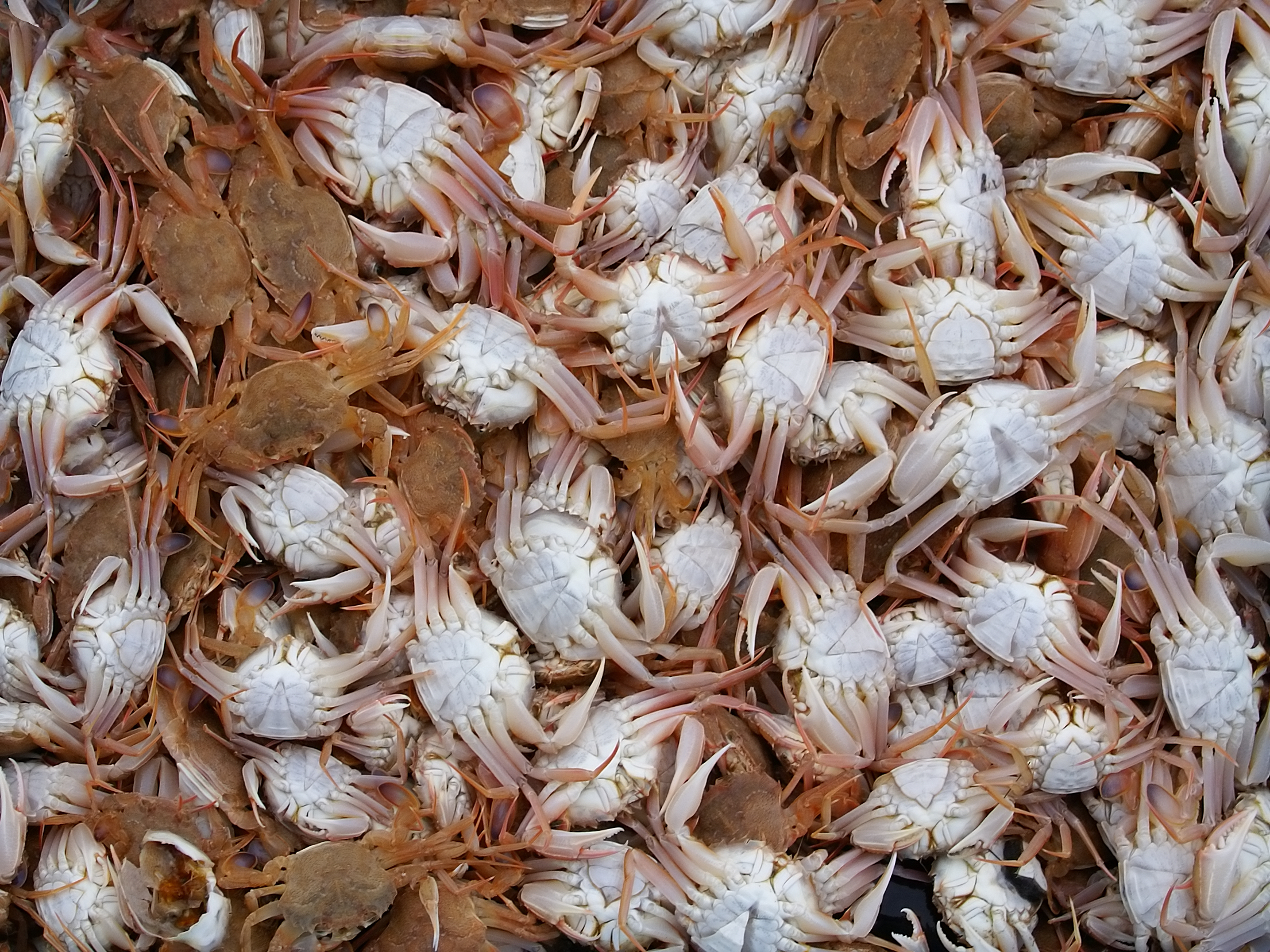
- L. depurator for sale at a market

Scientific classification
- Kingdom: Animalia
- Phylum: Arthropoda
- Class: Malacostraca
- Order: Decapoda
- Suborder: Pleocyemata
- Infraorder: Brachyura
- Superfamily: Portunoidea
- Family: Polybiidae
- Genus: Polybius
- Species: P. depurator

Binomial name
- Polybius depurator (Linnaeus, 1758)

Synonyms
- Portunus plicatus Risso, 1816

= Polybius depurator =

Species of crab

Polybius depurator, sometimes called the harbour crab or sandy swimming crab, is a species of crab found in the North Sea, Atlantic Ocean, Mediterranean Sea, and Black Sea. It grows up to 50 millimetres (2.0 in) in width and 40 mm (1.6 in) long, and can be distinguished from other crabs, such as the shore crab Carcinus maenas, by the curved rows of white spots on its carapace.

The species was first described by Carl Linnaeus in 1758, in his 10th edition of Systema Naturae. It has a synonym, Portunus plicatus, which was given by Antoine Risso in 1816.

The females in this species reach maturity within their first year of life. They reach their peak of reproduction during the winter time in the Mediterranean.
