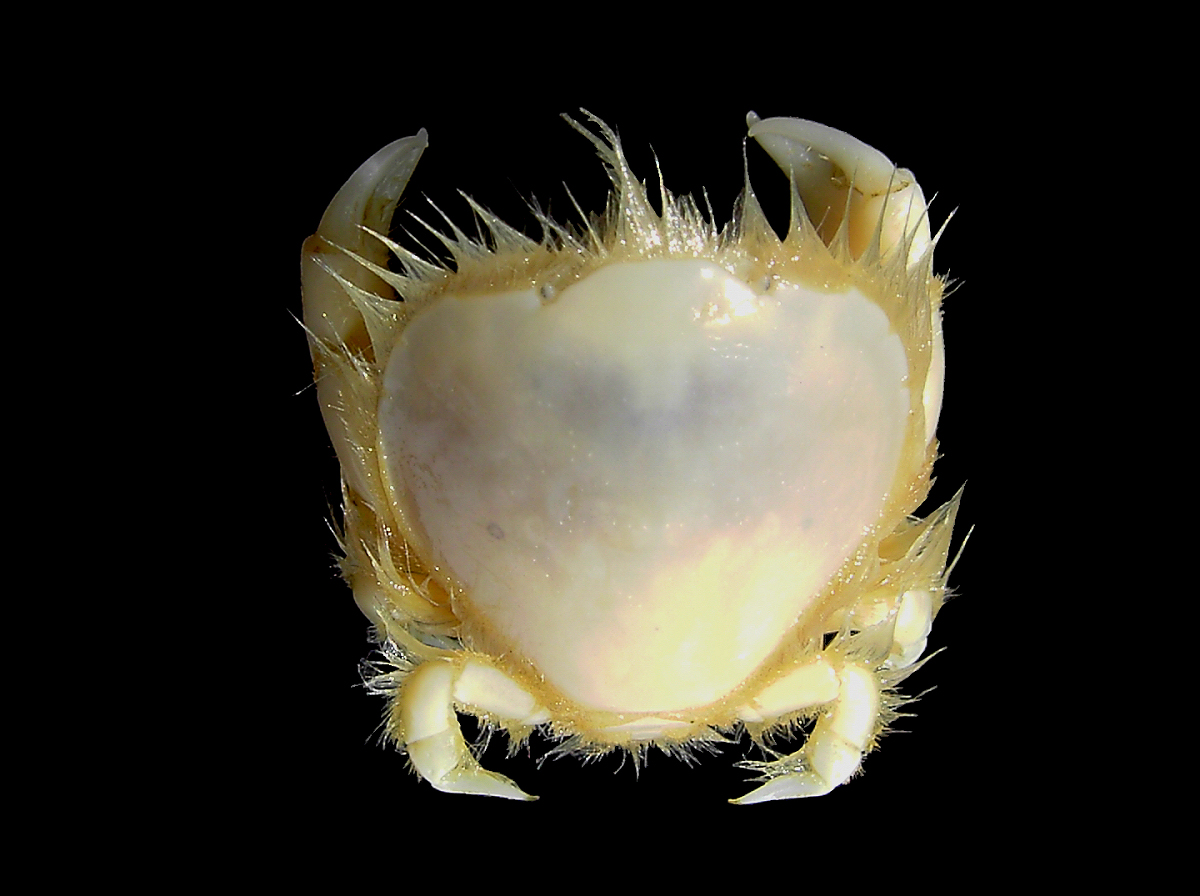

Scientific classification
- Domain: Eukaryota
- Kingdom: Animalia
- Phylum: Arthropoda
- Class: Malacostraca
- Order: Decapoda
- Suborder: Pleocyemata
- Infraorder: Brachyura
- Family: Thiidae
- Genus: Thia; Leach, 1815
- Species: T. scutellata

Binomial name
- Thia scutellata (Fabricius, 1793)

Synonyms
- Cancer residuus Herbst, 1799; Thia polita Leach, 1815; Thia blainvillii Risso, 1822

= Thumbnail crab =

Species of crab

The thumbnail crab, Thia scutellata, is a species of decapods, in the family of thiidae, whose carapace resembles a human thumbnail, a dense fringe of long hairs distinctly notched around the edge. Pale pink in colour with red to brown markings. It is found in the North Sea, north-east Atlantic and Mediterranean Sea. It is the only extant species in the genus Thia, although two fossil species are known. Their predators includes the atlantic cod.
