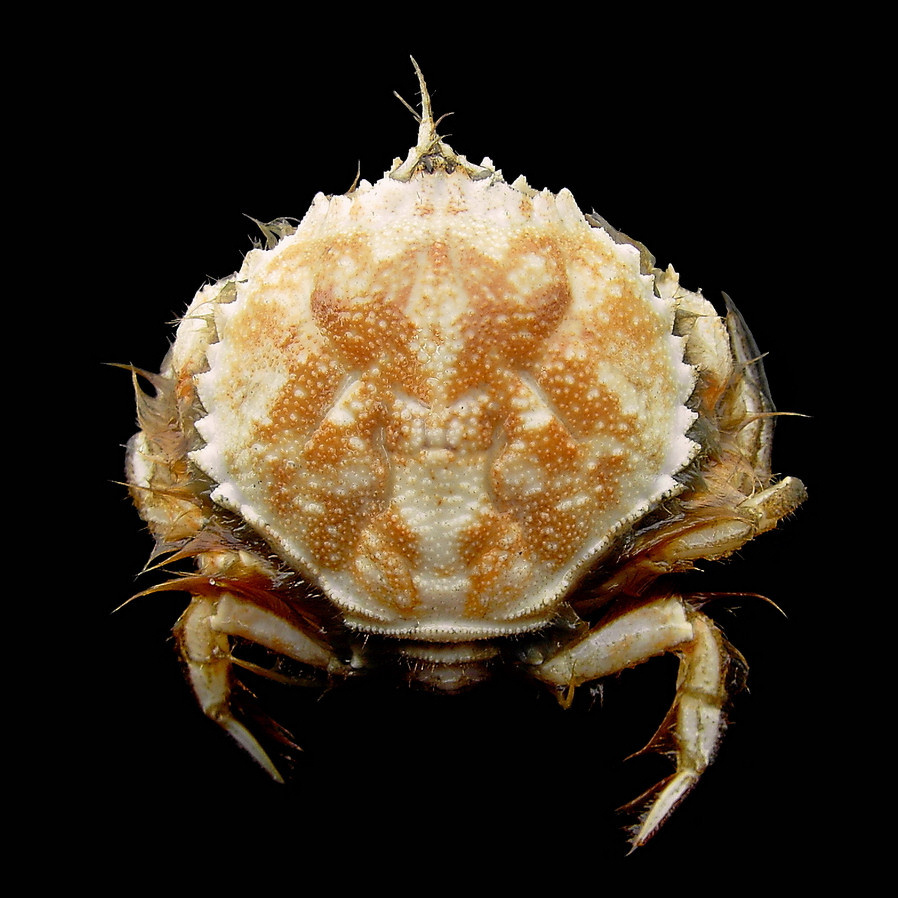

Scientific classification
- Kingdom: Animalia
- Phylum: Arthropoda
- Class: Malacostraca
- Order: Decapoda
- Suborder: Pleocyemata
- Infraorder: Brachyura
- Family: Atelecyclidae
- Genus: Atelecyclus
- Species: A. rotundatus

Binomial name
- Atelecyclus rotundatus (Olivi, 1792)

Synonyms
- Cancer rotundatus Olivi, 1792; Cancer septemdentatus Montagu, 1813; Atelecyclus heterodon Leach, 1815

= Atelecyclus rotundatus =

Species of crab

Atelecyclus rotundatus is a medium-sized crab found on the west coast of Europe and Africa as well as almost all the Mediterranean Sea and on the Cape Verde and Canary islands. It has many common names, including circular crab, round crab and old man's face crab. It measures about 40 millimetres (1.6 in) across its almost circular, reddish-brown carapace and lives on coarse soft bottoms at shallow depths. There are 9–11 sharp teeth on the front and 3 teeth between the eyes.

This crab is sometimes mistaken for the more common Atelecyclus undecimdentatus. However, Atelecyclus undecimdentatus can be distinguished by its wider carapace and coarser granulations.
