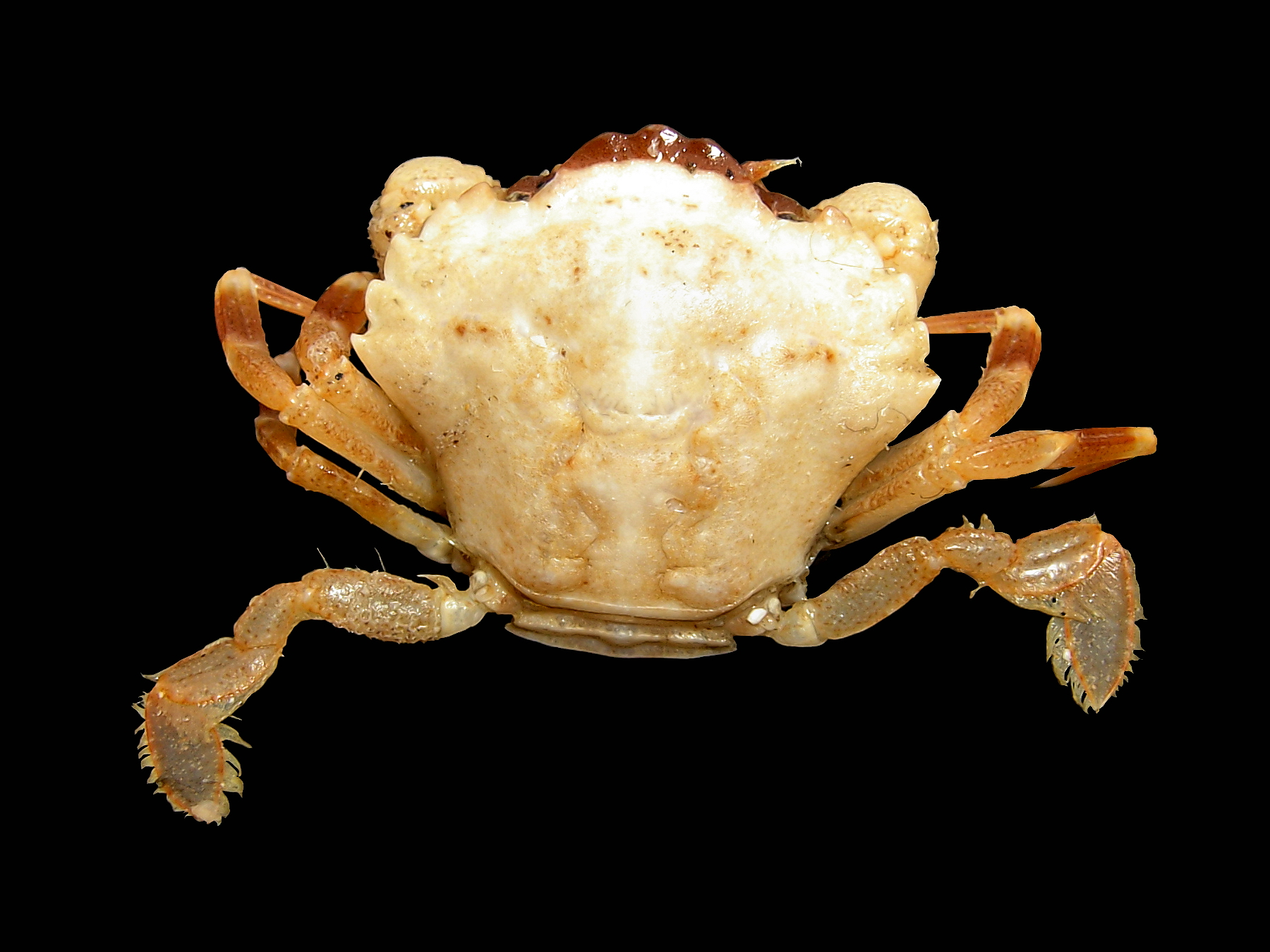

Scientific classification
- Domain: Eukaryota
- Kingdom: Animalia
- Phylum: Arthropoda
- Class: Malacostraca
- Order: Decapoda
- Suborder: Pleocyemata
- Infraorder: Brachyura
- Family: Polybiidae
- Genus: Polybius
- Species: P. pusillus

Binomial name
- Polybius pusillus (Leach, 1815)

Synonyms
- Liocarcinus pusillus (Leach, 1816); Macropipus parvulus (Parisi, 1916) Macropipus pusillus (Leach, 1816); Portunus parvulus (Parisi, 1916) Portunus pusillus (Leach, 1816)

= Polybius pusillus =

Species of crab

Polybius pusillus, common name dwarf swimming crab, is a species of crab in the Portunidae family.

== Description ==
Polybius pusillus is a small, colourful species with a broad, suboval carapace having a maximum width of 25 mm (1.0 in). However, most specimens are usually less than 20 mm (0.8 in). This species occurs in a wide range of colours. The front has three sharpened tusks, directed forward.

== Distribution ==
Polybius pusillus occurs from North-West Africa, to Lofoten, Norway including the North Sea. It is found around the shores of: England, in such places as Northumberland, Yorkshire, The Wash, Thames, the eastern English Channel, Isle of Wight, Portland, Plymouth, the Scilly Isles, the Bristol Channel, Liverpool Bay; Scotland - Shetland, Orkney, Firth of Forth, Argyll and Clyde, The Minch; Ireland, occurring in and around Dublin, Belfast, County Mayo, Galway Bay, Fastnet Rock, County Cork; and elsewhere in the British Isles including the Channel Islands, Anglesey and the Isle of Man.

== Habitat ==
Specimens range intertidally up to 100 metres, dwelling on sandy to stony bottoms, but prefer gravel or stony substrates.
