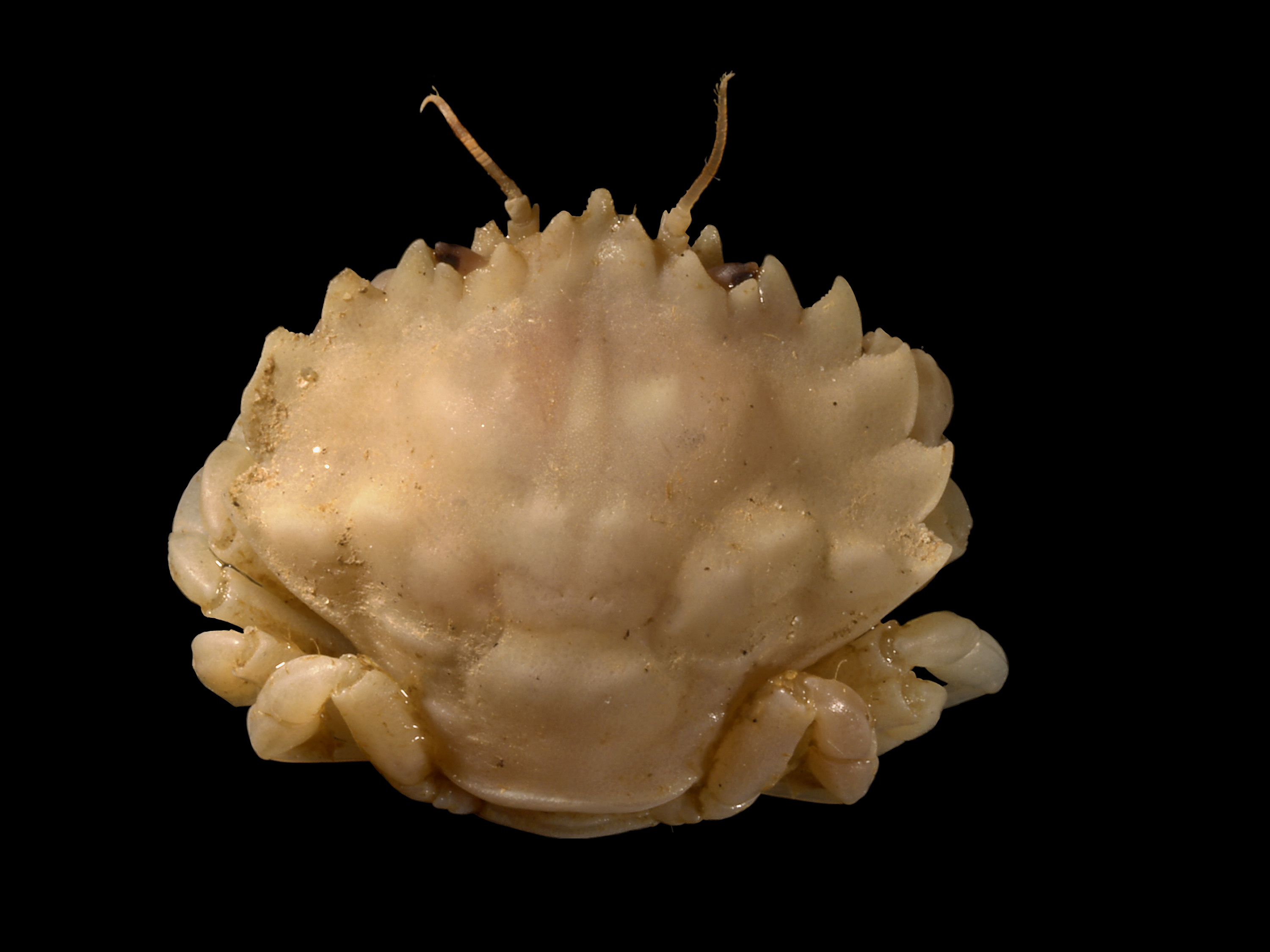
- Pirimela denticulata

Scientific classification
- Domain: Eukaryota
- Kingdom: Animalia
- Phylum: Arthropoda
- Class: Malacostraca
- Order: Decapoda
- Suborder: Pleocyemata
- Infraorder: Brachyura
- Family: Carcinidae
- Subfamily: Pirimelinae

= Pirimelinae =

Subfamily of crabs

Pirimelinae is a subfamily of crabs belonging to the family Carcinidae in the order Decapoda. It previously was treated as a family.

== Genera ==
Extant genera:

- Pirimela Leach, 1816
- Sirpus Gordon, 1953

Extinct genera:

- †Parapirimela Van Straelen, 1937
- †Pliopirimela Van Bakel, Jagt, Fraaije & Willie, 2003
- †Trachypirimela Müller, 1974
