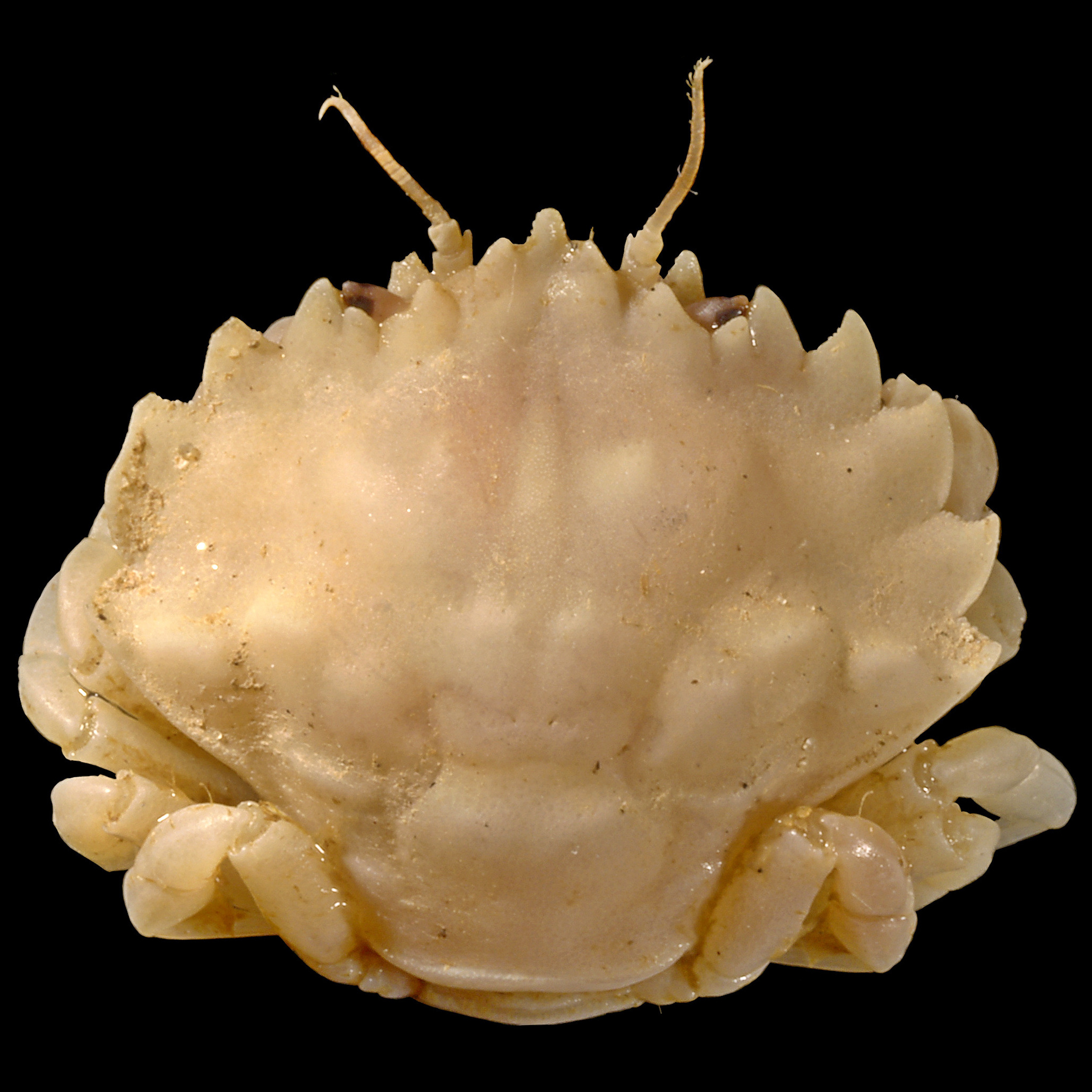

Scientific classification
- Domain: Eukaryota
- Kingdom: Animalia
- Phylum: Arthropoda
- Class: Malacostraca
- Order: Decapoda
- Suborder: Pleocyemata
- Infraorder: Brachyura
- Family: Carcinidae
- Genus: Pirimela; Leach, 1816
- Species: P. denticulata

Binomial name
- Pirimela denticulata (Montagu, 1808)

Synonyms
- Cancer denticulata Montagu, 1808; Pirimela princeps Hope, 1851

= Pirimela =

Genus of crabs

Pirimela is a genus of crab containing a single species, Pirimela denticulata.

== Description ==
Pirimela denticulata is a "small, pretty crab", up to 12 mm (0.5 in) long and 15 mm (0.6 in) across the carapace. Its colouring is mostly green, with mottling of brown, purple or red. The front edge of the carapace has three teeth between the eyes, two teeth around the orbits of the eyes and five teeth along either side.

== Distribution and ecology ==
Pirimela denticulata is found from the British Isles to Mauritania, the Mediterranean Sea, the Canary Islands, the Cape Verde Islands, and the Azores. It lives in burrows in sandy sediments, or on underwater vegetation, at depths of up to 250 m (820 ft).

== Taxonomy ==
Pirimela denticulata was first described by George Montagu in 1808, under the name Cancer denticulata. It was later transferred by William Elford Leach to his new genus Pirimela, which contains only P. denticulata. A second species of Pirimela, P. princeps, is now considered to be synonymous with P. denticulata.
