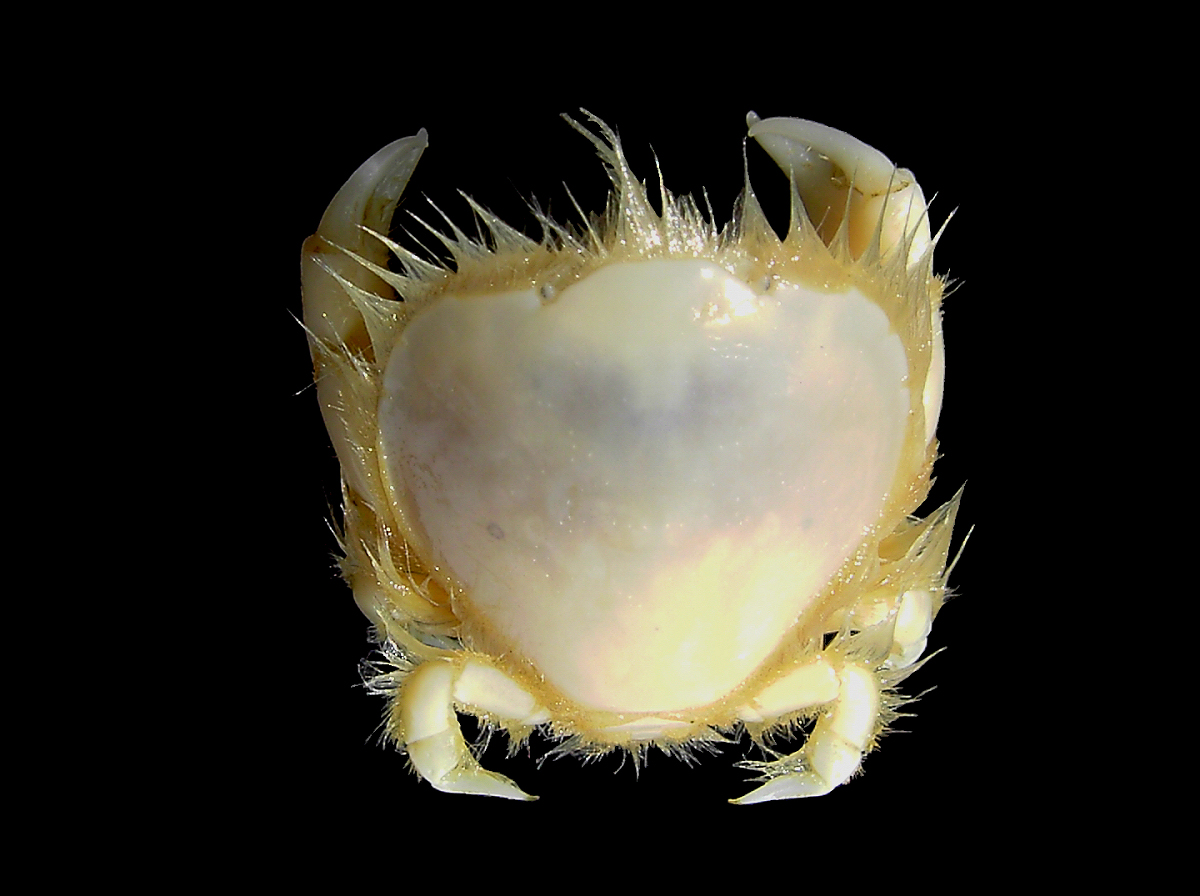
- Thia scutellata

Scientific classification
- Domain: Eukaryota
- Kingdom: Animalia
- Phylum: Arthropoda
- Class: Malacostraca
- Order: Decapoda
- Suborder: Pleocyemata
- Infraorder: Brachyura
- Superfamily: Portunoidea
- Family: Thiidae

= Thiidae =

Family of crabs

Thiidae is a family of crabs in the crustacean order Decapoda.

== Genera ==
The family contains two genera in two subfamilies:

- Subfamily Nautilocorystinae Ortmann, 1893
  - Nautilocorystes Milne Edwards, 1837
- Subfamily Thiinae Dana, 1852
  - Thia Leach, 1815
