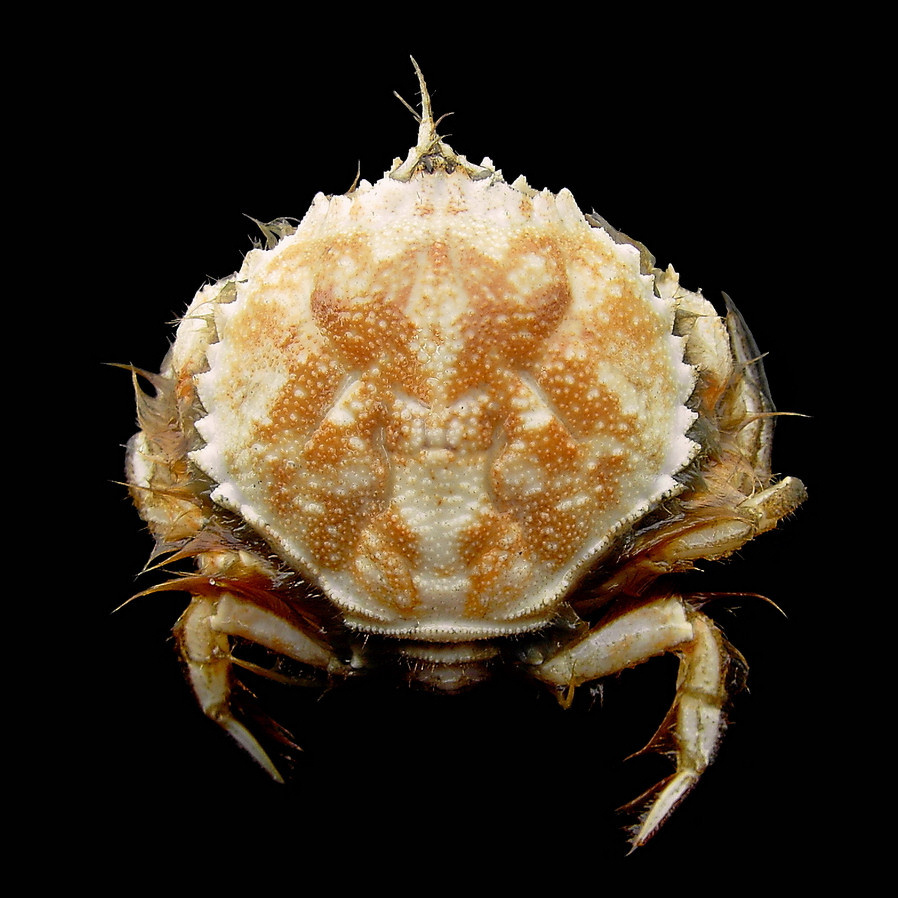
- Atelecyclus rotundatus

Scientific classification
- Kingdom: Animalia
- Phylum: Arthropoda
- Clade: Pancrustacea
- Class: Malacostraca
- Order: Decapoda
- Suborder: Pleocyemata
- Infraorder: Brachyura
- Superfamily: Cancroidea
- Family: Atelecyclidae; Ortmann, 1893

= Atelecyclidae =

Family of crabs

Atelecyclidae is a family of crabs belonging to the superfamily Cancroidea, and currently contains eight genera of which two are extinct. However, the genera other than Atelecyclus and Pseudocorystes do not belong in the Cancroidea, and are to be removed from the family.

- Atelecyclus
- † Levicyclus
- † Palaeotrichia
- Peltarion
- Podocatactes
- Pseudocorystes
- Protopeltarion
- Trichopeltarion
