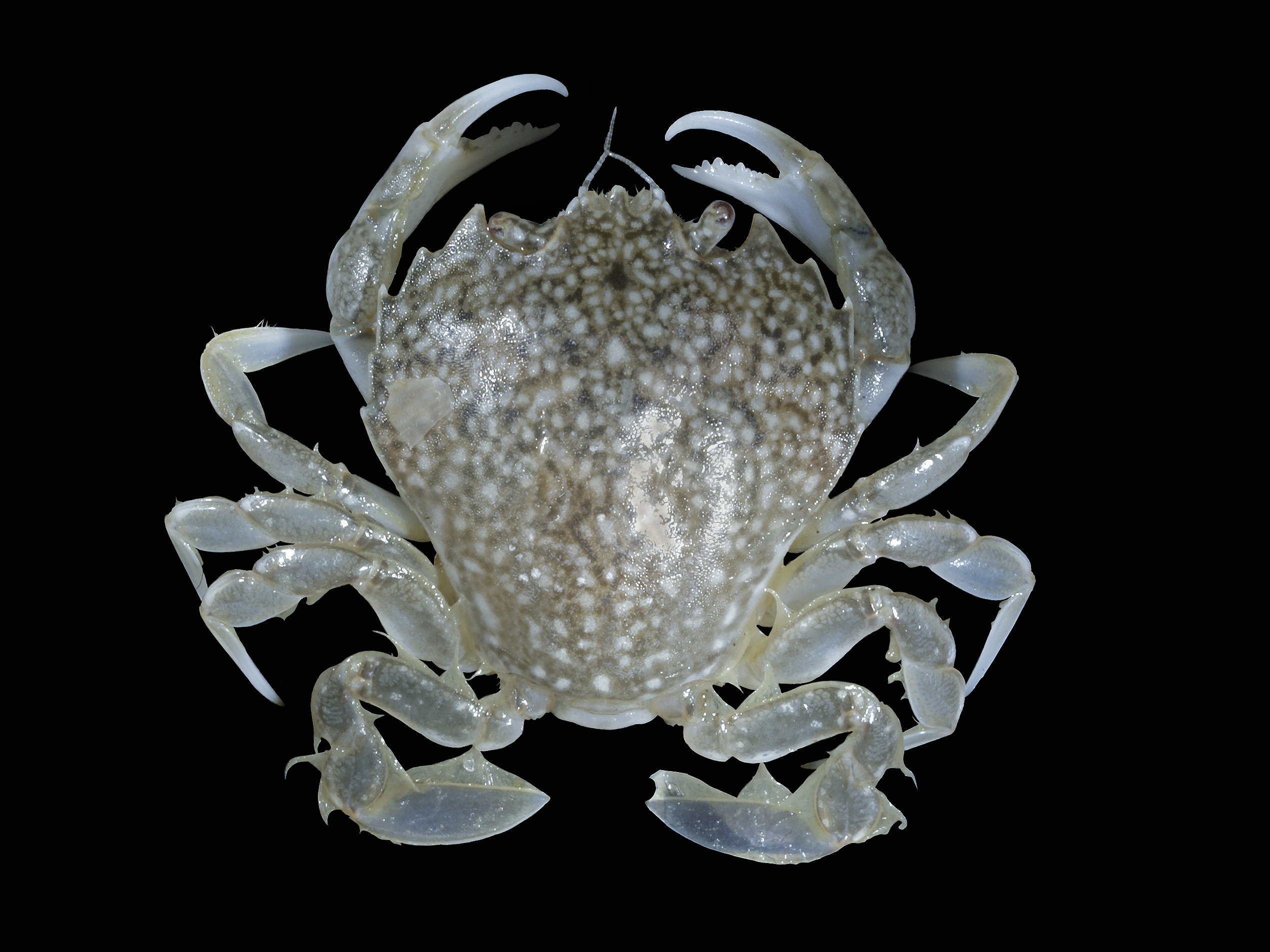
- Portumnus latipes of the Portunidae

Scientific classification
- Kingdom: Animalia
- Phylum: Arthropoda
- Clade: Pancrustacea
- Class: Malacostraca
- Order: Decapoda
- Suborder: Pleocyemata
- Infraorder: Brachyura
- Subsection: Heterotremata
- Superfamily: Portunoidea; Rafinesque, 1815

= Portunoidea =

Superfamily of crabs

Portunoidea is a superfamily of crabs that includes the family Portunidae, the swimming crabs. Which other crab families are also placed here is a matter of some contention, and may be revised following molecular phylogenetic analyses.

== Description ==
Their rather flat and smooth carapace is usually wider than long and of hexagonal, subhexagonal, rectangular, or transversely ovate shape. It is usually widest between the hindmost spines of the forward rim; there may be up to 9 pairs of these spines, with a few smaller ones right above the head, but they are missing altogether in some species.

In some, the first maxilliped's endopod is lobed, forming the characteristic portunid lobe. The chelipeds are usually robust, and in some the last pereiopod pair has ovate dactyls. The sutures of the sternum between segments 4 to 8 are usually incomplete, and in the Portunidae, the eighth sternite is usually visible if seen from below and has a penial groove.

In males, the abdominal somites are either all free or the third to fifth are fused, often retaining the sutures though. The first gonopod is strongly curved, with a swollen and strongly hooked base.

== Classification ==
Portunoidea are close relatives of the Xanthoidea, and the families Hexapodidae and Mathildellidae, usually included there, are sometimes placed in the Portunoidea, while the deep-sea crabs (Geryonidae) are usually placed in the Portunoidea but sometimes in the Xanthoidea. All Portunoidea live in the ocean, although the family Trichodactylidae, sometimes included here, live in fresh water. There are thirteen families in the superfamily Portunoidea, four of which are extinct:

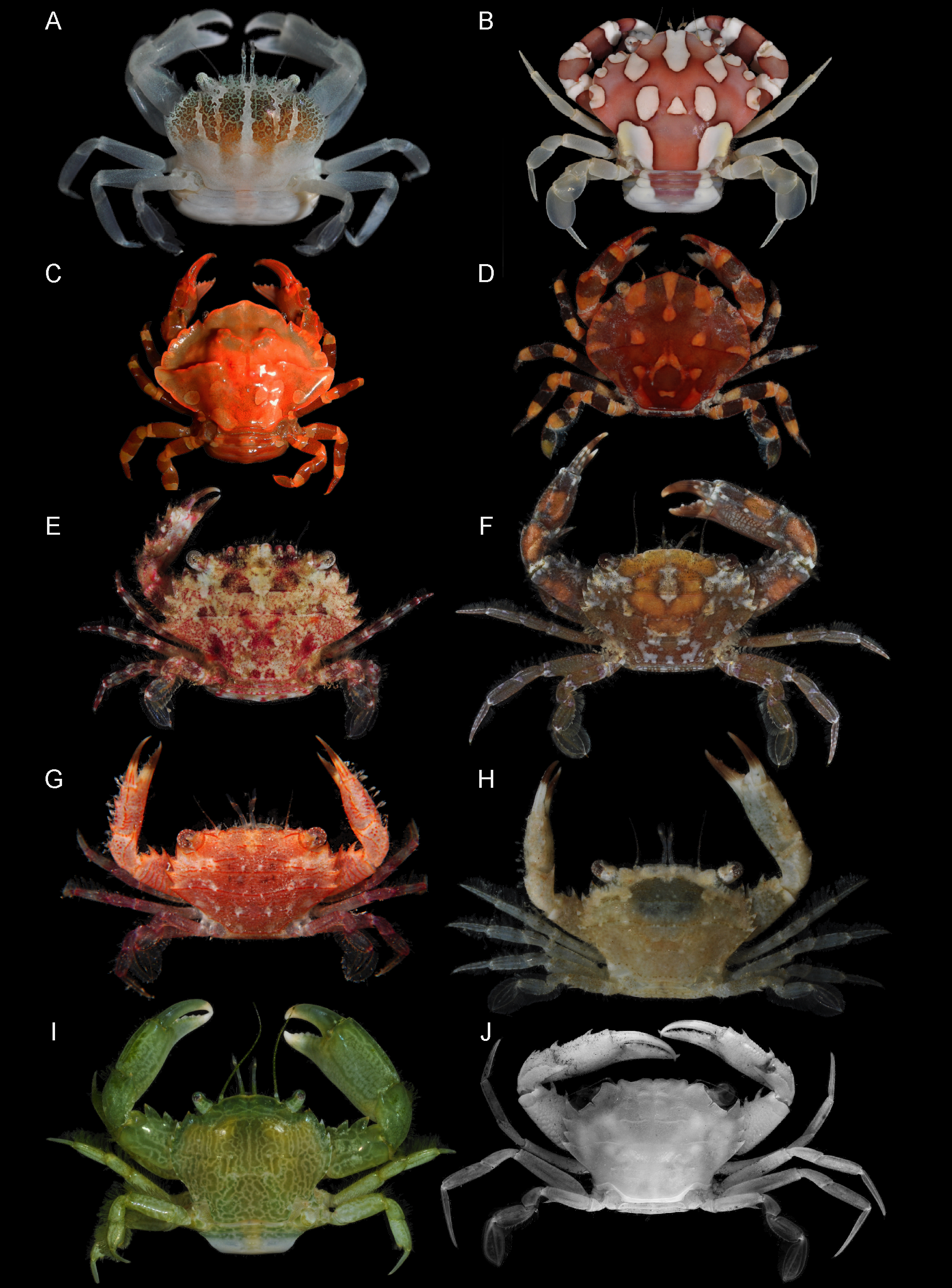
Representative putative symbiotic Thalamitinae species

- Brusiniidae Števčić, 1991
- † Carcineretidae Beurlen, 1930
- Carcinidae MacLeay, 1838
- Geryonidae Colosi, 1924
- † Litophylacidae Van Straelen, 1936
- † Longusorbiidae Karasawa, Schweitzer & Feldmann, 2008
- Nautilocorystidae Ortmann, 1893
- Ovalipidae Spiridonov, Neretina & Schepetov, 2014
- Pirimelidae Alcock, 1899
- Polybiidae Ortmann, 1893
- Portunidae Rafinesque, 1815
- † Psammocarcinidae Beurlen, 1930
- Thiidae Dana, 1852

It also contains the genus Garthopilumnus.
