= Maurice E. Kressly =

American architect

Maurice E. Kressly (1892–1963) was an American architect practicing in Pennsylvania and central Florida in the middle years of the twentieth century. Kressly was well known as a school architect in both states, as well as for designing romantic Mediterranean Revival and Tudor Revival residences in the Orlando area. While his name appears spelled both "Kressly" and "Kressley" in contemporary texts, the proper spelling is without the second "e".

== Early life and education ==
Maurice Elias Kressly was born in Wilkes-Barre, Pennsylvania, on October 11, 1892, the son of James and Lucinda A. (Martz) Kressly. He was one of a family of six children, five boys and one girl. They grew up in the family home at 100 Hanover Street, Wilkes-Barre. Maurice's father James was a carpenter and contractor. He graduated from high school in his home town in 1910.

Kressly studied architecture at Pennsylvania State University and graduated in the class of 1915. He was a charter member of the Omega Chapter Theta Chi fraternity, at State College, Pennsylvania. Kressly entered the Second Training Company, Coast Artillery Corps, at Fort Monroe, Virginia, and was commissioned first lieutenant. He attained the rank of captain and was assigned to the office of the chief of artillery.

Following service during World War I, Kressly took fourth place in an architectural competition to design a community center building to be built of white pine. In 1918, Kressly was married to Louise V. Madden, of Wilkes-Barre.

== In Pennsylvania ==
Kressly first established his practice in Wilkes-Barre, at 314 South Fourteenth Street. In 1923, Kressly relocated to Harrisburg, Pennsylvania, where he organized the firm of Maurice E. Kressly & Co. His office was located at 212-214 North Third, Harrisburg. For the next several years he specialized in the design of school buildings, including schools that were built at Greensburg, Ridgway and Rockport, Pennsylvania. Kressly also served as an assistant of the School Board Bureau of Pennsylvania.

== In Florida ==
In 1925, Kressly relocated to Orlando, Florida, establishing a practice at 239-240 Church and Main Building; he practiced architecture in Orlando for the next two decades.

Kressly was among no more than a dozen architecture firms active in Orlando in the 1920s, including Ryan and Roberts (Ida Annah Ryan and Isabel Roberts), Frank L. Bodine, Fred E. Field, David Hyer, Murry S. King, George E. Krug, Howard M. Reynolds, Frederick H. Trimble and Percy P. Turner. Each of these architects is notable, and together these firms were supportive colleagues in promoting excellence in the built environment in Florida, as one can learn by reading the links to each.

Two of central Florida's most notable, exuberant, and easily seen Mediterranean Revival-style homes were designed by Kressly. Winter Park's "Casa de la Esquina" (1922), on the corner of Palmer Avenue and Alabama Drive, and College Park's "Casa Alameda" at 754 Seville Place, Orlando. Both homes exhibit the careful attention to massing and detail for which Kressly was known, as well as a theatricality that sets them apart from neighboring homes in the same style. "Casa Alameda" may be ranked high among Kressly's work, which can compare favorably with the designs of his Orlando contemporary, architect James Gamble Rogers II (see for instance Rogers' "Casa Feliz" in Winter Park).

Typical of Kressly's residential work is the home at 1338 Ivanhoe Boulevard; it was built in about 1936 in the Tudor Revival style. An example of Kressly's educational buildings is the St James Cathedral School, 505 Ridgewood Street, Orlando, dating to 1928. The main entrance and details show a Northern Italian Renaissance style. Kressly also designed the Kaley School, 1600 East Kaley Avenue, another Tudor Revival style building, constructed in 1936. His own home in Orlando stood at 752 Palm Dr. W.

In 1942, Kressly left Orlando and joined the Stone & Webster Engineering Corp., 49 Federal St., Boston, Massachusetts.

== Family ==
Kressly married three times. His first wife was Louise V. Madden. They were married on April 27, 1918 and became the parents of two sons, Maurice E. Jr., born in 1922 and Lee L. born in 1923. His second wife was named Ethel Raab. Later in life, in 1951, he married Ruth Elizabeth Mertz. Kressly died in March 1963 in Philadelphia, Pennsylvania.
