= David Hyer =

American architect (1875–1942)

David Burns Hyer
- Born: May 21, 1875; Charleston, South Carolina
- Died: December 11, 1942
- Occupation: American architect

David Burns Hyer (May 21, 1875 – December 11, 1942) was an American architect who practiced in Charleston, South Carolina and Orlando, Florida during the first half of the twentieth century, designing civic buildings in the Neoclassical Revival and Mediterranean Revival styles.

== Biography ==
David Burns Hyer was born on May 21, 1875, in Charleston, South Carolina, the youngest son of James S. Hyer and Ella Payne. Hyer served as a civil engineer at the Charleston Navy Yard and for many Southern railways, before opening his own private architectural practice in Charleston. Hyer’s Charleston office was located in the People's Building.

David Hyer married Sally Yeadon Mazyck, daughter of James Mazyck, in June 1904; they had four children: David B Hyer Jr., Yeadon Mazyck Hyer, Robert Payne Hyer and Helen Hyer

Active in Charleston (see partial list of works below) Hyer was a member of the South Carolina Chapter of the American Institute of Architects (AIA). By the early 1920s the Hyers established a home in Orlando. Hyer worked in association with Daytona and Winter Park architect John Arthur Rogers (father of architect James Gamble Rogers II); he also listed his architectural business in the Orlando city directories. As such, it was one of only 10 architectural firms listed in 1926, the others including: Frank L. Bodine, Fred E. Field, Murry S. King, Maurice E. Kressly, George E. Krug, Howard M. Reynolds, Frederick H. Trimble. Ryan and Roberts (Ida Annah Ryan and Isabel Roberts) and Percy P. Turner. It was one of 12 firms so listed in Orlando in 1927. During the 1920s Hyer maintained Orlando offices first in the Rose Building and later in the Phillips Block on South Orange Avenue.

Hyer's best and most visible Orlando work is the Grace Phillips Johnson Estate on Edgewater Drive. The grand Mediterranean Revival home is on a narrow isthmus between Lake Adair and Lake Concord, with sweeping views across Lake Concord to downtown Orlando. The house once had three murals by Florida artist Sam Stoltz, only one remains, a peacock.

James Gamble Rogers II managed David B. Hyer's Orlando office in 1934; by 1935 Hyer had moved back to Charleston permanently. Hyer continued to practice architecture in South Carolina as late as 1941. Hyer died on December 11, 1942, in Charleston, South Carolina.

== Architectural Work – Partial Listing ==
- 57 and 59 Gibbes St., Charleston SC - 1915
- Garden Theater, 371 King Street, Charleston, SC – C. K. Howell and D. B. Hyer - 1918
- Y.W.C.A., Charleston, SC - 1918
- Buist School, 103 Calhoun Street, Charleston, SC - 1920
- W.T. Grant & Co. building, 265-267 King St. - 1920
- Charleston High School, Charleston, SC - 1921
- St. Barnabas Lutheran Church, 45 Moultrie Street, Charleston, SC – 1922
- King Street Apartments, Charleston, SC (County Hall) - 1922
- First National Bank Building, Holly Hill, SC - 1922
- Trustees School, North Charleston, SC - 1922
- Andrew B. Murray Vocational School, 3 Chisolm Street, Charleston, SC - 1923
- Grace Protestant Episcopal Church, 98 Wentworth Street, Charleston, SC - 1923
- Charleston Heights Baptist Church - 1923
- Winyah Indigo School, Georgetown, SC - 1924
- Charleston Country Club, Charleston, SC - 1925 (as associate architect with Parsons & Co. of Boston, MA)
- Pounds Motor Company Building, 162 W. Plant St., Winter Garden, FL - 1925
- Grace Phillips Johnson Estate; 1005 Edgewater Drive, Orlando, FL - 1928
- A. E. Arthur One-Stop Service Station, Orlando, FL - 1929
- Old Station 9, 1099 King Street, Charleston, SC - 1933
- Charleston County Courthouse (original 1792 Statehouse) additions, 84 Broad Street, Charleston, SC - 1941
- Julian Mitchell School (now Mitchell Elementary)
- Rutledge Avenue Baptist Church, Charleston - 1917
- Rutledge Avenue Baptist Church (addition)
- Ben Tillman School (now the Ronald McNair School)

== Gallery ==
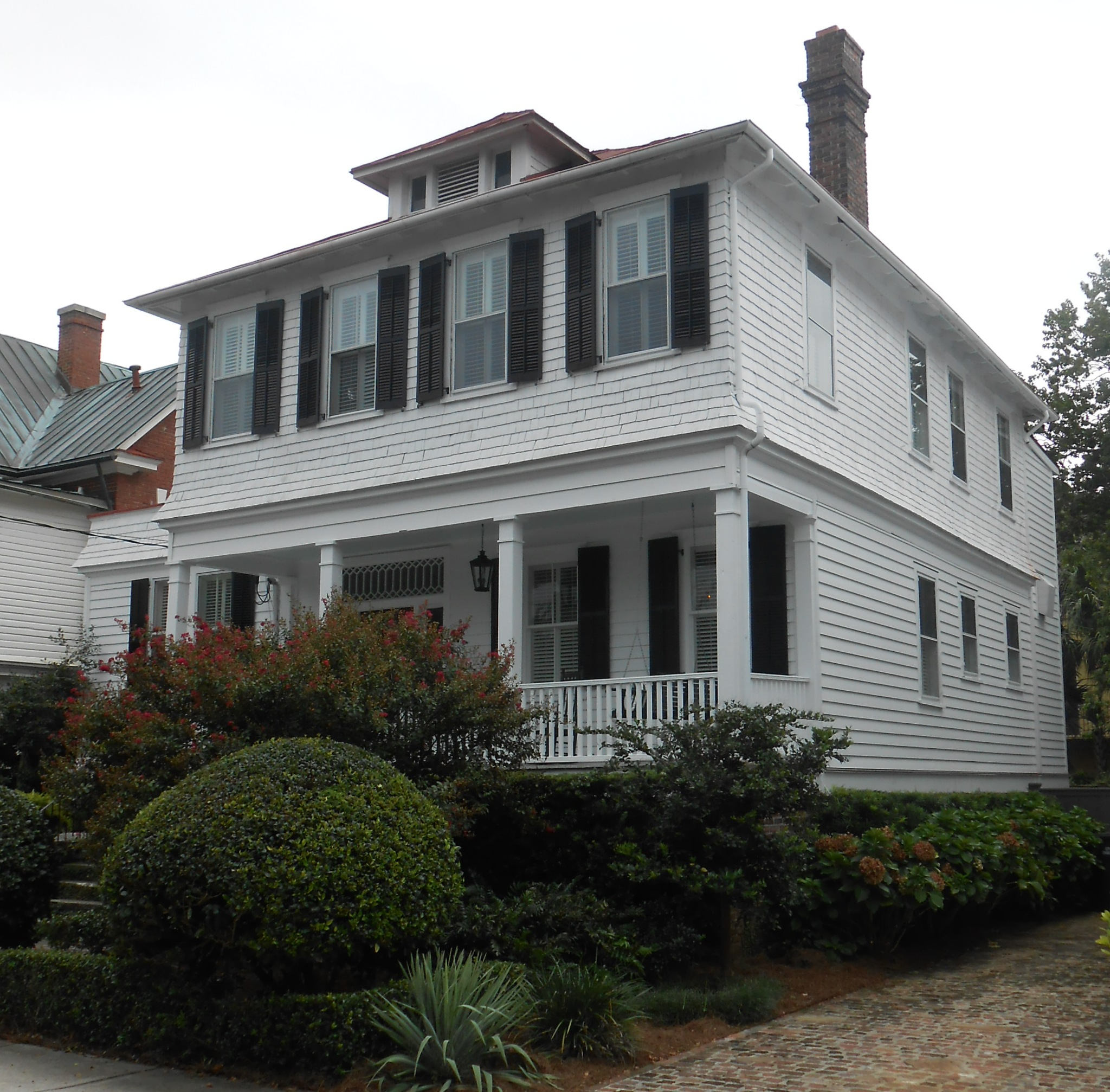
57 Gibbes St., Charleston, SC (c. 1915)

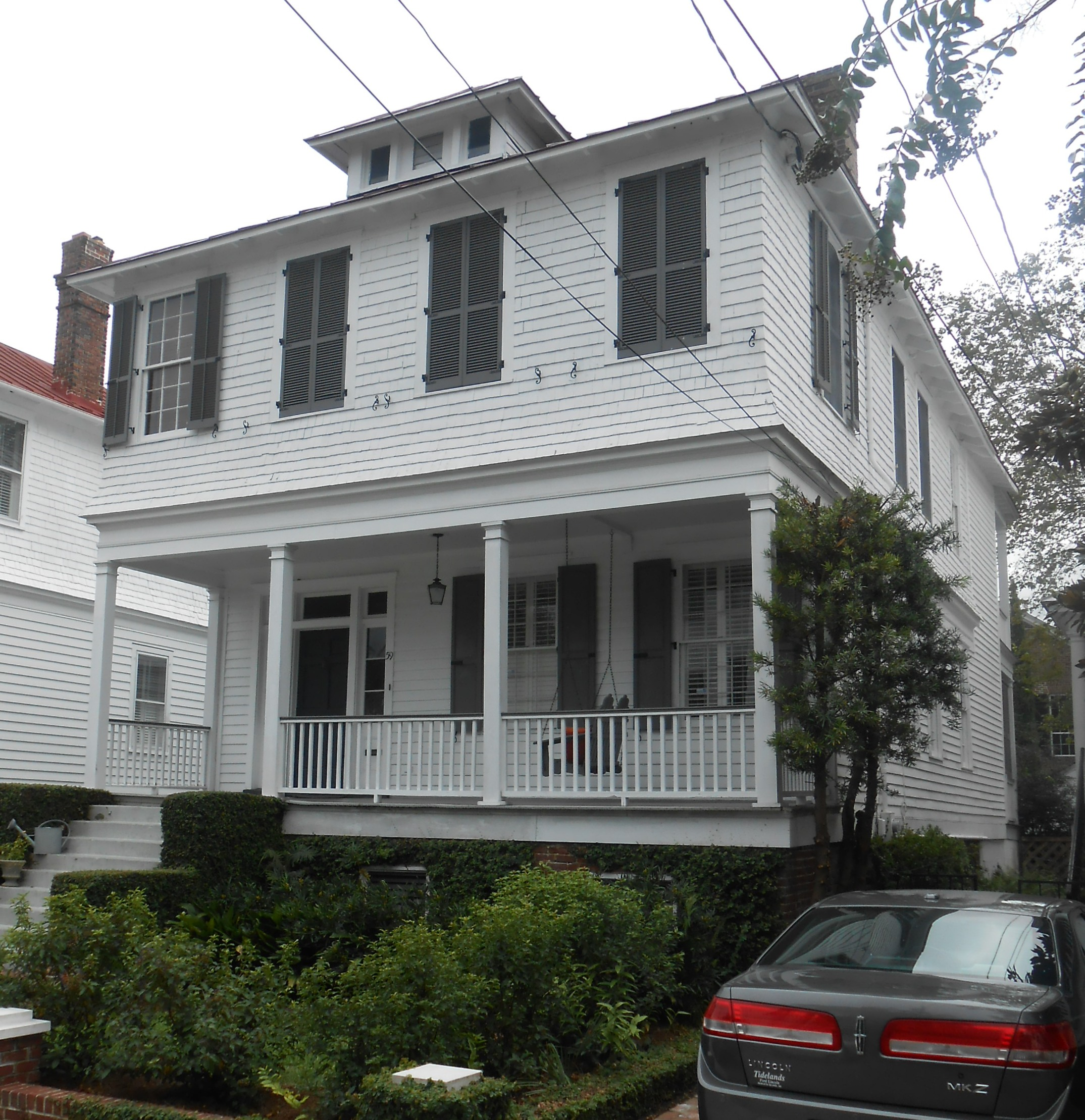
59 Gibbes St., Charleston, SC (c. 1915)

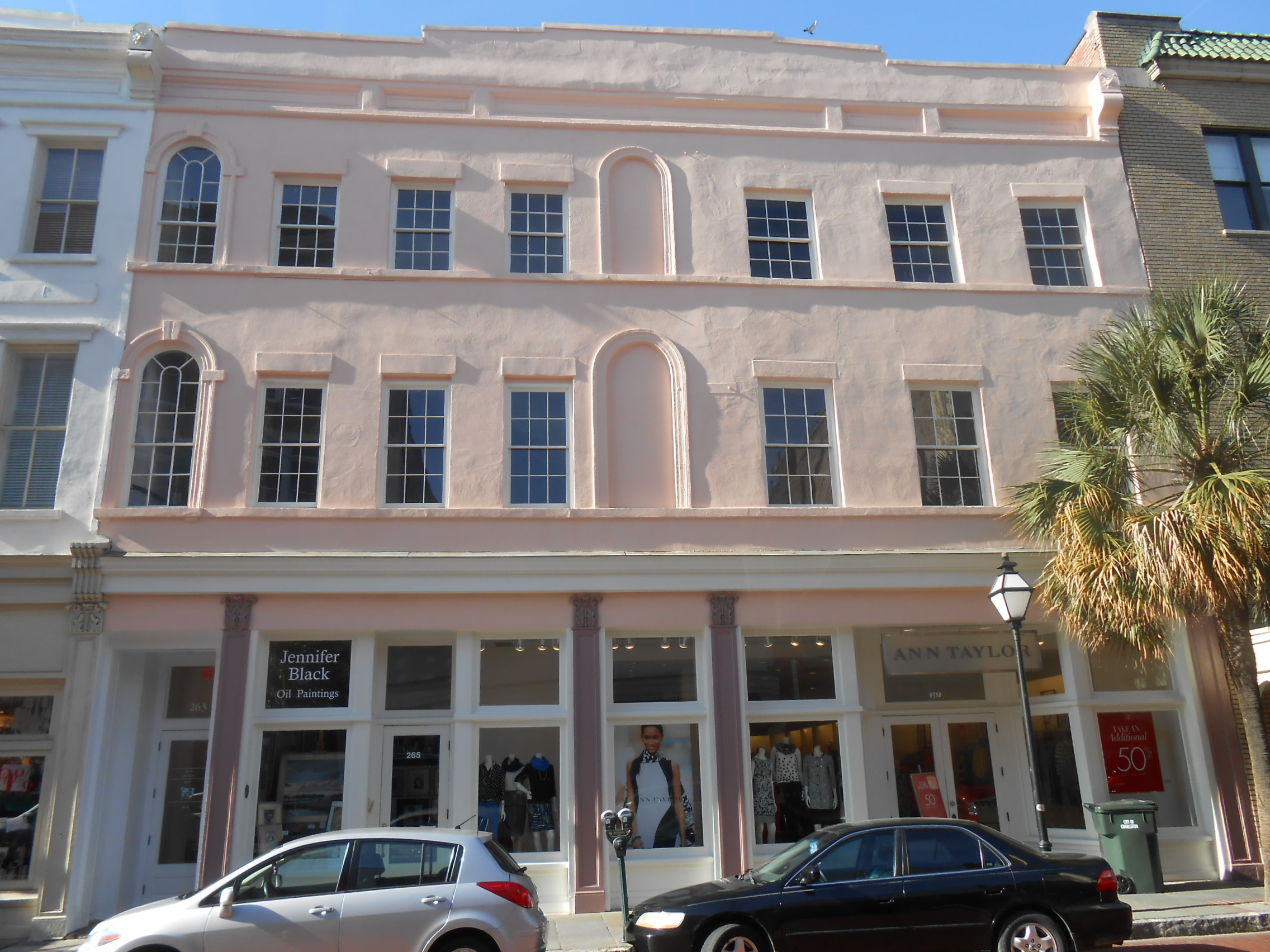
265-267 King St., Charleston, SC (c. 1920)

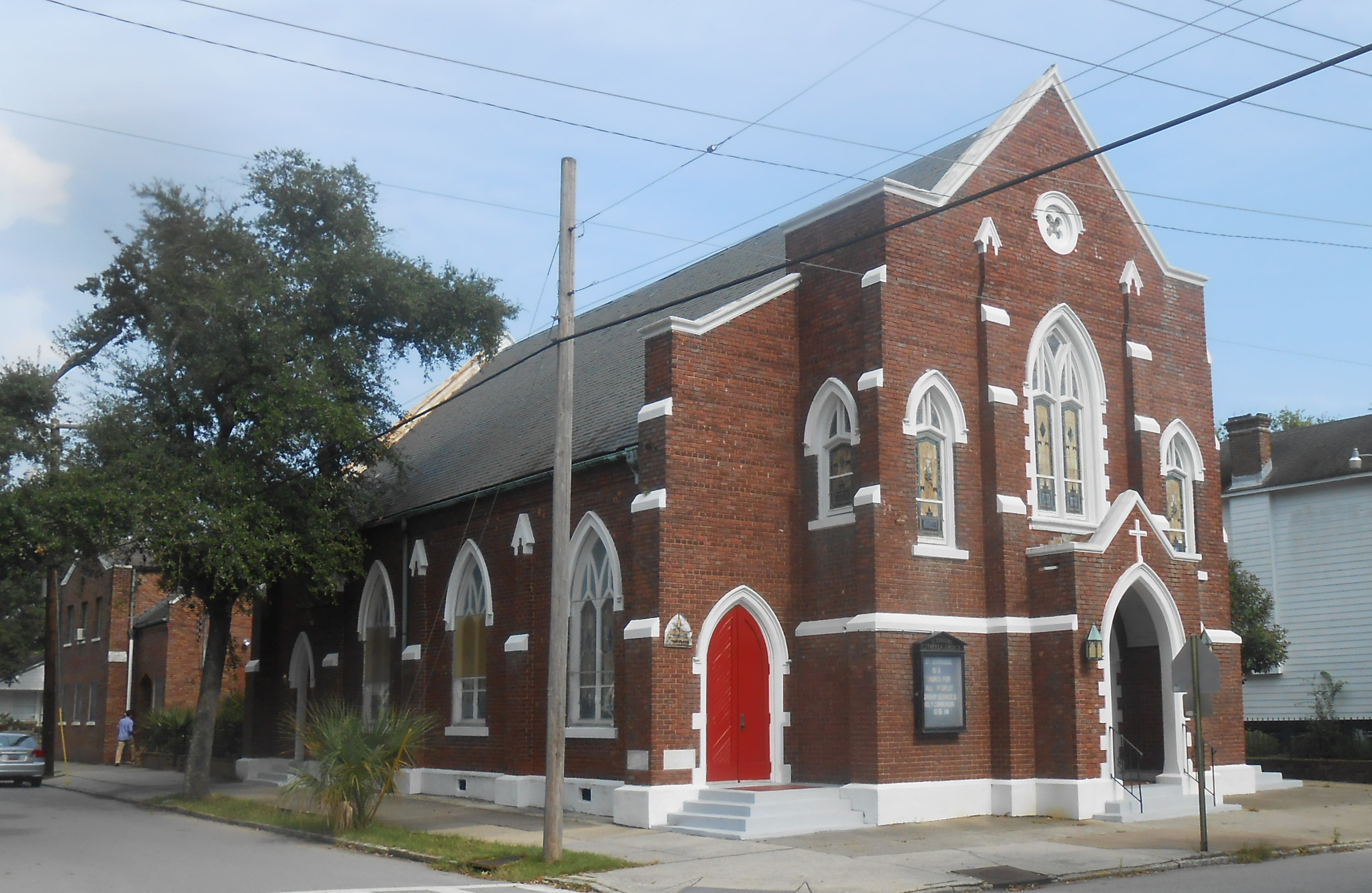
45 Moultrie St., Charleston, SC (c. 1922)

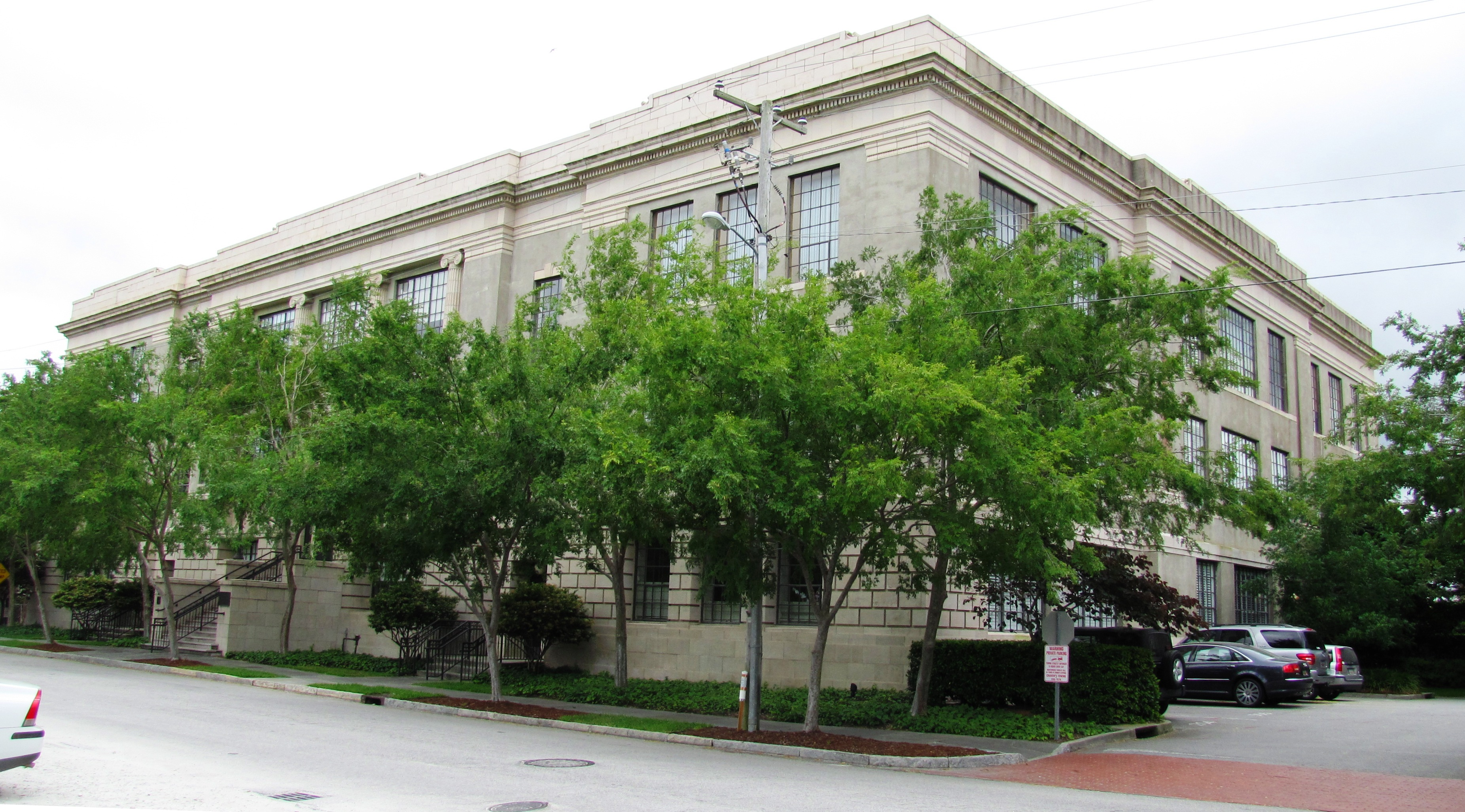
3 Chisolm St., Charleston, SC (c. 1923)

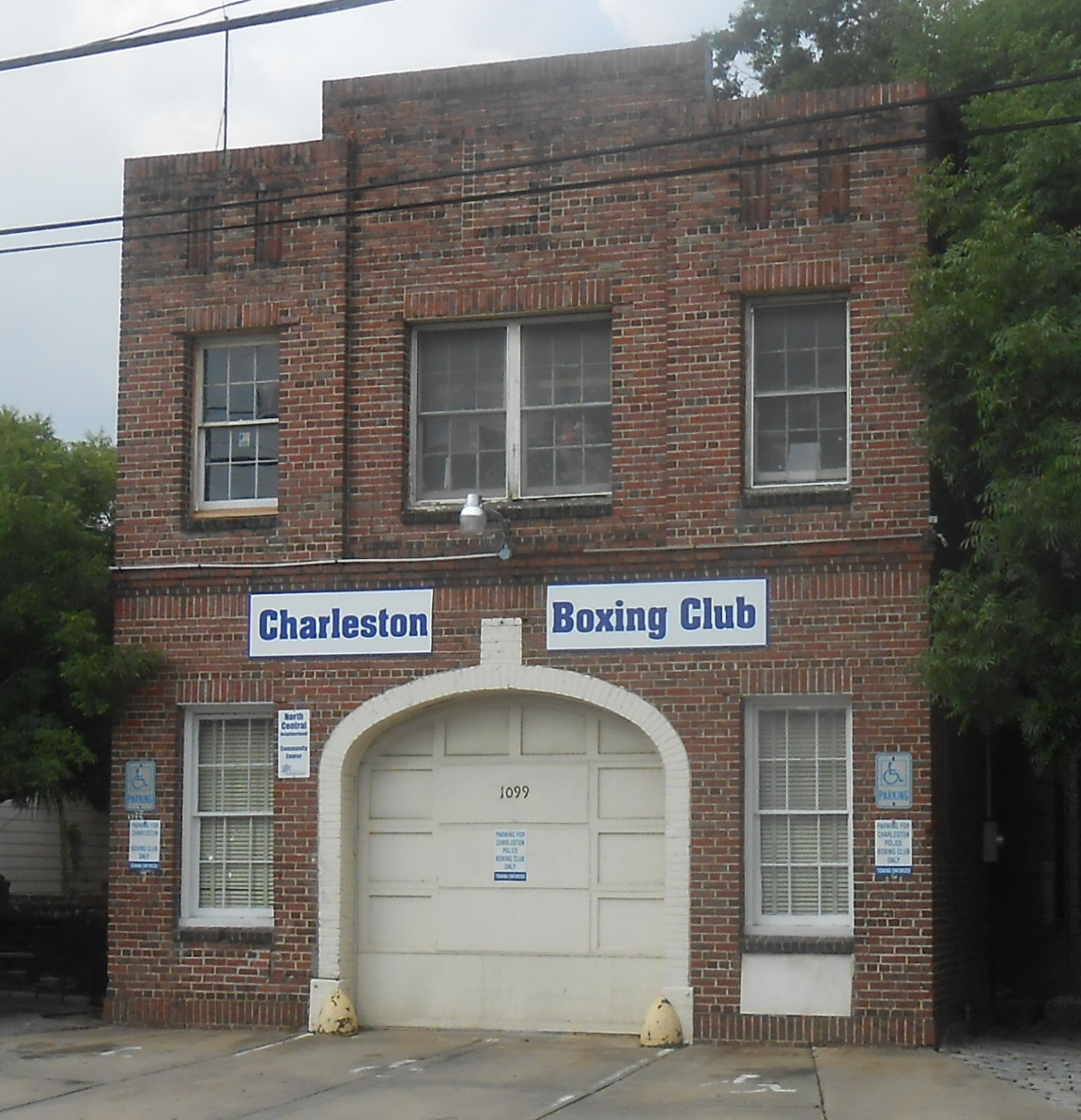
1099 King St., Charleston, SC (c. 1933)

== See also ==
- John Henry Devereux South Carolina architect who was a contemporary
