= Frederick H. Trimble =

American architect

Frederick H. Trimble was an American architect in Central Florida from the early 1900s through the 1920s. He worked in the Colonial Revival, Spanish Colonial Revival and Prairie Style.

Buildings listed on the National Register of Historic Places include:

- Fellsmere Public School, 22 S. Orange St. Fellsmere, FL Trimble, Frederick H.
- Luther F. Tilden House, 940 Tildenville School Rd. Winter Garden, FL Trimble, F.H.
- Vero Theatre, 2036 14th Ave. Vero Beach, FL Trimble, F.H.
- Lake Wales Historic Residential District, Roughly bounded by the Seaboard Airline RR grade, CSX RR tracks, E. Polk Ave., S. and N. Lake Shore Blvds. Lake Wales, FL Trimble, F.H.

== Background ==
Frederick Homer Trimble was born on June 2, 1878, and died August 13, 1934. His parents were Andrew Hill Trimble and Cynthia Ann Wright. Fred was one of their thirteen children: ten boys and three girls.

Frederick Homer Trimble graduated from Morningside College in Sioux City, Iowa, and was appointed by the Methodist Church to serve as the first industrial missionary to Fuzhou, China in 1905, putting to use his schooling in architecture and civil engineering. While on furlough, he married Rena Nellie Bowker, who then also went to China as a missionary in 1906. While in China Trimble served as superintendent of construction of Hwa Nan College, the Woman's College of South China.

== Spanish Colonial Revival ==
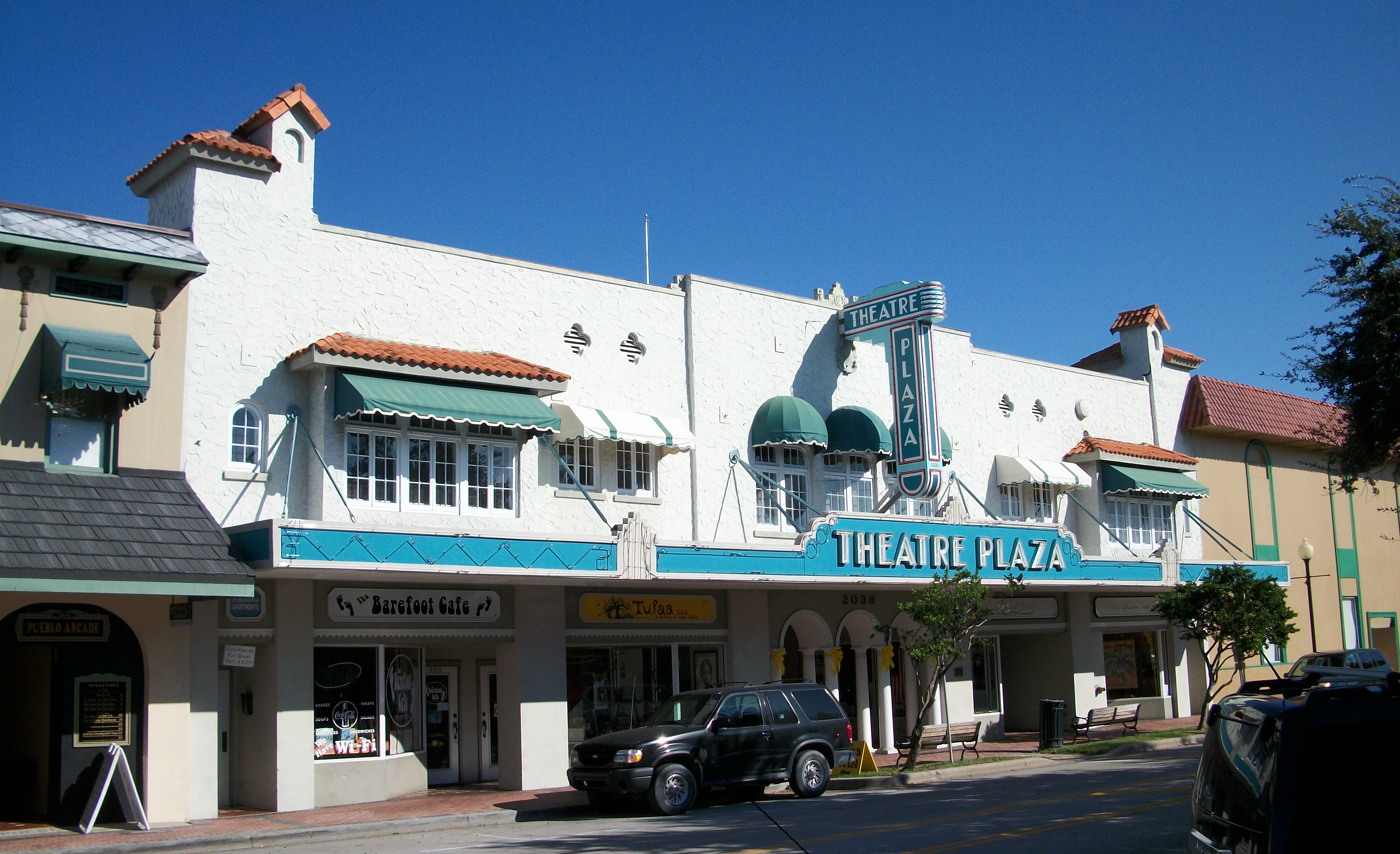
Vero Theatre

Trimble began his architectural career in the United States in Fellsmere, Florida. Trimble was noted for his design of school buildings starting with the Fellsmere School (1915). He designed more than 50 schools in Florida. In 1918-1919, Trimble employed Ida Annah Ryan as a designing architect.

Trimble's was one of only ten architectural firms listed in the Orlando phone directory in 1926, the others being: Frank L. Bodine, Fred E. Field, David Hyer, Murry S. King, George E. Krug, Howard M. Reynolds, Ryan and Roberts (Ida Annah Ryan and Isabel Roberts) and Percy P. Turner. This group of architects was quite intentional about creating a style of architecture in Central Florida suited to the region. Here is how they described it in an article from The Florida Circle of May 1924:

"Just as architects of old created styles to harmonize with their environment, so have the architects of Florida been creating, from native motifs, a style that is carefully adapted to the climatic conditions and surroundings of the state. This style has an individuality all its own and should have a fitting name to express its origins . . . The Florida Association of Architects will give a prize of $25.00 for the name selected."

This contest was to conclude in November 1924 and the winning name announced thereafter.

== Florida Southern College ==
In 1921, Trimble created a master plan for the campus of Florida Southern College in Lakeland, based upon Thomas Jefferson's campus plan for the University of Virginia. Frank Lloyd Wright’s later design for the campus was influenced by Trimble’s concepts, especially the domed central feature which Wright translated into a water dome, finally made operational in 2008.

== Architectural Work – Partial Listing ==
=== Florida ===
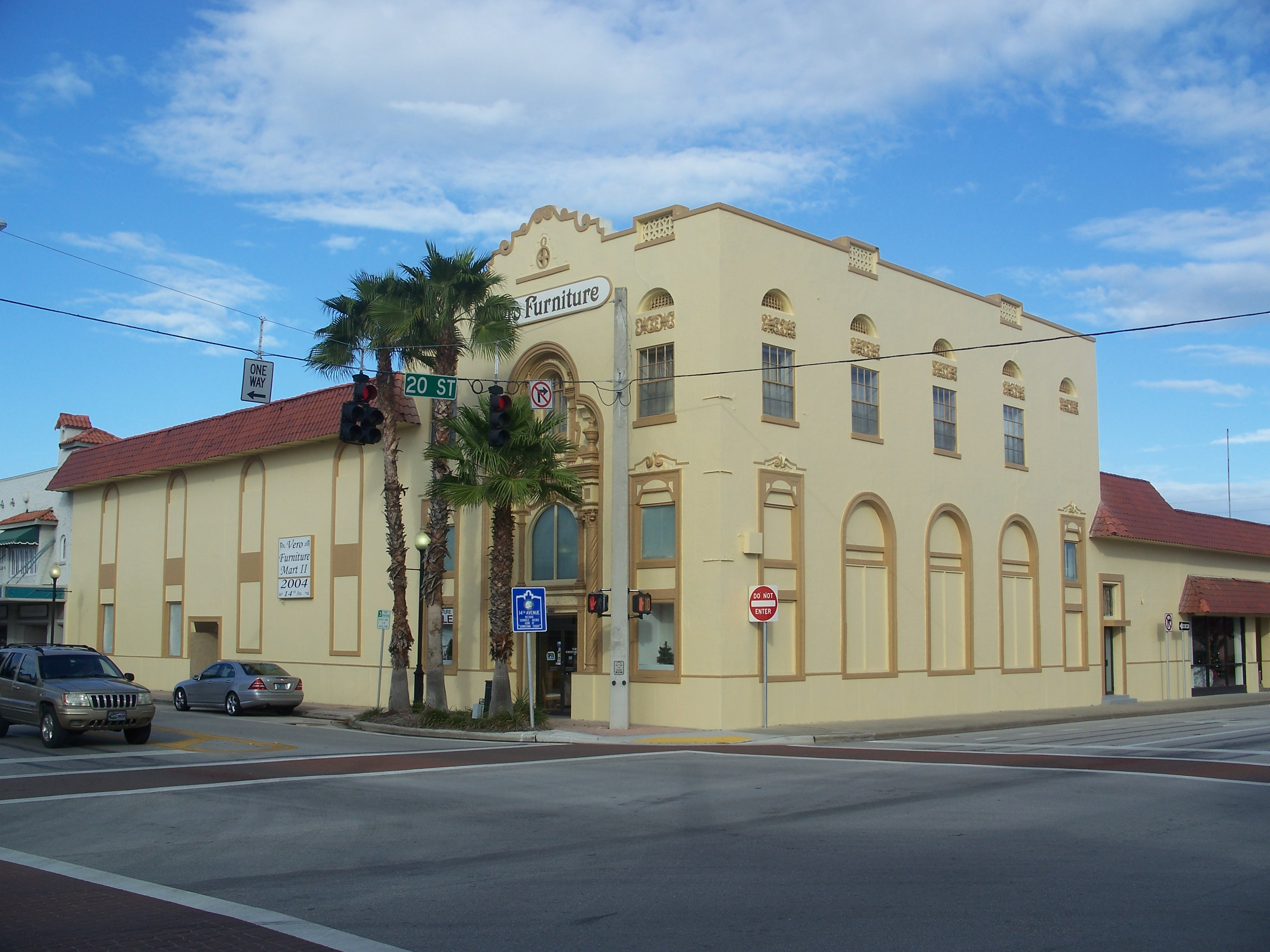
Vero Furniture

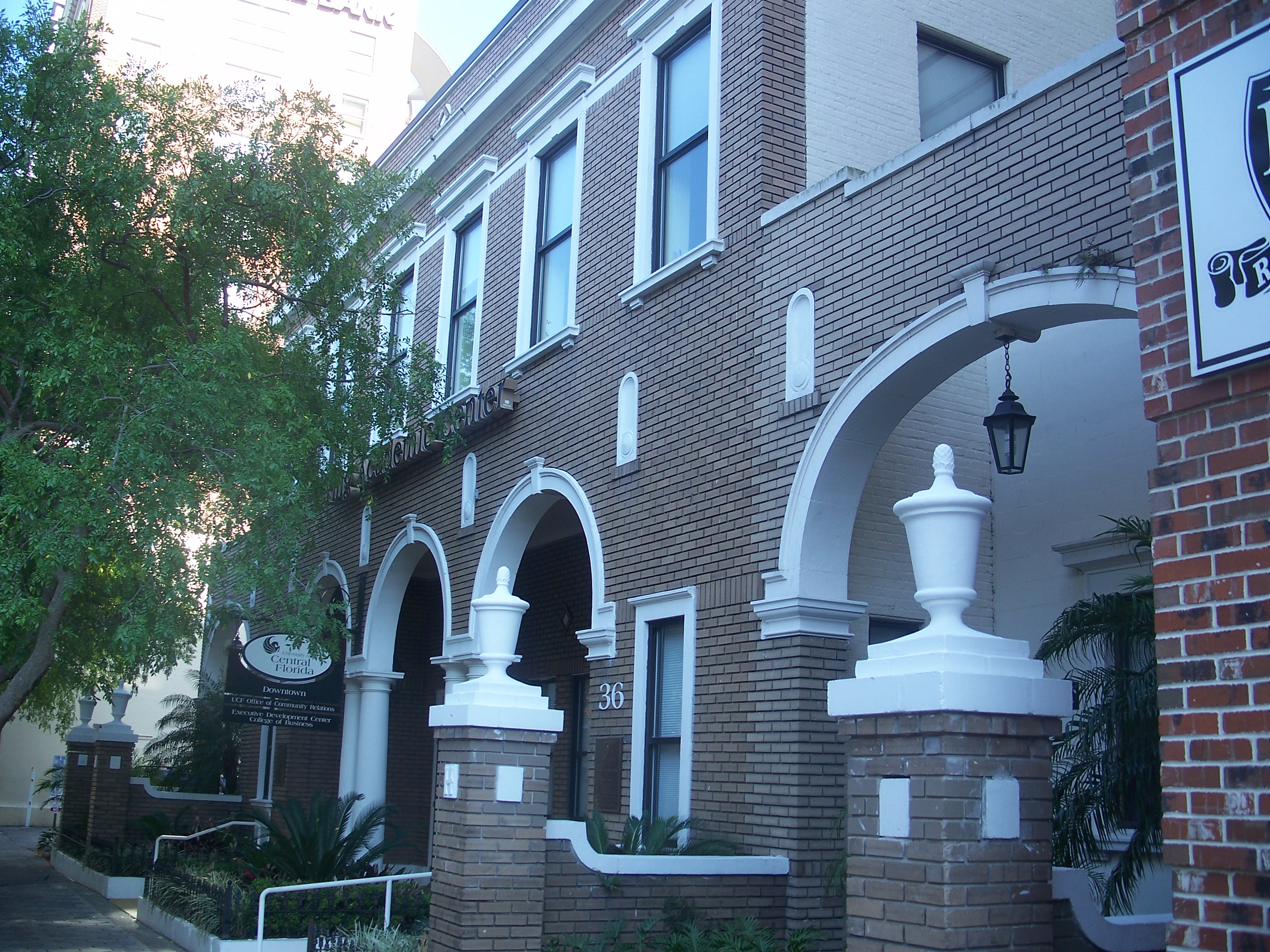
old Carey Funeral Home

- “Meadow Marsh” Luther F. Tilden House, 940 Tildenville School Road, Winter Garden – 1900 (renovations and additions to the 1877 house) – Classical Revival – added to the National Register of Historic Places in 1995
- Farmer's Bank (Vero Furniture Mart), Osceola Boulevard (20th Street) and Seminole Avenue (14th Avenue), Vero Beach – 1925 – Spanish Mission style
- Fellsmere Public School, 22 South Orange Street, Fellsmere – 1915-16 – Prairie Style
- Delaney Elementary School (now William Beardall Senior Center), Delaney and Gore Streets, Orlando – 1920
- Carey Hand Funeral Home, 36 West Pine Street, Orlando – 1920 – Romano-Tuscan style
- Montverde Academy, Montverde - before 1923
- Okeechobee High School, Okeechobee - before 1923
- Lake Worth High School, Lake Worth - before 1923
- Stuart High School, Stuart - before 1923
- St. Joseph Catholic School of Orlando - before 1923
- Orlando High School - 1921
- Ocoee High School - 1921
- Gulf High School, New Port Richey – 1922 – Prairie Style
- School, Sanford - 1922
- Old Lake County Courthouse, Tavares (with Alan J. MacDonough) - 1923
- Royal Park Inn, Royal Park Subdivision, Vero Beach – 1924 – Spanish Colonial Revival
- Florida Theatre (now Vero Theatre), 2036 14th Avenue, Vero Beach – 1924 – Mediterranean Revival – added to the National Historic Register in 1992
- Farmer's Bank (Vero Furniture Mart), Osceola Boulevard (20th Street) and Seminole Avenue (14th Avenue), Vero Beach – 1925 – Spanish Mission style
- Orange Apartments, 1426 Nineteenth Place, Vero Beach - c. 1925 – Spanish Colonial Revival
- Joseph-Reynolds Hall, Florida Southern College, Lakeland
- Florida Southern College, Campus Master Plan, Lakeland - 1925
- Blackstone Hotel (Orlando) (later Fort Gatlin Hotel) (demolished), 545 North Orange Avenue, Orlando – 1926 – Spanish Colonial Style
- Sebring High School and Auditorium, Sebring - circa 1928

=== Illinois ===
- Methodist Hospital of Central Illinois, Peoria (consulting architect)- 1917
