= St. Cloud Heritage Museum =

History museum in Florida, U.S.

- Veterans Memorial Library and Woman's Club of St. Cloud Auditorium
- U.S. National Register of Historic Places
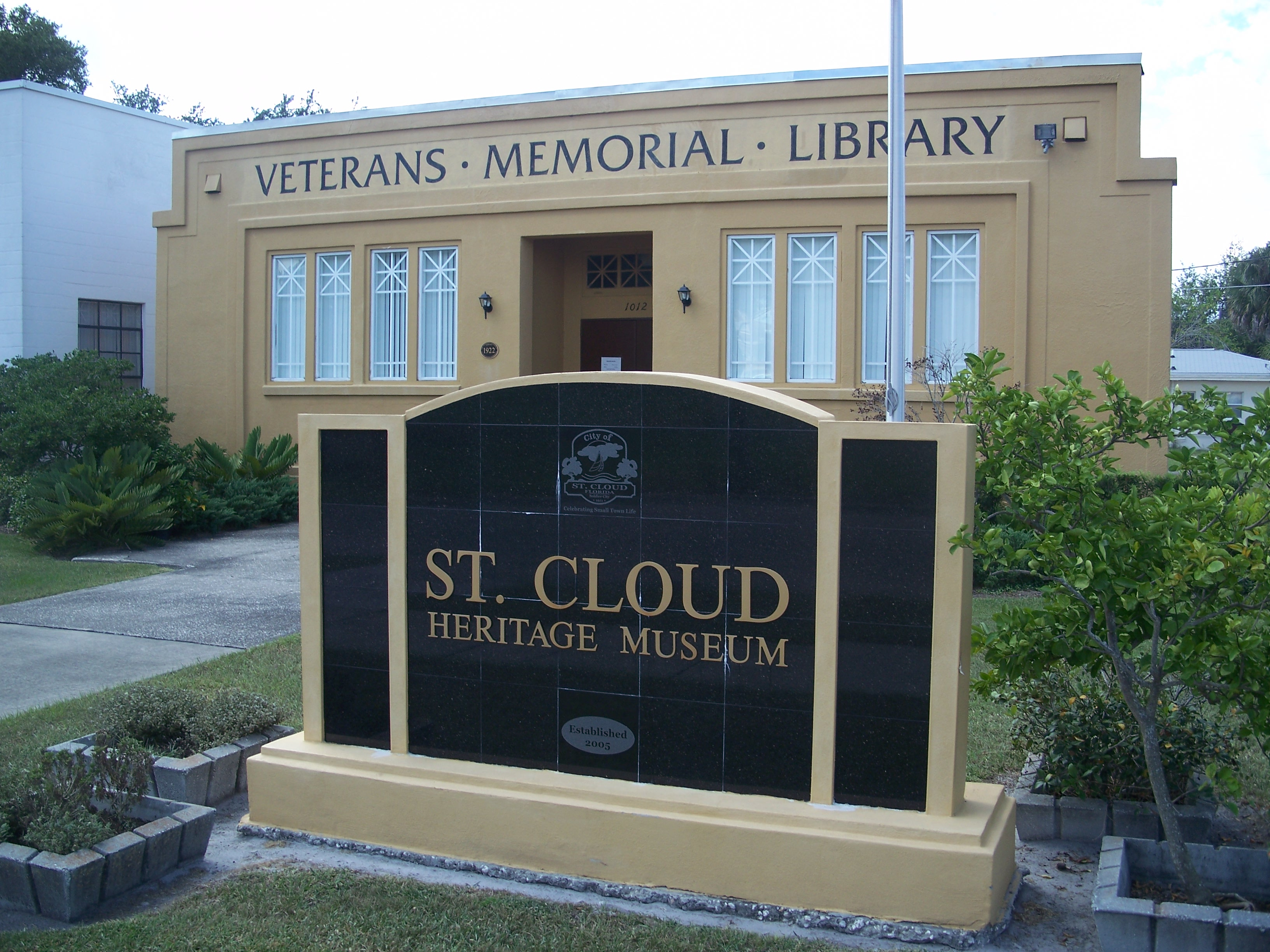
- Sign for the museum at the former library

- Location within Florida Location within the United States
- Coordinates: 28°14′54.96″N 81°17′4.92″W
- NRHP reference No.: 100005413
- Added to NRHP: August 3, 2020

St. Cloud Heritage Museum is a history museum in downtown St. Cloud, Florida, Osceola County, Florida. It is housed in the Veterans Memorial Library building at 1012 Massachusetts Avenue.

The museum is operated by the Woman's Club of St. Cloud and the City of St. Cloud. The library was built by the Woman's Club in 1922 and named in honor of the American Civil War veterans who founded St. Cloud. It was designed by Ida Annah Ryan and Isabel Roberts, who formed the first all-female architectural firm in Orlando. The building was previously the town's library for more than 50 years before the City of St. Cloud purchased it in 2001.

The museum was listed on the National Register of Historic Places on August 3, 2020 as the Veterans Memorial Library and Woman's Club of St. Cloud Auditorium.
