= Percy P. Turner =

American architect

Percy Pamorrow Turner (1891–1958) was an American architect who, in the 1920s-1950s practiced in Baltimore Maryland, Houston, Texas, Orlando, Florida, and Miami, Florida.

== Early years ==
Turner was born on December 28, 1891, in Frederick County, Maryland, the third son of Leonidas (Lonnie) Grant Turner and Amelia Archer. There were two daughters in the family, Amelia and Leona, later called Toni. (She changed her name to Nancy later and was a radio personality in New York.)The Turners were leading citizens of Baltimore, listed in the city's social register. Turner graduated from Princeton University at the top of his class, majoring in Architecture and Engineering.

== Architectural career ==
Turner served in the American Expeditionary Forces in France during World war I, where he piloted bi-wing planes. His commission was as a Second Lieutenant. He was shot down over France, but survived, retaining a bullet hole in one of his calves for the rest of his life.

Turner's father was in the real estate business in Baltimore, interested in the development of suburban property. Turner and his brother Robert joined with their father in this enterprise in the period around 1920. In 1922, the Turner family created a suburb called "The Pines on the Severn" in Arnold, Maryland, which continues today as a noted historic suburb along the Severn River north of Annapolis.

On December 18, 1928, in Temple, Texas, Turner married Temple native Marie Christine Robertson Bailiff, the daughter of Huling Robertson and Mary Gatlin Cooke; thereafter she seldom used her first name but went by Christine Robertson Turner. Christine's Robertson ancestry was large in the history of Texas, her grandfather being Elijah Sterling Clack Robertson, the founder of Salado College, and the family homestead in Salado still stands in 2018 as a historic site. Her grandfather, Sterling Robertson was a signer of the Texas Declaration of Independence and founder of The Robertson Colony of Texas, which stretched 100 miles in diameter. Her father, Huling, built most of Temple, and was instrumental in getting the M, K, and T Railroad to run through town. (Missouri, Kansas, and Texas.) He was a state senator for many years. Her mother, Mary (Mamie) founded the Betty Martin chapter of the Daughters of the American Revolution (DAR) in Temple, which is still in operation in 2018.

By 1926, Percy, who used his middle name (Pamorrow) in business, had relocated to Orlando, Florida, where Turner's office was located at 19 Court Street. In Orlando, Turner specialized in residential architecture. An example of his work stands at 219 Phillips Place in the Lake Copeland Historic District. Built in 1926, this is a finely preserved interpretation of the New England Colonial Revival style. It has a very wide board siding which is quite unusual for Orlando, and an unusual red slate roof. It also has fluted Doric columns supporting the entry pediment. Turner's was one of only 10 architectural firms listed in 1926, the others including: Ryan and Roberts (Ida Annah Ryan and Isabel Roberts), Frank L. Bodine, Fred E. Field, David Hyer, Murry S. King, George E. Krug, Howard M. Reynolds and Frederick H. Trimble. And one of 12 firms so listed in Orlando in 1927, which included Maurice E. Kressly.

Pamorrow moved to Texas when he married Christine Bailiff and they lived in San Antonio where Turner was a practicing architect and a member of the American Institute of Architects until mid-1935, when they returned to Florida, settling in Miami Beach. Their only child was Suzanne Christine Turner, b. Sept. 8, 1935, Miami, Florida. Turner's architectural style had changed with the times. Among his work in Miami was 1000 71st Street, Normandy Isles Historic District (circa 1935) with Art Moderne radiused corners, chevron details, and raised stucco banding.

== Later years ==
Turner continued to practice architecture in Miami and Miami Beach until WW II broke out, and one of his main achievements was designing and overseeing the construction of the Pan American Airways terminal in Camaguey, Cuba from December, 1941 until its completion in June, 1942. Christine and Suzanne accompanied him to Camaguey and lived there until returning to Miami. Turner then joined the U.S. Army Engineer Corps, and was sent to Port of Prince, Haiti, for a while, then reassigned to Trinidad. In 1944 he was further reassigned to Hanford, Washington, where he worked on the atomic bomb in secret. He left the service at the end of the war and returned to Miami. Christine had become ill with a brain tumor and died in 1946, leaving him to raise their daughter, Suzanne, alone. He rebuilt a small architectural practice and designed many outstanding buildings into the mid-1950s, including apartment houses, residences, store buildings, hotel renovations on South Beach following some hurricanes, some of the first "motels", and St. Rose of Lima Catholic church in Miami Shores. He left Miami in ailing health in 1958, moving to his daughter's home in Indianapolis, Indiana, where he died in September 1958. (Corrected by Suzanne Turner Barber, June 7, 2012 and April, 2018.)
