= Ida Annah Ryan =

American architect

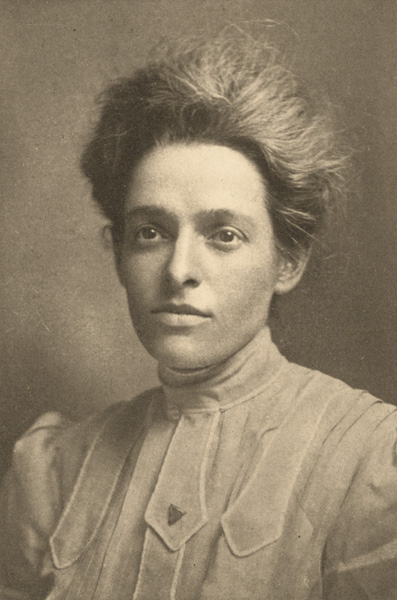
- Ryan circa 1906
- Born: November 4, 1873; Waltham, Massachusetts
- Died: February 17, 1950 (aged 76); Orlando, Florida
- Education: Massachusetts Institute of Technology
- Occupation: Architect
- Practice: Associated architectural firm[s]

Ida Annah Ryan (1873–1950) was a pioneering United States architect known for her work in Massachusetts and Florida. She was the first woman to receive a Master of Science from the Massachusetts Institute of Technology and the first woman to receive a Master's degree in architecture anywhere in the United States. She was the eighth woman to be admitted to the American Institute of Architects.

== Biography ==
Ryan was born on November 4, 1873, in Waltham, Massachusetts, one of five children of Albert Morse Ryan and Carrie S. Jameson. Albert Morse Ryan was a Waltham city employee and historian who also ran a milk business. She graduated from the Waltham High School. During her Waltham High School years, Ryan was first attracted to the study of architectural design.

=== Studies at Massachusetts Normal Art School ===
In 1892 Ida A. Ryan began attending classes at Massachusetts Normal Art School (now Massachusetts College of Art and Design), which was founded in 1873 with the intention to support the Massachusetts Drawing Act of 1870 by providing drawing teachers for the public schools as well as training professional artists, designers, and architects. In 1894 she received her diploma in Elementary Drawing and Constructive Art and Design (which encompasses Descriptive Geometry, Machine Drawing- Construction and Architectural Design).

=== Architecture Studies at MIT ===
Ida A. Ryan entered architecture studies at the Massachusetts Institute of Technology (MIT), which offered the first collegiate architectural studies program in the United States. There she studied with the noted architecture professor Constant-Désiré Despradelle. In 1905, Ryan received the Rotch Prize of two hundred dollars for the regular student making the best record during their four years of studies.

At the end of her term at the Massachusetts Institute of Technology, Ryan's junior design received the first of the first four prizes. Thereafter, she was invited to compete with only senior and fifth class men in the Junior Beaux Arts contest, in which she won second prize for a grand plan, elevation, and section of a public market.

In 1904, Ryan showed a project for "A Proposed City Hall" at the Boston Architectural Club's annual exhibition. In 1905, Ryan drafted a plan for a New England model town for her final master's degree project. In 1907, Ryan showed five examples of her work at the Boston Architectural Club Exhibition: Camp at Litchfield, NH, Cottage Made From a Stable, Sewage Pump House at Crescent Park, Cottage at Violet Hill, Waltham, and Inexpensive Two-Family House at Waltham Highlands. The two-family house is a large Spanish Revival stucco structure with double height bay windows, hip roof, overhanging eaves and a double height triple-arched entry porch that is a precursor of Ryan's work at 1114 Massachusetts Avenue, St. Cloud Florida; located at 228-240 Hammond Street the double-house is still in good condition more than a hundred years later.

Ryan became the first woman to earn a master of science degree from MIT and also the first woman in the United States to receive a master's degree in architecture. In 1907, Ryan was awarded a traveling scholarship of $1200, the highest prize that the Architectural Department could confer on one of its graduates. This enabled her to spend a year in Europe engaged in the study of architecture. Ryan spent the greater part of the time in Spain and Italy, making her headquarters in Naples.

While at MIT Ryan was a member of Cleophan a club for women students that also included Matilda A. Fraser and Harriet F. Locke (see below).

=== Architectural Practice in Waltham, Massachusetts ===
Ryan launched the first women's architectural practice in the United States in Waltham, showing a particular concern for the design of modest housing. In 1909, Ryan added fellow MIT graduate and women's rights activist Florence Luscomb to her practice, making this one of the first all-women's architectural practices in the United States. In February 1913, Miss Ryan was appointed the superintendent of buildings and grounds and buildings inspector for the city of Waltham, by Mayor Duane.

Typical of her work during this time is the house that Ryan designed for her nephew as a wedding present in 1914, located at 19 Boynton Street, Waltham. The 2 1/2-storey smooth stucco residence turns its gable-end to the street. A small, 1-storey covered porch at the entrance is distinguished by an arched roof reminiscent of the work of George Washington Maher in the Chicago suburbs. Windows are placed singly, in pairs, or, as in the gable, in threes, while sill heights vary according to the interior needs. Ryan would continue the use of many of these distinctive elements in her work in Florida. During her Waltham practice, Ryan also designed the spacious, well-appointed home of industrialist B. C. Ames (1917). Many of the most attractive Waltham homes of that era were said to have been designed by Ryan. Also of note is the apartment building at 19 Hammond Street, Waltham; a Ryan remodeling of a barn once owned by David Smith. Her address was, for a time, at this building.

While associated with fellow MIT graduate Harriet F. Locke (1870–1919), Ryan was responsible for the design of Memorial Hospital, Nashua, New Hampshire, circa 1915, a 3-story stuccoed symmetrical building with recessed porches, of a simplified Grecian design, closely anticipating the Amherst Apartments in Orlando. The intertwined "cross and x" used for the porch railings would appear later in the Veteran's Memorial Library windows and ventilation grills. The hospital featured a roof parapet that prefigures Ryan and Roberts' work in Florida, as well.

Ryan was active in the women's suffrage movement, a member of the Waltham Equal Suffrage League and the Political Equality Association of Massachusetts. Her recreational activities included camping and traveling. When the United States entered World War I, Ryan gave her services without charge in designing and decorating the Army and Navy Canteen on Boston Common. Ryan offered her services to the government in Washington, D.C., and was the first woman employed in the War Department (in the gun carriage section).

Ryan began an association with the Central Florida area while still in practice in Massachusetts, designing there the Unity Chapel of Orlando (built in 1913, remodeled by Ryan and Roberts circa 1920). Throughout this time, Ryan's many attempts to join the Massachusetts chapter of the American Institute of Architects were rebuffed solely because she was a woman.

=== Architectural Practice in Central Florida ===
As a result of this and of the building slump caused by the First World War, Ida A. Ryan moved to Central Florida and began an architecture practice based in Orlando, Florida. She became Orlando's first female architect. In 1918–1919, Frederick H. Trimble employed Ryan as designing architect in his firm. She was finally admitted to AIA in 1921, only the eighth woman nationwide.

Soon thereafter Ryan was joined by Isabel Roberts (1871–1955) who had been a designer-draftsman in the Oak Park Studio of Frank Lloyd Wright and the co-owner, with her mother Mary, of the Isabel Roberts House. Ida Annah Ryan and Isabel Roberts formed an architectural practice, "Ryan and Roberts" which was among no more than twelve firms active in Orlando in the 1920s. Their business is listed under the heading "Architects" as "Ryan and Roberts" in the 1926 and in the 1927 Orlando City Directories, at 240 S. Orange St. and the Kenilworth Terrace address. One of only 10 architectural firms listed in 1926, the others include Frank L. Bodine, Fred E. Field, David Hyer, Murry S. King, George E. Krug, Howard M. Reynolds, Frederick H. Trimble and Percy P. Turner. And one of 12 firms so listed in Orlando in 1927, which included Maurice E. Kressly. Each of these architects is notable and together these firms were supportive colleagues in promoting excellence in the built environment, as one can learn by reading the links to each.

Among the works of "Ryan and Roberts" are:

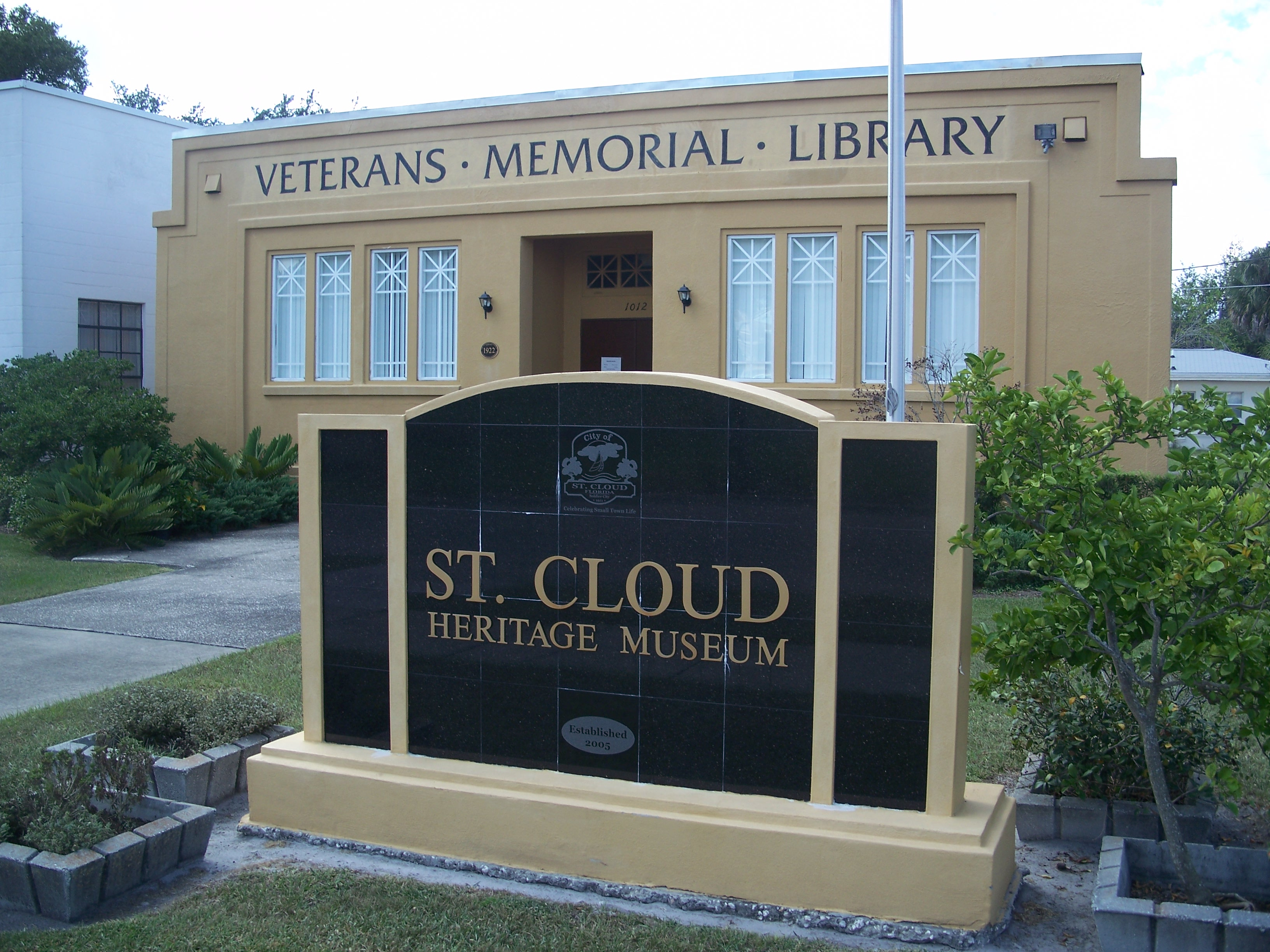
Veterans Memorial Library

Amherst Apartments

- Veterans Memorial Library - 1012 Massachusetts Ave., St. Cloud, Florida. Isabel Roberts' brother-in-law, John B. Somerville, served on the building committee, a connection which resulted in Ryan and Roberts obtaining this commission. In 1922, an outline of what was desired was laid before architects Miss Ida Annah Ryan and Miss Isabel Roberts of Orlando. The plans submitted by them were subsequently accepted. The architects insisted on a motto. Carlyle's, "The true university is a collection of books," was chosen. The building, although described as of Grecian style is in fact reminiscent of the designs of many of the Prairie School small bank buildings of the upper Midwest by Louis Sullivan, Frank Lloyd Wright and others, notably Wright's First National Bank of Dwight, Illinois, and the Madison State Bank Building, Madison, Minnesota, by Purcell & Elmslie, (1913, demolished 1968). The library is constructed of hollow tile with stained stucco exterior and still in use today.
- Amherst Apartments - 325 West Colonial Drive, Orlando, Florida. The Amherst Apartments were, for many years, Orlando's most prestigious apartment address. Designed by Ida A. Ryan and Isabel Roberts in the Prairie Style and built in 1921–1922, this orange-yellow brick building featured forty-seven apartments situated on Lake Concord. The building was demolished in 1986.
- Unity Chapel, Orlando (remodeled by Ryan and Roberts circa 1920; demolished in the 1960s). For many years, this charming building, in a stuccoed English vernacular style, was the worship home of First Unitarian Church of Orlando, near Lake Eola. Ida Annah Ryan was a member of this congregation. Some scholars have had a hard time identifying this building, which Isabel listed on her AIA application. It is not to be confused with Frank Lloyd Wright's famous Unity Temple in Oak Park, Illinois.
- Tourist Club House - 700 Indiana Ave., St. Cloud, Florida. This club house for the Tourist Club of St. Cloud was opened in the city park on December 3, 1923. Designed by Ida Annah Ryan and Isabel Roberts, it shows the influence of the Prairie School with which Roberts was associated, as a rectangular structure with a barrel-roofed auditorium. Frank Lloyd Wright's Oak Park Studio developed this style with open, airy plans, low-pitched hip or gable roofs, horizontal brick walls, exposed rafter ends, broad overhanging eaves and grouped wood windows. The building was demolished circa 2004.
- The Ryan/Roberts Home and Studio – 834 Kenilworth Terrace, Orlando, Florida. Ryan and Roberts designed this Mediterranean Revival–style home and studio for their own use in 1920–24. The stucco structure with gable roof is in a simplified Mediterranean revival style. The details of the design include asymmetrical window placements, decorative attic vents, side yard orientation and gently scalloped buttresses. It is a very well maintained private residence today.
- The Chapel at the Fisk Funeral Home, 1107–1111 Massachusetts Avenue, St. Cloud.
- The Pennsylvania Hotel Building, 10th Street between Pennsylvania Ave. and Florida Avenue, St. Cloud, Florida. The building now houses the St. Cloud Twin Theatres.
- The Peoples Bank Building, southeast corner of 10th Street and New York Avenue, St. Cloud, Florida. The bank failed in the late Twenties; the main floor of the building is now used as a cafe and barber shop.
- Ross E. Jeffries Elementary School, 1200 Vermont Avenue, St. Cloud, Florida, circa 1926; Though positive documentation has been lost to time, records show that the designers of the Mediterranean Revival style school's original building may have been Ryan & Roberts. The building is distinguished by an arched porch in the offset tower main entry and a low profile accentuated by a curved parapet-roofed bay. The facade consists chiefly of large tri-part Chicago style windows, with small end windows as accents.
- Lester M. Austin Sr. Residence, 541 North Boyd Street, Winter Garden, Florida, circa 1927. A large Mediterranean Revival stucco house with tile roof and triparte arched windows. The Austin Residence is well-maintained and remains in private hands.
- The Matilda A. Fraser Residence, Orlando, Florida (private). A spacious, elegant Mediterranean Revival stucco mansion situated on one of Orlando's secluded lakes, the Fraser Residence is well-maintained and remains in private hands. Ryan and Roberts' freedom with window shapes and placement is particularly evident in this house, as is their use of round-headed French doors and similar windows, without any 45 degree angle dividers and with the two half circle segments on each side. It was a popular device with the firm and might be thought of as one of their "trademarks". This home served as Orlando Opera Guild's 1988 Designers' Show House. In 2008-2009, the City of Orlando attempted to purchase the house in order to demolish it for green space around Florida Hospital. Four homes were bought and destroyed, including the oldest house in the area, a two story structure with half-basement built in 1915. However, due to the impending recession, the offer for the Fraser residence was withdrawn..

Ida A. Ryan worked with builder Samuel (Sam) Stoltz who created fantasy architecture with original murals in storybook settings in Orlando, Mount Plymouth, and Windermere, Florida. Ryan lived in Orlando until her death on February 17, 1950, after an illness of several years, during which she was cared for by Isabel Roberts. According to her wishes, Ryan was buried in her hometown of Waltham, Massachusetts.

== See also ==
- Agnes Ballard, the first woman AIA from Florida, who was also born in Massachusetts
- Marion Manley, the third woman AIA from Florida and the first FAIA from the state
- Women in architecture
