= America Street School =

- U.S. National Register of Historic Places
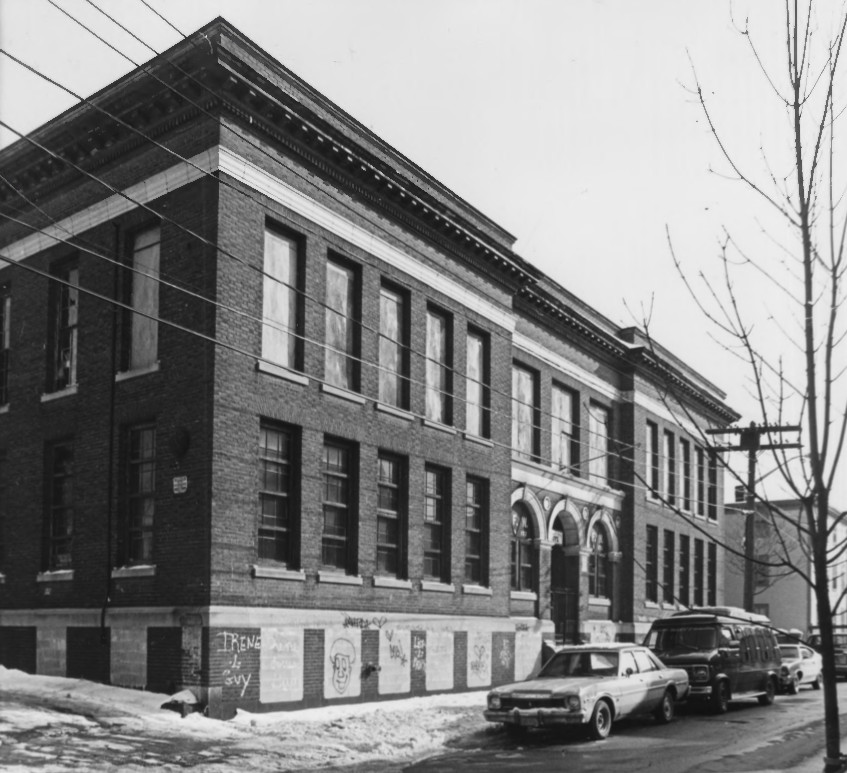
- 1987 photo

- Location within Rhode Island Location within the United States
- Location: 22 America St., Providence, Rhode Island
- Coordinates: 41°49′23″N 71°25′42″W
- Built: 1905
- Architect: Frederick E. Field
- Demolished: 1996
- NRHP reference No.: 87000996
- Added to NRHP: June 18, 1987

The America Street School was a historic school at 22 America Street in Providence, Rhode Island. The school was a two-story brick structure, built in 1905 to a design by Frederick E. Field. It housed ten classrooms (five on each floor), and was one of four similarly sized schools built by the city between 1887 and 1916. The building served the city as a school until 1955, and was used for a time thereafter as a meeting place for a local branch of the Veterans of Foreign Wars.

The building was listed on the National Register of Historic Places in 1987. It was listed as one of the "Ten Most Endangered Properties" by the Providence Preservation Society in 1995, and was demolished in 1996.

== See also ==
- National Register of Historic Places listings in Providence, Rhode Island
