= Frank L. Bodine =

American architect

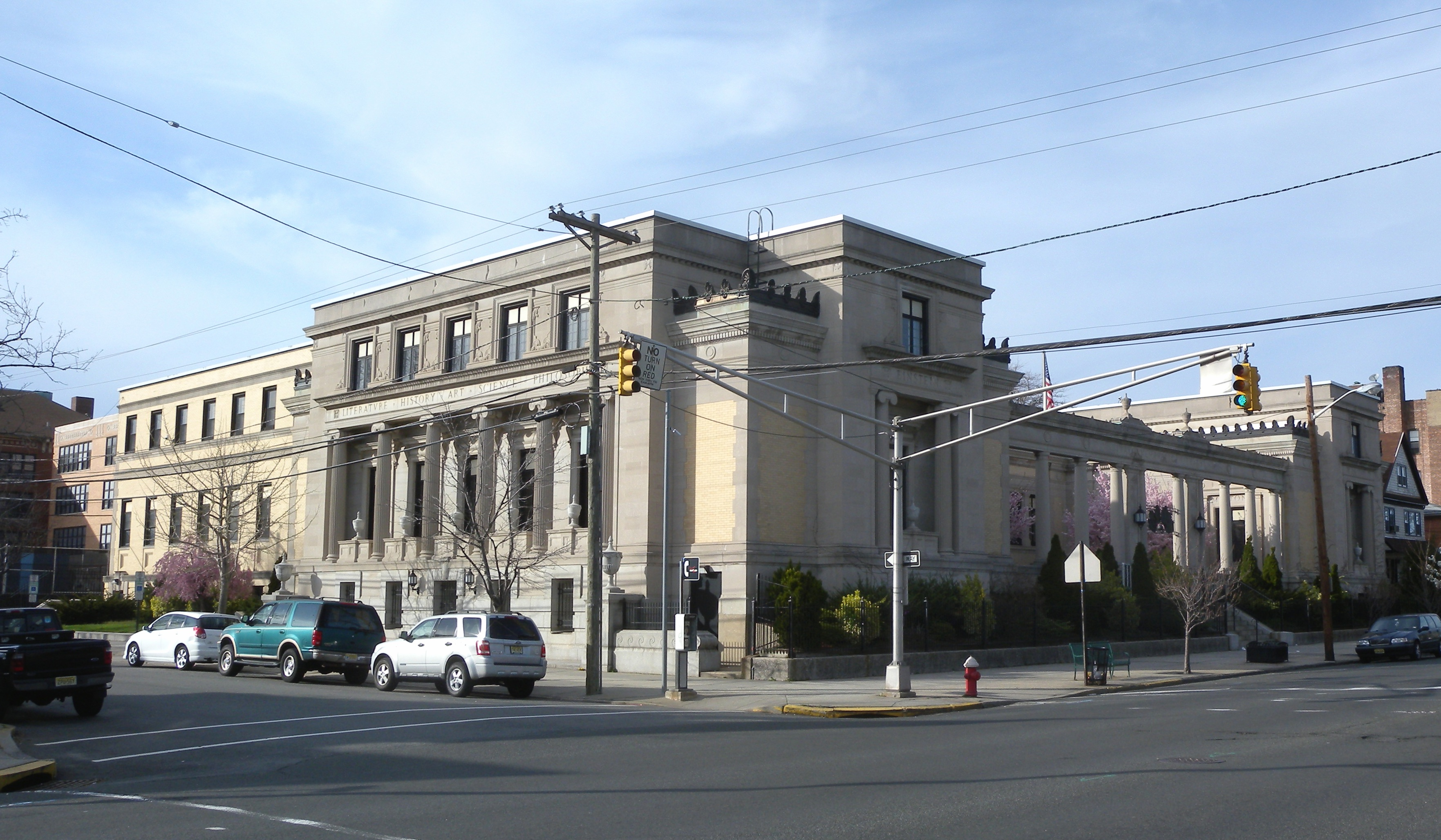
Bayonne Free Public Library

Frank Lee Bodine (April 10, 1874 – after 1930) was an American architect who practiced in Asbury Park, New Jersey, and in Orlando, Florida, in the first four decades of the twentieth century.

Bodine was born April 10, 1874, in Bridgeton, New Jersey. He was the son of Jeremiah Nixon Bodine and Annie Alexander Milliken. J. Nixon Bodine was a prosperous glass manufacturer.

Bodine was educated at The Hill School with the class of 1896, but left before receiving his diploma in order to enroll at Penn. Bodine was an 1899 graduate of the University of Pennsylvania with a B.S. degree in architecture. While a student at Penn, he was awarded the T-Square Club prize, in 1897. From offices in Asbury Park, New Jersey, Frank L. Bodine designed a number of passenger depots for the Central Railroad of New Jersey, including Somerville, White House and Westfield. The Somerville depot is especially notable. The 1890 structure is perhaps the most distinctive station in the Raritan Valley, with its large stone arches, variety of dormers and corner turret with bell-shaped roof.

In addition to the many early New Jersey railroad stations, Bodine designed multiple civic, commercial and major residential commissions in New Jersey, New York, and Florida from the 1890s to the 1930s. One of the most notable structures he designed is the office building that housed the offices of Woodrow Wilson at the time of his election to presidency and the site of his acceptance.

Although Bodine submitted an architectural proposal for the 1903/1904 Carnegie Library in Bayonne the proposal that was accepted came from Edward Lippincott Tilton. Tilton also designed a rectangular Annex at the rear of the building in 1914. Architect Charles Shilowitz designed two wings that form a courtyard at the front of the building in a major addition between 1929 and 1933.

In 1917, his addresses were: 925 Chestnut St., Philadelphia, and 320 Midland Avenue, St. Davids, Pennsylvania.

On September 12, 1918, Bodine registered for the World War I draft in Ridley Park, Pennsylvania. From 1920 to 1930, Frank and Ida H. Bodine were living in Radnor, Delaware County. In 1920 Bodine won a statewide competition for the design of an Architect's Certificate sponsored by the Pennsylvania State Board of Examiners of Architects; at that time, his address was in St. Davids, Pennsylvania. Bodine was for a time employed in the practice of "Rankin, Kellogg and Crane" of Philadelphia.

By the mid-1920s the Bodines established a winter residence in Orlando, Florida, at 15 E. Amelia Avenue, later moving to 1312 Ferncreek Avenue. His office was at 126 South Orange Avenue. Bodine's was one of 10 architectural firms listed in Orlando in 1926, the others including: Fred E. Field, David Hyer, Murry S. King, George E. Krug, Howard M. Reynolds, Frederick H. Trimble, Ryan and Roberts (Ida Annah Ryan and Isabel Roberts) and Percy P. Turner. Bodine practiced architecture in both states thereafter. The couple had no children.

== Architectural work – partial listing ==
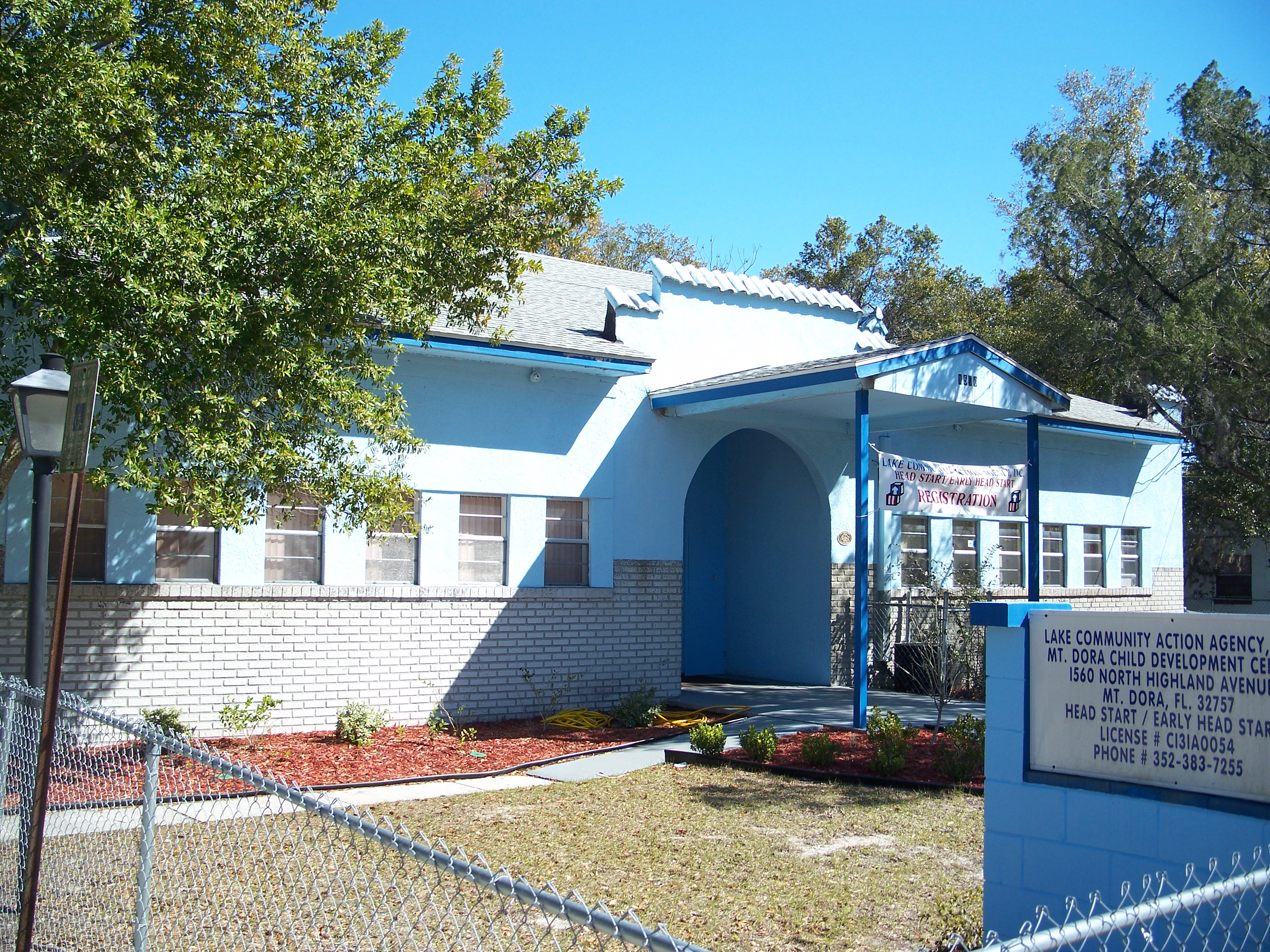
Milner-Rosenwald Academy

- Depot of the Central Railroad of New Jersey, Veterans Memorial Drive West, Somerville, New Jersey, – 1890
- West 8th Street Station of the Jersey Central Railroad, Bayonne, New Jersey – 1892
- Carnegie Library, Bayonne, New Jersey (on the list of New Jersey's 150 best buildings) – 1907
- Thompson Building, Maple Street, Somerville, New Jersey,
- The Belmar Railroad Station – New York – Long Branch Railroad, tracks at Tenth Avenue, Belmar, New Jersey – 1910
- Milner-Rosenwald Academy, 1560 Highland Street, Mt. Dora, Florida – 1926
