= Isabel Roberts =

American architect

- Born: March 1871; Mexico, Missouri
- Died: 27 December 1955 (aged 84); Orlando, Florida
- Occupation: Architect
- Practice: Frank Lloyd Wright Oak Park Studio, Ryan and Roberts

Isabel Roberts (March 1871 – December 27, 1955) was a Prairie School figure, member of the architectural design team in the Oak Park Studio of Frank Lloyd Wright and partner with Ida Annah Ryan in the Orlando, Florida architecture firm, "Ryan and Roberts".

== Childhood ==
Roberts was born in Mexico, Missouri, the younger of two surviving daughters of James H. and Mary Harris Roberts. James was a mechanic and inventor born in Utica, New York; Mary, a homemaker and a native of Prince Edward Island. They had been married in 1867 in New York state. They lived for a time in Missouri, where Roberts and her sister Charlotte were both born. Leaving Missouri, the Roberts family moved several more times, including to Providence, Rhode Island. They eventually settled in South Bend, Indiana, where James H. Roberts worked as a foreman in the machine shop of the Oliver Chilled Plow factory for more than 20 years, then in 1901 became Deputy Director of Factory Inspections for the State of Indiana. James H. Roberts, who also served as a Republican city councilman from 1892 to 1896, died Feb. 9, 1907. The Roberts family were active members of the First Presbyterian Church of South Bend, and social and civic groups through which they became friends of Laura Caskey Bowsher (later, DeRhodes). This friendship eventually led to Roberts' introducing Laura to Frank Lloyd Wright and Laura's commissioning from Wright's studio the K. C. DeRhodes House.

== Architectural education ==
Isabel Roberts spent three years in New York City, studying architecture in the atelier Masqueray-Chambers (1899-1901), the first atelier (or studio) in the United States established to teach the practice of architecture along the French lines of the Ecole des Beaux Arts. It was established by Emmanuel Louis Masqueray; architect Walter B. Chambers shared in this enterprise. Located at 123 E. 23rd Street, this was the first wholly independent atelier opened in the United States. Masqueray is best remembered as the architect of the St. Louis Exposition and of the Cathedral of Saint Paul in Saint Paul, Minnesota. Roberts found herself among an impressive roster of future architects who studied with Masqueray, including William Van Alen, who would become the architect of the Chrysler Building. Starting in 1899, Masqueray made a concerted effort to include women among his architectural students and even opened a second atelier especially for women students at 37-40 West 22nd Street in New York. As was said at the time, "...he has unbounded faith in women's ability to succeed in architecture...provided they go about it seriously." While in New York, Roberts lived at 129 West 96th Street.

== Oak Park, Illinois ==
Isabel Roberts was among Wright's first employees when he left Louis Sullivan and opened his own studio in Oak Park, Illinois. Frank Lloyd Wright was one of a number of emerging architects who were part of a movement that Marion Mahony called The Chicago Group and later came to be known as the Prairie School.

The Chicago Group espoused Louis Sullivan's credo, "form follows function," which became evident in their work, hallmarks of which include: a close relationship of the building to the landscape, an openness and informality of the floor plans, large overhangs on the exterior structure, a use of horizontal bands and clustered windows and a restrained use of conventionalized forms from nature as a harmonious ornamental theme throughout each building. Also evident were the influences of Japanese architecture and the English Arts and Crafts movement.

An early researcher and author on the Prairie Period was Grant Carpenter Manson, who interviewed several of the Oak Park Studio members in 1939 and 1940, and wrote that in the studio Roberts worked as "bookkeeeper and general factotum" who "did occasionally try her hand at design and worked on some of the detail-drawings of her own house". Further clarification of Isabel Robert's role in the Oak Park Studio comes from Wright's son John Lloyd Wright, who observed first-hand the contributions made by Roberts and others in the Oak Park studio. John Lloyd Wright relates that William Drummond, Francis Barry Byrne, Walter Burley Griffin, Albert McArthur, Marion Mahony, Isabel Roberts and George Willis were the draftsmen. He further clarifies that they made up the five men and two women who each were making valuable contributions to Prairie style architecture for which Wright became famous.

Isabel Roberts has been described by Wright scholars as Frank Lloyd Wright's secretary, bookkeeper or office manager. What many have missed is that, like all employees at the time, she contributed to the lively and creative design atmosphere of the Studio. Wright biographer Brendan Gill calls Roberts "the office manager of the Oak Park studio". Similarly, Diane Maddex labels "Isabel Roberts, the office manager of his studio in neighboring Oak Park." David A. Hanks manages only the term "secretary" to describe Roberts' role. So, too, biographer Meryle Secrest defines Roberts' roll simply as: "Isabel Roberts, secretary". H. Allen Brooks skirts the issue with "Isabel Roberts, on the staff." This is consistent with Frank Lloyd Wright's writing about the Oak Park "...studio adjoining my home, where the work I had then to do enabled me to take in several draughtsmen and a faithful secretary, Isabel Roberts..." Grant Carpenter Manson wrote "Isabel Roberts, for whom one of the most celebrated Prairie Houses was built in River Forest in 1908, was not an architect; she was bookkeeper and general factotum at The Studio..." Manson's information was incomplete and inaccurate, as shown in the reference letter Wright wrote for Roberts in 1921, as noted below.

Melenaie Birk says Roberts was "a bookkeeper and assisted with drafting in Wright's Oak Park studio". Roxanne Williamson wrote: "Isabel Roberts managed the office but also seems to have done some drafting." Henry Russell Hitchcock and Edgar Kaufmann, Jr., writing 45 and 55 years later, "Isabel Roberts, one of the drafters in his office". Notably, Thomas A. Heinz presents his view of Isabel Roberts' work while in Wright's employ, saying, "She was an architect in her own right and her talent and position in Wright's Oak Park office has been largely ignored and underestimated."

Isabel Roberts also produced some original designs for the leaded art glass windows in the Prairie houses. Among the light-screens she is known to have designed are those in the Harvey P. Sutton House in McCook, Nebraska. Charles E. White, Jr., who wrote valuable letters about his time as an architect in the Oak Park Studio, said that Roberts worked on ornamental glass in the spring of 1904, a time when the following projects were underway: Darwin D. Martin House, Burton J. Westcott House, Mrs. Thomas Gale House, Robert M. Lamp House and Unity Temple. The "light screens" in these may owe their design in part or in full to Roberts. Isabel Roberts is remembered by her extended family, today, as an architect.

More so than other Studio employees, Roberts was often part of the Wright family circle and was frequently a babysitter for their increasingly large family of six children. Photographs taken by Frank Lloyd Wright in front of the Frank Lloyd Wright Home and Studio show her with his wife Catherine, the children, his mother Anna and sister Maginel. Isabel Roberts and Catherine Lee Tobin Wright were exact contemporaries.

While she was in Wright's employ, Roberts and her mother commissioned a house from Wright's studio, which is known as the Isabel Roberts House, in the Chicago suburb of River Forest. Some scholars contend that it is based on an unbuilt commission for Joshua Melson in Mason City, Iowa. The Isabel Roberts House was designed by Isabel Roberts, per her own statement, even though it has always been attributed to Wright, out of whose studio it emerged. The house was designed for Isabel and Mary Roberts to share, which they did for a decade before leaving Illinois. Also, according to her own statement, while in Wright's employ, Roberts designed the K. C. DeRhodes House in South Bend, Indiana, for her South Bend friend, Laura Caskey Bowsher DeRhodes.

After Wright went off to Europe with Mamah Borthwick Cheney in 1909, Isabel Roberts was among the remaining Oak Park Studio employees working to complete Wright's unfinished commissions. Wright had arranged for architect Hermann V. von Holst to oversee the work; he, with Studio employees Isabel Roberts and John Van Bergen, as well as Marion Mahoney and Walter Burley Griffin (who were by this time no longer employees but working under contract), brought what work they could to completion—much of it modified to Marion's designs. Then Roberts literally locked the doors of the Oak Park Studio, thus closing the productive Oak Park years of Wright's career. Roberts worked for William Drummond for about a year. During that time, the following works were on the boards: Ralph S. Baker House (1914–1915), 1226 Ashland Avenue, Wilmette, IL; John A. Klesert House (1915), Keystone Avenue, River Forest IL; First Congregational Church (1915), 5701 West Midway Park, Chicago, IL 60644.

== Orlando, Florida ==
Isabel Roberts and her family, accompanied by members of the William Drummond family, were visitors to St. Cloud, Florida, as early as the winter of 1915. Roberts and her mother Mary moved to St. Cloud a decade after the Isabel Roberts House was completed. Mary Roberts was in failing health due to the lingering effects of influenza. Roberts's sister Charlotte and her husband John B. Somerville were by that time established residents of St. Cloud. Mary Roberts died in St. Cloud, Florida, on August 16, 1920.

Once in Florida, Isabel Roberts went into architectural practice with Ida Annah Ryan, who was the first woman in the United States to earn a master's degree in architecture, from MIT. As the firm of "Ryan and Roberts", they were among no more than a dozen architecture firms active in Orlando in the 1920s. Their business is listed under the heading "Architects" as "Ryan and Roberts" in the 1926 and in the 1927 Orlando City Directories, at 240 S. Orange St. and the Kenilworth Terrace address. One of only 10 architectural firms listed in 1926, the others including: Frank L. Bodine, Fred E. Field, David Hyer, Murry S. King, George E. Krug, Howard M. Reynolds, Frederick H. Trimble and Percy P. Turner. And one of 12 firms so listed in Orlando in 1927, which included Maurice E. Kressly.

Soon after arriving in Florida, Roberts attempted to become a member of the Florida chapter of the American Institute of Architects. Letters of recommendation from John Van Bergen, Hermann V. von Holst and Frank Lloyd Wright which accompanied her application make it unmistakably clear that these men who had been her colleagues in Chicago considered Roberts to be an architect. Even so, Roberts was not admitted to the AIA. Nonetheless, throughout the 1920s, the architectural firm of Ryan and Roberts created landmark buildings in Central Florida, some of which still stand, today:

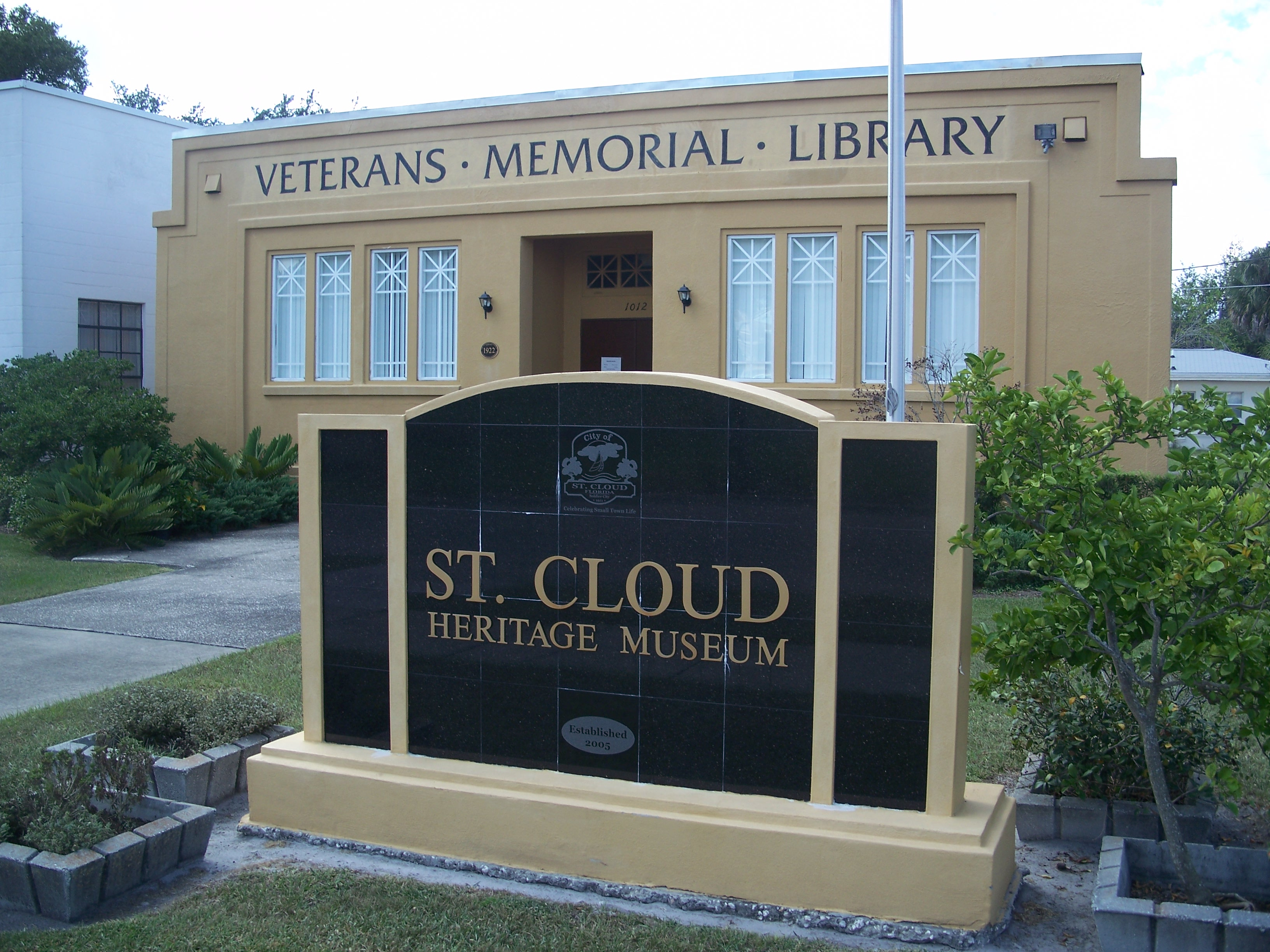
Veterans Memorial Library

Amherst Apartments

- Veterans Memorial Library, 1012 Massachusetts Ave., St. Cloud, Florida. Isabel Roberts' brother-in-law, John B. Somerville, served on the building committee, a connection which resulted in Ryan and Roberts obtaining this commission. In 1922, an outline of what was desired was laid before architects Miss Ida Annah Ryan and Miss Isabel Roberts of Orlando. The plans submitted by them were subsequently accepted. The architects insisted on a motto. Carlyle's, "The true university is a collection of books," was chosen. The building, although described as of Grecian style is in fact reminiscent of the designs of many of the Prairie School small bank buildings of the upper Midwest by Louis Sullivan, William Gray Purcell and George Grant Elmslie, Frank Lloyd Wright and others. It is constructed of hollow tile with stained stucco exterior and is well cared for and in daily use today. It now houses the St. Cloud Heritage Museum. The building is currently owned by the City of St. Cloud; however, the museum is operated solely by volunteers of the Woman's Club of St. Cloud.
- Amherst Apartments, 325 West Colonial Drive, Orlando, Florida. The Amherst Apartments were, for many years, Orlando's most prestigious apartment address. Designed by Ida A. Ryan and Isabel Roberts in the Prairie Style and built in 1921-1922, it featured forty-seven apartments situated on the south shore of Lake Concord. The building closely resembles the design for the German Embassy Building (1915) by William Eugene Drummond; Roberts worked for Gunzel and Drummond in 1915. The Amherst Apartments were demolished in 1986.
- Tourist Club House, 700 Indiana Ave., St. Cloud, Florida. This club house for the Tourist Club of St. Cloud was opened in the city park on December 3, 1923. Designed by Ida Annah Ryan and Isabel Roberts, it shows the influence of the Prairie School with which Roberts was associated, as a rectangular structure with a barrel-roofed auditorium. Frank Lloyd Wright's Oak Park Studio developed this style with open, airy plans, low-pitched hip or gable roofs, horizontal brick walls, exposed rafter ends, broad overhanging eaves and grouped wood windows. The building was torn down circa 2005.
- The Ryan/Roberts Home and Studio, 834 Kenilworth Terrace, Orlando, Florida (private). Ryan and Roberts designed this Mediterranean Revival style home and adjoining studio for their own use in 1920–24. The stucco structure with gable roof is in a simplified Mediterranean revival style. The former studio faces the street. Details of the design include asymmetrical window placements, decorative attic vents, side yard orientation and gently scalloped corner buttresses.
- The Chapel at the Fisk Funeral Home, 1107-1111 Massachusetts Avenue, St. Cloud. A Prairie meets Spanish Revival style building with pointed arch arcades and a second-floor string of grouped windows.
- The Pennsylvania Hotel Building, 10th Street between Pennsylvania Ave. and Florida Avenue, St. Cloud, Florida. The building now houses the St. Cloud Twin Theatres.
- The Peoples Bank Building, southeast corner of 10th Street and New York Avenue, St. Cloud, Florida. The bank failed in the late Twenties; the building is now used as a cafe and barber shop.
- The St. Cloud Presbyterian Church (demolished) was a Mediterranean Revival remodeling of the church building, designed by Ryan and Roberts in the early 1920s. Isabel Roberts was a member of this congregation. Photos of this remodeling may be seen in the St. Cloud Heritage Museum.
- Ross E. Jeffries Elementary School, 1200 Vermont Avenue, St. Cloud, Florida, circa 1926; Though positive documentation has been lost to time, records show that the designers of the Mediterranean Revival style school's original building may have been Ryan & Roberts. The building is distinguished by an arched porch in the offset tower main entry and a low profile accentuated by a curved parapet roofed bay. The facade consists chiefly of large tri-part Chicago style windows, with small end windows as accents.
- Lester M. Austin, Sr. Residence, 541 North Boyd Street, Winter Garden, Florida, circa 1927. A large Mediterranean Revival stucco house with tile roof and tripartite arched windows. The Austin Residence is well-maintained and remains in private hands.
- The Fraser Residence, Orlando, Florida (private). A spacious, elegant Mediterranean Revival stucco mansion situated on one of Orlando's secluded lakes, the Fraser Residence is well-maintained and remains in private hands. Ryan and Roberts' freedom with window shapes and placement is particularly evident in this house, as is their use of round-headed French doors and similar windows, without any 45-degree angle dividers and with the two half-circle segments on each side. It was a popular device with the firm and might be thought of as one of their "trademarks". This home served as Orlando Opera Guild's 1988 Designers' Show House.
- Unity Chapel, Orlando (demolished). For many years, this charming building, in a stuccoed English vernacular style, was the worship home of First Unitarian Church of Orlando, near Lake Eola. Ida Annah Ryan was a member of this congregation. Some scholars have had a hard time identifying this building, which Roberts listed on her AIA application. It is not to be confused with Frank Lloyd Wright's famous Unity Temple in Oak Park, Illinois.
- Lake Eola Bandstand (built 1924, demolished) Cantilevered hip roof over lozenge shaped deck, with distinctive Prairie Style lamps on the entrance bridge stairs.

Additional residential and commercial structures by Ryan and Roberts continue to be identified as current owners become more aware of the significance of the contributions these women made to the field of architecture.

Isabel Roberts was a member of the St. Cloud Presbyterian Church (another of their commissions, a remodeling of an older structure, it is now demolished) until she moved from St. Cloud to Orlando in the early 1920s, at which time she joined First Presbyterian Church of Orlando.

Isabel Roberts and Ida Annah Ryan lived and practiced at their Kenilworth home and studio in Orlando for the remainder of their lives. Isabel Roberts died in Orlando on December 27, 1955 at the age of 84, and was buried in Greenwood Cemetery, Orlando, alongside her mother Mary Roberts and her sister Charlotte Roberts Somerville. Roberts' grave was marked by a commemorative headstone in March, 2016.

== See also ==
- Women in architecture
