= Murry S. King =

American architect

- Born: July 13, 1870; East Deer Township, Pennsylvania, US
- Died: September 20, 1925 (aged 55); Orlando, Florida, US
- Occupation: Architect

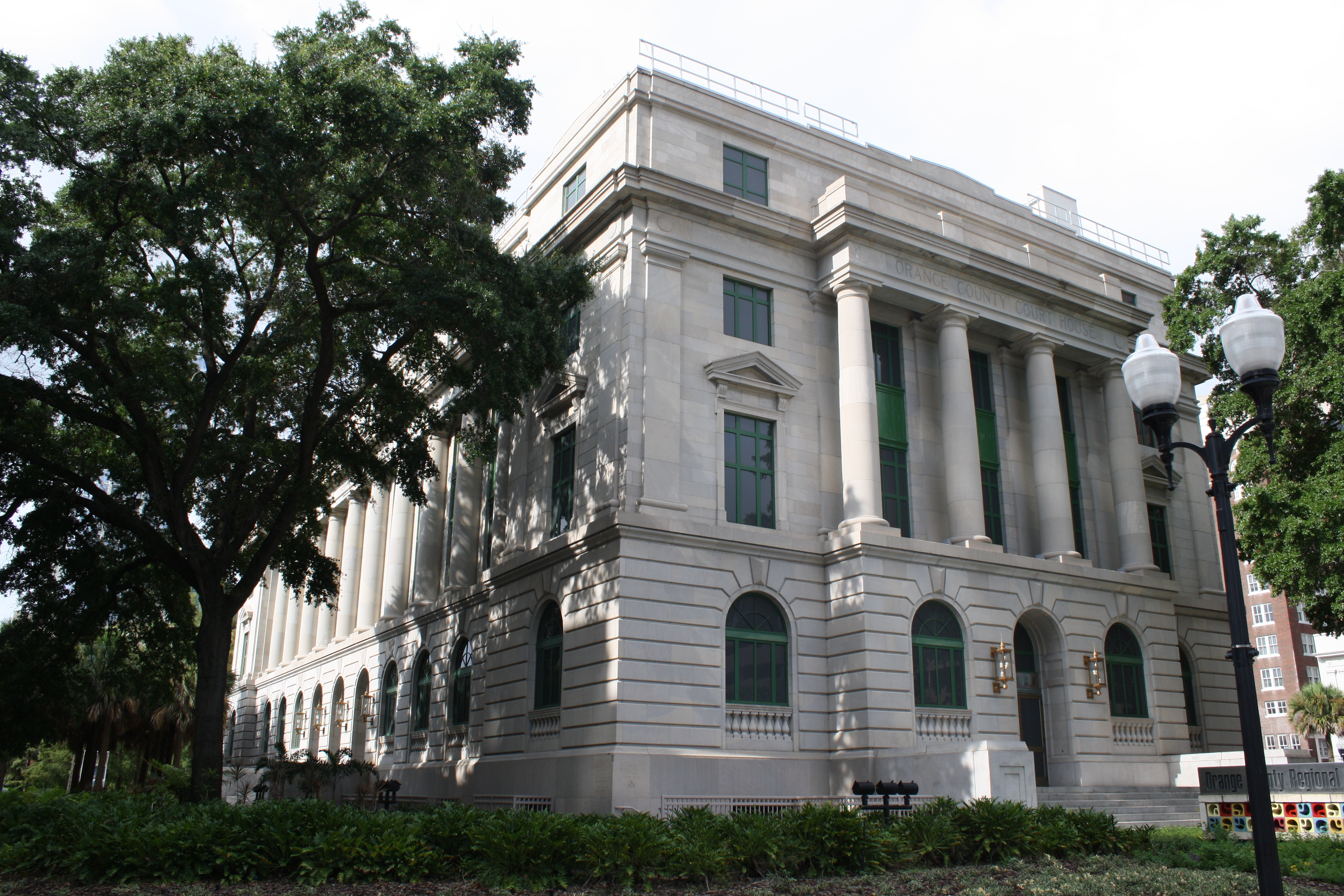
County Courthouse, Orlando, 1927.

Murry S. King (1870–1925) (often spelled "Murray") was Florida's first registered architect, a noted American architect with a successful practice in Orlando, Florida, in the 1910s and 1920s.

== Life and career ==
King was born on July 13, 1870, in East Deer Township, Allegheny County, Pennsylvania, near Pittsburgh, the son of Robert and Mary King. He moved to Orlando from Pennsylvania in 1904.

King was a charter member of the Florida State Association of Architects and served on the Florida State Board of Architecture. He was a member of the American Institute of Architects.

In 1890 Murry S. King married Ruth Ann ("Anna") Riley Dible. Their children were: Leroy (1890), Florence (1893), James B. (1894), Murry Jr (1896), Merrit (1896), and Edward (1901), Pearl (1903), all of whom were born in Pennsylvania. His son, James B. King entered into his architectural practice in the mid-1920s.

Mr. King's first name appears both as "Murry" and "Murray" in contemporary sources and in Orlando histories. It is spelled "Murray" in contemporary references such as his business listing in many issues of The Winter Park Post and Orlando telephone directories, as well as the excellent photograph and brief biographical sketch of "Murray S. King". However, a photograph of downtown Orlando with the sign outside his office, recently found by Orlando historians Joy Wallace Dickinson and Rick Kilby, shows the spelling as "Murry".

Murry S. King died in Orlando on September 20, 1925.

== Legacy ==
From offices in Rooms 22 and 23 of the Watkins Block in Orlando, King designed primarily in the Neo-Classical, Spanish Revival, Renaissance Revival and Prairie Style. King is noted for civic buildings, the best known of which may be his last completed work, the Orange County Courthouse building; this is now the headquarters of the Orange County Regional History Center (1927). Constructed from variegated Indiana limestone from the Clear Creek Quarries of the Indiana Limestone Company, the completion of the building was supervised by Murry S. King's son, James B. King.

King was the recognized leading architect among a group of architectural firms in Orlando in the 1920s. The others included: Frank L. Bodine, Fred E. Field, Frederick H. Trimble, David Hyer, George E. Krug, Howard M. Reynolds, Ryan and Roberts (Ida Annah Ryan and Isabel Roberts) and Percy P. Turner. This group of architects was quite intentional about creating in Central Florida a style of architecture that was suited to the region. Here is how they described it in an article from The Florida Circle of May 1924:

"Just as architects of old created styles to harmonize with their environment, so have the architects of Florida been creating, from native motifs, a style that is carefully adapted to the climatic conditions and surroundings of the state. This style has an individuality all its own and should have a fitting name to express its origins . . . The Florida Association of Architects will give a prize of $25.00 for the name selected." Submissions were to be sent to King; the contest was to conclude in November 1924 and the winning name announced thereafter.

== Architectural works ==
- Wescot Beardall House, 214 S. Lucerne Circle, Orlando - 1912
- Yowell-Duckworth (later Ivey's) Department Store Building,1 South Orange Avenue, Orlando, FL – 1913
- First Presbyterian Church, Orlando, FL – 1914
- Robert McDonald Residence, Winter Park, Fl – before 1915
- Tiedkie Residence, Magnolia Avenue, Orlando, FL – before 1915
- Astor Hotel, 215-217 S. Orange Ave., Orlando, FL – before 1915
- Grand Theater, Orlando, FL – before 1915
- Seth B. Woodruff Residence, 236 S. Lucerne Circle, Orlando FL – 1916
- Phillips Theater, 23-19 S. Orange Ave., Orlando, FL - 1916
- H.M. Beardall House, 700 Euclid Ave., Orlando, FL - 1920
- C. J. Early Residence (demolished), 711 Main Ln., Orlando, FL - 1920
- L. M. Autrey Residence, 108 Hillcrest Avenue, Orlando, FL - 1921
- Athens Theater, 124 N. Florida Avenue, DeLand, Florida – 1921-1922
- Angebilt Hotel (now offices and retail space), 37 North Orange Avenue, Orlando, FL - 1921-1923
- Watkins Block offices, Orlando, FL - before 1923
- Hotel Wyoming - additions, 424 Magnolia Avenue, Orlando, FL – 1923
- State Bank and Trust Company Building (One North Orange), Orlando FL - 1923
- Albertson Public Library, 165 E Central Avenue, Orlando, FL – 1923
- Park Lake Presbyterian Church, 309 E Colonial Dr., Orlando, FL - 1924
- Rose Building, 49 North Orange Avenue, Orlando, FL - 1924
- Orange County Courthouse (now Orange County Regional History Center); 65 E. Central Blvd., Orlando FL - 1926-7
- 803 Lake Adair Blvd., Orlando - 1926
- 729 Alameda Street, Orlando - 1927
