= Fellsmere Public School =

- U.S. National Register of Historic Places
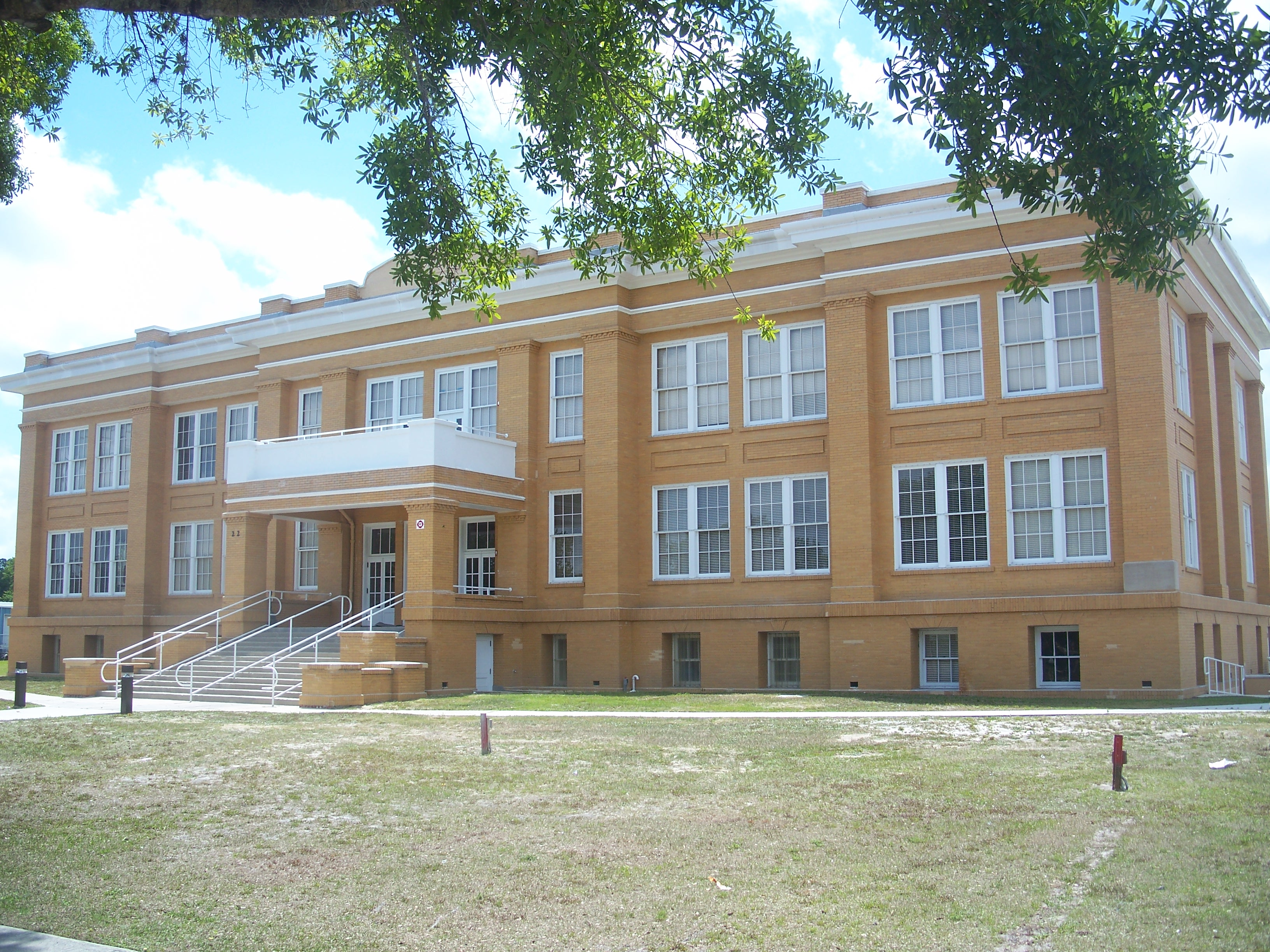

- Location within Florida Location within the United States
- Location: 22 S. Orange St., Fellsmere, Florida
- Coordinates: 27°46′01″N 80°36′10″W
- Architect: Frederick H. Trimble
- Architectural style: Masonry Vernacular
- MPS: Fellsmere MPS
- NRHP reference No.: 96001368
- Added to NRHP: November 22, 1996

The Fellsmere Public School is a historic school in Fellsmere, Florida. It is located at 22 South Orange Street. On November 22, 1996, it was added to the U.S. National Register of Historic Places.
