= George E. Krug =

American architect

George Edward Krug (also known as Jorge Krug) was an American architect who practiced in Greater New York City (from Orange, New Jersey), São Paulo, Brazil and Orlando, Florida.

== Biography ==
George Edward Krug was born in 1869 in Brazil, the son of Jean and Ida B. Krug (d. May 4, 1904). His father Jean Krug – a commission merchant of Prussian ancestry – had been born in Brazil, in 1842; his mother Ida, in Hamburg, Germany, in 1846. As a child, Krug lived in New York City. The family was well to do, they employed a governess for George as well as having other live-in servants.

George Krug graduated from Lafayette College in Easton, Pennsylvania, in the class of 1884. He went on to study architecture in Philadelphia, at the Fine Arts Institute of the University of Pennsylvania.

Thereafter he spent more than a decade in São Paulo, Brazil, starting in 1889. There, he collaborated with other architects including, Maximiliano Emilio Hehl. Painter Anita Malfatti (1889-1964) was his niece.

Upon his return to the United States, Krug maintained an architectural practice with offices on Broadway and in Orange, NJ, designing buildings in the greater New York City area. Krug was the architect of the Hyde Park Club House and many residential properties in East Orange, NJ. He was also one of the select group of architects who designed buildings for the planned suburban community of ‘’Livingston Manor’’ in Highland Park, NJ. This development consisted of architect-designed homes in various styles: Queen Anne houses, Bungalows, Foursquares, and Colonial Revival houses with embellishments typical of the Craftsman era philosophy, which emphasized the value of the labor of skilled artisans who showed pride in their abilities.

By 1919 George E. Krug relocated to Florida. He is listed as an architect in Orlando, Florida, in the report of the Florida Office of the Secretary of State of that year. Krug designed numerous grand houses and mansions in the Late-revival styles, whereby each residence conveyed academic qualities, while having unique characteristics. Fine examples of Krug's Late-revival styles like Federal, Georgian, Greek, and American Tudor are evident throughout downtown Orlando, particularly in the Lake Cherokee and Lake Copeland-designated historic districts, and the nearby city of Winter Park. Brick facades, Ionic fluted columns, Gothic Revival and Palladian style windows and doors are uniquely characterized on the homes of Krug's designs. Positioning houses on a slight angle to their site plan was also a common theme of his. As such, Krug was among less than a dozen architects in Orlando at that time. The others include: Frank L. Bodine, Fred E. Field, David Hyer, Murry S. King, Howard M. Reynolds, Frederick H. Trimble, Ryan and Roberts (Ida Annah Ryan and Isabel Roberts) and Percy P. Turner.

George E. Krug and his wife Clara L. Krug were associated with the St. John's Episcopal Church in Kissimmee, Florida, where Mrs. Krug was for some time the superintendent of the church school. George E. Krug died in Orlando, Florida in 1939.

== Architectural Work - Partial Listing ==
- Igreja Bom Jesus do Bras, São Paulo, Brazil - 1896-1903
- "Asylo de Meninas Orphans e Desemparadas N.S. Auxiliadora do Ipiranga" São Paulo, Brazil− - 1896
- Andrew Murray store building, East Orange, New Jersey - 1902
- Hyde Park Club House, East Orange, NJ – circa 1905
- Watchung Heights, West Orange, NJ
- Livingston Manor, houses, Highland Park, New Jersey - 1906
- Roosevelt Park development in South Orange, NJ (now Maplewood, NJ) 1913, 1916
- Dr. and Mrs. McEwan Mansion, 705 Delaney Avenue, Orlando, Florida- 1922 Late-Greek Revival style
- Phillip Slemons House, 339 Cherokee Drive, Orlando, Florida- 1924 Late-American Tudor Revival style
- Howard House, 502 Palmer Street House, Orlando, Florida- 1924 Late-Georgian Revival style
- A.T. Carter House, 627 Cherokee Circle, Orlando, Florida- 1927 Late-Greek Revival style
- The Estes House, 721 Delaney Avenue, Orlando FL- 1922 Colonial Revival style
