= Lake Wales Historic Residential District =

Historic district in Florida, United States

- U.S. National Register of Historic Places
- U.S. Historic district
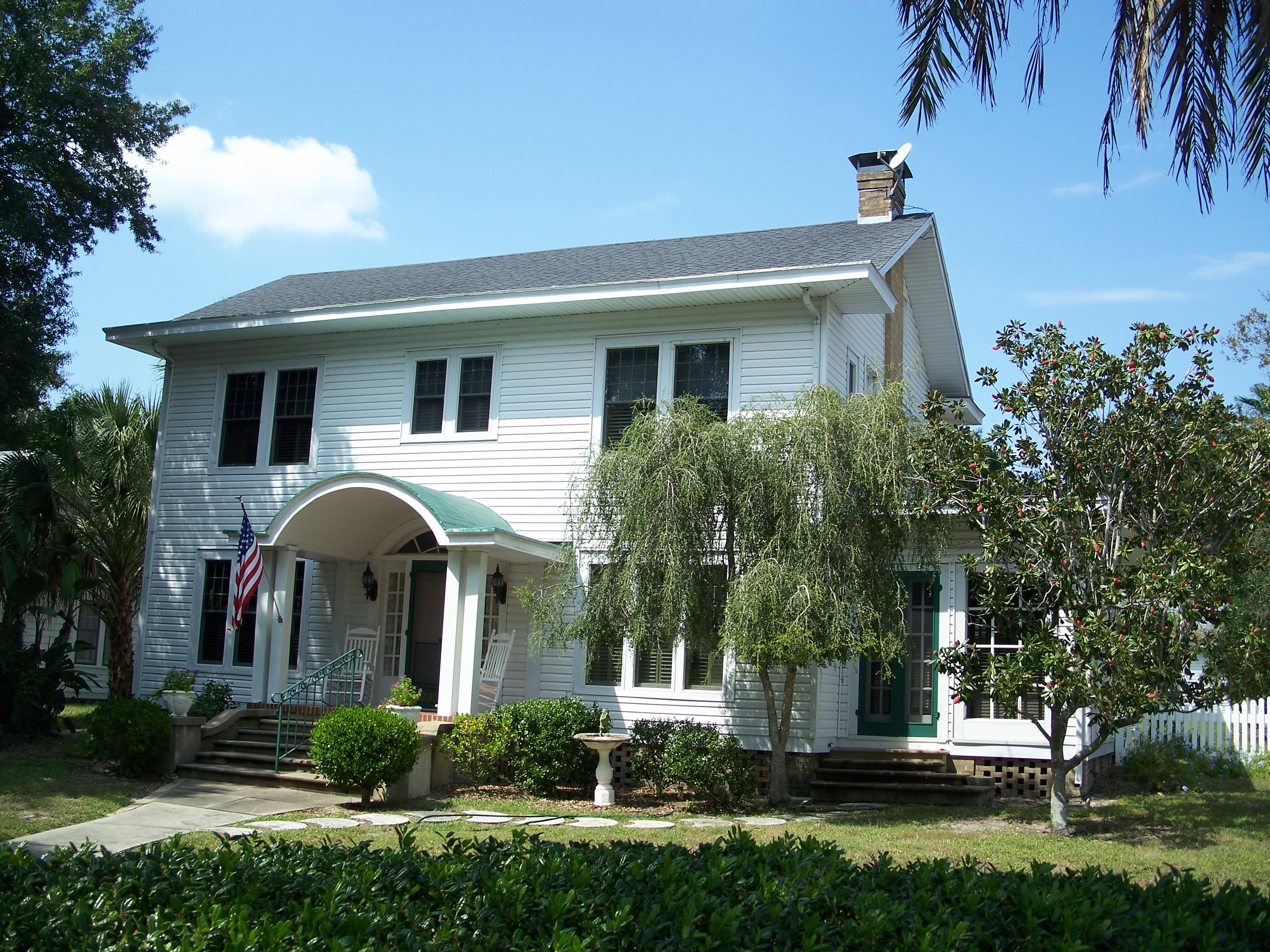

- Location within Florida Location within the United States
- Location: Lake Wales, Florida
- Coordinates: 27°54′13″N 81°35′3″W
- Area: 1,300 acres (5.3 km^{2})
- NRHP reference No.: 97000858
- Added to NRHP: August 8, 1997

The Lake Wales Historic Residential District is a U.S. historic district (designated as such on August 8, 1997) located in Lake Wales, Florida. The district is bounded by the Seaboard Airline RR grade, CSX RR tracks, East Polk Avenue, South and North Lake Shore Boulevards. It contains 206 historic buildings.
