= Andrew B. Murray Vocational School =

- U.S. National Register of Historic Places
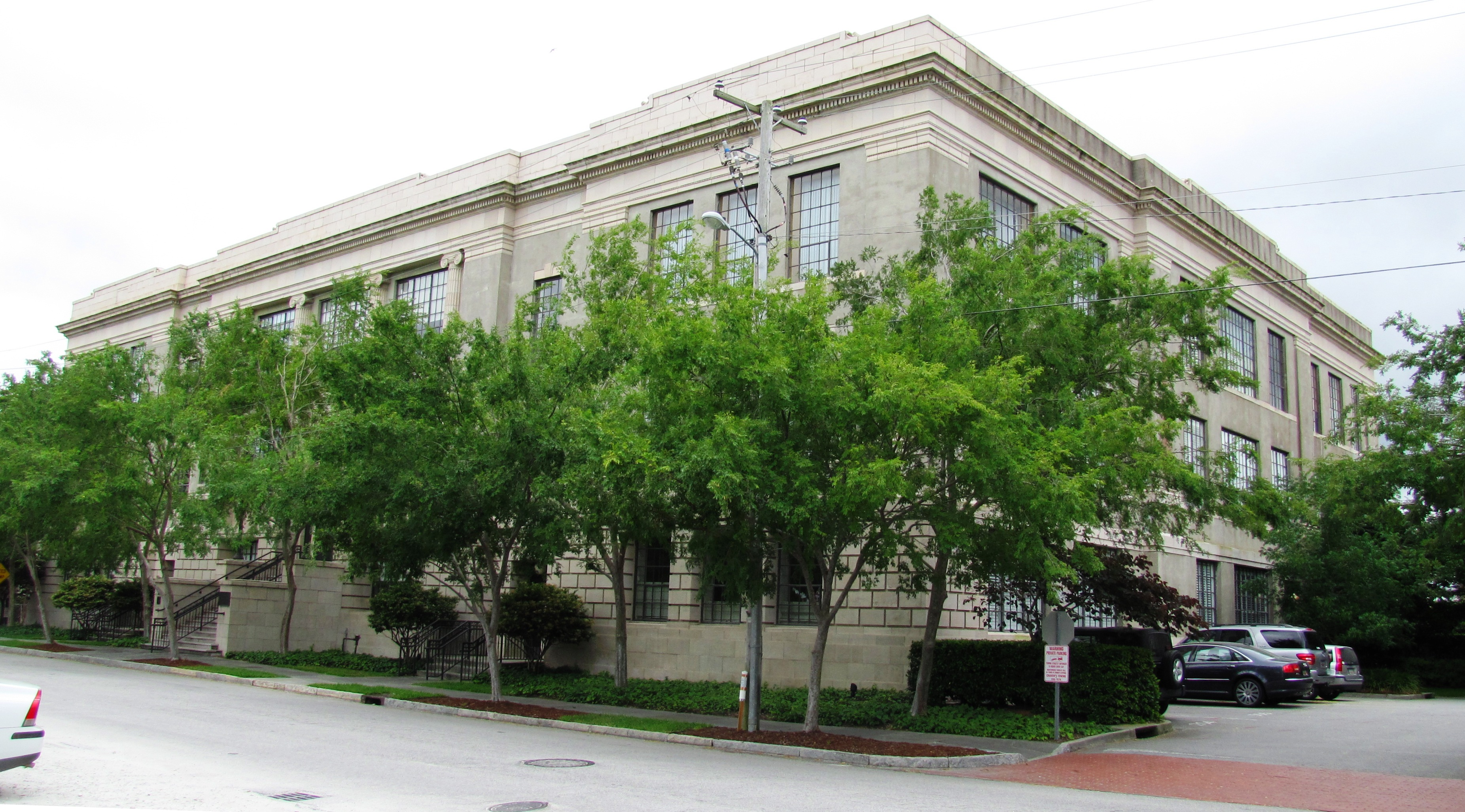
- The school building in 2010

- Location within South Carolina Location within the United States
- Location: 3 Chisolm St., Charleston, South Carolina
- Coordinates: 32°46′26″N 79°56′33″W
- Area: 1.2 acres (0.49 ha)
- Built: 1923
- Architect: David B. Hyer
- Architectural style: Late 19th And 20th Century Revivals
- NRHP reference No.: 02000569
- Added to NRHP: May 30, 2002

The Murray Vocational School is located at 3 Chisolm Street, Charleston, South Carolina. It was named to the National Register of Historic Places in 2002.

The school was built by the City of Charleston and opened in 1923 as the Murray Vocational School, named in honor of philanthropist Andrew Buist Murray. Murray, who had grown up in a Charleston orphanage, financed the construction of the school as his way of repaying the city. David Hyer, a former civil engineer at the Charleston Naval yard, designed the three-story, masonry and steel main building in the Neoclassical Revival style. The building's masonry facade, engaged portico, and fanlighted doorway are all characteristic of the style. The original two-story brick custodian's cottage and a circa 1950 three-story gymnasium complete the facility.

The school closed in 1970 and the property was used by the Charleston County School District as its offices. The building was abandoned by the school district when it completed new headquarters at 75 Calhoun St.

The three buildings were restored and converted into a 27-unit condominium project in the early 2000s. The adaptive reuse was accomplished with only minimal exterior changes. The restoration of the building received a Carolopolis Award from the Preservation Society of Charleston in January 2003.
