= Howard M. Reynolds =

American architect

Howard Montalbert Reynolds, Sr. (June 17, 1885 - October 21, 1943) was an American architect practicing in Orlando, Florida in the 1920s. He designed gracefully proportioned, notable public buildings in the prevailing fashionable styles of the 1920s, including Mediterranean Revival, Colonial Revival, Spanish Colonial, Egyptian Revival, Art Deco and Art Moderne.

Among Reynolds' best known works are a number of educational buildings still in use as schools or community centers in Central Florida. Many of Reynolds' suave, stylish buildings have been designated as Orlando Historic Landmarks.

Reynolds' was among a small but active group of ten architectural firms listed in the Orlando phone directory in 1926, the others including: Frank L. Bodine, Fred E. Field, David Hyer, Murry S. King, George E. Krug, Ryan and Roberts (Ida Annah Ryan and Isabel Roberts) and Percy P. Turner. This group of architects felt it important to create a distinctive regional architecture, an effort which they described in the Florida journal The Florida Circle in 1924 as follows:

"Just as architects of old created styles to harmonize with their environment, so have the architects of Florida been creating, from native motifs, a style that is carefully adapted to the climatic conditions and surroundings of the state. This style has an individuality all its own and should have a fitting name to express its origins . . . The Florida Association of Architects will give a prize of $25.00 for the name selected."

On February 21, 1916, Reynolds married Doris Crandall who was born on January 25, 1896 (died 1978). They were the parents of three children: Marie (Mrs. Harry H. Fetters), Howard M. Jr. (1922-1990) (married Darlene Lentz) and Robert (married Mary Elizabeth Saine).

== Architectural work – partial listing ==
- Howard Middle School (former Orlando High School), 800 East Robinson St., Orlando, Florida - 1926
- Howard M. Reynolds Residence, 104 South Brown Ave., Orlando, Florida - circa 1922 (simplified 2-story Prairie Style)
- Jones High School, 101 North Parramore Avenue, Orlando, Florida – 1922
- First Congregational Church of Winter Park, 225 S Interlachen Ave., Winter Park, Florida - 1924
- Osceola County High School – 1925
- Marks Street School (now, Marks Street Senior Center), 99 East Marks Street, Orlando, Florida -1925
- Winter Park Junior-Senior High School – 1926
- Orange County Chamber of Commerce, 113 East Central Boulevard, Orlando, Florida – 1926
- Osceola County Courthouse, remodeling – 1926
- Grand Avenue Elementary School, 800 Grand Avenue, Orlando, Florida - 1926
- Princeton Elementary School, 311 W. Princeton St., Orlando, Florida - 1926
- Cherokee Junior High School; 500 South Eola Drive, Orlando, Florida – 1927
- Howard M. Reynolds Residence, 204 South Brown Ave., Orlando, Florida - circa 1928 (2 story Colonial Revival)
- Kissimmee Band Shell and Community Building, additions and remodeling – 1929 and 1937
- Mann Hall, Pell-Clarke School for Girls (Cathedral School)(demolished) - 1929
- First National Bank Building, 190 South Orange Avenue, Orlando – 1930
- Howard M. Reynolds, Sr., Residence, 1315 Buckingham Road, Winter Park, Florida - 1930 (1-story Cape Cod with detached garage)
- Howard M. Reynolds, Jr., Residence, 1485 Westchester Ave., Winter Park, Florida - n.d.
