= James Gamble Rogers II =

American architect (1901–1990)

James Gamble Rogers II (January 24, 1901 – October 30, 1990) was a celebrated American architect practicing primarily in Winter Park, Florida in the middle years of the twentieth century. He is noted for suavely elegant residential and commercial work, in the Spanish Revival, Mediterranean Revival, French Provincial, and Colonial Revival styles.

His occasional forays into the Art Deco and International Style also garnered outstanding contributions to the built environment.

== Early life ==
Rogers was born on January 24, 1901, in Chicago, Illinois, to John Arthur Rogers and Elizabeth Baird Rogers. His father, as well as his paternal uncle and namesake James Gamble Rogers were both architects. Rogers grew up in Winnetka until his family relocated to Florida when he was in high school. Thereafter, he attended Dartmouth College but returned to Daytona Beach and began work in his father's architecture practice before he could graduate, in 1924.

== Architectural career ==
Between 1924 and 1934, Rogers designed many buildings but because he was not yet a registered architect, during that decade the drawings were signed by his father and by other architects. In 1928 he opened a branch of his father's practice in Winter Park. Following his father's death in 1934, Rogers managed the Orlando office of architect David Hyer. When Hyer returned to Charleston, South Carolina in 1935, Rogers opened his own practice in Winter Park, having successfully passed the Florida Board of Architecture examinations that year.

Throughout the 1930s and 1940s Rogers designed many outstanding commissions, chiefly residential, which were and remain among the most sought after homes in Winter Park and environs. Perhaps his best known of these is the Barbour Residence, also known as "Casa Feliz". The house was built on a site overlooking Lake Osceola in 1932; to save the home from destruction, in 2000 it was moved to its present location and is available for tours and for special event rentals. The home, designed to resemble a Spanish farmhouse, displays many of Roger's aesthetic gifts. Other easily viewed Winter Park commissions include the Greeneda Court shops on Park Avenue, the First Church of Christ Scientist, the Barbour Apartments and the Olin Library on the campus of Rollins College.

Rogers continued to practice architecture until he was in his eighties. Among his later commissions of note is the Greek Revival Florida Supreme Court Building in Tallahassee, of 1948. Rogers died on October 30, 1990 at the home he designed on Temple Grove Avenue, Winter Park.

At least a few of his works have been listed on the National Register of Historic Places (NRHP) for their architecture.

== Architectural work (partial listing) ==
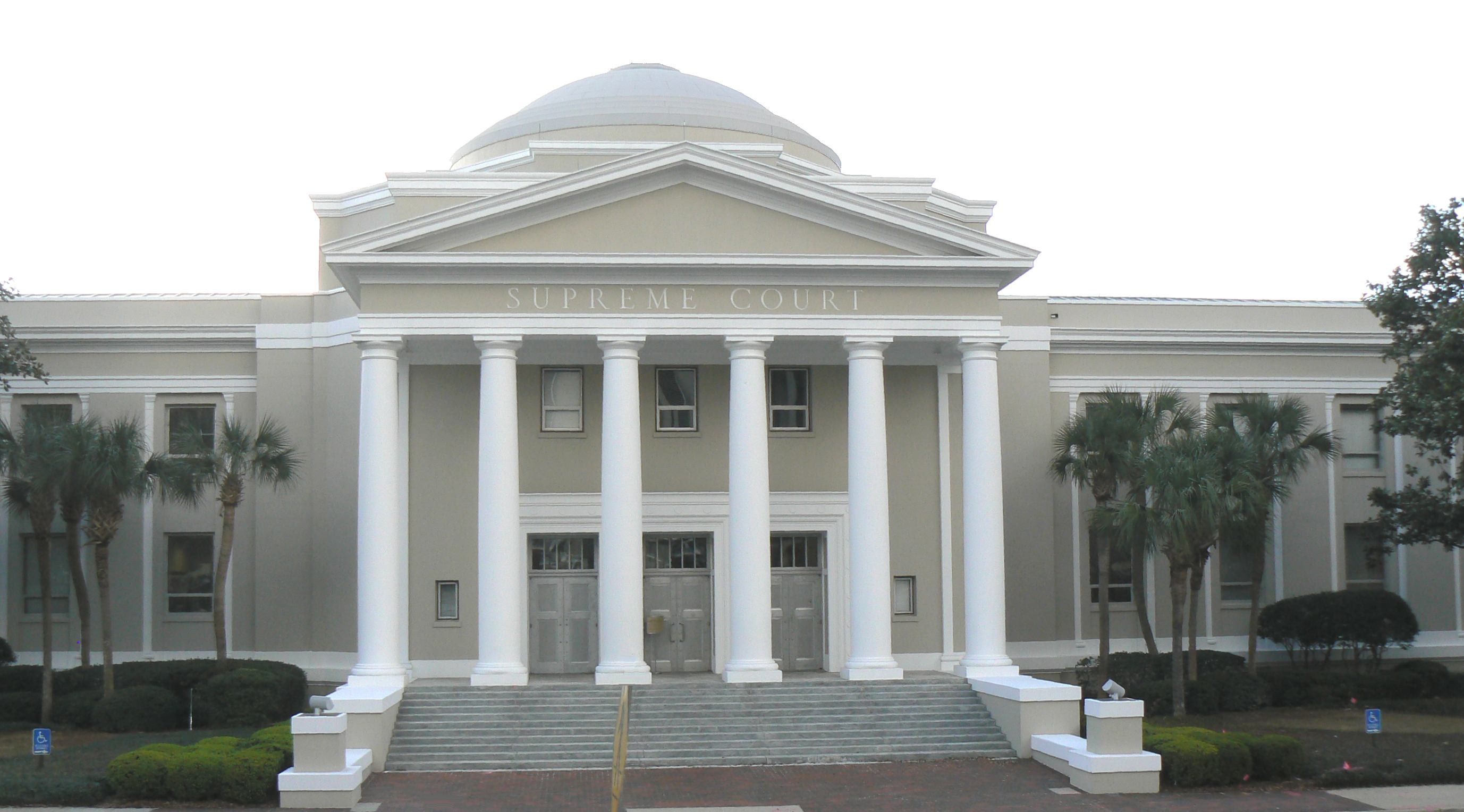
Florida Supreme Court Building

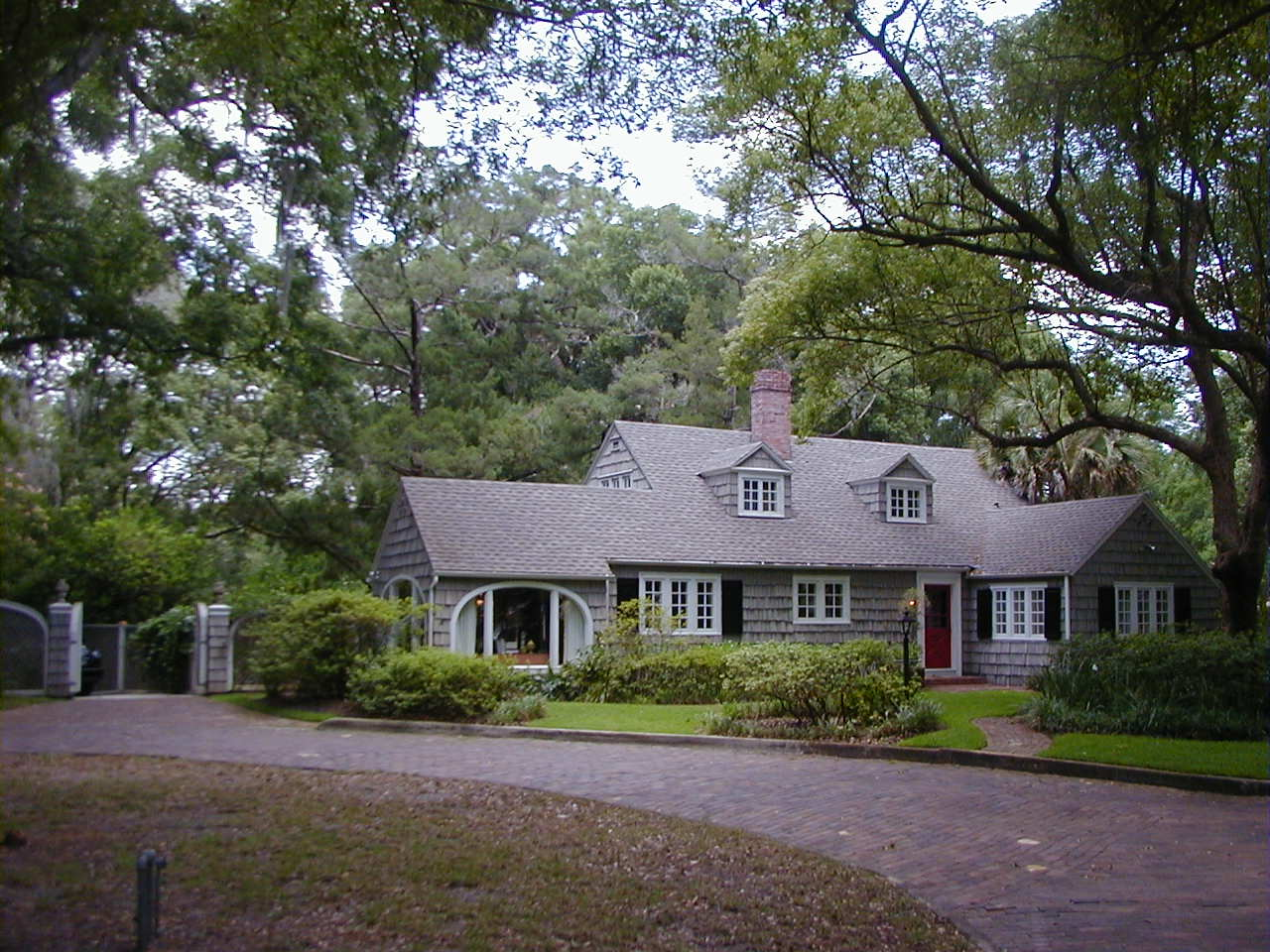
160 Glenridge, Winter Park

- Claybaugh House (1927)
- "Four Winds" (1929), Rogers House I, Isle of Sicily, Winter Park, Fla. His home.
- Shippen House (1931), 1290 North Park Avenue, Winter Park, Fla.
- Robert Bruce Barbour House (1932), "Casa Feliz", Interlachen Avenue, Winter Park, Fla. (relocated 2000 to 656 Park Avenue North), NRHP-listed.
- Ingram House (1932)
- McAllaster House (1934), 160 Alexander Place, Winter Park, Fla.
- John N. Huttig Estate (1934), 435 Peachtree Rd., Orlando, Fla. NRHP-listed.
- the Yergey House (c. 1935)
- Holt House (1937), 1430 Elizabeth Drive, Winter Park, Fla.
- Jewet House (1937), North Park Avenue, Winter Park, Fla.
- Barbour Apartments (1937), 520-540 N. Knowles Ave, Winter Park, Fla.
- McEwan House (c.1938), 407 Peachtree Road, Orlando, Fla., near Lake Concord
- 833 Seville Place (c. 1940)
- Greeneda Court (1945–47), Park Avenue, Winter Park, Fla.
- Mills Library (1948), Rollins College, Winter Park, Fla.
- The Millard Caldwell Building (1947)
- Florida Supreme Court Building (1948), 500 S. Duval St., Tallahassee, Fla.
- The Spessard Holland Building (1949), Tallahassee
- First Methodist Church of Oviedo (1955), 263 King St. Oviedo, Fla. NRHP-listed.
- Carlton Student Union Building (1956) at Stetson University in DeLand, Fla.
- 1329 South Highland Park Drive (1957), Lake Wales, Fla.
- First Church of Christ, Scientist (1958), 186 Whipple Avenue, Winter Park, Fla.
- Academic buildings at Florida State University (1959-1962)
- Academic buildings at Rollins College (1951-1968)
- Olin Library (1986), 1000 Holt Avenue, Rollins College, Winter Park, Fla.
- 1020 Palmer Av. Winter Park, Fla. Rogers' largest residential design
- the R. D. Keene House at 1030 Lake Adair Boulevard.
- 711 Alba Drive Orlando, Fla.
- 160 Glenridge, Winter Park, Fla.
- 490 E Webster Ave, Winter Park, Fla.
- 842 Laurel Ave, Orlando, Fla.
- Author Kate DiCamillo's Childhood Home, 1713 Sunset Drive Clermont, Fla.
- University Club of Winter Park (1948), 841 North Park Ave, Winter Park, Fla.
