= Fred E. Field =

American architect

Providence Home for Aged Men, Providence, RI. 1891–95.

Frederick E. Field (January 7, 1864 – December 31, 1931) was an American architect who practiced in Providence, Rhode Island, and Orlando, Florida, in the period between 1883 and 1927.

In 1883, Field opened his practice in the city of Providence. In 1902, he took his head draftsman, Harry A. Slocomb, as partner in Field & Slocomb. This firm was dissolved in January 1904, with both returning to independent practice. In 1907, he joined noted architect Howard Hoppin (1856–1940) in the firm of Hoppin & Field. This, in turn, became Hoppin, Field & Peirce in 1922, when Thomas J. Hill Peirce joined the firm. This firm was soon dissolved, and the partners went their separate ways. By the mid-1920s, Field had moved to Orlando. He had opened his own practice there by 1926. In 1927, Charles E. Choate, who had been in Orlando since 1925, took him as partner in Choate & Field. This firm appears to have dissolved soon afterward, as Choate moved to Birmingham that same year. The 1929-1930 Providence House Directory shows that Field had returned to Providence. By the time of his death in 1931, Field was once again practicing in Providence.

Field was received into the College of Fellows of the American Institute of Architects in 1889. Field was a member of the Rhode Island Chapter of the AIA from 1888 - 1916, and served as its Vice-President for some period of time circa 1910-1911.

In its online Guide to Providence Architecture, the Providence Preservation Society lists a brief sample of Field's residential architecture.

== Architectural work ==
In private practice, 1883–1902:

- Valentine Germershausen Duplex, 25–27 Adelaide Ave., Providence, RI (1884)
- Atwells Avenue Primary School, 235 Atwells Ave., Providence, RI (1887) – Demolished.
- Veazie Street Primary School, 287 Veazie St., Providence, RI (1887) – Demolished.
- George J. West House, 95 Roanoke St., Providence, RI (1889)
- Peace Street Grammar School, 49 Peace St., Providence, RI (1889) – Demolished.
- Waldo J. Slocomb House, 12 Brighton St., Providence, RI (1889)
- Academy Avenue Grammar School, 38 Academy Ave., Providence, RI (1890) – Demolished.
- Frederick E. Field House, 102 Melrose St., Providence, RI (1890) – The architect's own home.
- Police Station No. 6, 38 Chaffee St., Providence, RI (1890)
- Frederick H. Field House, 144 Lexington Ave., Providence, RI (1891) -- This was the residence of the architect's parents, and later, his own.
- Providence Home for Aged Men, 807 Broad St., Providence, RI (1891–95)
- River Avenue Primary School, 159 River Ave., Providence, RI (1891) – Demolished.
- Roger Williams Park Stable, Roger Williams Park, 1000 Elmwood Ave., Providence, RI (1891) – Now the zoo administration building.
- Valentine Germershausen Duplex, 21–23 Adelaide Ave., Providence, RI (1891)
- Foster N. Gunnison House, 150 Lexington Ave., Providence, RI (1892)
- Manual Training High School, 119 Pond St., Providence, RI (1892) – Demolished.
- Messer Street Grammar School, 158 Messer St., Providence, RI (1892)
- John S. Whitehouse House, 195 Lexington Ave., Providence, RI (1894)
- Dutee Wilcox Building, 180 Washington St., Providence, RI (1895) – Demolished.
- Hendrick Street Primary School, 64 Hendrick St., Providence, RI (1895) – Demolished.
- Ruggles Street Primary School, 110 Ruggles St., Providence, RI (1895)
- Columbia Building, 15 Snow St., Providence, RI (1897)
- Masonic Temple, 127 Dorrance St., Providence, RI (1897)
- John H. Hambly House, 44 Oriole Ave., Providence, RI (1898)
- William R. Tillinghast House, 268 Angell St., Providence, RI (1898)
- John F. Allen House, 40 Oriole Ave., Providence, RI (1899)
- Albert J. Schmid House, 100 Elmgrove Ave., Providence, RI (1900)
- Edmund D. Chesebro House, 421 Elmwood Ave., Providence, RI (1900)
- Walter S. Hough House, 278 Olney St., Providence, RI (1901)

Field & Slocomb, 1902–1904:

- Abbott School, Farmington, ME (1902) – Demolished.

Private practice, 1904–1907:

- America Street Primary School, 22 America St., Providence, RI (1904) – Demolished.
- Regent Avenue Primary School, 101 Regent Ave., Providence, RI (1904)
- Horace G. Peck House, 202 Congress Ave., Providence, RI (1904)
- Mary E. and John A. Boyd House, 200 Congress Ave., Providence, RI (1905)
- Helen A. W. Hudson Duplex, 24–26 President Ave., Providence, RI (1905)
- Helen A. W. Hudson Duplex, 34–36 President Ave., Providence, RI (1907)
