= Warren McArthur =

American furniture designer (1885–1961)

- Born: Warren McArthur, Jr. 1885; Chicago, Illinois, U.S.
- Died: December 1961 (aged 75–76); New York, New York, U.S.
- Education: Cornell University (BS)
- Occupation: Industrial designer
- Known for: Streamline design, art deco design, aluminum tubular furniture, military and civilian aircraft seating
- Spouse: Lorraine McArthur
- Children: Warren McArthur, III, Lorraine McArthur, Louise McArthur
- Relatives: Albert Chase McArthur; Charles McArthur

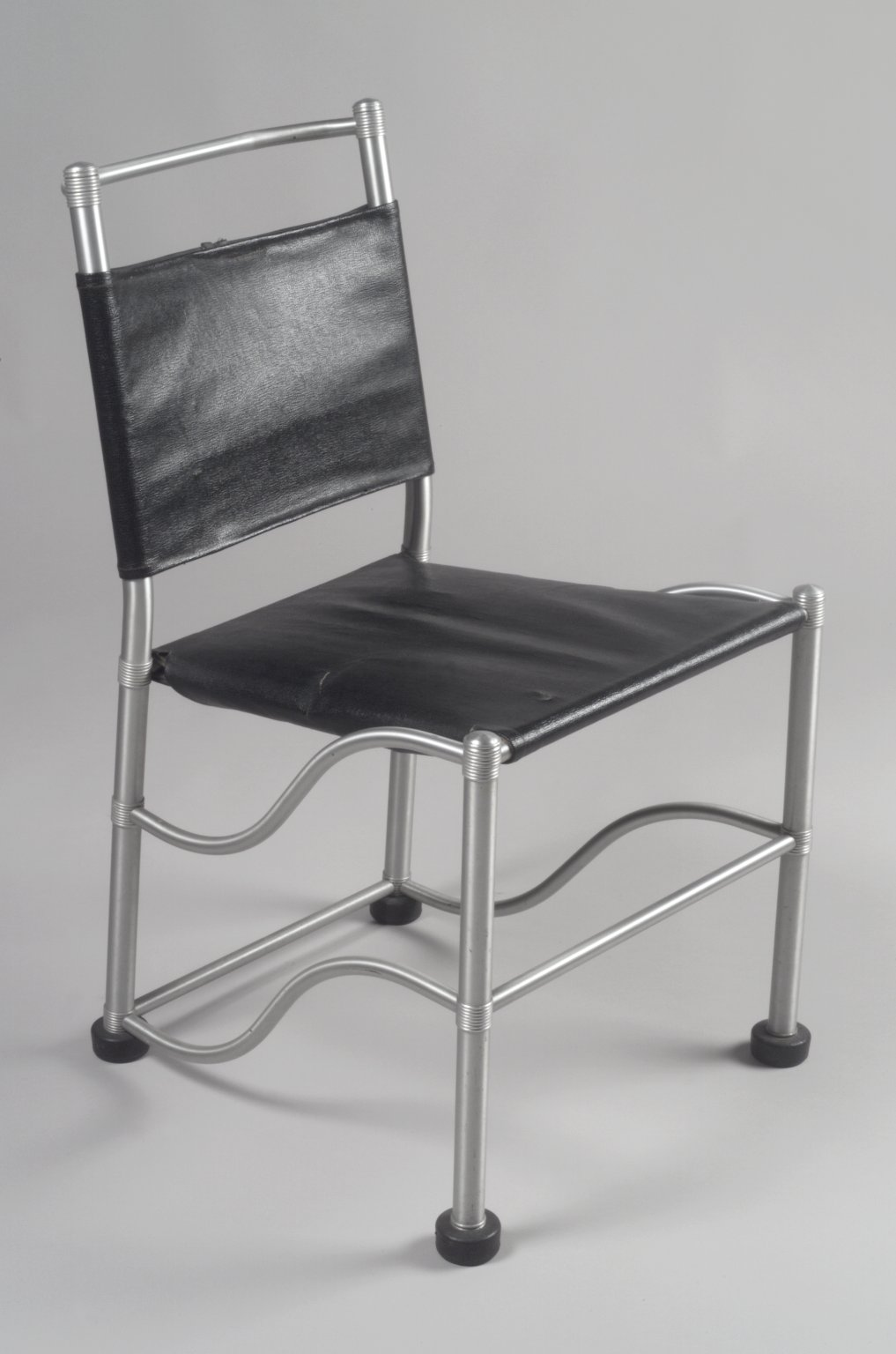
Warren McArthur Corp. Chair, 1935

Warren McArthur (1885–1961) was an American industrial and furniture designer who specialized in aluminum tubular furniture during the 1930s.

== Early life and career ==
Warren McArthur Jr. was born in Chicago, Illinois to Warren McArthur Sr., a successful businessman, and Minnie Jewel McArthur. Frank Lloyd Wright was a friend of the McArthur family. In 1892, Wright designed the house for the McArthur family, located in Chicago.

McArthur attended Cornell University where he studied engineering. In January 1912, McArthur announced his engagement to his future wife Lorraine Peaslee of Dubuque, Iowa.

Shortly after graduating from Cornell, in 1912, McArthur received a patent for the short-globe lamp, which he sold to the Dietz Lantern Company for $2,000.00. The following year, McArthur moved to Phoenix, Arizona with his brother, Charles, and formed the McArthur Brothers Mercantile Company to sell automobiles for Dodge. The brothers also formed KFAD, currently KTAR (AM), the first radio station in Arizona, which began broadcasting in Phoenix on June 21, 1922. In the mid-1920s, the brothers converted a Dodge truck into a RV, that they called the Wonderbus, and gave tours of the Tucson area to tourists, including Sinclair Lewis. On January 4, 1926, Warren McArthur filed a patent for the RV design, called Touring and Camping Road Vehicle, and the patent was granted on March 10, 1931.

== Career in furniture design ==
In the late 1920s, McArthur began his career as an industrial designer by creating furniture for the Arizona Biltmore Hotel, which was designed by his brother Albert Chase McArthur.

After the Wall Street crash of 1929, the Arizona Biltmore failed, and McArthur moved to Los Angeles, California to create a furniture fabrication company. In the early 1930s, aluminum became a popular industrial design material, and McArthur developed a specialization in designing and making aluminum tubular furniture, including chairs, tables, sofas, lamps, and ashtrays.

McArthur soon began to receive commissions from prominent architects. Paul R. Williams commissioned McArthur to design 30 pieces of aluminum furniture for the Cord family who owned the Cord automobile company. He was also commissioned to make aluminum furniture for Rudolph Schindler's design for Sardi's restaurant location in Los Angeles.

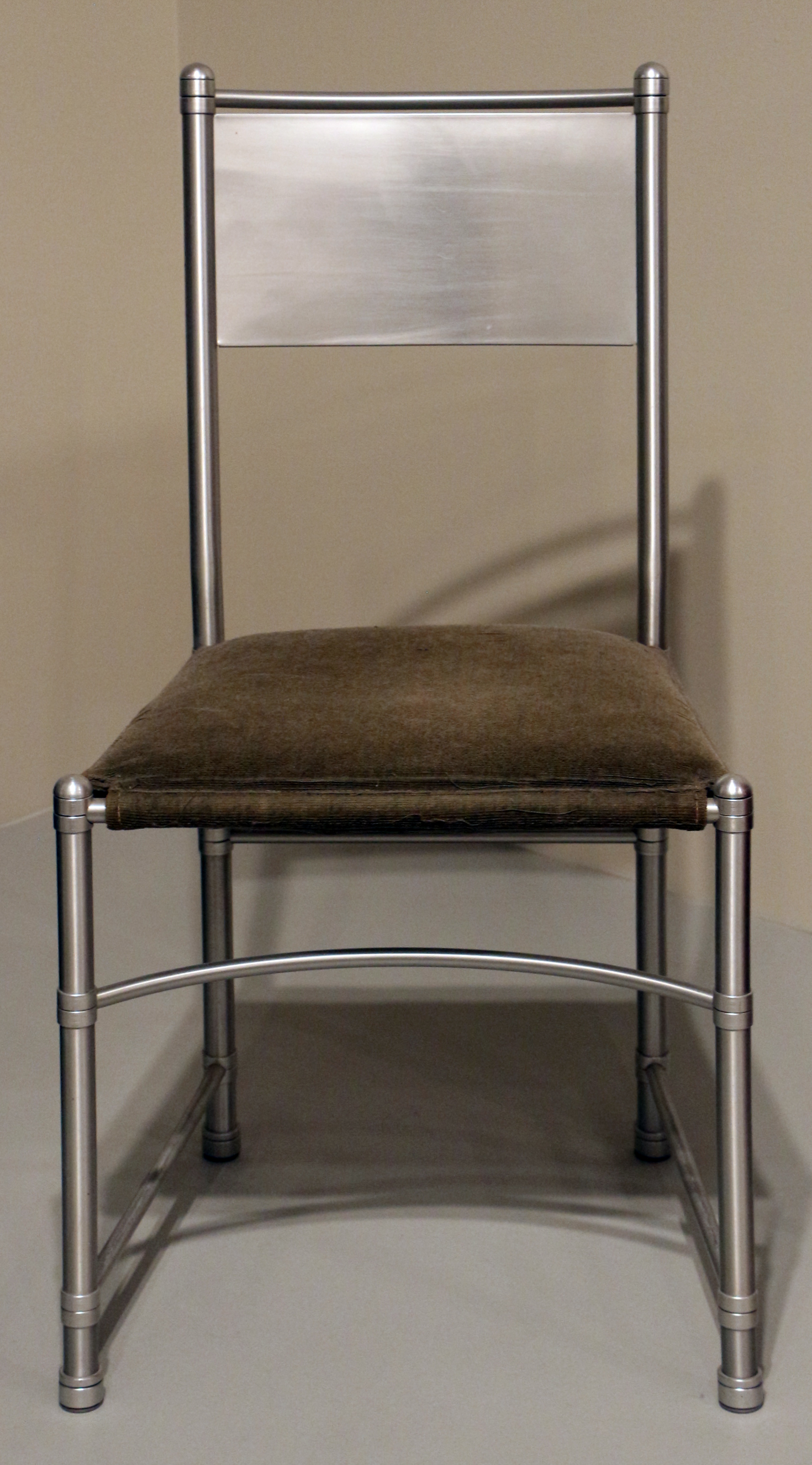
Warren McArthur Corp. Chair, 1936

So too, McArthur's aluminum furniture was popular with Hollywood stars and producers of the 1930s. His clients included Jack L. Warner, Marlene Dietrich, Fredric March, and Clark Gable.

In 1932, McArthur left Los Angeles and established the Warren McArthur Corp. in Rome, New York. He also set up a sales office and showroom in New York City at 1 Park Avenue in 1933.

McArthur's success continued to grow and his furniture "graced the most sophisticated homes, stores and offices in the country." His commissions included Union Pacific Railroad cars, Cunard passenger waiting lounges, Chrysler executive offices, and Marshall Field's department store hair salons. In 1934, Warren McArthur's furniture was exhibited at the Metropolitan Museum of Art's Exhibition of Contemporary American Industrial Art.

During 1937, the Warren McArthur Corp. purchased and moved to a 40,000 square feet factory in Bantam, Connecticut. In 1940, the Virginia State Library purchased McArthur aluminum furniture for its new art deco building, currently the Patrick Henry Building, which remained in the building until the library moved to a new location in 1997. In 1941, McArthur designed furniture for the SS Milwaukee Clipper, which still contains the original McArthur furniture.

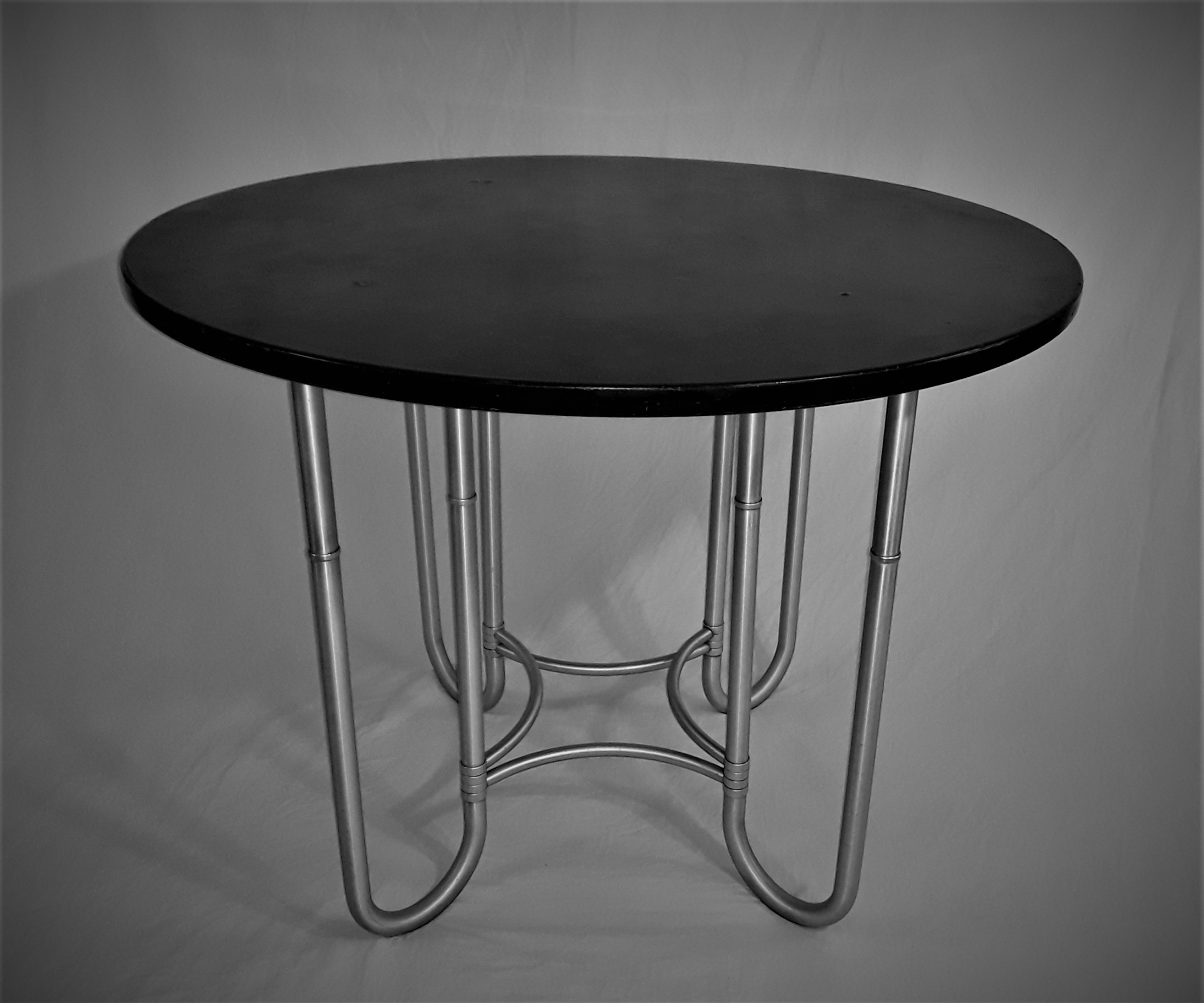
Warren McArthur Corp. Table, ca. 1932

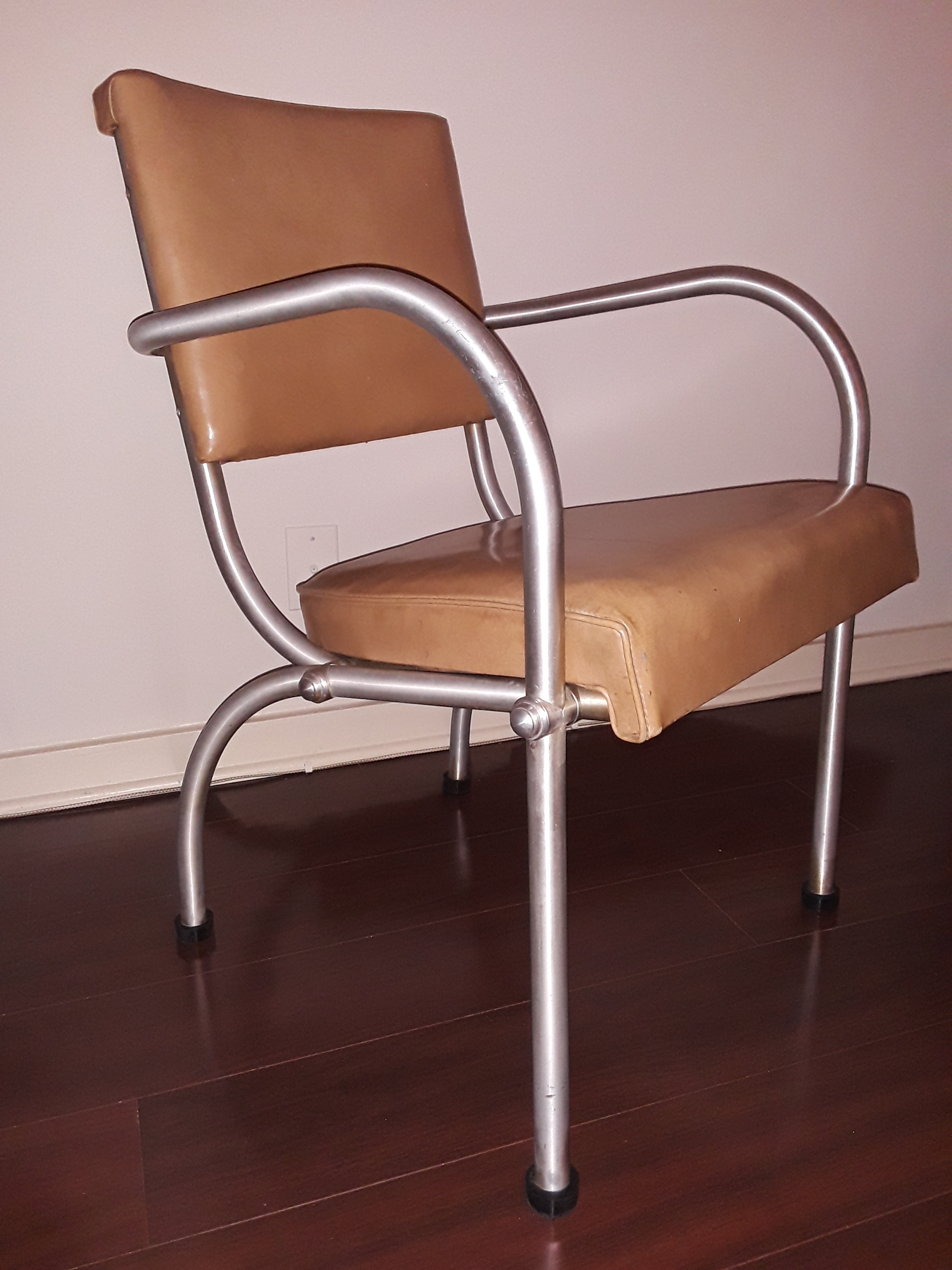
Warren McArthur Corp. Chair, 1938

== Furniture construction ==
McArthur's furniture was made in limited production because of the painstaking construction and expensive materials used. McArthur patented a technique to provide rigidity and strength to his aluminum tubular furniture, aluminum being a weak metal. McArthur had supporting steel rods placed inside the hollow aluminum tubes of his furniture. The tubes and inner rods were attached together with interchangeable joints and washers that were visible and sometimes capped with a smooth round button. The furniture was then polished and given a finish that resembled matte silver. Many of his furniture designs had black rubber feet that resembled hockey pucks.

== Wartime production and later career ==
With the start of World War II, aluminum was restricted to war needs. The Warren McArthur Corp., which began making airplane seats along with its furniture in the late 1930s, was asked by the United States government to make aircraft seats for military airplanes. McArthur produced the majority of aircraft seating for military planes during the war. It is estimated that the Warren McArthur Corp. produced between 75 and 85 percent of the seats used in US military aircraft during the war. McArthur made an important technological innovation by making the airplane seats out of magnesium alloy tubing that was lightweight and strong and that also saved other precious war-needed materials.

After the war, McArthur produced passenger airplane seats until his company closed in 1948. In 1948, McArthur founded Mayfair Industries in Yonkers, New York and made institutional furniture, including a popular folding chair design, until he retired in 1961.

McArthur died in 1961 in New York City.

== Legacy ==
Largely forgotten by the 1970s, McArthur's furniture was rediscovered in the 1990s. During that decade, Dolce & Gabbana used McArthur furniture in its ad campaign.

Warren McArthur furniture is now highly sought by collectors and included in numerous museum collections, including the Brooklyn Museum, the Los Angeles County Museum of Art, the Philadelphia Museum of Art, the Art Institute of Chicago, the Virginia Museum of Fine Arts, and Cooper Hewitt, Smithsonian Design Museum.
