= Arizona Biltmore Hotel =

Hotel in Phoenix, Arizona

Coordinates: 33.5235°N 112.0230°W

Arizona Biltmore
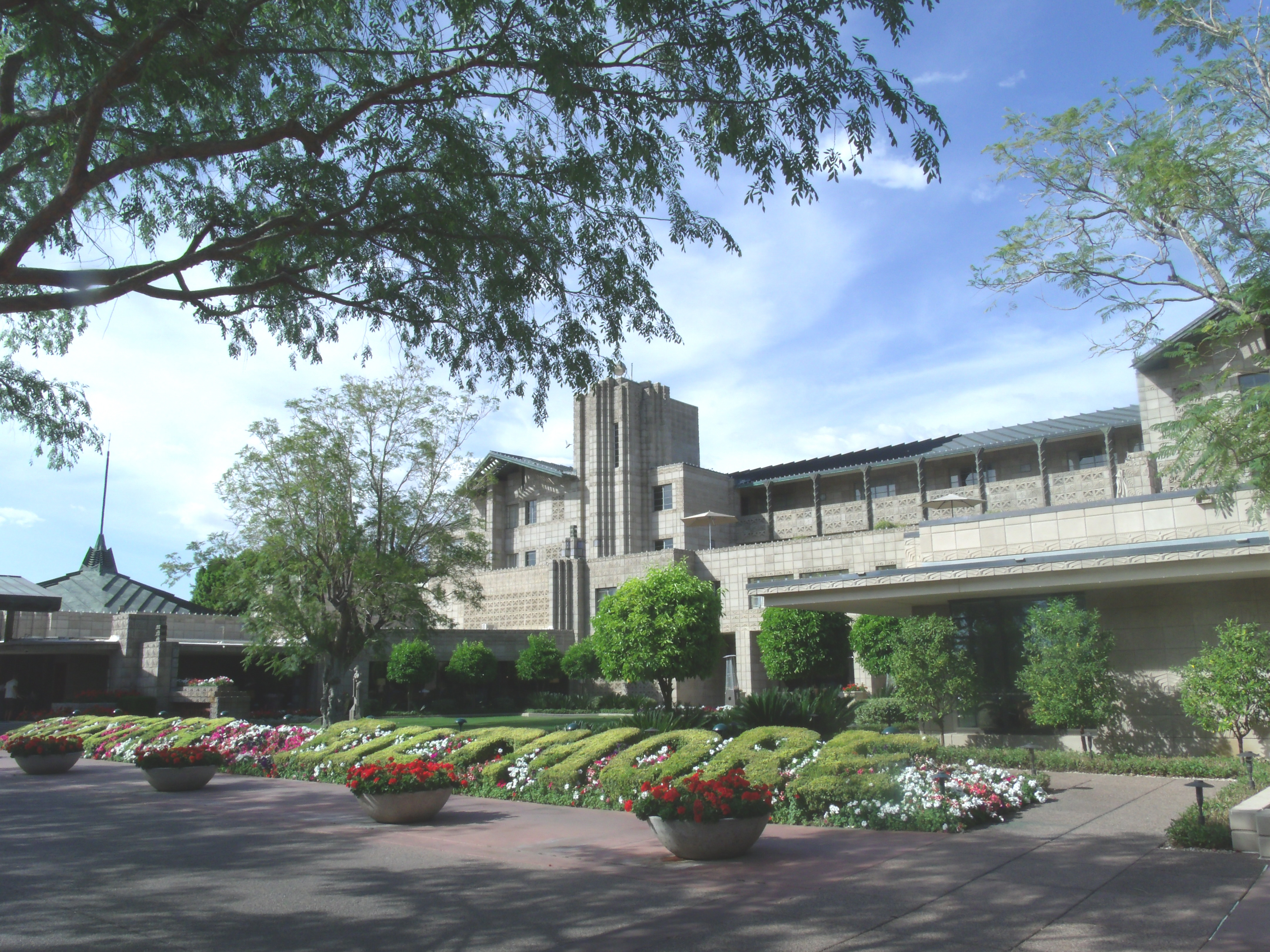
- Interactive map of the Arizona Biltmore area
- Hotel chain: LXR Hotels & Resorts

General information
- Location: 2400 E Missouri Ave., Phoenix, Arizona, US, 85016
- Opening: February 23, 1929
- Owner: Henderson Park
- Operator: Pyramid Hospitality Group

Design and construction
- Architect: Albert Chase McArthur
- Main contractor: S. M. Benet & Company

Website
- www.arizonabiltmore.com

The Arizona Biltmore is a historic resort located in Phoenix, Arizona, near 24th Street and Camelback Road. Designed by Albert Chase McArthur, it opened on February 23, 1929, as part of the Biltmore Hotel chain. Actors Clark Gable and Carole Lombard often stayed there and the Tequila sunrise cocktail was invented there. It is part of LXR Hotels & Resorts.

== History ==
=== Early years ===
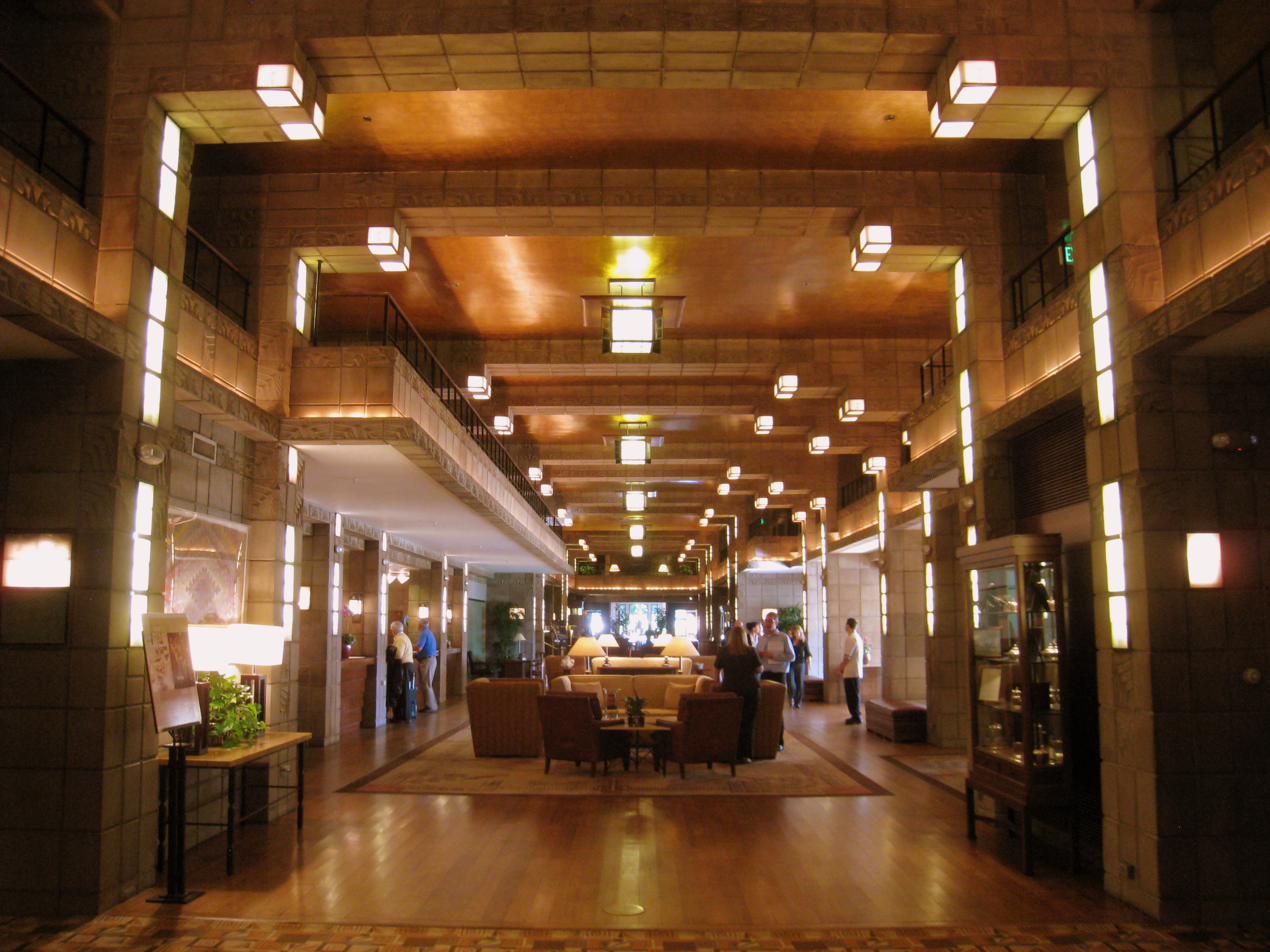
The lobby

Warren McArthur Jr. and brother Charles McArthur, along with John McEntee Bowman, the entrepreneur behind the Biltmore Hotel chain, constructed the Arizona Biltmore.

The Arizona Biltmore's architect of record is Albert Chase McArthur (brother of the hotel owners), yet the design is often mistakenly attributed to Frank Lloyd Wright. This is due to Wright's on-site consulting for four months in 1928 relating to the "Textile Block" construction used in the hotel. Albert McArthur had been a draftsman for Wright and specifically asked him to assist with implementing the textile block system, which became a signature element of the hotel's appearance. The hotel has similarities to several Wright buildings, especially in the main lobby, owing to a strong imprint of the unit block design that Wright had utilized on four residential buildings in the Los Angeles area six years earlier. McArthur is indisputably the architect, as original linen drawings of the hotel in the Arizona State University Library archives attest, as does a 1929 feature article in Architectural Record magazine. The two architects are a study in contrast, with the famous and outspoken Wright being self-taught and never licensed as an architect in Arizona. The more soft-spoken McArthur was Harvard-trained in architecture, mathematics, engineering, and music. McArthur obtained architect's license number 338 in Arizona in 1925, the year he arrived in Phoenix to begin his practice.

Adding to the confusion, Frank Lloyd Wright influences have been added to the property over the years. This includes a stained glass window design entitled "Saguaro Forms and Cactus Flowers" that Wright designed as a magazine cover for Liberty Magazine in 1926. It was fabricated by Taliesin students and installed during the 1973 hotel renovations and restoration. Reproductions of the geometric "sprite" statues originally designed by Wright and sculpted by Alfonso Iannelli for the 1915 Midway Gardens project in Chicago are placed around the property. Also, the original hotel solarium was converted to a restaurant in 1973 and, since the mid-1990s, has been named "Wright's". Three on-site restaurants bear Wright's name: Wright's at the Biltmore, The Wright Bar, and Frank & Albert's.

Three construction crews worked 24 hours a day to complete the hotel. S. M. Benet & Company of Beverly Hills, California, was the contractor, with L. D. Richardson serving as project superintendent.

The hotel opened on February 23, 1929.

=== William Wrigley Jr. becomes full owner ===
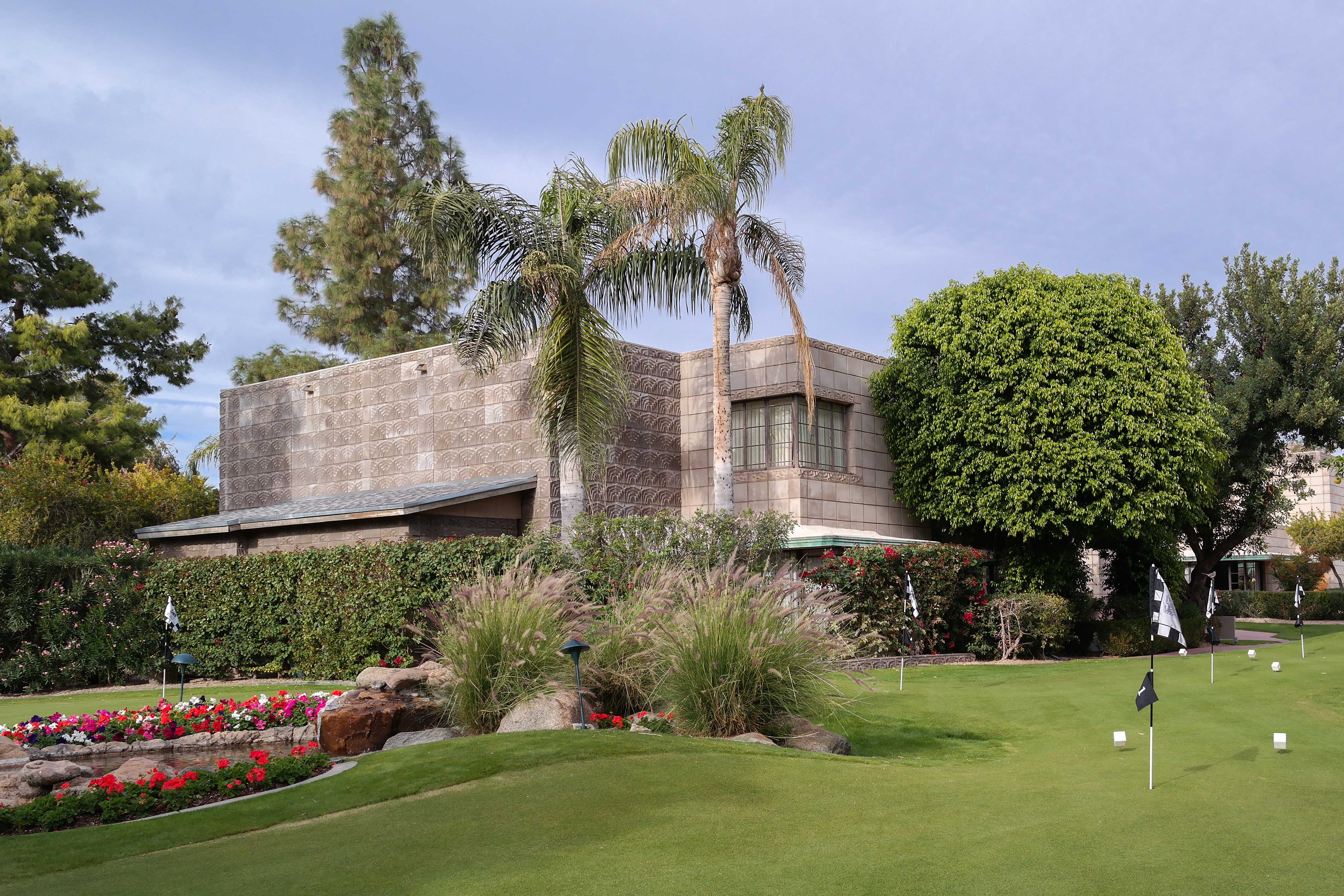
The Reagan honeymoon cottage, Cottage I

In 1930, the McArthurs (the owners) lost control of the property to one of their primary investors, William Wrigley Jr., who became full owner. The nearby Wrigley Mansion was built in 1931 and now operates as a private club.

In March 1952, Ronald and Nancy Reagan spent their honeymoon at the resort. Their favorite cottage in the resort was Cottage I.

=== Fire ===
In 1970, the Wrigley family sold the hotel to the Talley family. 1973 almost spelled doom for the hotel: a large fire erupted on June 21, destroying interiors of large parts of the 3rd and 4th floors and tremendous water damage on the 2nd and ground floors. Investigators discovered that an arc from a welder installing a sprinkler system had started the blaze. Thirty-five (35) firetrucks and a hundred and fifty (150) fire fighters responded to the 6-alarm fire which resulted in $2.5 million of damage.

It was announced immediately by the new owners that this famed hotel would be rebuilt in 90 days and opened on schedule for its regular winter season the last week of September 1973. The prompt re-building included new custom designed carpets throughout the hotel, new furniture for guest rooms and public areas, new restaurant kitchen equipment, and renovated public interiors throughout the hotel. "Saguaros", a design by Wright for the cover of Liberty Magazine, was fabricated by Taliesin students during the remodeling of the hotel and was installed in the lobby. Three separate crews were employed around the clock. In the wee hours before opening day, the final carpets were laid and the deadline had been met by a partnership of the owner, Talley Industries, the general contractor, J.R. Porter Construction Co., and the architect, Taliesin Associated Architects.

=== Expansions ===
After the 1973 fire the hotel began planning for an expansion. The 89-room Paradise Wing completed in 1975 was the first major expansion of the hotel since it had opened. The new wing was designed by John Rattenbury of Taliesin Associated Architects. M. M. Sundt Construction Company was general contractor for the new Paradise Wing and used precast concrete planes which are 18 square feet. The forms for the concrete panels were crafted using the "Biltmore blocks" forms to achieve a uniform look with the original building.

Western International Hotels assumed management of the hotel on September 1, 1977. The company was renamed Westin Hotels in 1980 and managed the property until July 1, 1994.

In 1979 the Taliesin-designed 120-room Valley Wing and a 39,000 square foot conference center opened. In 1982 the 109-room Terrace Court Wing was added, a Taliesin design similar to the existing architecture. General contractor for the Terrace Court was D. L. Construction.

=== Change of ownership ===
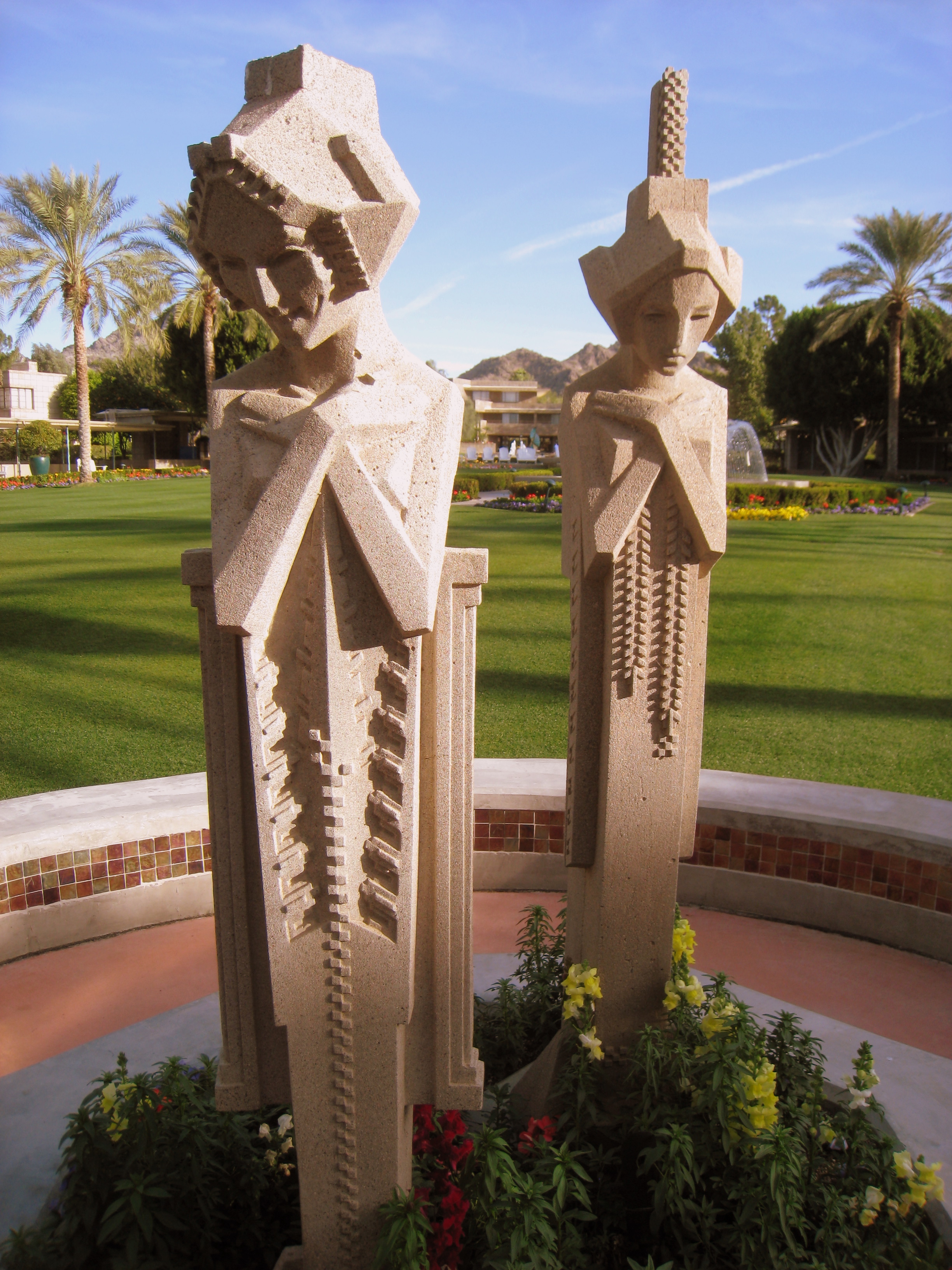
Replicas of the Midway Gardens Sprites at the Arizona Biltmore

In 1979, the hotel was taken over by the Rostland Corporation. In 1983, it became a Leper DBL Biltmore Association property, and in 1992 it was re-sold, to the Grossman Properties. A spa was opened in 1998.

In July 1999, Florida Panther Holdings, Inc. acquired the property from Grossman Company Properties for $228.5M ($126M cash, $100M Florida Panther stock, and $62.5 debt assumption). Also, in 1999 Florida Panther Holdings, Inc. changed its name to Boca Resorts, Inc. At the time, Florida Panthers Holdings, Inc. also owned the Boca Raton Resort & Club, the Registry Resort, the Edgewater Beach Hotel, the Hyatt Regency Pier 66 Resort and Marina, the Radisson Bahia Mar Resort and Yachting Center and Grande Oaks Golf Club. The company also owned the Florida Panthers Hockey Club and had interests in the operations of the National Car Rental Center located in Sunrise, Florida and the Miami Arena.

In December 2000, Boca Resorts, Inc. sold the hotel for $335 million to KSL Recreation, Inc. KSL retained the hotel until April 2004, when it was sold to the Orlando, Florida-based REIT, CNL Hotels & Resorts as part of the corporate acquisition of six of KSL's seven resort assets. CNL was sold to Morgan Stanley in 2007. In 2011, the hotel filed for Chapter 11 bankruptcy, with lenders including Paulson & Co., Winthrop Realty Trust and Capital Trust foreclosed on 8 of the former CNL hotels. in 2013, the owners reached a deal to sell the Biltmore and three other properties to the Government of Singapore Investment Corporation. Blackstone acquired the Arizona Biltmore in 2018. Hilton operated it as a member of their luxury Waldorf-Astoria Collection until May 2024, when it was transferred to their LXR Hotels & Resorts line. Blackstone sold the Arizona Biltmore to Henderson Park and Pyramid Global Hospitality in 2024.

=== Other notable events ===
In 2004, while doing a campaign stop in Arizona, United States president George W. Bush slept there, under strict security measures. Over 200 policemen, Secret Service agents and bomb-sniffing dogs were at hand.

On November 4, 2008, the McCain/Palin campaign hosted its final party at the hotel. Sen. John McCain, the Republican candidate for president, conceded defeat when he spoke to reporters and disappointed supporters on the hotel's lawn. Some supporters watched McCain's speech via closed circuit TV from the ballroom. Former Louisiana Gov. Buddy Roemer acted as master of ceremonies for the evening's entertainment earlier in the evening, in the ballroom.

In 2009, the Arizona Biltmore marked its 80th anniversary with two additions that reinforced the history and architectural legacy of the resort. Ocatilla at Arizona Biltmore – a 120-room addition offering the resort's most enhanced guest services, many complimentary amenities, club accommodations and Wright-inspired décor – was named for a compound Wright built in Phoenix's South Mountains to serve as his secluded, inspirational workplace. A new restaurant, Frank & Albert's, was inspired by and named for Wright and McArthur. A menu was created – of comfort foods and American classics with an Arizona twist – reflecting the dual influences of the two architects.

The Arizona Biltmore was designated as a Phoenix Point of Pride and was listed in the Phoenix Historic Property Register in July 2009.

== Hotel features ==
=== Biltmore blocks ===
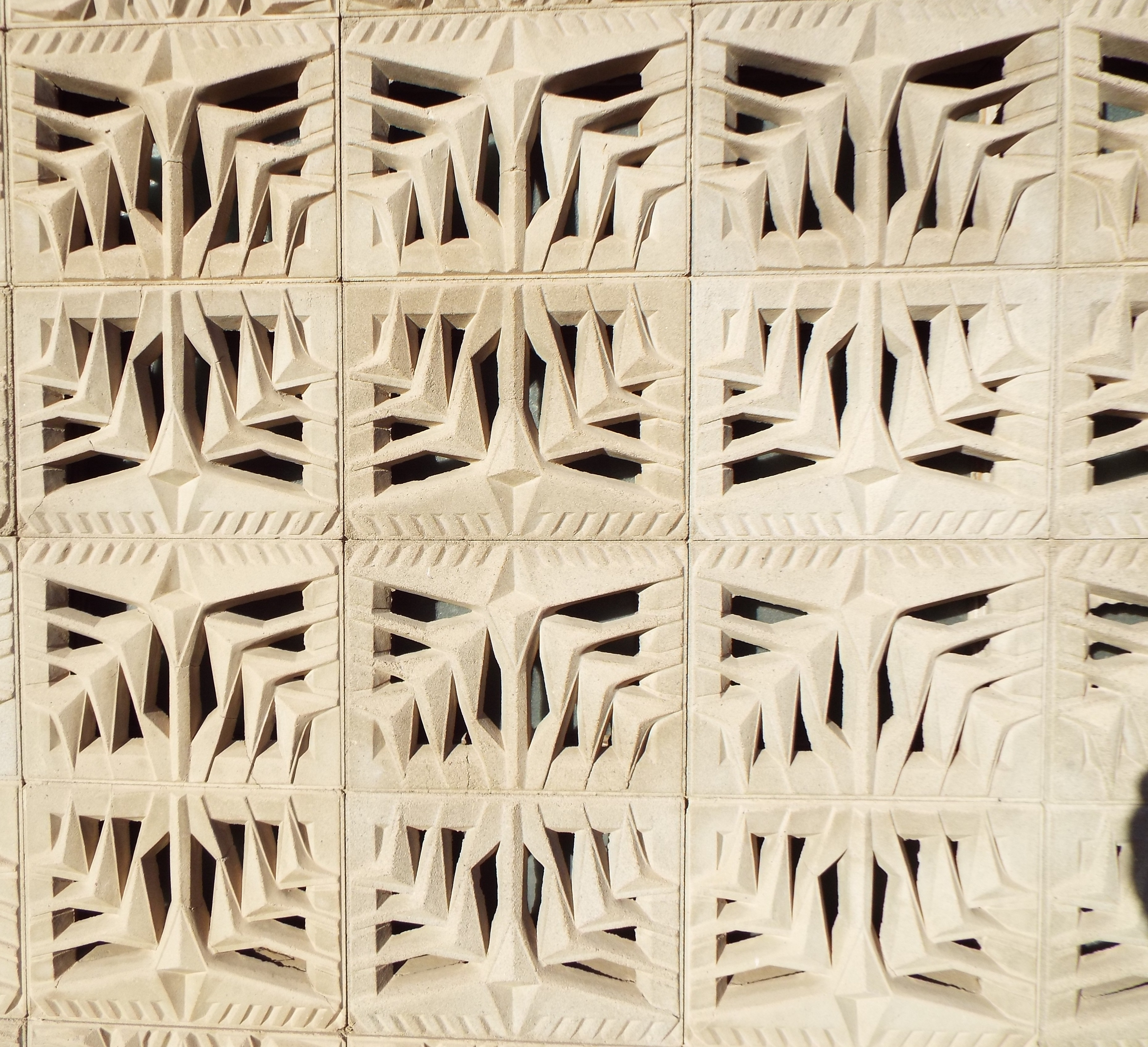
Stylized "Biltmore Blocks" by architect, Albert Chase McArthur

Authorship of the hotel's design is not a new dispute. Wright wanted square blocks as opposed to McArthur's mathematically proportioned rectangle block that was used. The pre-cast blocks which McArthur used became known as the "Biltmore Blocks". The blocks had a diverse geometric design and were made on site from desert sand.

Wright had condemned McArthur's use of the block system and publicly claimed credit for the building's design. Nonetheless, Wright issued a carefully worded letter in 1930 that was published in The Architectural Record (quoted in Brendan Gill's Many Masks):

All I have done in connection with the building of the Arizona Biltmore, near Phoenix, I have done for Albert McArthur himself at his sole request, and for none other. Albert McArthur is the architect of that building – all attempts to take the credit for that performance from him are gratuitous and beside the mark. But for him, Phoenix would have had nothing like the Biltmore, and it is my hope that he may be enabled to give Phoenix many more beautiful buildings as I believe him entirely capable of doing.

=== History Room ===
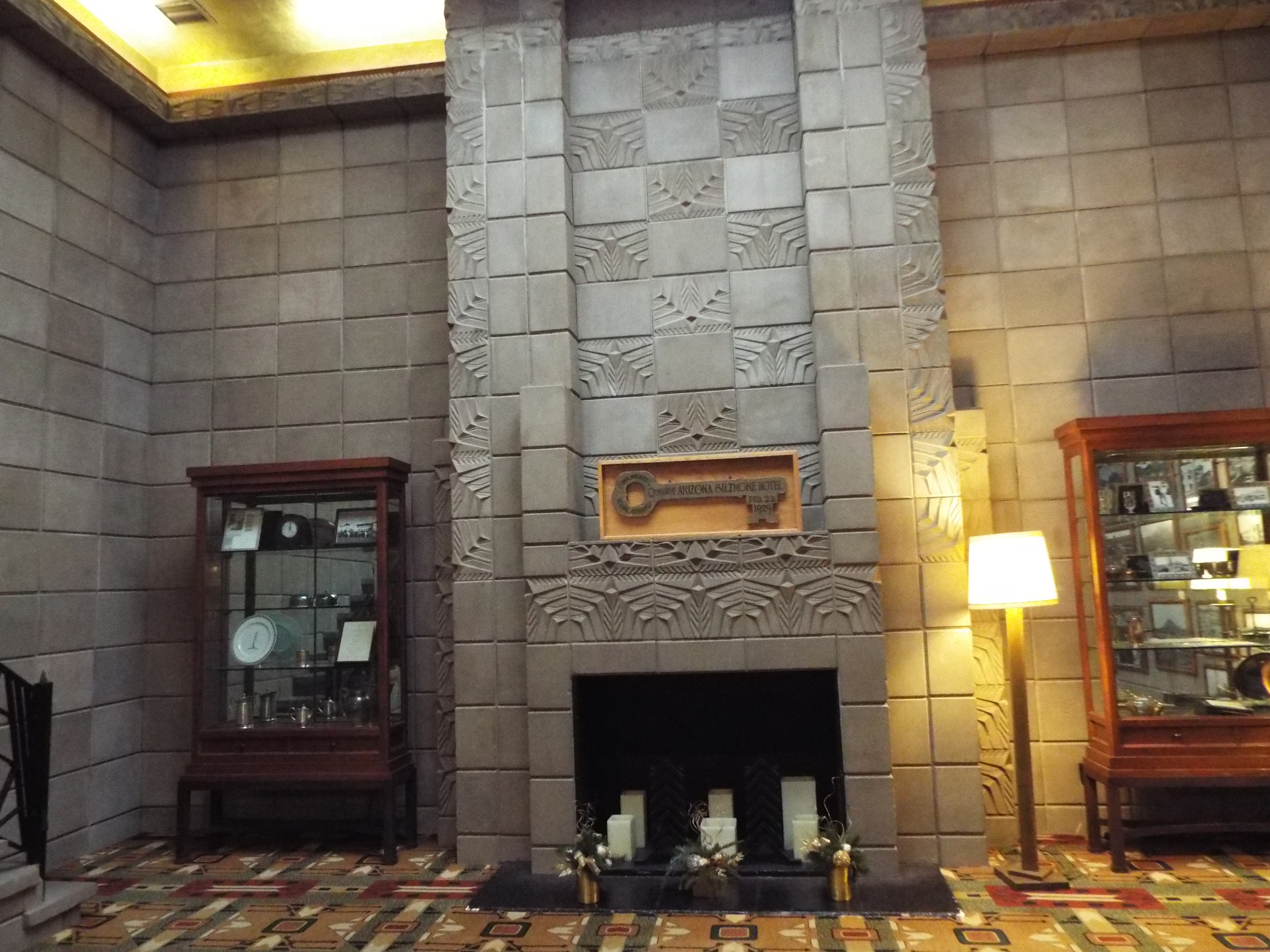
Inside the History Room

The Biltmore History Room is located on the third floor. In the room there are displays of not only historical artifacts related to the hotel's history, but also the early furnishes which were once used. Among the historical artifacts on display is a wooden key which Scenic Airways dropped on the roof of the ballroom on February 23, 1929, the opening day of the hotel. The key is on display above the room's fireplace.

=== Mystery Room ===
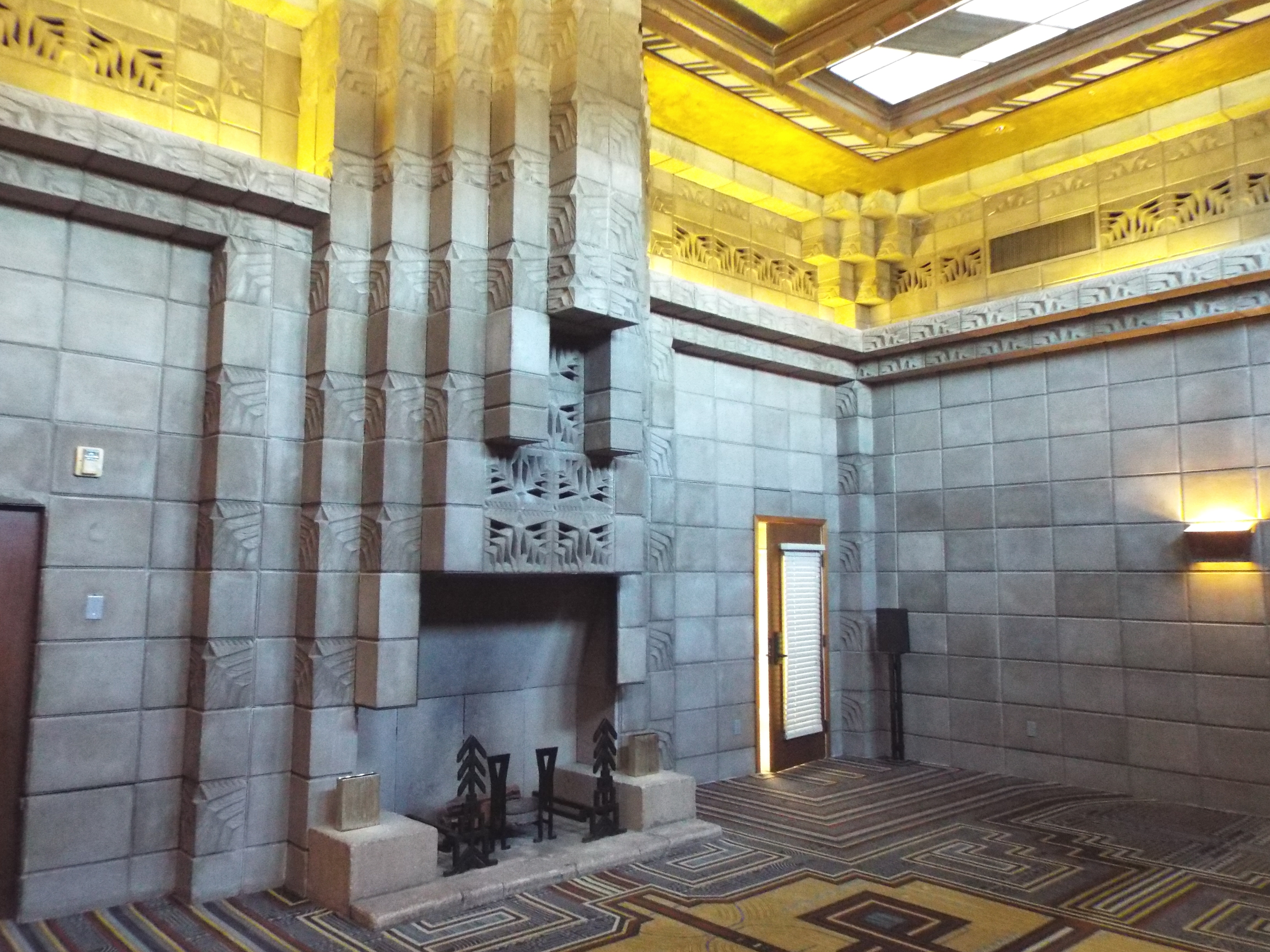
Inside the Mystery Room

On the second floor of the hotel there was a room known as the Mystery Room. It was called the "Men's Smoking Room" where supposedly the men who were guests went to smoke cigars. This was during the days of Prohibition (1920 to 1933) and the name of the room was a disguise because its true function in the night was that of a speakeasy. Only the guests that knew the secret password were allowed in. In the room there was a bar behind a revolving bookcase where the illegal alcoholic drinks were served. The hotel placed a beacon light (spotlight) atop the hotel whose official purpose was to alert the speakeasy guests in the event that the police arrived to raid the place. A hotel employee would be stationed on the roof and if he saw any police cars he would flash the spotlight on the skylight of the Mystery Room. When the guests in the room saw the light, they would return to their rooms through secret passageways. What is now an entry door to the room used to be an exit door behind a wall sealed off from the rest of the hallway so that police wouldn't see guests leaving. Actors Clark Gable and Carole Lombard would often stay in room 1201 (now known as the Clark Gable room) which was right next door to the Mystery Room. Their room had a secret passageway to the Mystery Room. The room is now used for meetings and conferences.

=== Gold Room ===
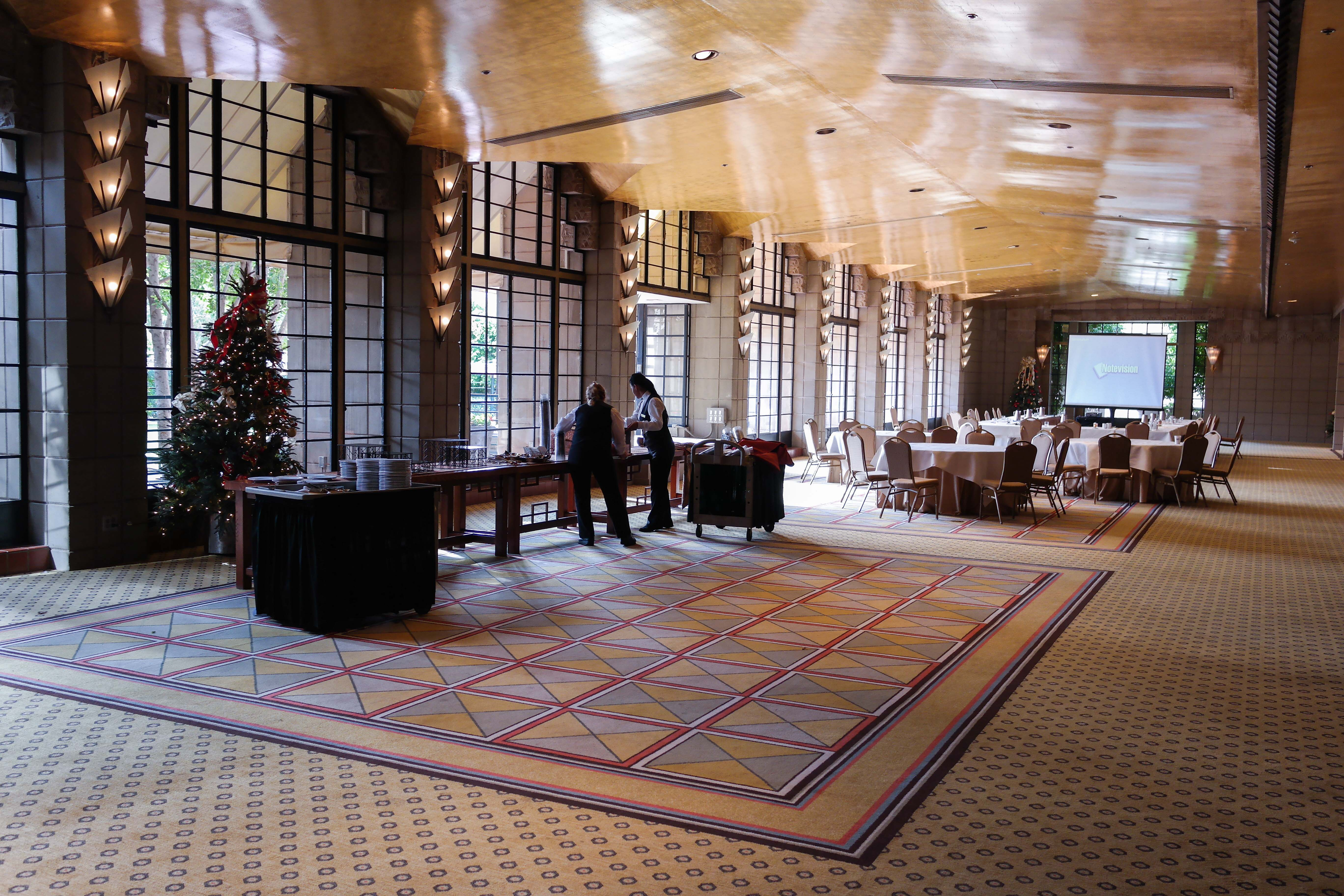
The Gold Room

Clark Gable and friends used to dine in the Gold Room. The 7,000 square foot ballroom could accommodate 480 guests. The Gold Room, with the gold leaf ceiling, was the original dining room of the Biltmore. It featured dancing and a live orchestra every night. The gold leaf ceiling and windows are from the original structure. There are two murals on the walls: "Legend of the Sun" and "Warrior Twins" by Maynard Dixon (a 20th-century American artist whose body of work focused on the American West) which were done on Belgian Linen.

=== Aztec Room ===
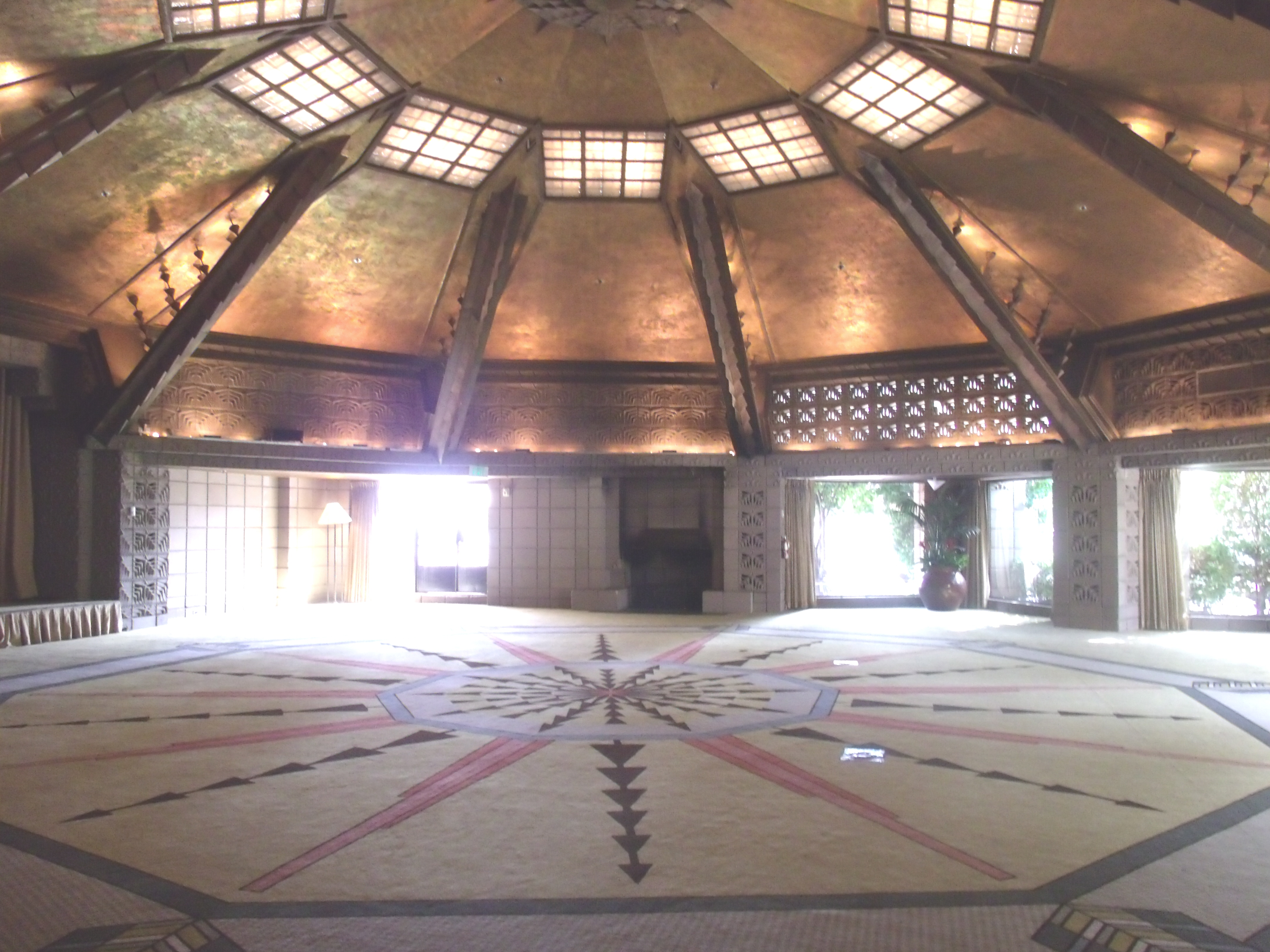
Inside the Aztec Room

The Aztec Room was the original ballroom of the Biltmore. The 2,800 square feet room has a gold leaf ceiling and copper beams. Frank Lloyd Wright was instrumental in the room's design which had few or no adjustments.

=== Catalina Pool ===
In 1940, the Catalina Pool aka Marilyn Monroe's Pool and the Cowboy Bunkhouse areas opened. These became favorite areas of Hollywood celebrities. The Catalina Pool was Marilyn Monroe's favorite and she was often seen around the pool area sunbathing. Catalina pool supposedly is where Irving Berlin penned the iconic song "White Christmas". Martha Raye was photographed playing chess on a large chessboard around the Cowboy house.

== Original Tequila Sunrise ==
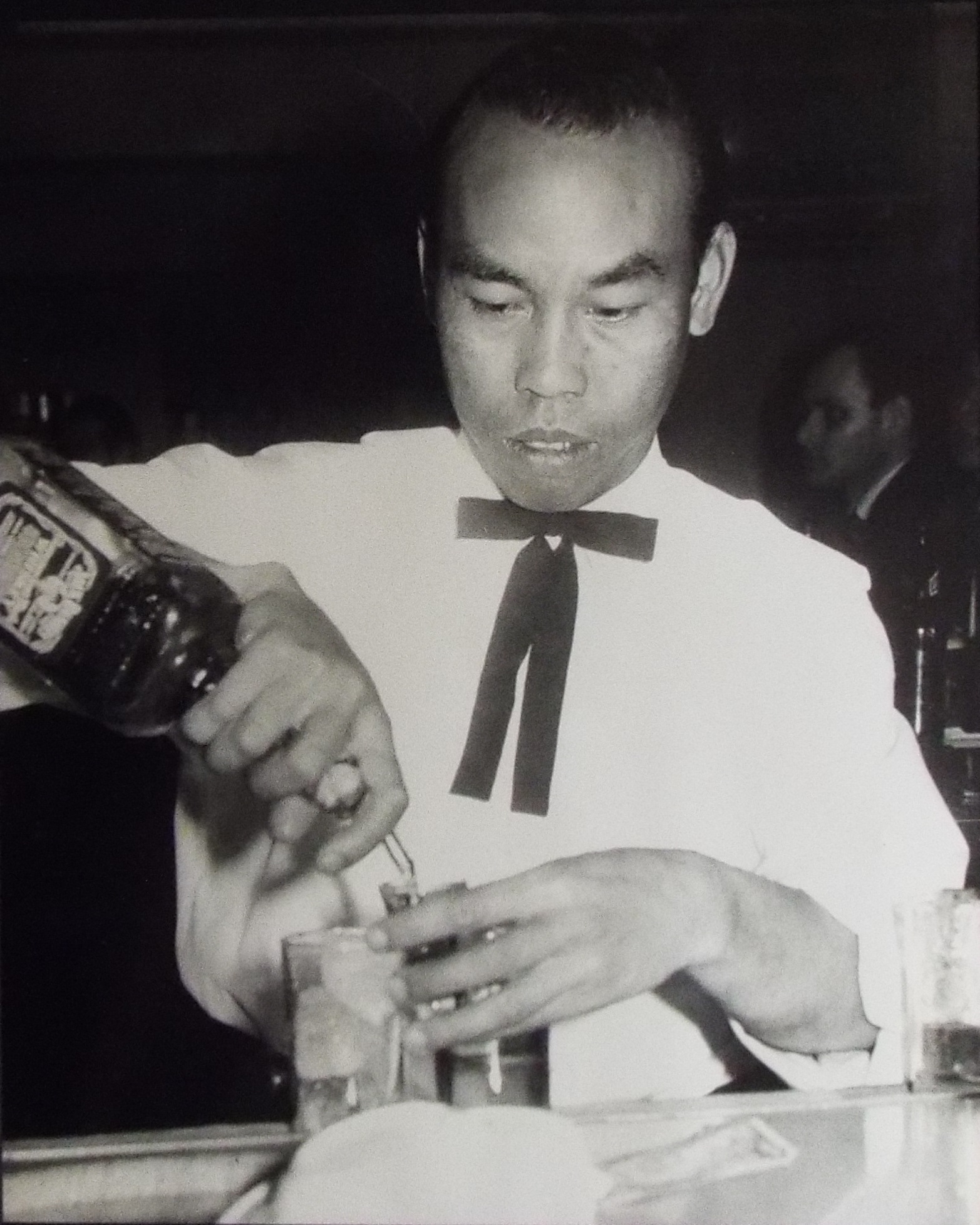
Bartender Gene Sulit

The Tequila sunrise is an alcoholic cocktail whose ingredients include tequila, Crème de Cassis, fresh squeezed lime juice and Club Soda. It was invented in the late 1930s by bartender Gene Sulit. Sulit was attending customers in the hotel's "Wright" bar when one particular customer asked Sulit if he could come up with a new drink to be enjoyed at poolside. Sulit mixed the ingredients mentioned above and the drink became known as the Biltmore Tequila Sunrise.

== Gallery ==
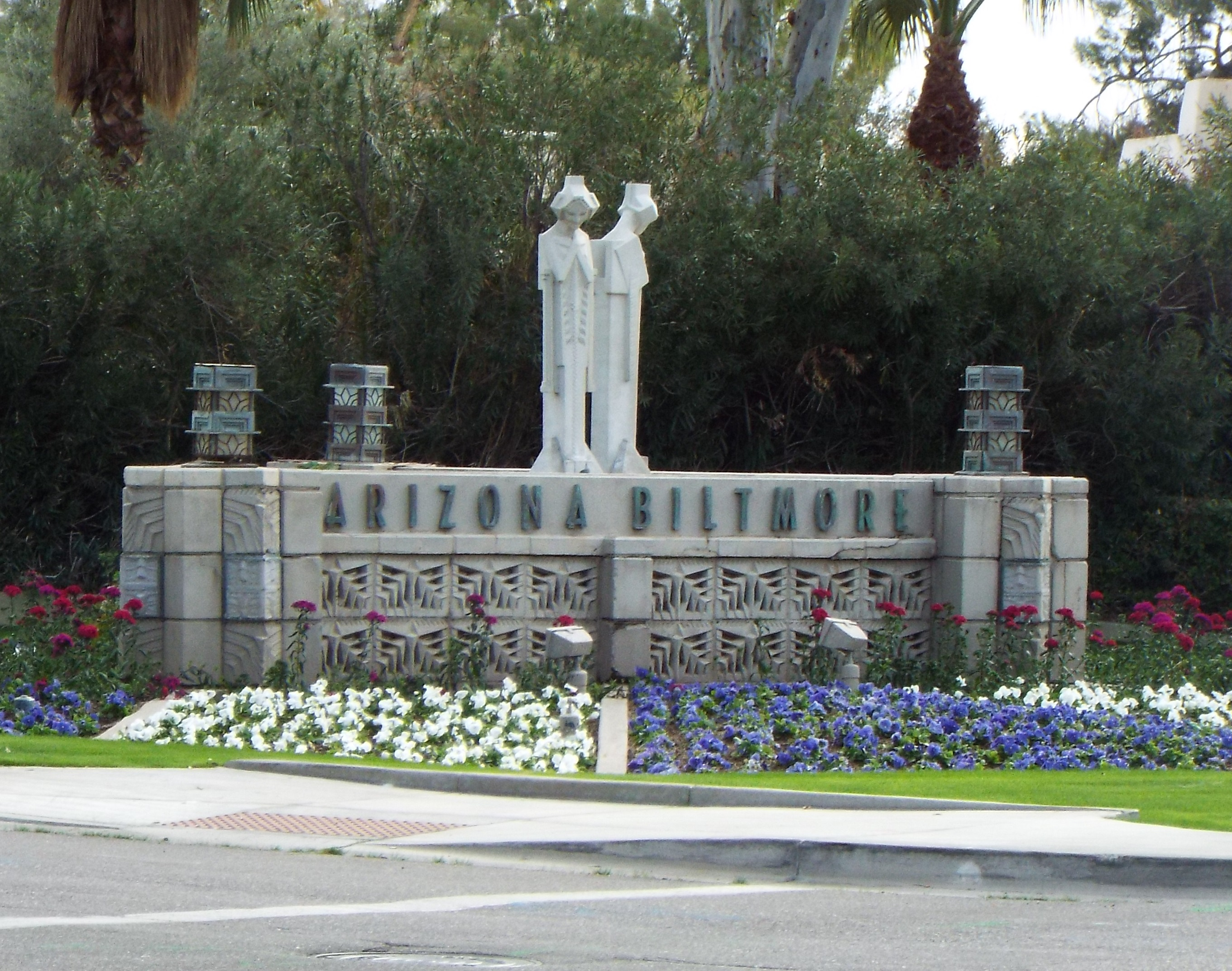
Hotel street entrance

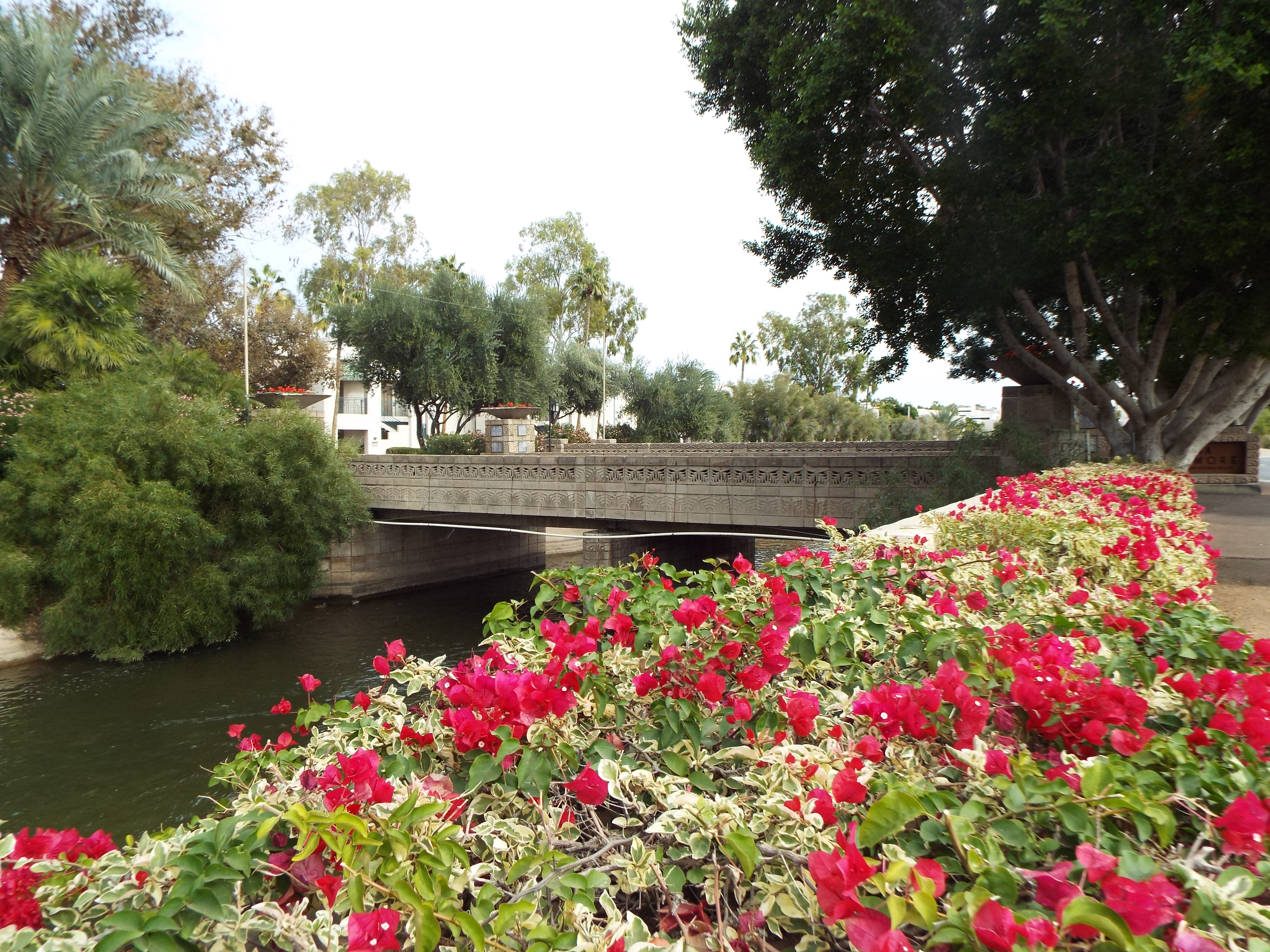
Hotel bridge

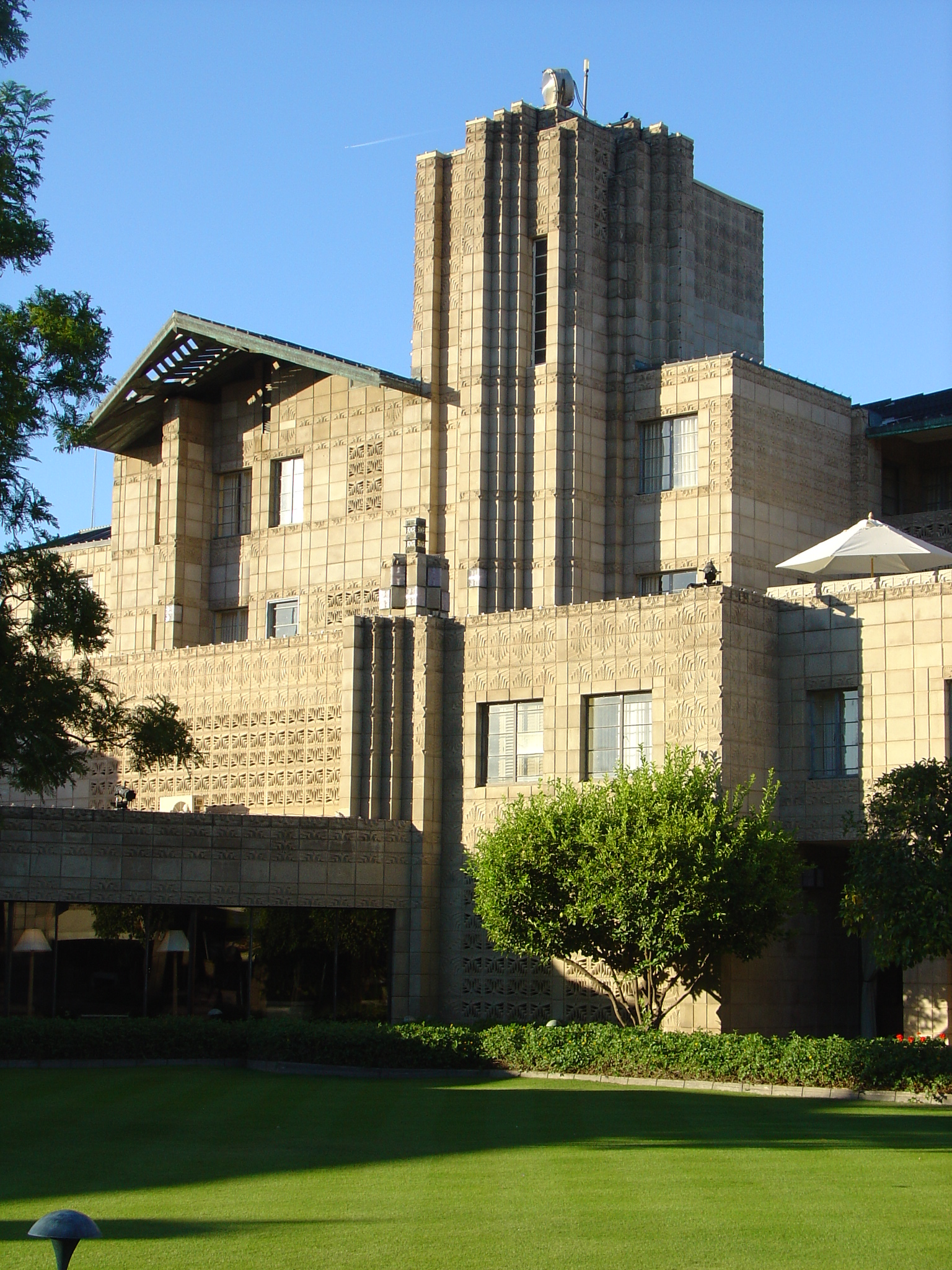
The Hotel

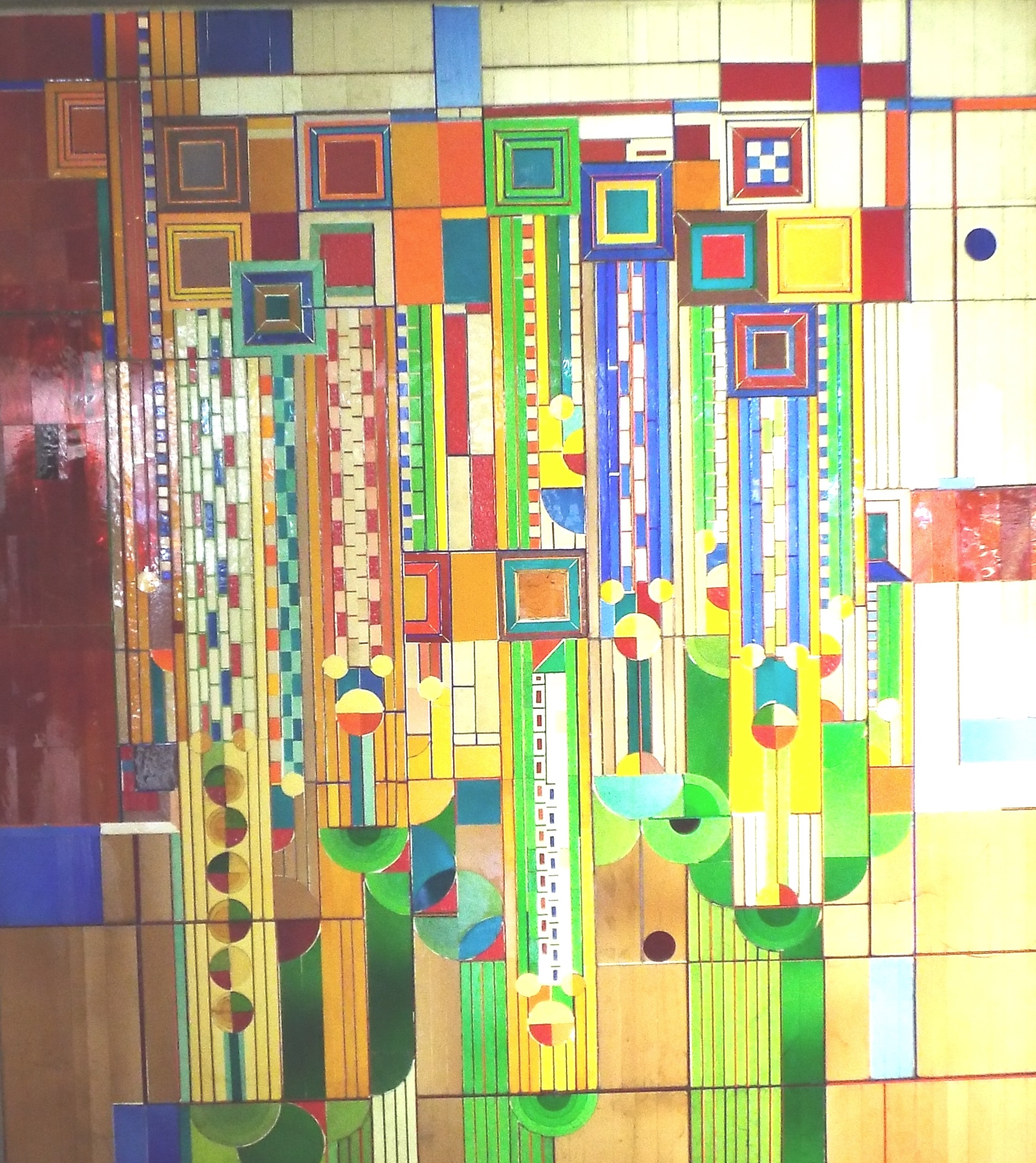
Saguaro Stained Glass by Frank Lloyd Wright in the lobby

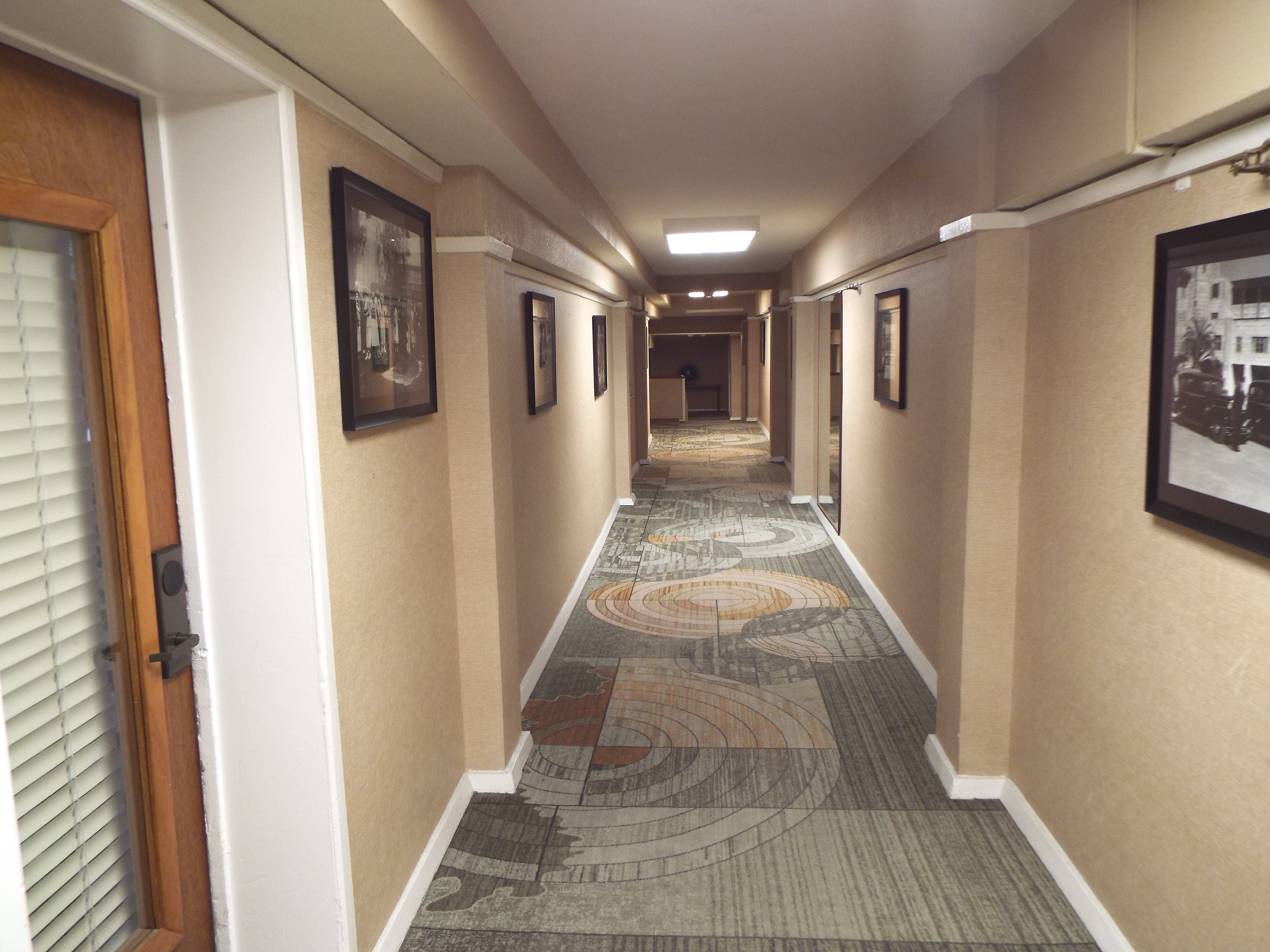
Mystery Room secret passageway

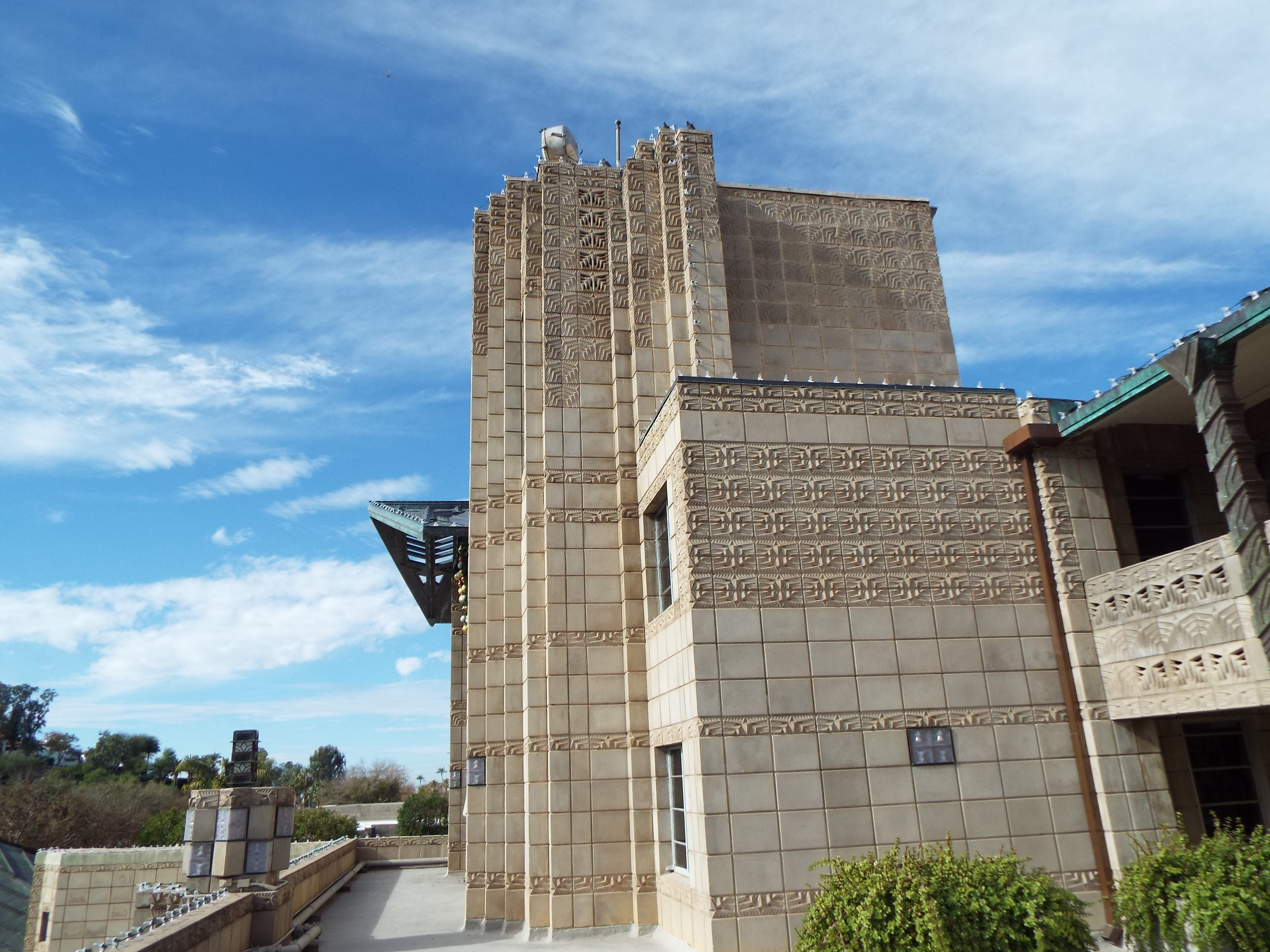
Spotlight on top of the hotel tower

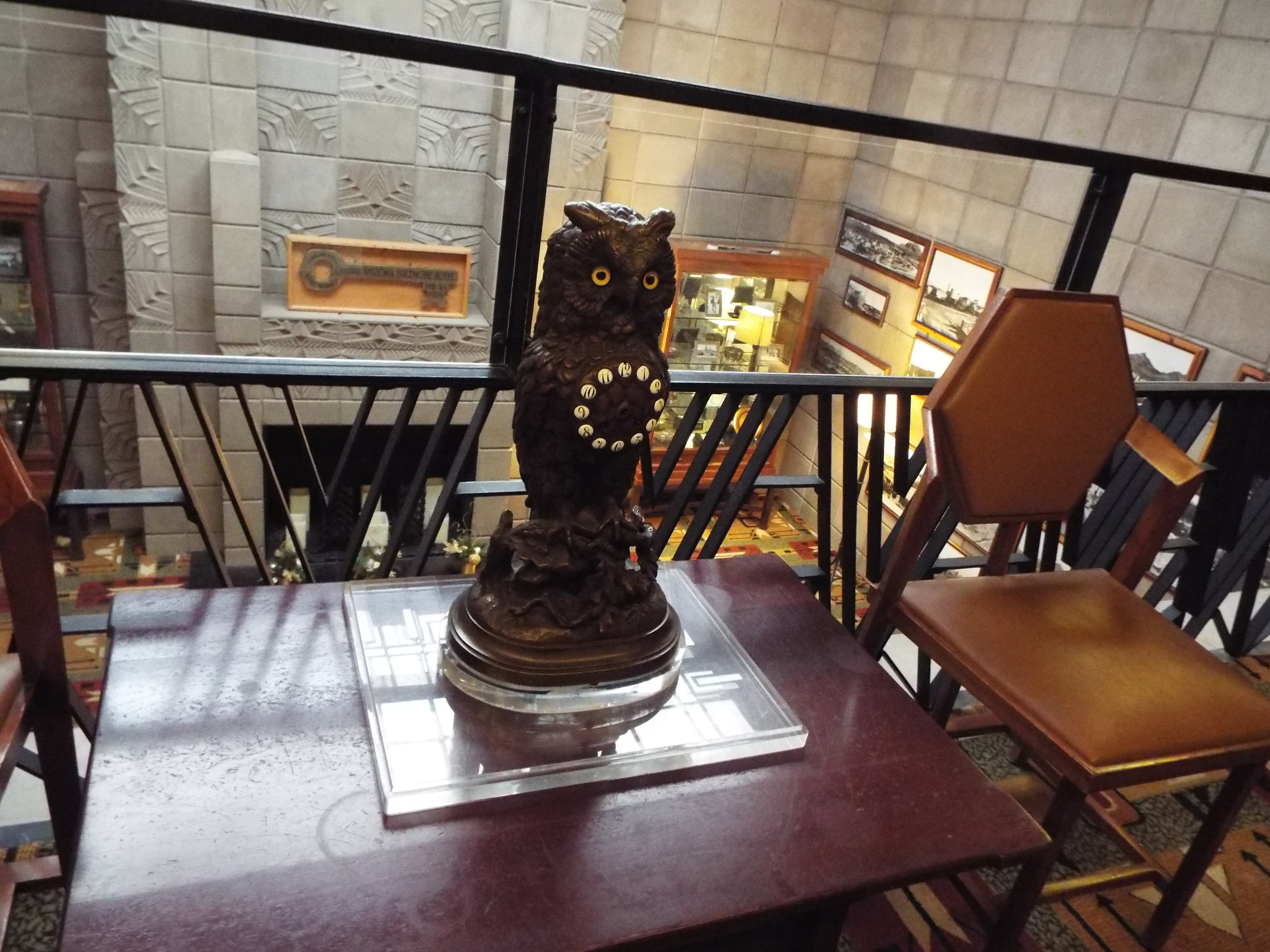
Furnishings inside the History Room

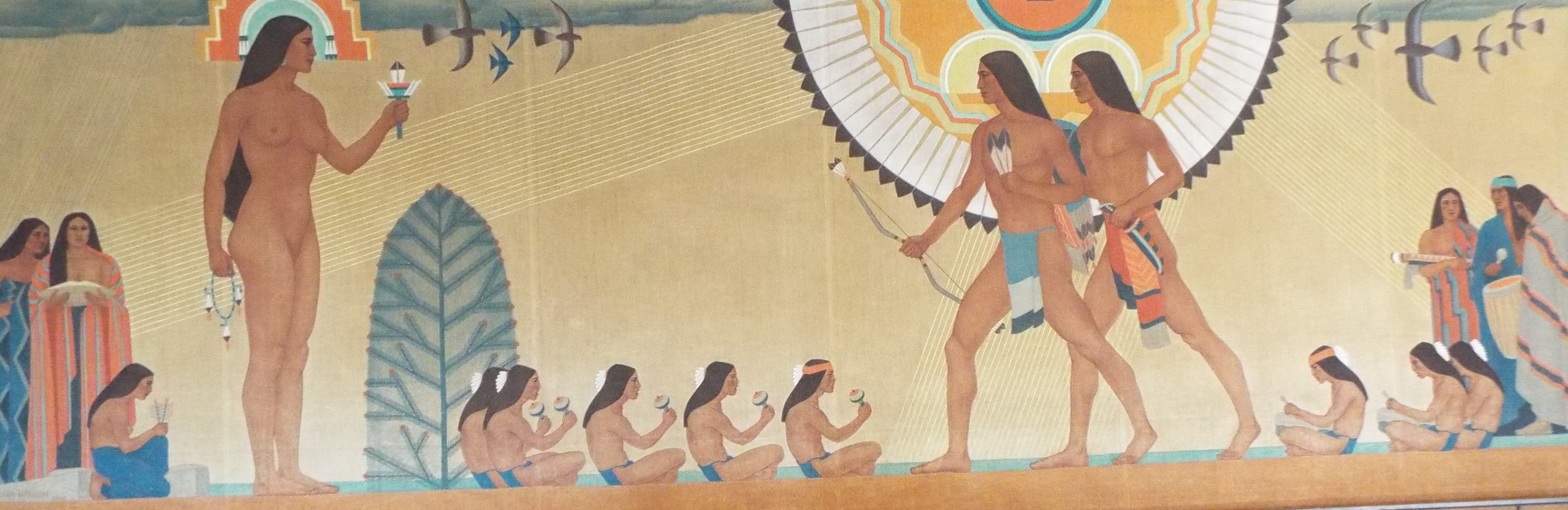
The "Warrior Twins" painting

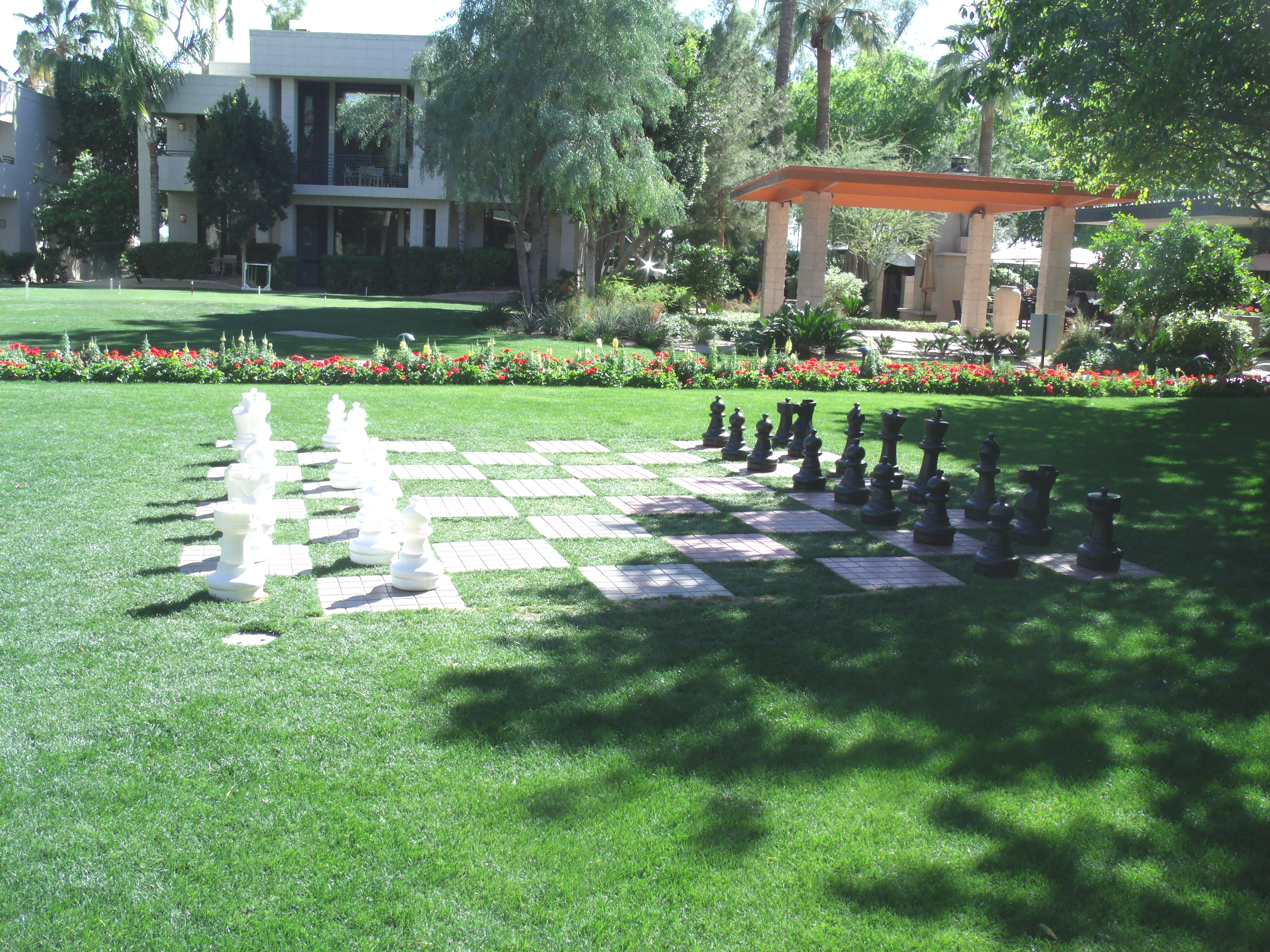
Large chess board on the grounds of the hotel. According to Hotel historians, American actress Martha Raye played there.

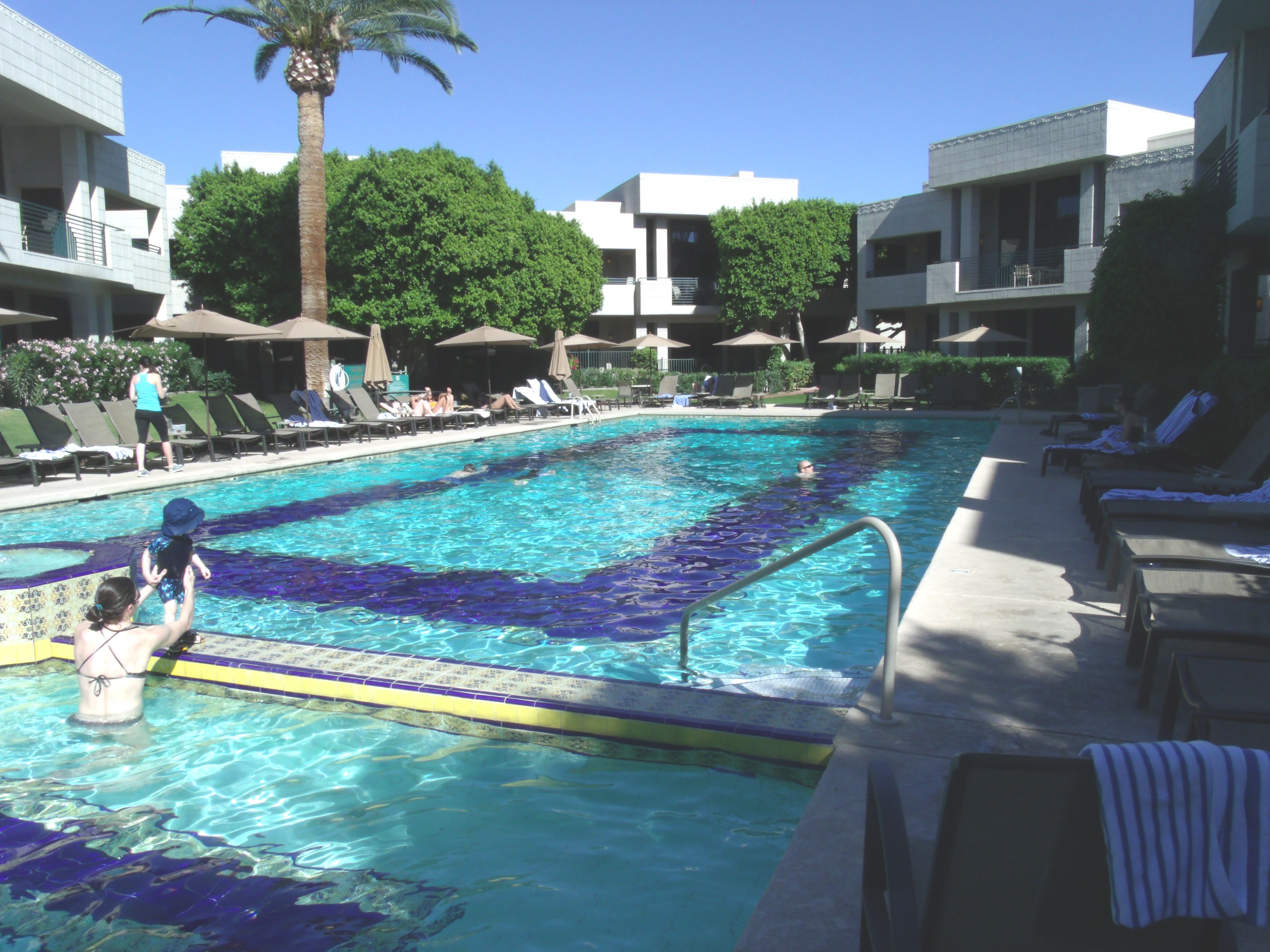
The Catalina Pool was built in the 1930s. The pool was often used by actress Marilyn Monroe and allegedly the site where American composer Irving Berlin wrote "White Christmas".

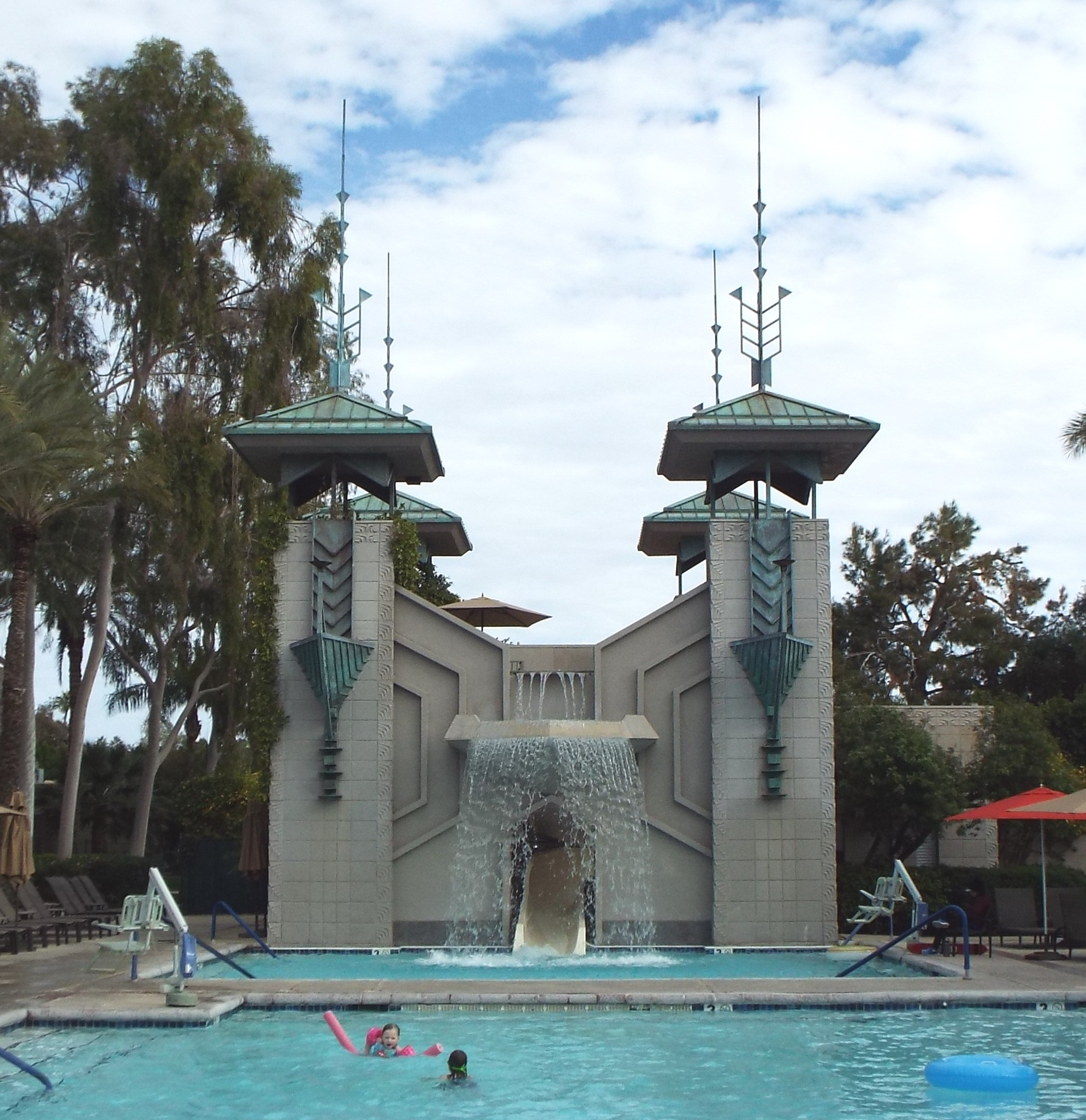
Paradise Pool three story water slide

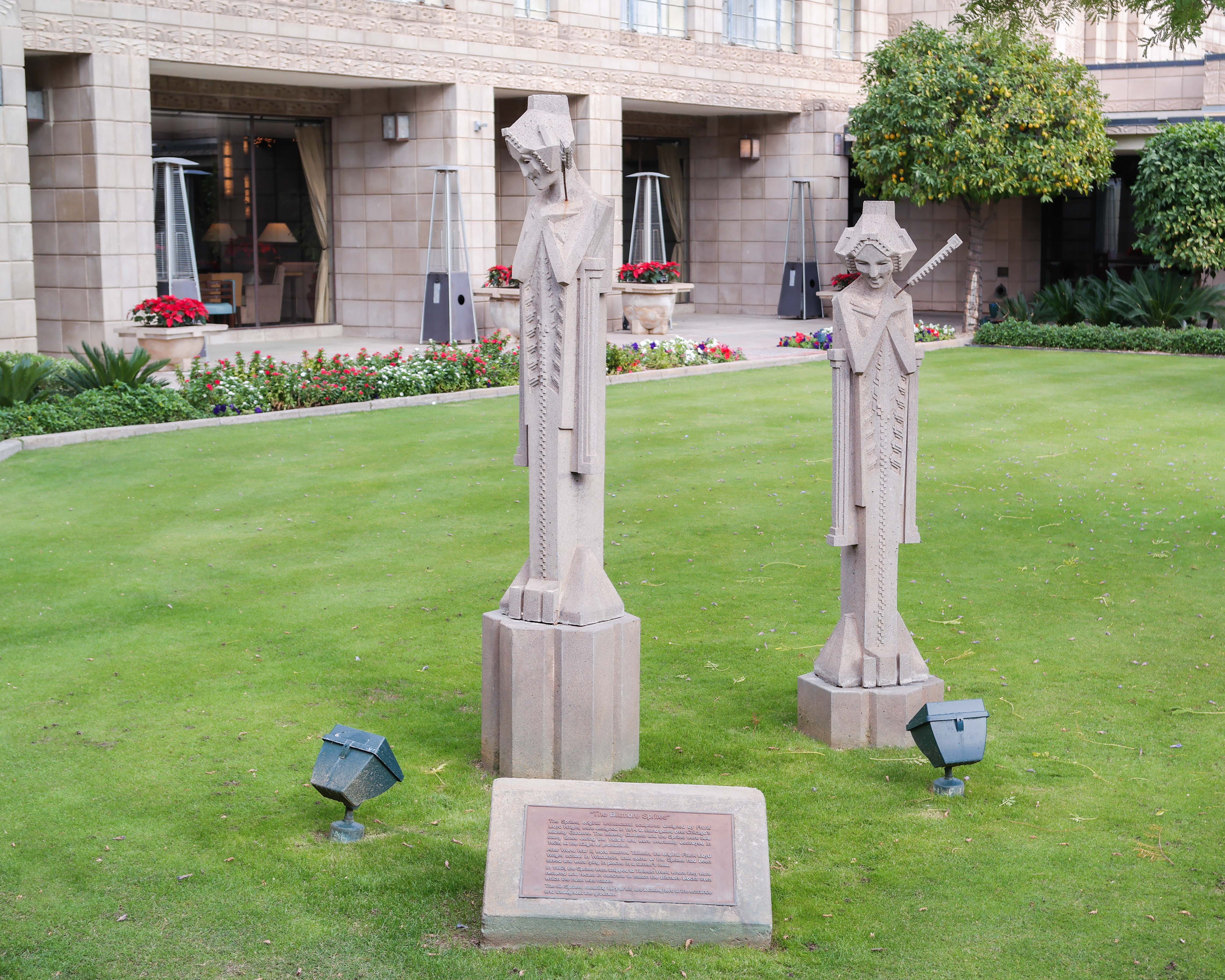
The Frank Lloyd Wright Sprites statues were made in 1914 and adorned the Midway Gardens in Chicago. After World War II, they were in a state of abandonment and in pieces. They were restored and became part of the Arizona Biltmore Hotel gardens in 1985.

== See also ==
- List of historic properties in Phoenix, Arizona
- Phoenix Historic Property Register
