= Albert Chase McArthur =

American architect (1881–1951)

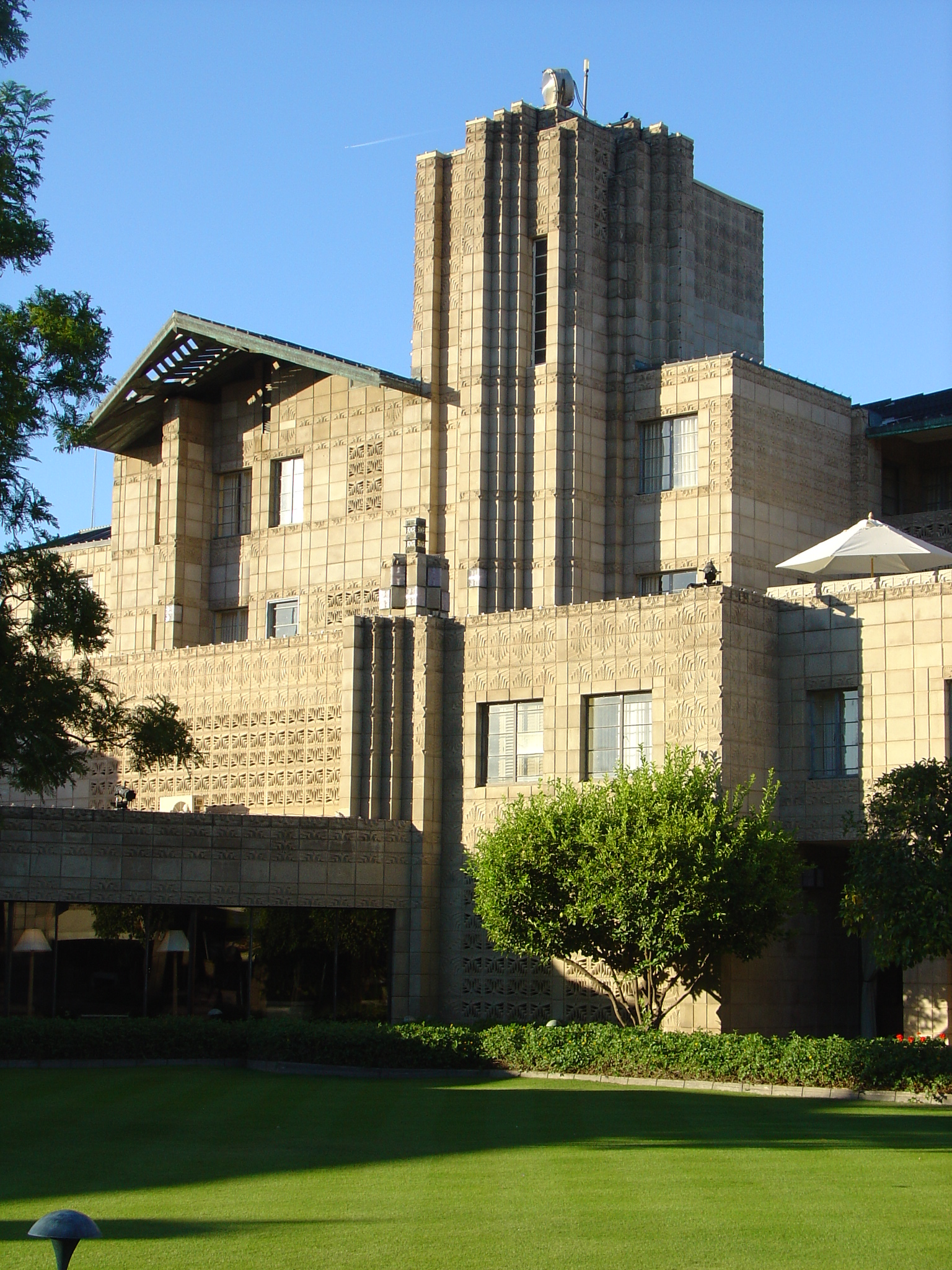
Arizona Biltmore

Albert Chase McArthur (February 2, 1881 – March 1951) was a Prairie School architect, and the designer of the Arizona Biltmore Hotel in Phoenix, Arizona.

== Early years ==
Albert McArthur was born on February 2, 1881, in Dubuque, Iowa. He was the eldest of the three sons of Warren McArthur Sr. and Minnie Jewel McArthur née Chase. Warren McArthur Sr. was a business partner with Edward Everett Boynton in the Hamilton Lantern Company, and it was through McArthur that Boynton commissioned Frank Lloyd Wright to build the Edward E. Boynton House (1908) in Rochester, New York.

Warren McArthur Sr. was sometimes referred to as the "Pioneer Salesman of Tubular Lanterns". He was the executive sales manager of the C. T. Ham Company of Rochester NY, the R. E. Deitz Company of Chicago and other affiliated lamp-production companies. In 1912 Warren McArthur Jr. designed what has been called the Short-Globe Tubular Lantern.

For Warren McArthur, Frank Lloyd Wright designed the McArthur House of 1892, 4852 South Kenwood Avenue in Chicago, Illinois. It is one of Wright's so-called "bootleg" houses; a two-story house with Roman brick halfway up the first floor exterior, and a Louis Sullivanstyle arched main entrance. This was among the houses that led to Wright's dismissal from Sullivan's employ.

Albert McArthur was educated at the Armour Institute of Technology (later the Illinois Institute of Technology) in Chicago and attended Harvard University in the class of 1905. Though he never graduated he was later asked to be the first president of the Harvard Club of Phoenix.

McArthur worked with architect Frank Lloyd Wright between 1907 and 1909. This practice was a remarkable collection of creative architectural designers. As his son, John Lloyd Wright, says,

"William Drummond, Francis Barry Byrne, Walter Burley Griffin, Albert McArthur, Marion Mahony, Isabel Roberts and George Willis were the draftsmen. Five men, two women. They wore flowing ties, and smocks suitable to the realm. The men wore their hair like Papa, all except Albert, he didn't have enough hair... I know that each one of them was then making valuable contributions to the pioneering of the modern American architecture for which my father gets the full glory, headaches and recognition today!"

McArthur continued his education in Austria and Italy, opening an architectural firm in Chicago with partner Arthur S. Coffin in 1912. He moved his practice to Phoenix in 1925. The Biltmore is his most important design. In the course of the Great Depression, all three of the McArthur brothers moved to Hollywood, California, in 1932. Albert Chase McArthur died in March 1951 in California.

== The Arizona Biltmore ==
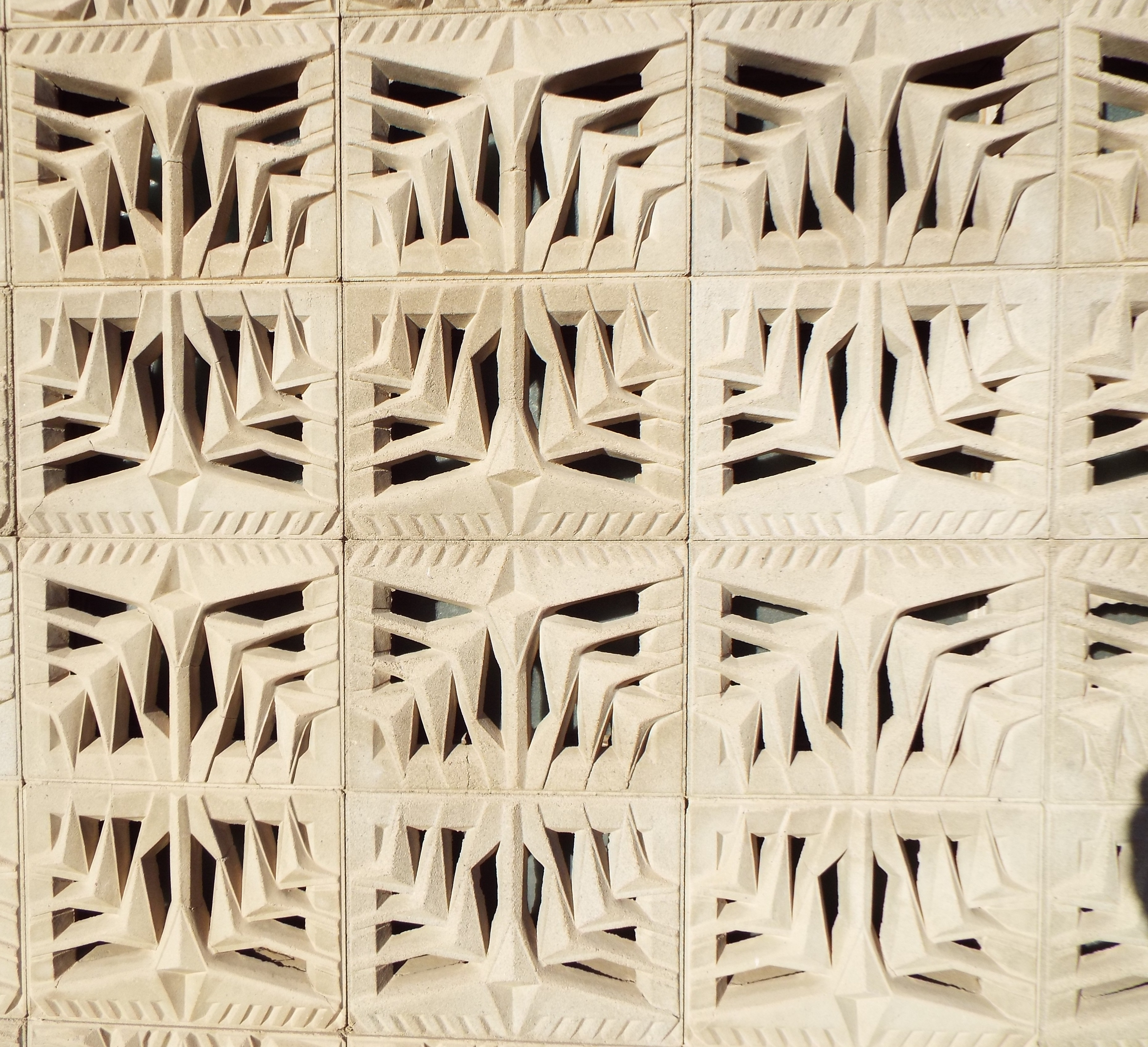
Stylized bricks by architect, Albert Chase McArthur

His brothers, Charles and Warren, Jr., commissioned Albert McArthur to design a resort hotel for them in Phoenix, which is the Arizona Biltmore. Albert contacted Frank Lloyd Wright with an eye toward using Wright's concrete textile block system for the hotel. The system was an ideal choice for material that could be produced on site, especially in the desert of Arizona. McArthur modified the square blocks and made them rectangles, much to Wright's dismay. Wright's presence in Phoenix during construction gave rise to the notion that the hotel was his design and not McArthur's. McArthur had Wright craft a letter stating that the design was indeed McArthur's, claiming " "All I have done in connection with the building of the Arizona Biltmore, near Phoenix, I have done for Albert McArthur himself at his sole request and for none other. Albert McArthur is the architect of that building—all attempts to take that credit from him are gratuitous and beside the mark." However, in subsequent years, Wright never actively dissuaded speculation about the extent of his involvement.

There are other works by Albert Chase McArthur in the Phoenix area including a residence for M. D. B. Morgan, completed in 1927, and several houses in the Phoenix Country Club area.
