= Edward E. Boynton House =

House in Rochester, New York

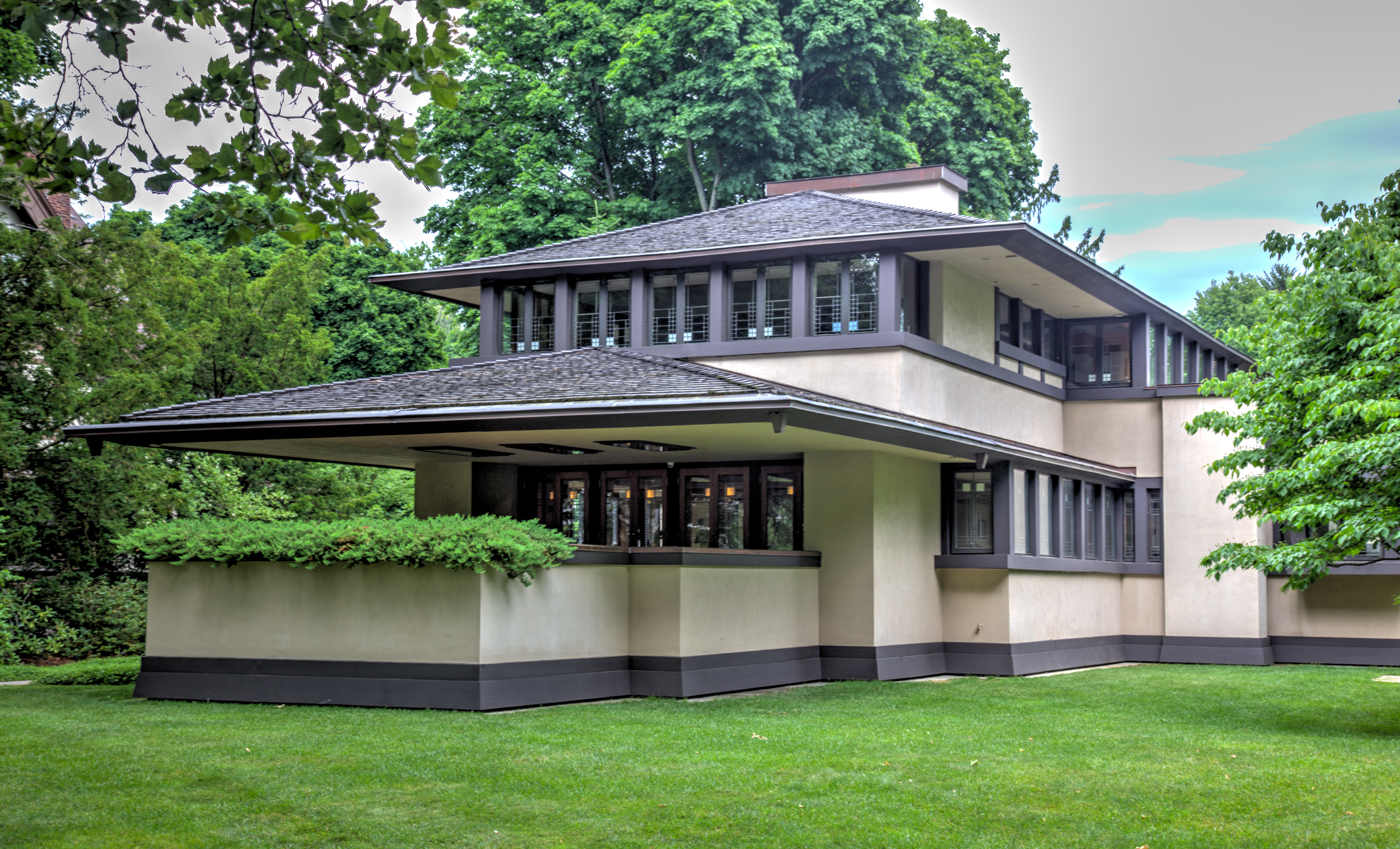

- Location within New York

General information
- Type: House
- Architectural style: Prairie School
- Location: 16 East Boulevard, Rochester, New York
- Coordinates: 43.146575°N 77.569275°W
- Construction started: 1908
- Client: Edward E. Boynton
- Governing body: Private

Design and construction
- Architect: Frank Lloyd Wright

The Edward E. Boynton House (1908) was designed by Frank Lloyd Wright in Rochester, New York. This privately owned prairie-style home was commissioned by widower Edward Everett Boynton and his teenage daughter Beulah Boynton. According to Beulah Boynton (recounted to Times Union reporter William Ringle in 1955) it cost her father between $45,000 – $50,000 for the house, the lot and the contents – a staggering sum in 1908 (adjusted for inflation, $1.14–1.26 million in 2025). This two-story, approximately 5,500 square foot home, was originally situated on an acre lot in the city of Rochester. Seventeen pieces of original Frank Lloyd Wright furniture remain in the house.

== History ==
=== Home ownership timeline ===
- 1908 – 1919 Edward and Beulah Boynton
- 1919 – 1921 J. Oswald Dailey (June 1, 1919 – April 18, 1921)
- 1921 – 1925 Title transferred to Florence C. Dailey who defaulted loan and the Rochester Trust and Safe Deposit Company took control during this period
- 1925 – 1942 Elizabeth J. Burns (October 19, 1925).
- Listed for sale in 1940. Bank took control by 1942.
- 1943 – 1968 Arlene E. Howard (October 7, 1943 – June 27, 1968)
- 1968 – 1974 Dr. David and Carolyn Tinling (June 27, 1968 – June 27, 1974)
- 1974 – 1977 Louis (Louie) and Joan Clark (June 27, 1974 – June 29, 1977)
- 1977 – 1994 J. Burton (Burt) and Karen Brown (June 29, 1977 – January 10, 1994)
- 1994 – 1996 Gordon (Gordie) Nye (January 10, 1994 – November 1, 1996)
- 1996 – 2009 Scott and Kathryn McDonald (November 1, 1996 – November 30, 2009)
- 2009 – Fran Cosentino and Jane Parker (November 30, 2009 – present)

=== Edward Everett Boynton ===
Edward Everett Boynton was a successful lantern salesman and partner in the C. T. Ham Manufacturing Co. of Rochester. Despite his financial success, Boynton's personal life was marked by tragedy. Three of his four children died at a young age, including his daughter Beulah's twin sister Bessie. On April 13, 1900 (Friday the 13th) his wife died. Beulah told Times Union Reporter William Ringle, "My father had no hobbies but me." When Boynton decided to move out of his home at 44 Vick Park B in Rochester, New York he commissioned Frank Lloyd Wright to design what would become Rochester's only Wright-designed home. Beulah Boynton recalled, "I wanted Claude Bragdon to build our house. My father was quite taken with Wright." Edward Boynton learned of Frank Lloyd Wright through a business partner, Warren McArthur. Wright designed the Warren McArthur House in the Kenwood District of Chicago in 1892. In 1906, Boynton commissioned the architect to design a home on an expansive piece of property on East Boulevard. Construction started in 1907 and the house was completed in 1908. Beulah Boynton was a teenager when she met Frank Lloyd Wright. She became very interested and involved in the design and construction of house. "I learned to read specs. I spotted an error in the masons laying the fireplace."

The original deed to the property was recorded on May 13, 1907 and the building permit (certificate of occupancy) was granted on May 15, 1908. "The building permit, #10988, lists a two story frame and plaster dwelling, 5h'~ x 115', valuation, $10,000." Boynton was listed as "builder-owner" on the building permit, Frank Lloyd Wright as architect, and the contractors were Gorsline and Swan." George T. Swan, son of the late George L. Swan, recalled his father saying, "The contractors expected trouble with Wright but discovered to their surprise and delight that reasonably amicable relations with him were possible so long as they adhered exactly to his specifications and instructions." He continued, "He made no great trial for contractors," said Swan, "but he gave the workmen fits." I was too young to have known Mr. Wright but I heard a great deal about him from my father.

Originally the Edward E. Boynton house occupied an approximately one acre lot. In addition to the 5,450 square foot residence, the property was home to a 30-foot by 60-foot reflecting pool, a tennis court, magnificent gardens and 28 American elm trees. The driveway stretched the length of a city block – from East Boulevard to Hawthorn Street.

=== 1908–1919: Boynton House ===
Beulah and Edward Boynton lived at 16 East Boulevard for ten years. During that period, the Boyntons (one of the early automobile owners in the area) erected a garage on the property. Edward Boynton employed a cook, two maids (one for upstairs, one for downstairs), and two gardeners (one doubled as the chauffeur) during their stay. After Beulah Boynton married Ransom Noble Kalbfleisch, he moved into the Boynton house joining his bride and her father. A daughter, Jean, was born in 1914. In 1919 Beulah and Jean moved to New York City with Kalbfleisch so he could work at the stock exchange. Edward Boynton joined them in New York and lived with them until his death on December 27, 1938.

The house sat vacant for a year until June 1, 1919 until J. Oswald Dailey purchased it.

=== 1919–1940: Upheaval ===
The 1920s were a tumultuous time for both the country and the Boynton house. According to family members, Dailey lost all of his money and his wife's money speculating in commodity futures. In a financial bind, Dailey subdivided the property into two building lots that he sold for $22,000. The tennis court, formal gardens, pool, and fountain were removed. Two additional homes were built on the original Boynton plot, "one on Hawthorn Street, at the back of the property, and the other on East Boulevard. (Beulah recalled during an interview with William Ringle in 1955, "There are now three other houses on what was the original lot. The porch was originally open, now it's glassed in.") On April 18, 1921, the title to Wright's Boynton house was transferred to Florence C. Dailey. She failed make the loan payments and the bank took control. On October 19, 1925, Elizabeth J. Burns assumed the $18,000 mortgage held by the Rochester Trust and Safe Deposit Company.

=== 1932: Frank Lloyd Wright returns to Rochester ===
When he was 65 years old Frank Lloyd Wright returned to Rochester after an invitation to speak to a sold out crowd at the Memorial Art Gallery. On November 14, 1932, accompanied by Memorial Art Gallery Director Gertrude Moore, Mr. Wright drove by the Edward E. Boynton House and was enraged by the sight of the current diminished lot and external drainage pipes originating from the roof. Decades later Democrat & Chronicle reporter Katharine Seelye interviewed Gertrude Moore. Ms. Moore recounted, Wright literally "rose in his wrath before her eyes...and in his distress banged his head on the ceiling of the cab. The driver was ordered on." "They've wrapped conductor pipes around my plane spaces!" he shrieked. "They have destroyed my house!" Still reeling from the sight of his house, Frank Lloyd Wright ranted throughout his evening lecture at the Memorial Art Gallery. "Mr. Wright came to the platform (at the gallery) under a cloud of pessimism," the Democrat and Chronicle reported the next day. "He expressed himself as well convinced that no words of his could awaken the modern individual to the degradation of (contemporary) architecture (which was) 'pseudo this and pseudo that and never expressive of himself or his surroundings.'" Ms. Moore reimbursed the architect for his hotel bill and railroad fare but requested a downward adjustment to his speaking fee. Frank Lloyd Wright never returned to Rochester again.

=== 1940–1968: The Boynton House's longest resident ===
In 1940, the house was listed for $16,500, but languished on the market. By 1942, the bank assumed the mortgage once again.

Arlene E. Howard purchased the house on October 7, 1943 for $8,000. She owned the house for almost 25 years. Ms. Howard painted several rooms and some of the original Wright-designed furniture, throughout the house. Toward the end of her tenure, Ms. Howard rarely visited the house and spent the majority of her time with her brother on her boat in Florida. When her housekeeper died, the house remained empty and neglected. The roof was repaired in 1967, but continued to cause problems.

=== 1968–1974: Boynton House ===
Dr. David Tinling, his wife Carolyn, and their four young children moved into the house on June 27, 1968. They purchased the Boynton House for $57,000. Dr. Tinling thought the house looked perfect. His wife Carolyn remembered the house in need of serious repairs. Incredibly, the carpets were still original and seventeen pieces of the original Frank Lloyd Wright-designed furniture remained in the house. The Tinlings pursued landmark status for the house and created legal covenants for the home's structure. In 1969, the City of Rochester passes a preservation ordinance, designating the Frank Lloyd Wright's Boynton House an official Rochester landmark. The original furniture was omitted from the protective covenants. In March 1973, University of Toronto professor H. Allen Brooks wrote to the Landmark Society of Western New York pointing out the importance of preserving the provenance of the furniture. At the same time, the Tinlings' marriage was unraveling forcing the sale of the Boynton House.

Frank Lloyd Wright's Edward E. Boynton House was officially listed for sale, in 1973, for $82,500.

=== 1974–1977: The public sees the Boynton House ===
The house was enshrouded in bushes when it went on the market. Greenery flanked either side of the house above the second story roof. Louis and Joan Clark offered the Tinlings $55,000 which was rejected. Their second offer for $68,000 was accepted. The Clarks ripped out and thinned most of the trees and bushes surrounding the house, removed the old, dirty carpets, updated the heating system, repaired the plumbing, fixed some electrical issues and started stripping the paint from the woodwork throughout the house. They also opened up the house for fee-based tours. Over 2,000 people toured the Boynton House during the first two years the Clarks owned the house. Interested in obtaining museum status and continuing their tours, the Clarks reached out to the City of Rochester Zoning Board. The president of the neighborhood association, Dr. R. Paul Miller, wrote an opinion piece for the Rochester Times Union opposing the idea. As a result of the neighborhood backlash, the constant repairs and several burglaries to the Boynton House, the Clarks decided they had enough. They alerted Rochester Times Union columnist Peter Taub that they are considering putting the house on the market. On April 29, 1977 his column appeared in the paper – Wright House Up for Sale.

=== 1977–1994: Protective covenants and complete roof replacement ===
The Edward E. Boynton House never officially hit the real estate market. After seeing Peter Taub's column, Burt and Karen Brown dealt directly with Louis and Joan Clark and acquired the house in a story recounted 40 years later in their daughter's memoir Growing Up in a Frank Lloyd Wright House. Several last minute negotiations over the house almost doom the deal between the Clarks and the Browns. The 1969 protective covenants set up by the Tinlings only pertain to the exterior structure of the house, not the 17 pieces of Wright-designed furniture. The Clarks want another $15,000–$25,000 for the furniture – on top of the $110,000 price tag for the house and the $25,000 agreed upon price for all the oriental rugs. The Browns appeal to the Landmark Society of Western New York (LSWNY) and eventually a deal is brokered where the LSWNY pays the Clarks for the furniture and then leases the Wright designed pieces back to the Browns for $1.00 a year for 75 years. According to the deal, the furniture pieces cannot be moved to the basement or attic and no alterations (painting, reupholstering, stripping, etc.) can be made without prior approval. Insurance, repairs, and restoration costs are the responsibility of the lessee. With the real estate deal with the Clarks complete, the Browns created a contract with the LSWNY making the protective covenants official, this time covering the original furniture.

Burt and Karen Brown continued the Clarks' restorations projects – removing wallpaper and plush carpet in addition to stripping paint from the furniture, wood trim, radiator covers and Wright's built-ins. The tour schedule is curtailed – limited to architect students and professors, community and charitable organizations and their daughter's girl scout troop and her fourth grade classmates. The Browns also replaced the roof which takes over two years to build from scratch (in hand soldered copper) and costs nearly $100,000 in 1977–1979.

After 24 years working at Xerox Corporation, Burt Brown accepted a severance package and, with their two kids in college, Burt and Karen Brown moved to Orlando, Florida. The house proves too costly to remain vacant on a part-time basis and is put on the market, in the spring of 1993, for $895,000. The original furniture pieces are all professionally repaired by the Rochester conservator Ralph Weigandt and Mark Gervase, a Michigan based conservator from the Henry Ford Museum. After languishing on the market for months, a new realtor is hired and the house is relisted, for $460,000, in the fall of 1993.

=== 1994–1996: Neglect and abandonment ===
Gordon Nye, an executive for sporting goods manufacturer Voit, purchased the house in January 1994 for $425,000. Being from California, Nye and his girlfriend moved into the house and immediately struggled with living in Rochester and operating under some of the restrictive house rules. The Landmark Society of Western New York worried about their two large dogs and the safety of the original Wright-designed furniture. Concerned about his dogs escaping, Nye commissioned plans for a fence to enclose the property. The plans are rejected by the Landmark Society and Preservation Board. Nye applied for a construction permit and built an unsightly chain link fence around the property as a work around. Less than a year after purchasing the house, the homeowners moved back to California and leave it vacant – not paying the utilities, the security system fees and the mortgage. The dining room ceiling leaked and chunks of plaster fell from overhead. Defying the restrictive covenants ("pieces cannot be moved..."), the Landmark Society transferred all seventeen pieces to the Memorial Art Gallery where they reside from July 16, 1995 to January 12, 1996 on public display. The bank begins proceedings to take over the house.

=== 1996–2009: Rebirth and private house ===
Dr. Scott and Kathryn (Katie) McDonald purchase the house 'as is' in November 1996, for $260,000. The couple began repairing and restoring and landscaping the entire property. Scott's father, a craftsman and woodworker, created numerous pieces of craftsman style furniture for his son's new home. Scott was a scholar of Japanese art and a student of Frank Lloyd Wright's work. They worked to preserve the integrity and history of the home. The McDonalds made it selectively available for charity events. They gave birth to a son and gave him the middle name Wright.

They decided to move back to their hometown and put the home on the market in the fall of 2009, for $830,000.

=== 2009 to present ===
An ardent admirer of Frank Lloyd Wright and particularly of his Boynton House, Jane Parker manages to join a realtor's caravan – with a preview of new homes for sale – when she learns that this house is back in the market. After touring the house, she is ready to move in immediately. Her husband, Francis (Fran) Cosentino is skeptical whether the home is in move in condition. After purchasing it and a thorough inspection – the place has many problems – they embark on a massive project to restore and rehabilitate the 100-year-old Boynton House. The roof is sagging; the exterior trim has rotted; termite and carpenter ant damage is evident throughout; in the basement essential support beams have been removed; undersized supports above the dining room are caving-in. Structurally the house is ready to collapse. They begin work in April 2010, hiring Bero Architecture and the landscape architectural firm Bayer Landscape Architecture. Establish a trust to fund the anticipated two year project and consult the Frank Lloyd Wright Foundation for advice and for Wright's original architectural drawings.

Parker/Cosentino decide to restore the enclosed front porch to its original design. Having been enclosed in the 1920s. They construct a new garage inspired by Wright's prairie style designs and incorporate a covered walkway on the property after noticing a pergola in several of Wright's original drawings of the site. Unable to reestablish the extent of the Boyntons original lot, since three other houses now sit on the space that had been sold off in the 1920s – they decide to remove the driveway at the front of the house and, instead of a driveway that stretches from East Boulevard to Hawthorn Street, its entrance on East Boulevard is removed and replaced with only a walkway, in place of both. Thus allowing more grass and a more spacious appearance. A lovely reflecting pool with Koi pond and an Asian inspired garden now occupy the small backyard.

All of the art glass windows, doors, cabinets and light fixtures in the entire house are restored by the Wisconsin native Jeffrey Mueller, owner of Godfrey Müller Studios, a glass restoration company in Rochester. The still extant Wright designed furniture and all the woodwork – some of which had been painted over by previous owners and unprofessional stripped – is now meticulously refinished, repaired, and restored by Eric Norden, owner of Eric Norden Restorations, in Rochester. Several new furniture pieces are designed, in the spirit of a Wright contemporary and collaborator George Niedecken (1878–1945)- in the prairie style tradition. Darryl Gronsky, an interior designer in Rochester, with the contribution of the homeowner Jane Parker, referred to Niedecken's designs archived in the collection of the Milwaukee Art Museum, Milwaukee, Wis. to help select materials and fabrics for the renovated house.

A sculpture by Albert Paley is installed on the grounds.

The building is now part of the East Avenue Historic District, which is listed on the National Register of Historic Places.

== Legacy ==
Jane Parker and Fran Cosentino also consent to produce a documentary, chronicling the repair, rehabilitation and restoration of the Boynton House. Local Public Broadcasting System (PBS) WXXI in Rochester, New York, embarks on a two and a half year filming project, culminating in the nearly one hour documentary titled Frank Lloyd Wright's Boynton House: The Next Hundred Years. The documentary crew are assisted by Kim Bixler, daughter of Burt and Karen Brown who owned the Boynton House from 1977–1994. Her knowledge of the house history includes archival documents, newspaper articles, family histories, meticulous research, historical photographs and interviews with every living homeowner. Her book Growing Up in a Frank Lloyd Wright House is published in conjunction with the completion of the Boynton House project, one of the sponsorship gifts for public television sponsors and donors. Kim Bixler travels the country giving lectures about what it is really like growing up in a house designed by Frank Lloyd Wright.

== Gallery ==
Winter 1968

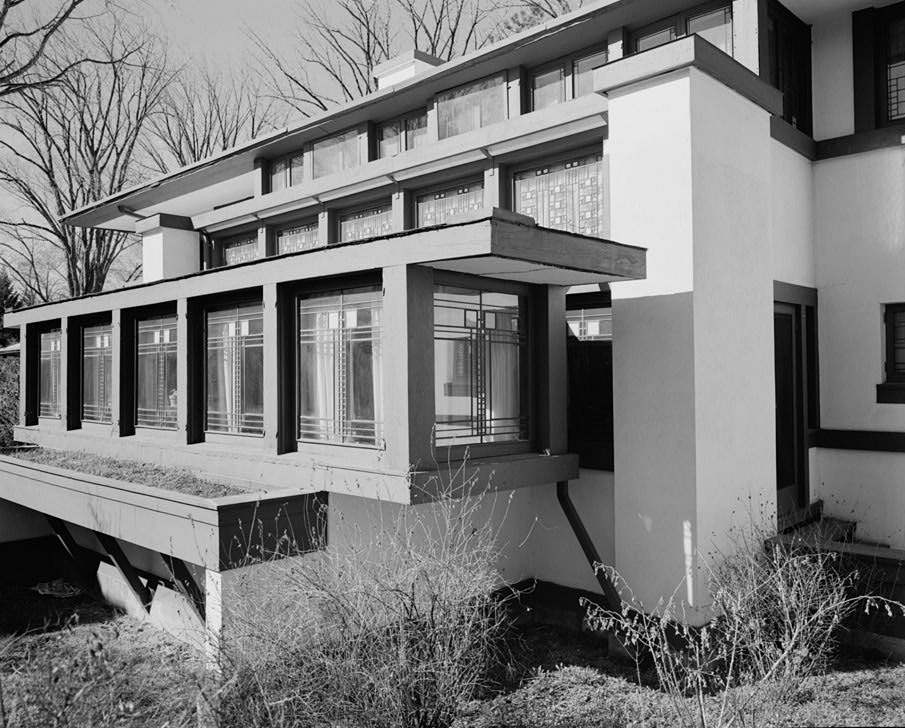
Dining Room, bay windows, Winter 1968

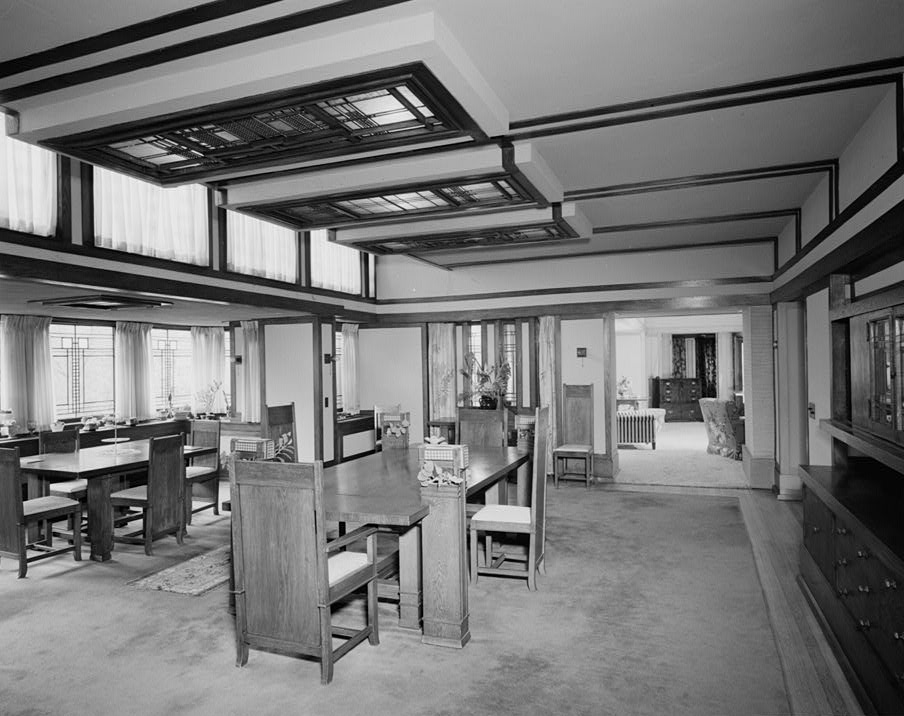
Dining Room, Winter 1968

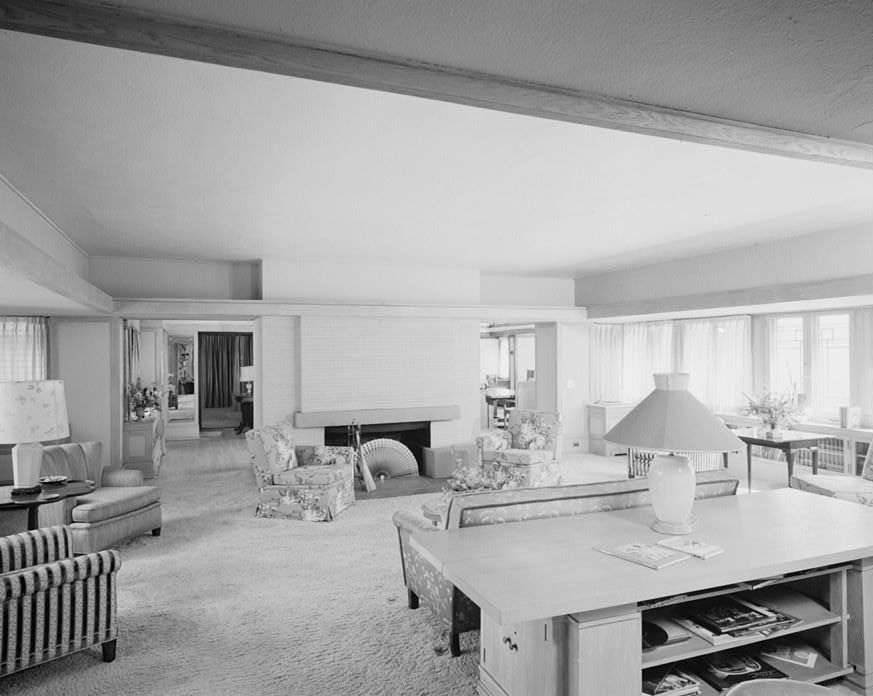
Living Room, Winter 1968

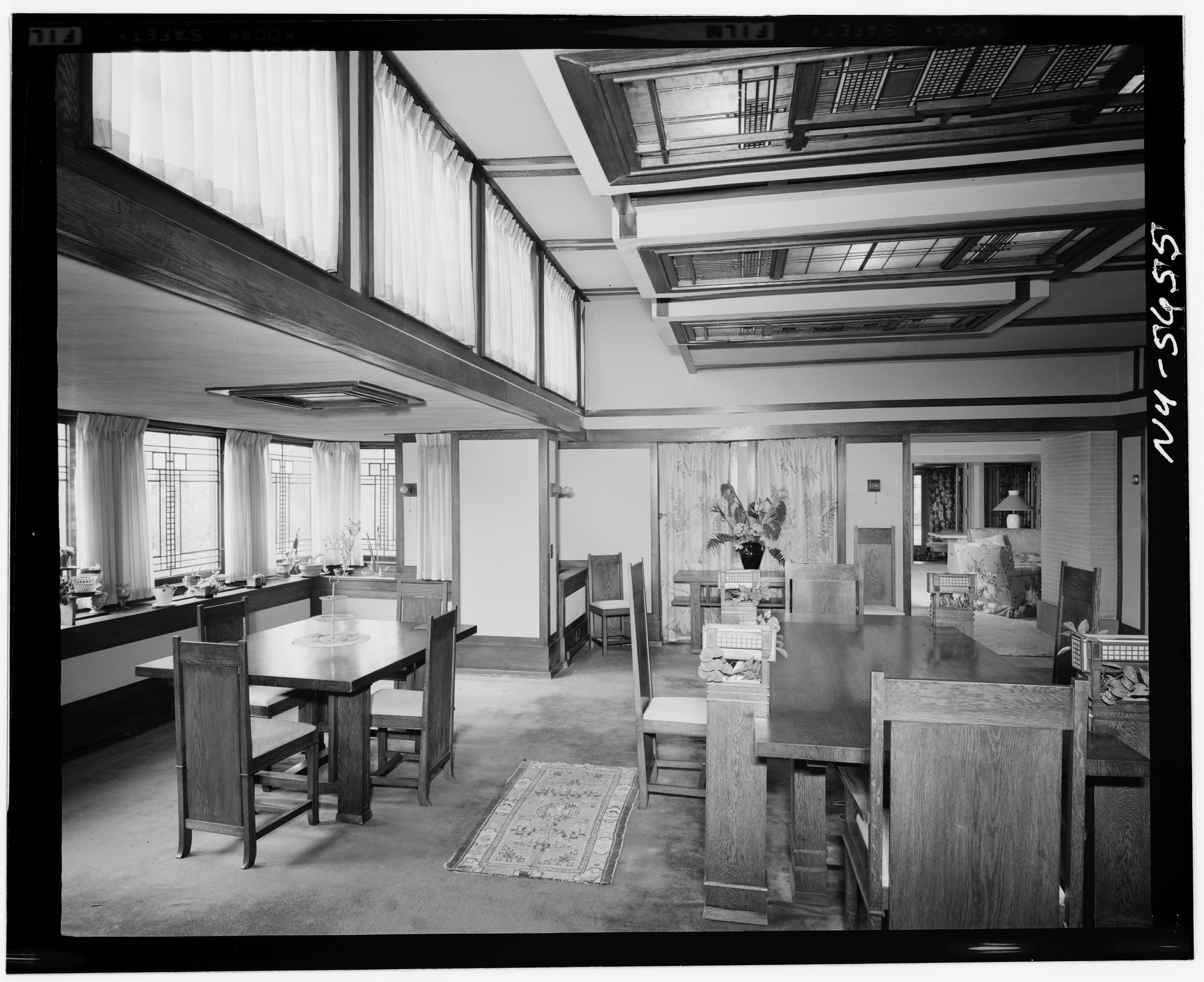
First floor, Winter 1968

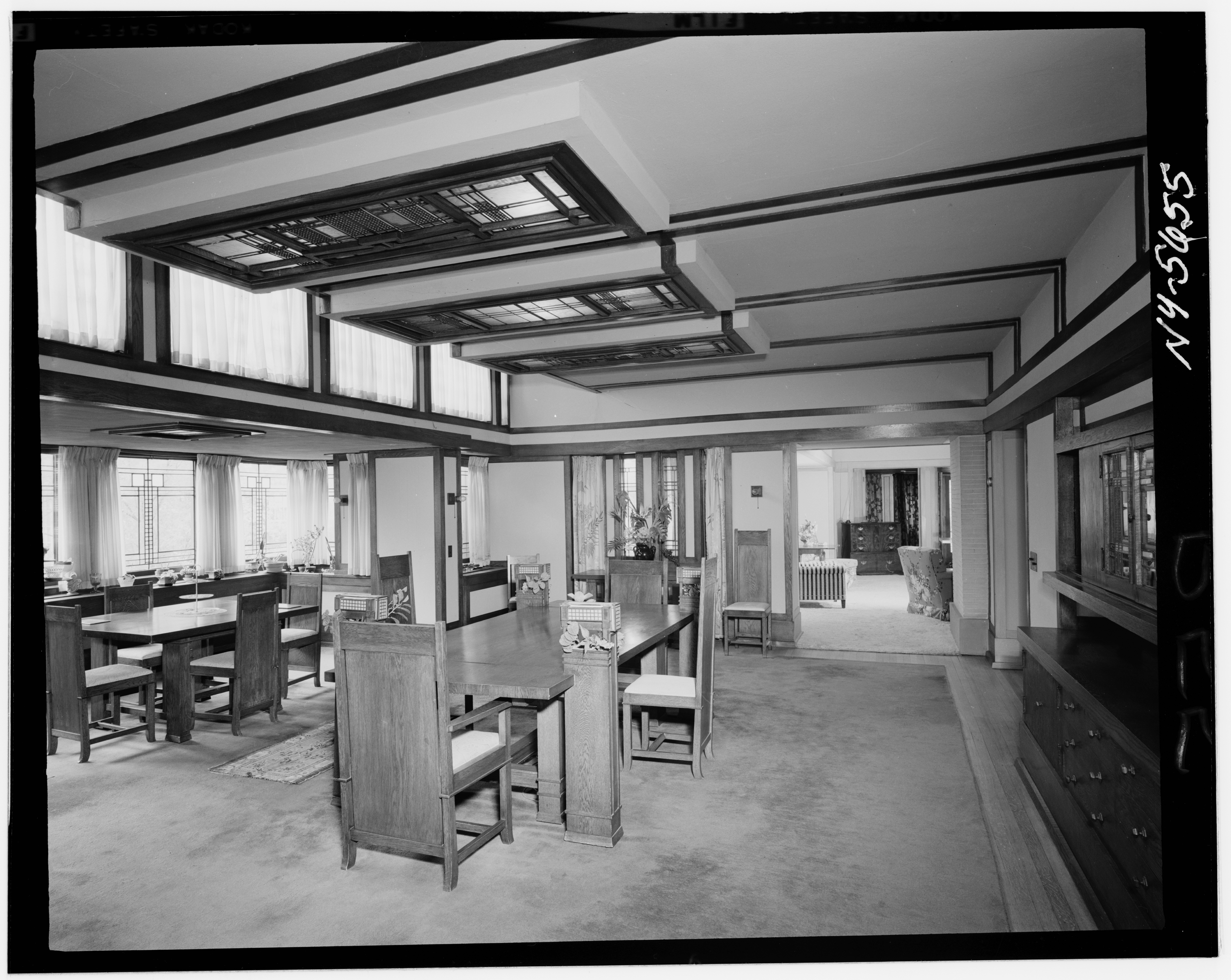
First floor, Winter 1968

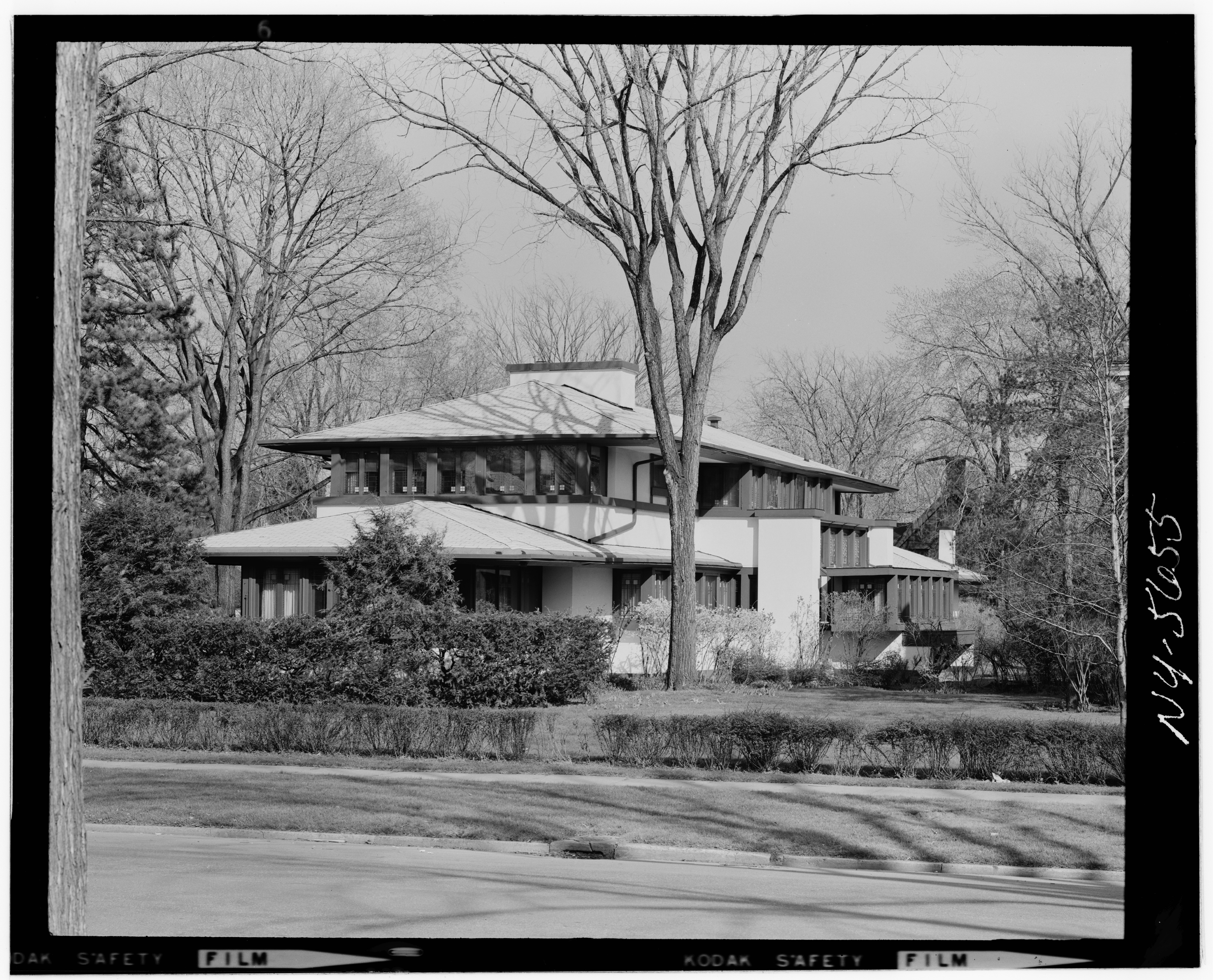
View from Southwest, Winter 1968

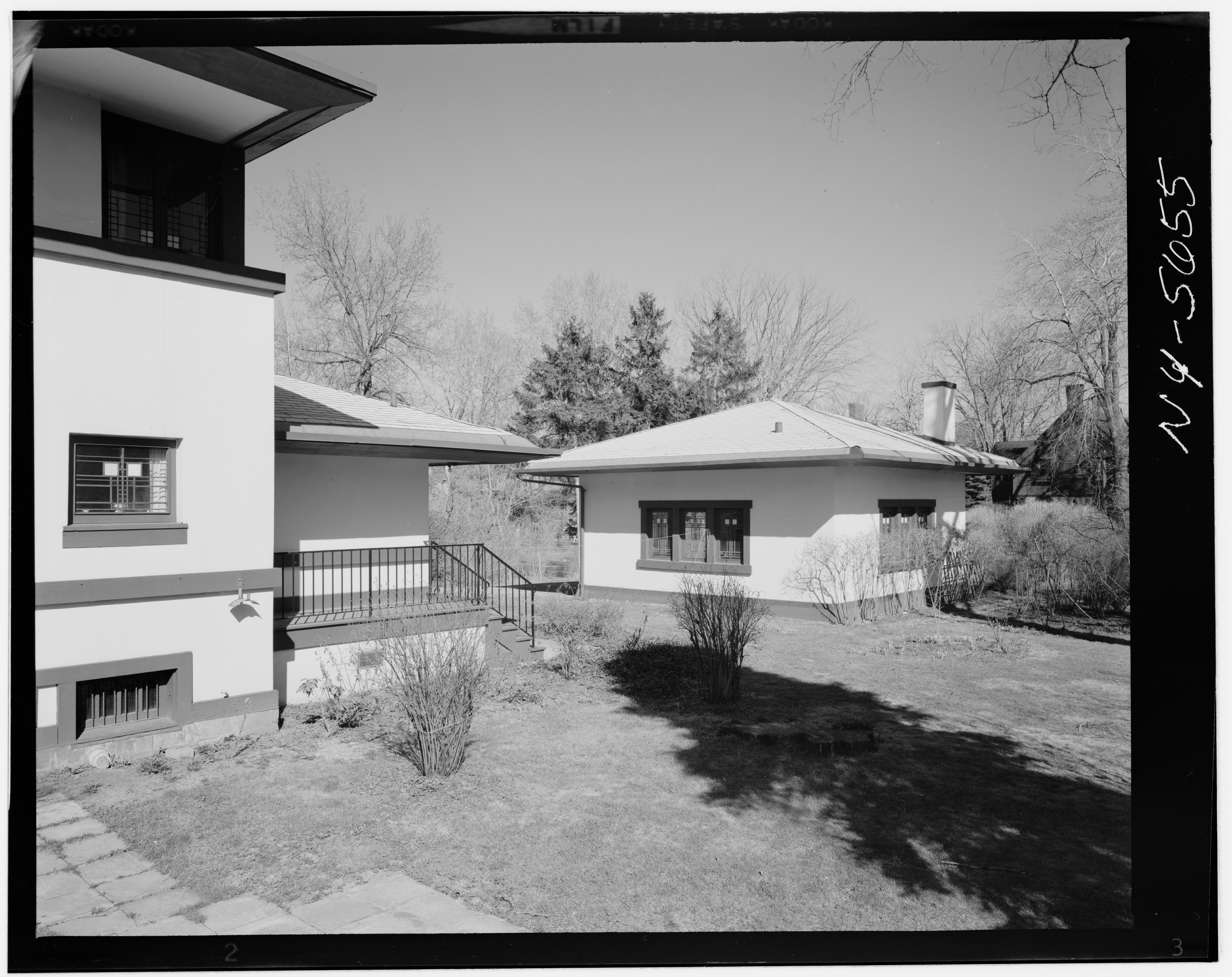
View of rear entrance from Southeast, Winter 1968

Changes to the Boynton House
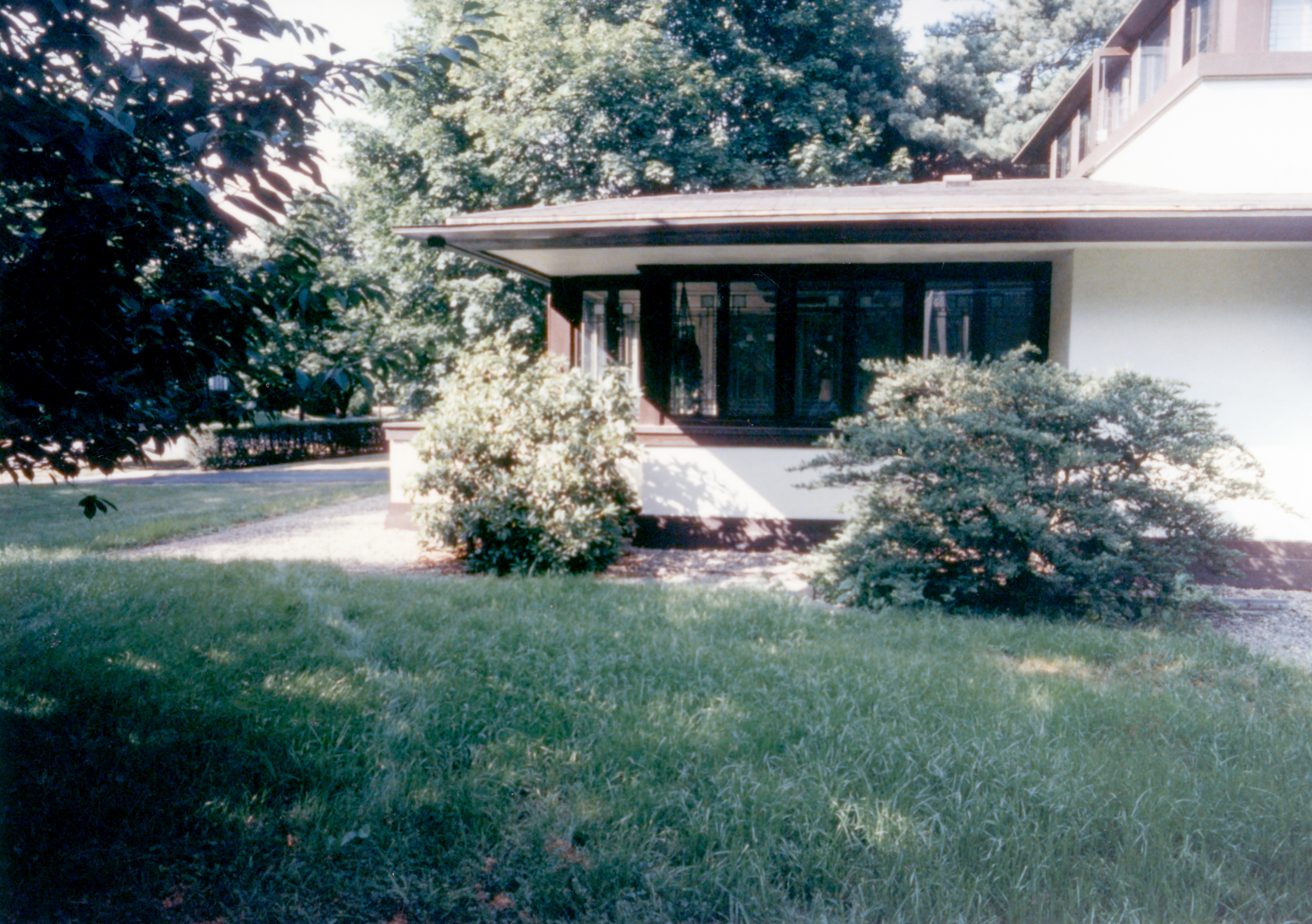
Boynton House Porch from side angle 1986

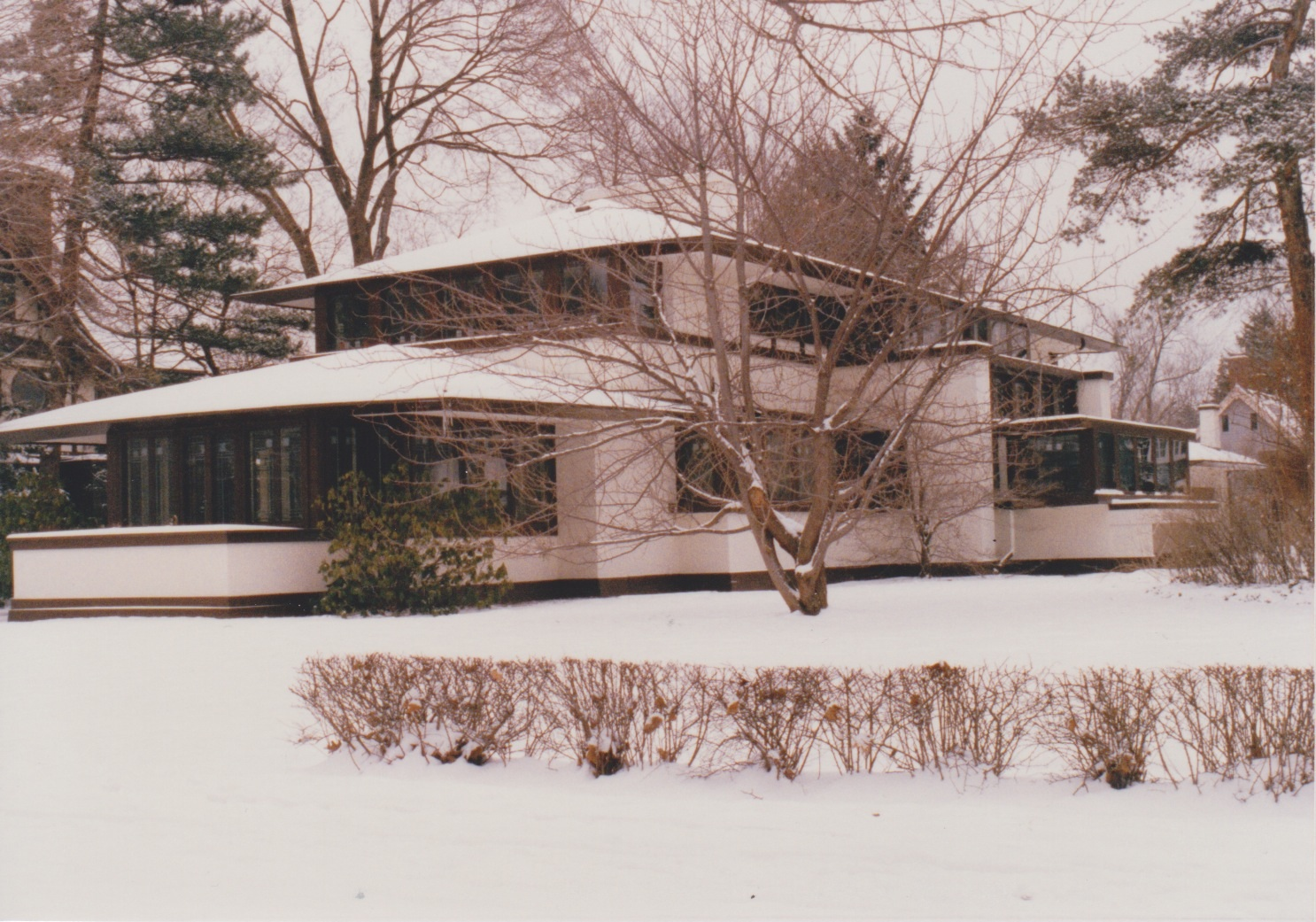
Boynton House Winter Exterior 1993

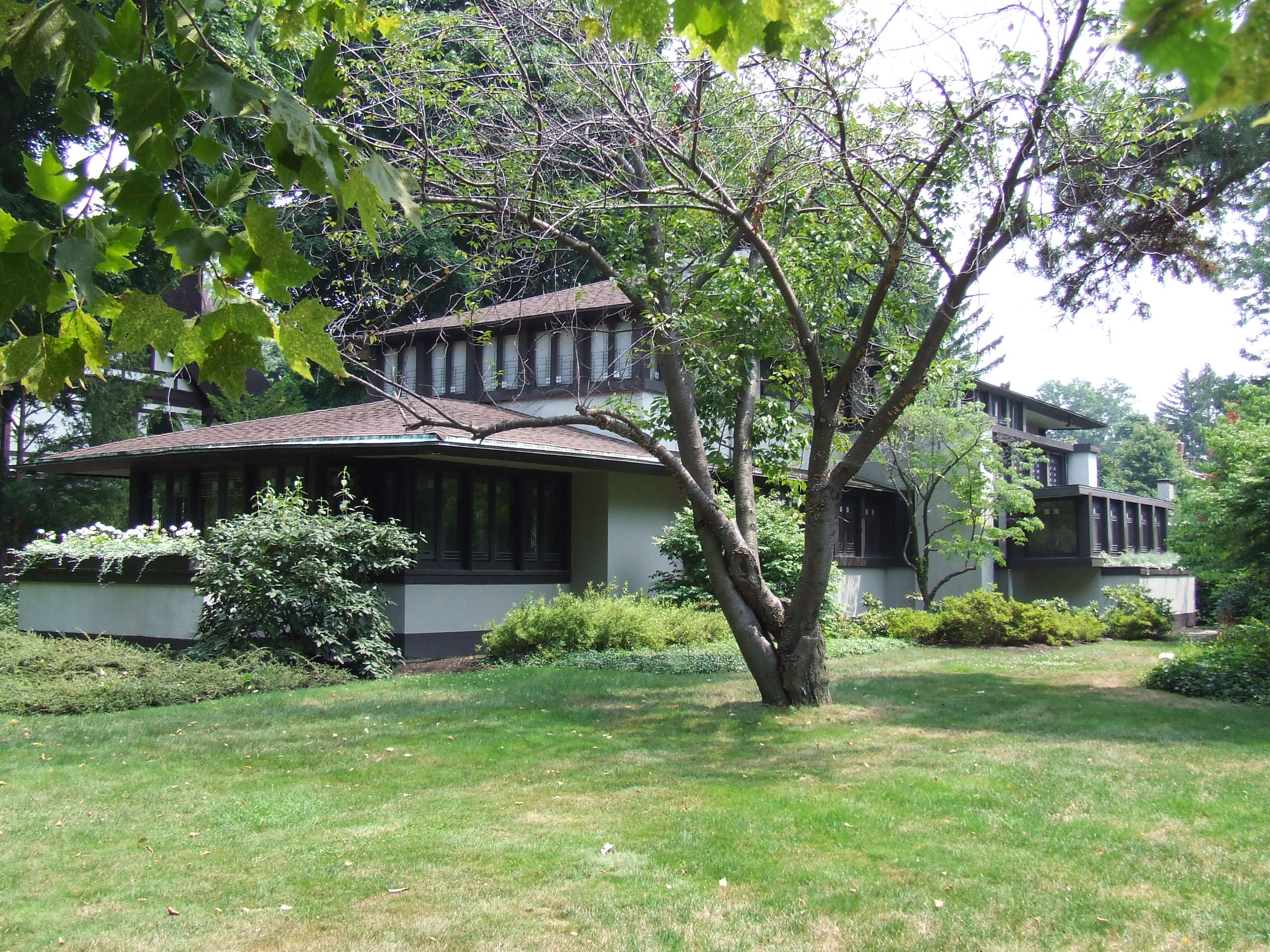
Front view, Summer 2007

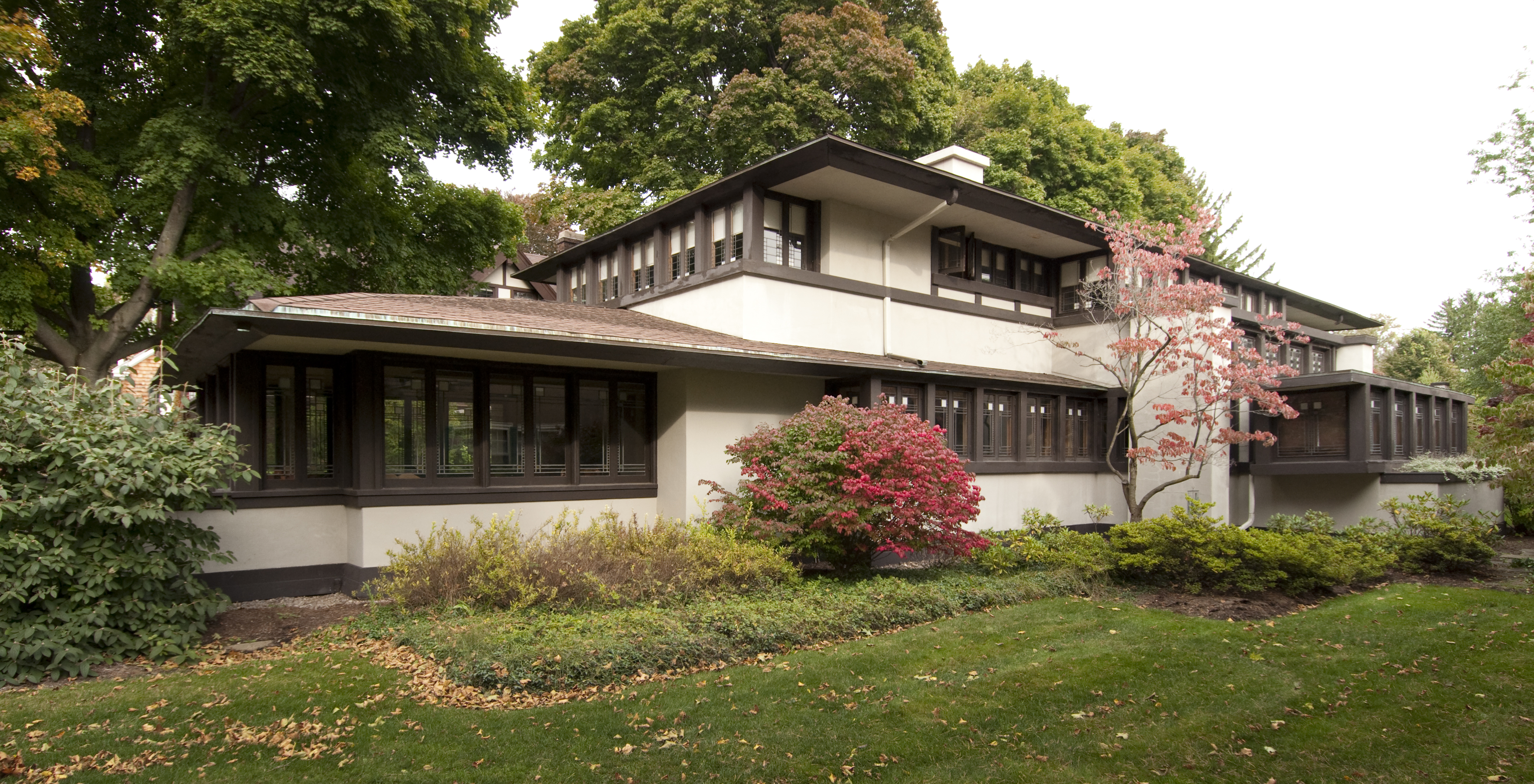
Boynton House Side Exterior 2009 pre renovation

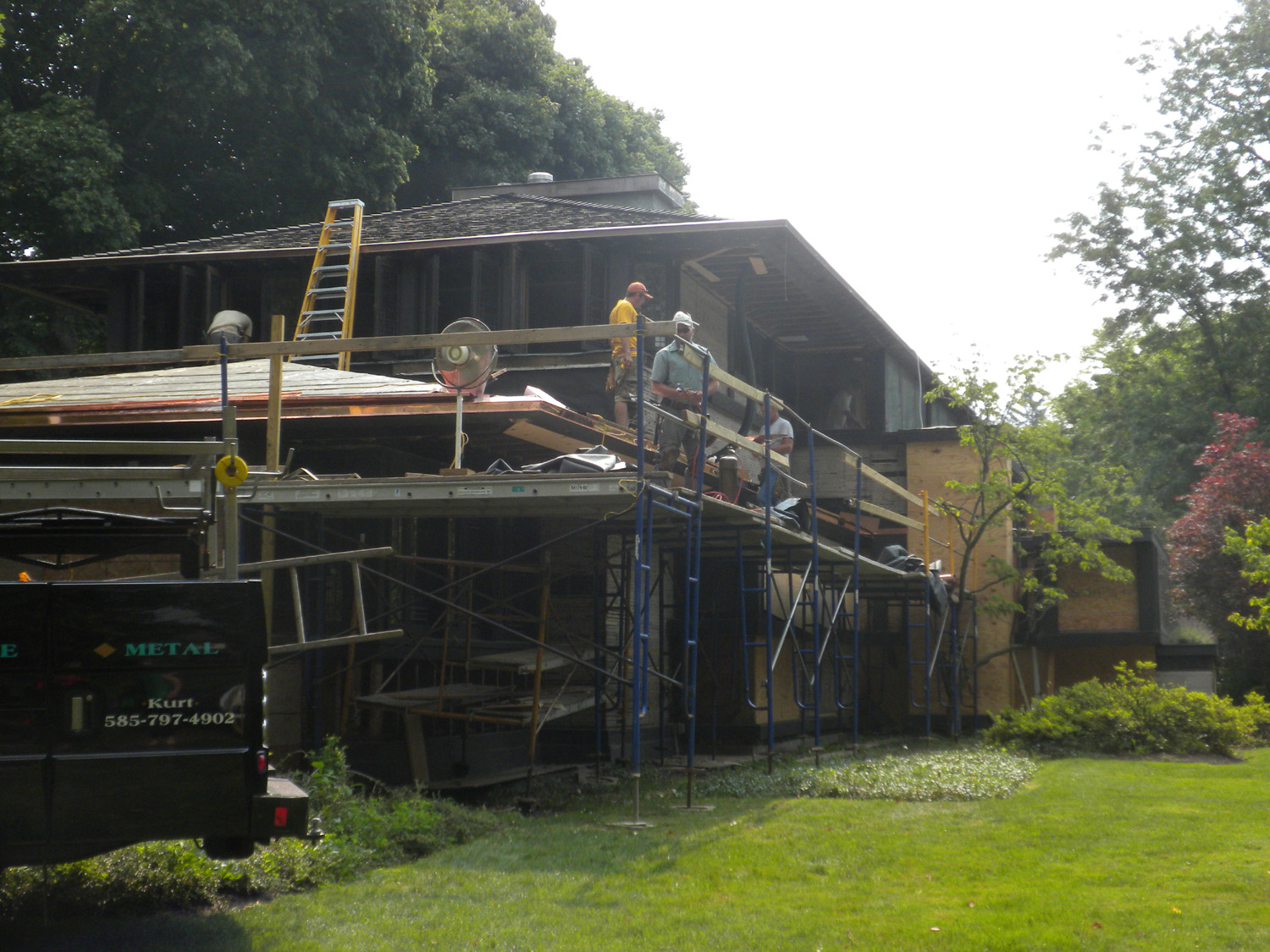
Boynton House Exterior Scaffolding 2011

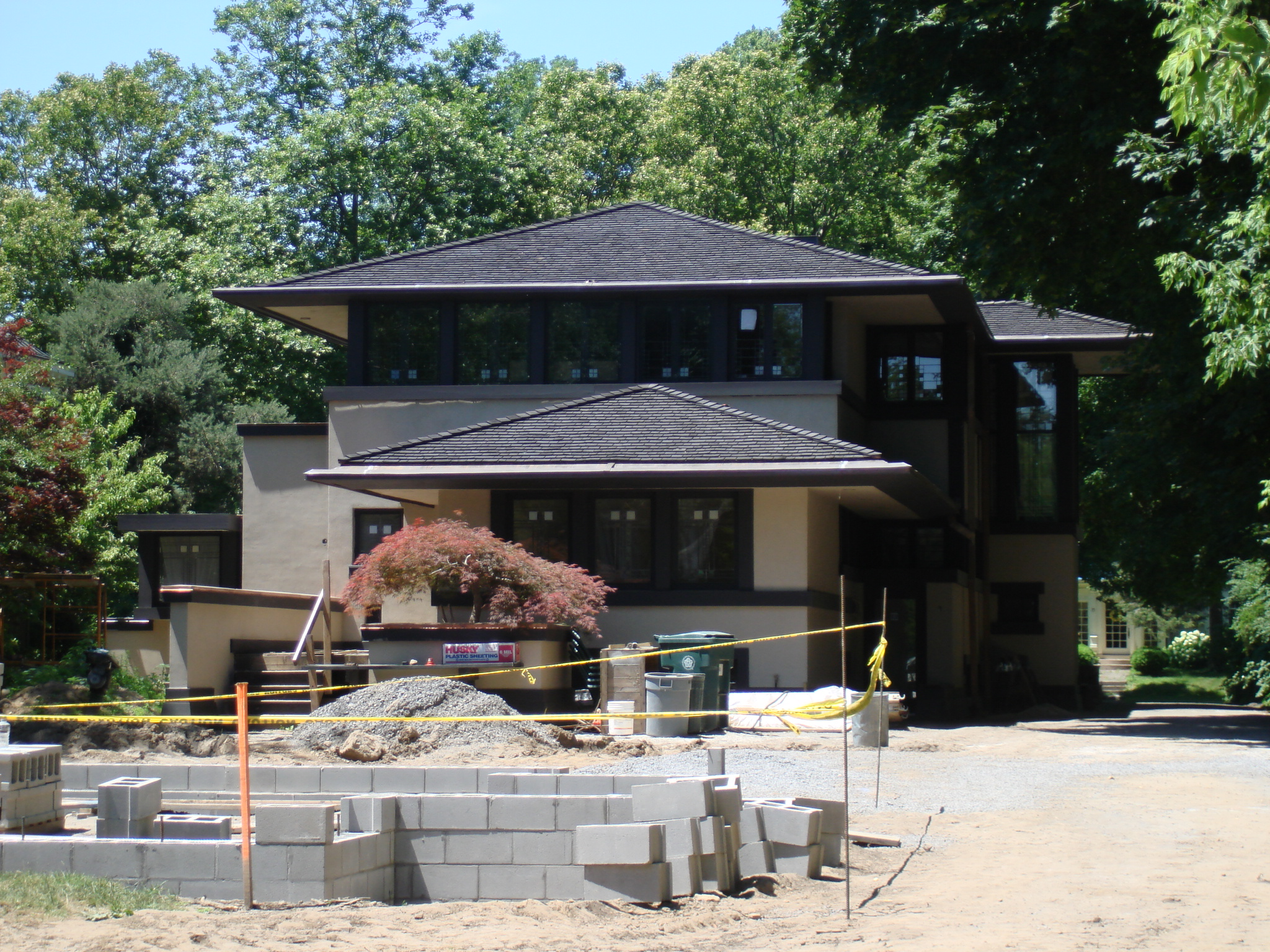
View from Hawthorne Street, Summer 2011

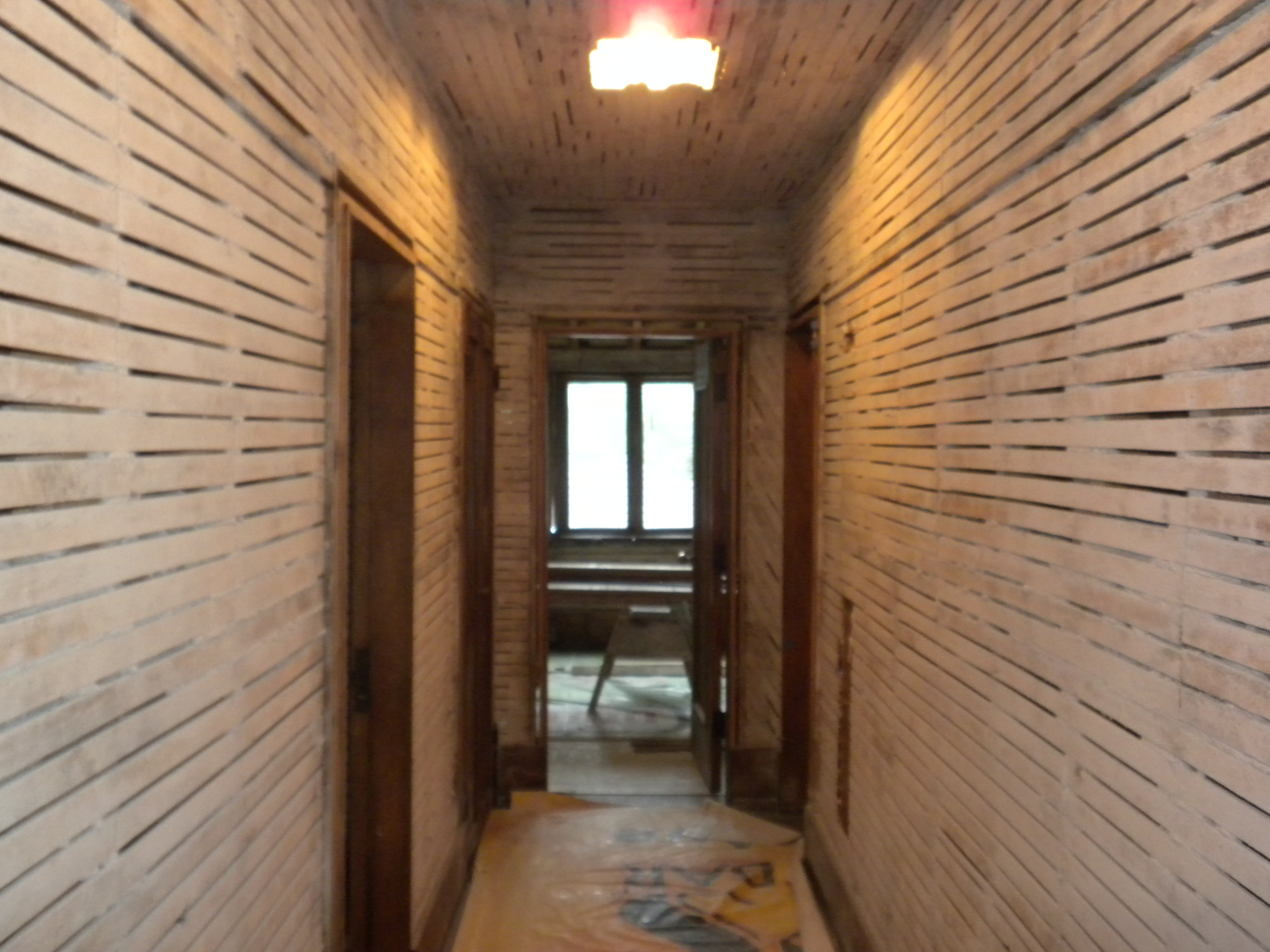
Boynton House hallway under construction 2010

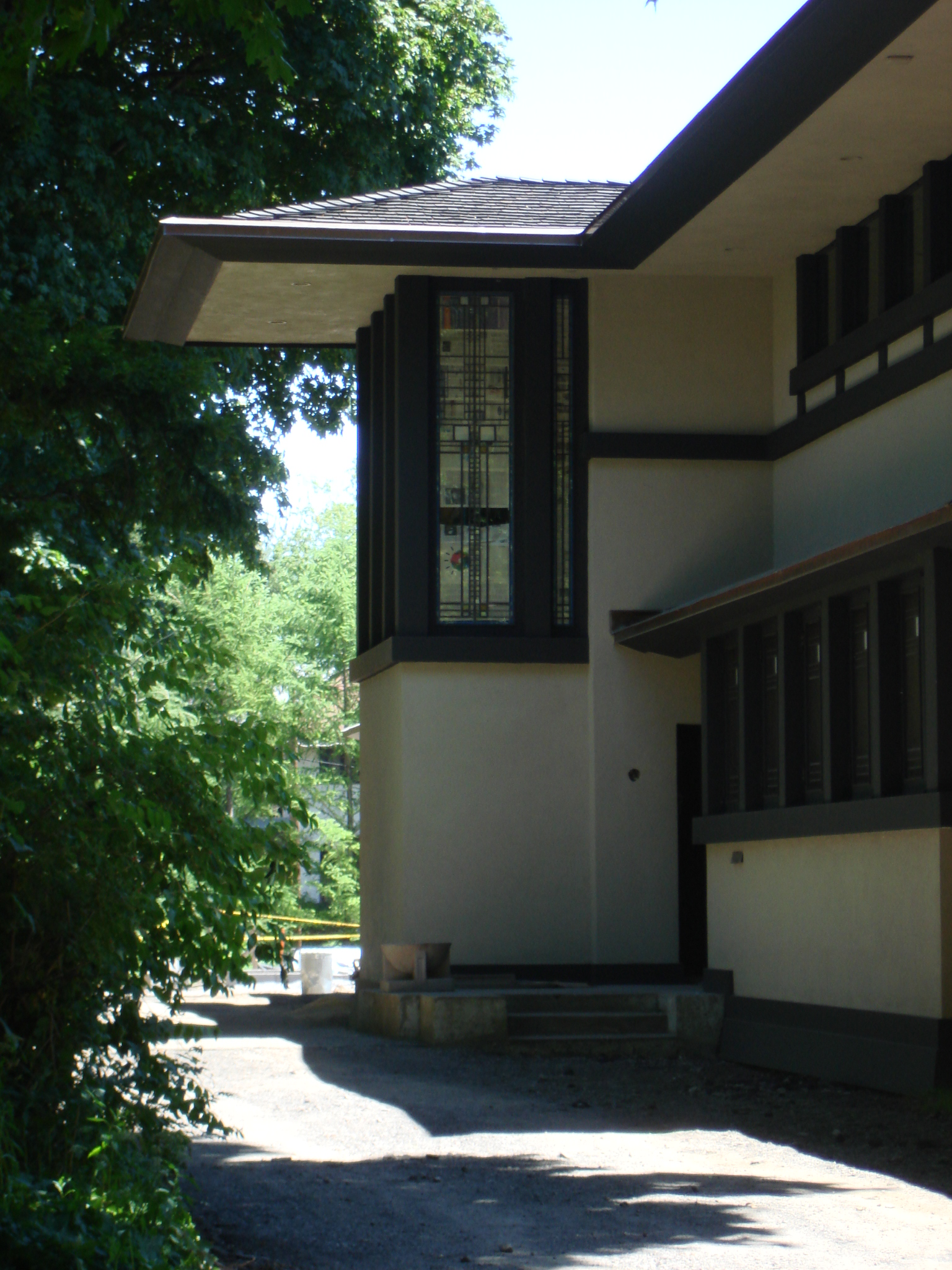
Detail of view from East Blvd., Summer 2011

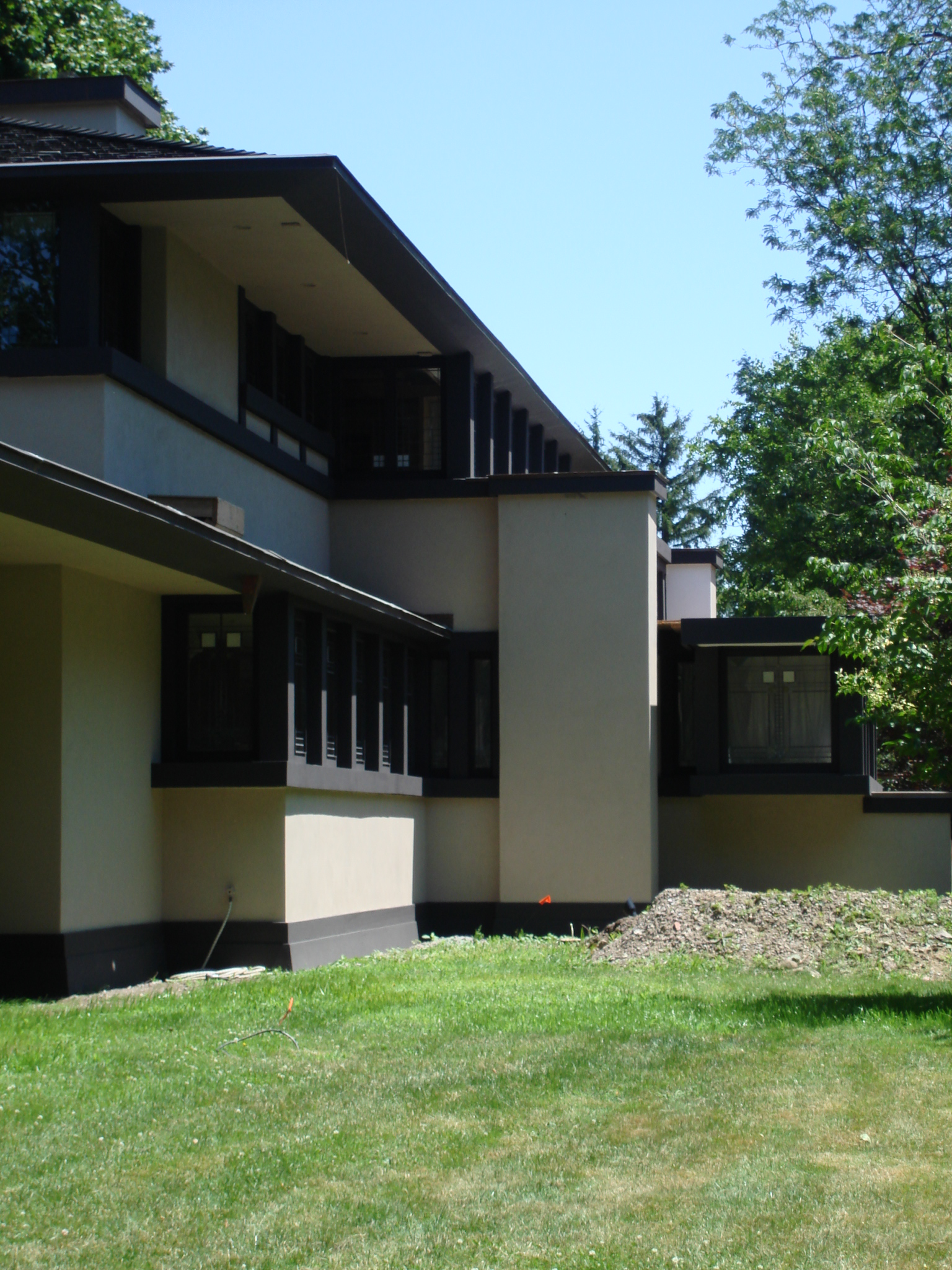
View from East Blvd., Summer 2011

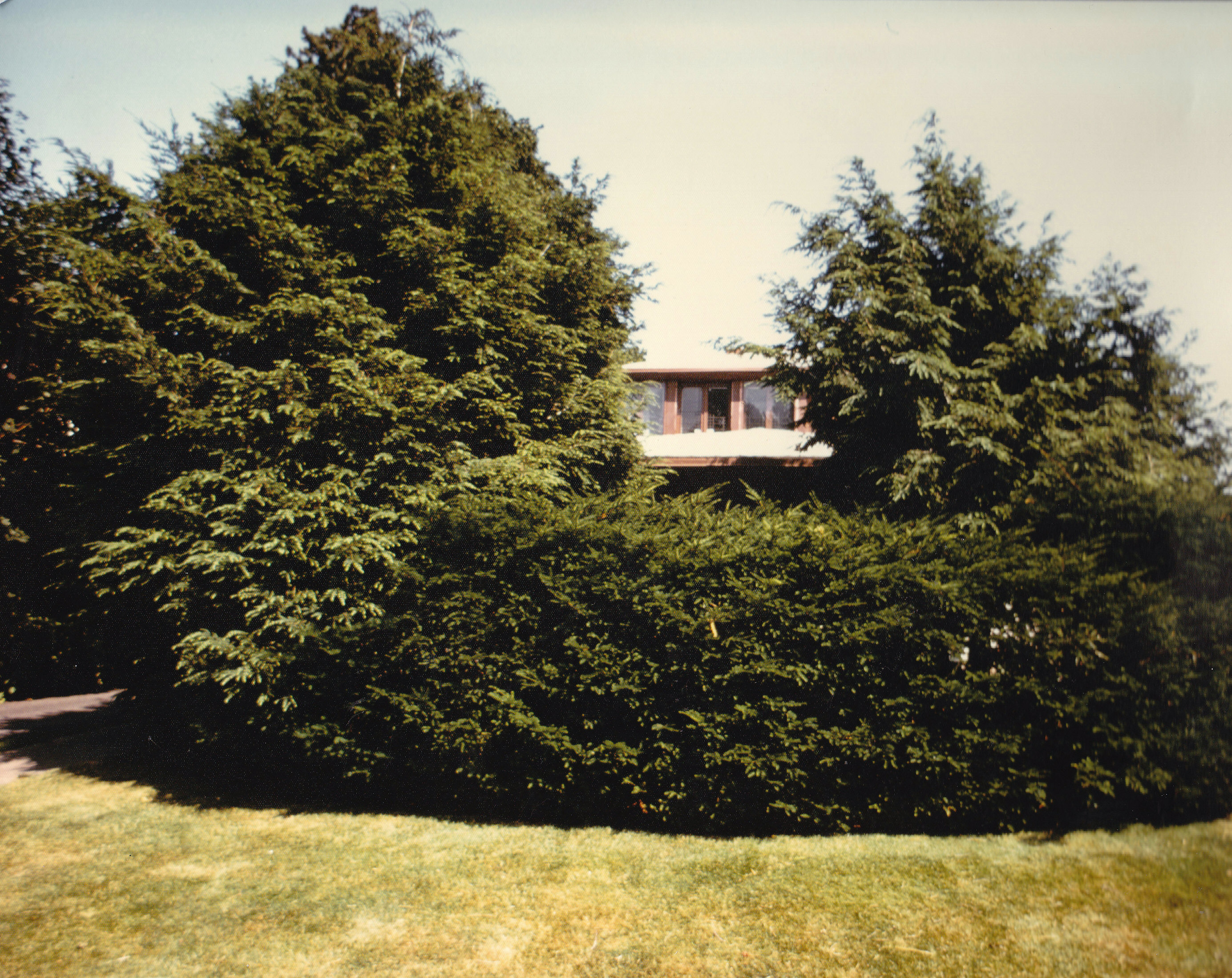
Boynton House 1973

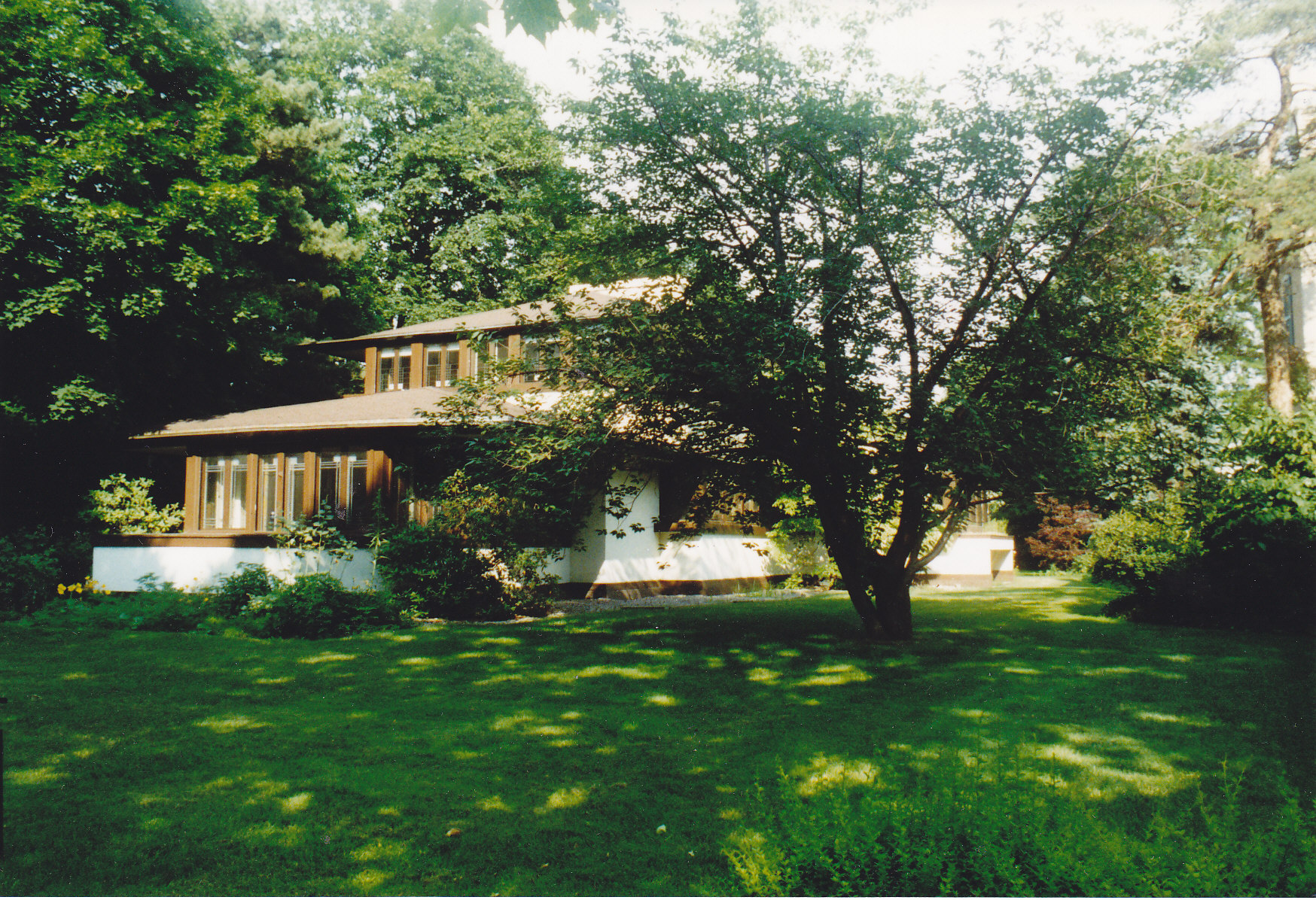
Boynton House 1980s

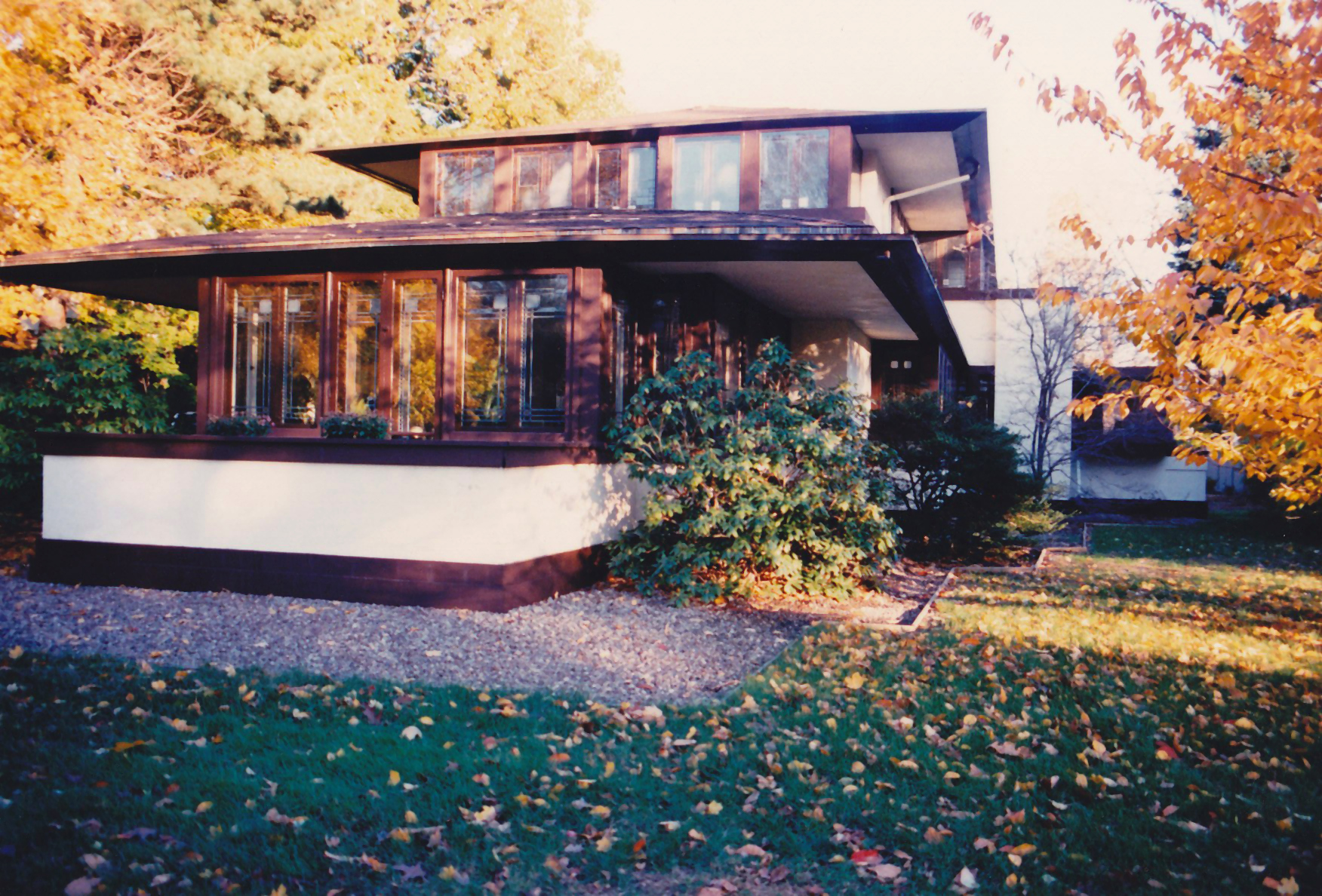
Boynton House 1991

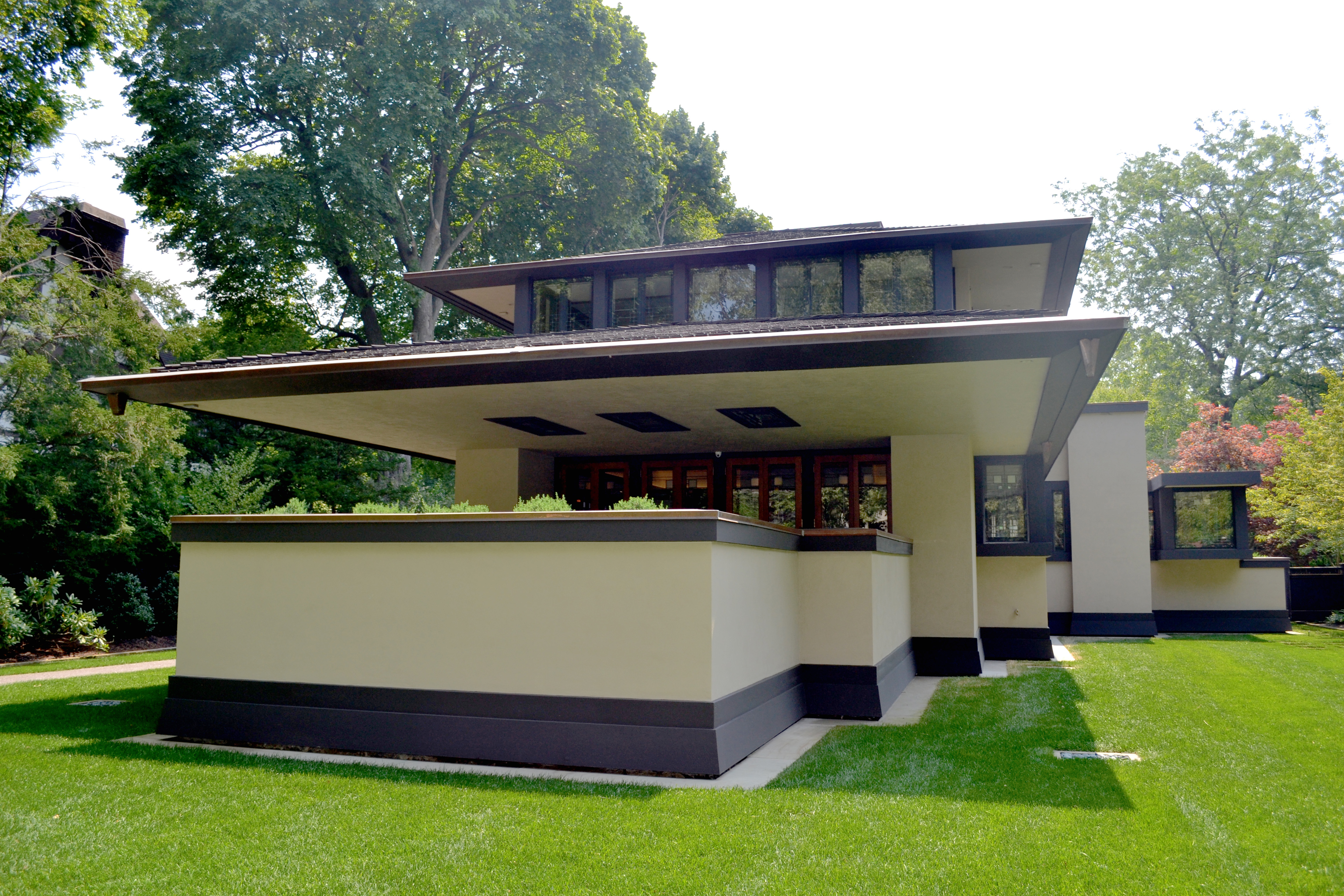
Boynton House Front Porch 2012

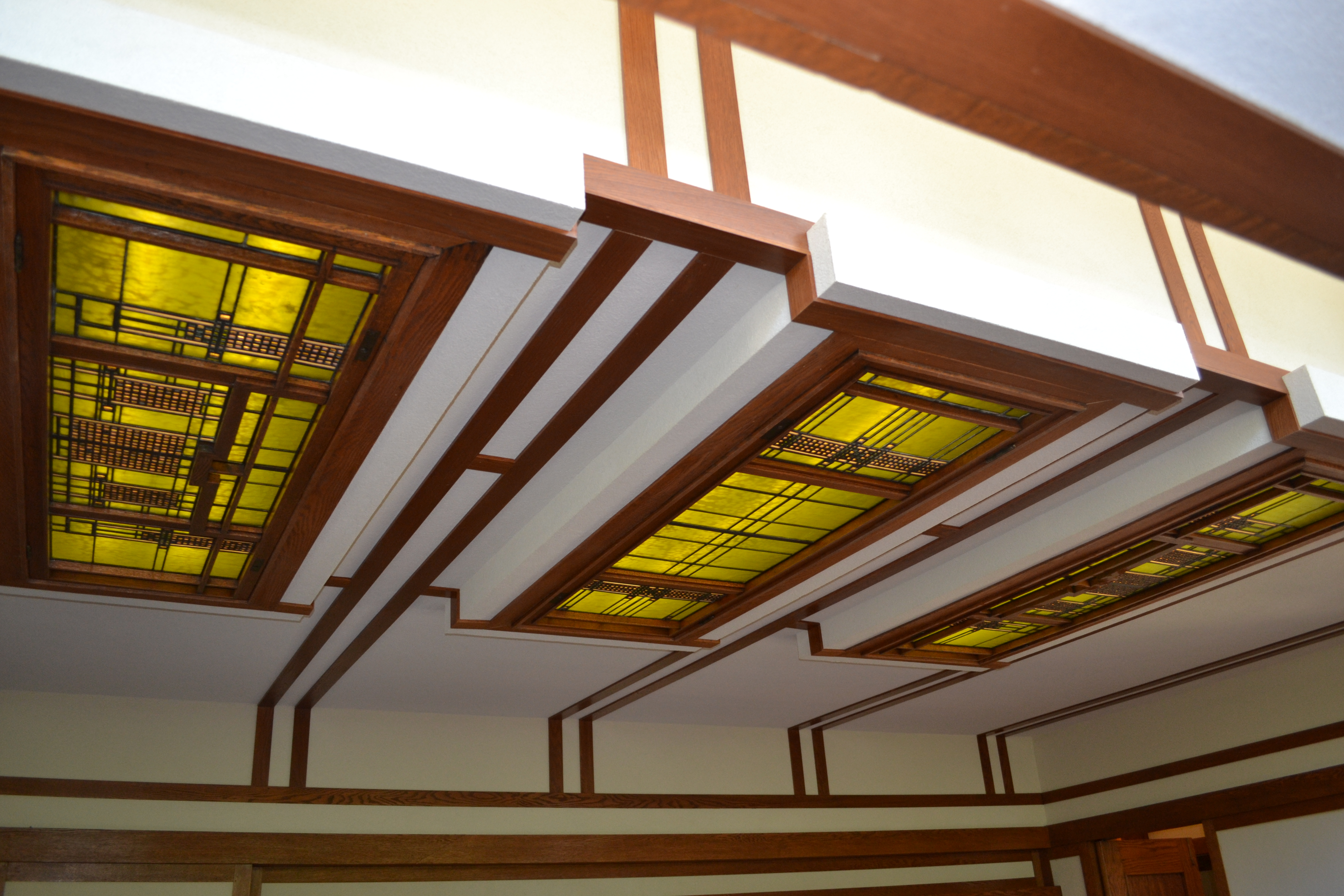
Boynton House ceiling 2012

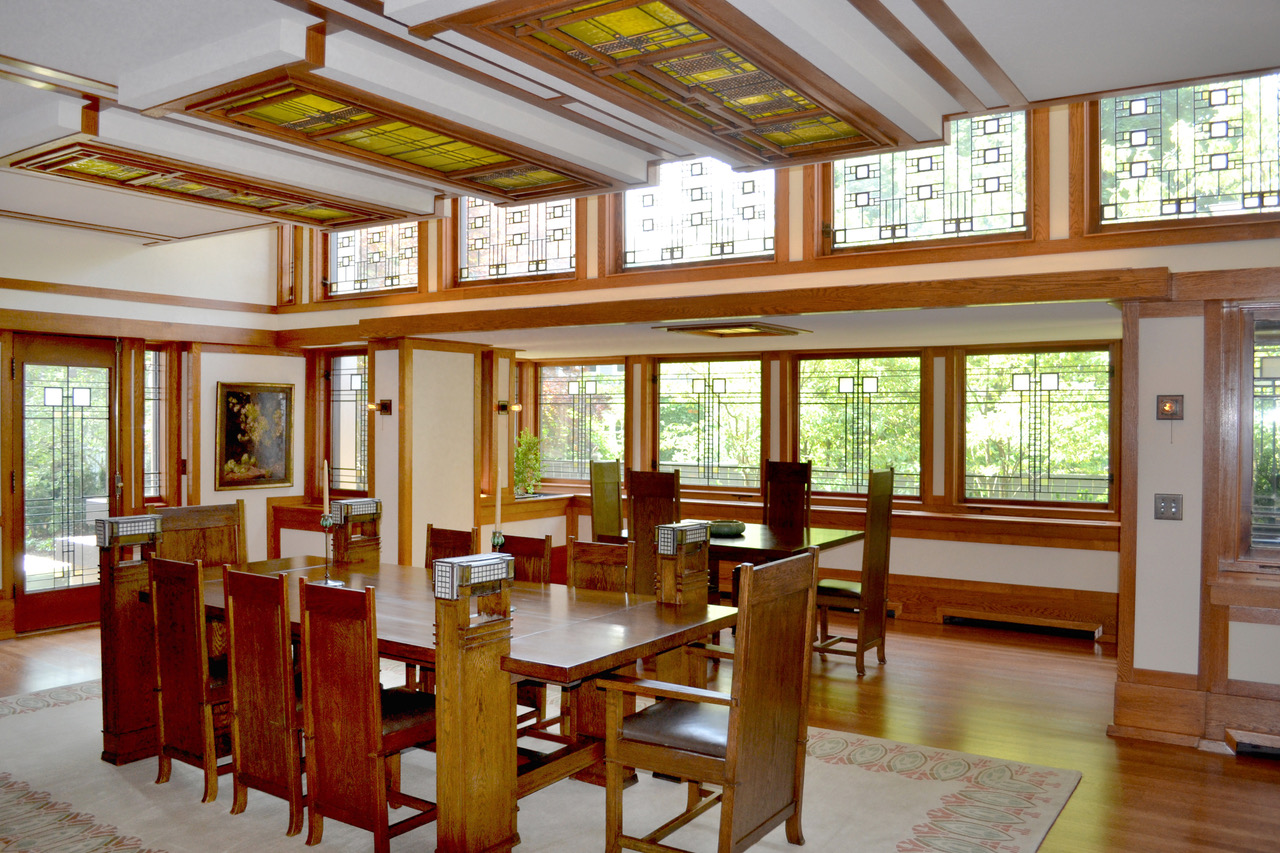
Boynton House Dining Room 2012 Facing Windows

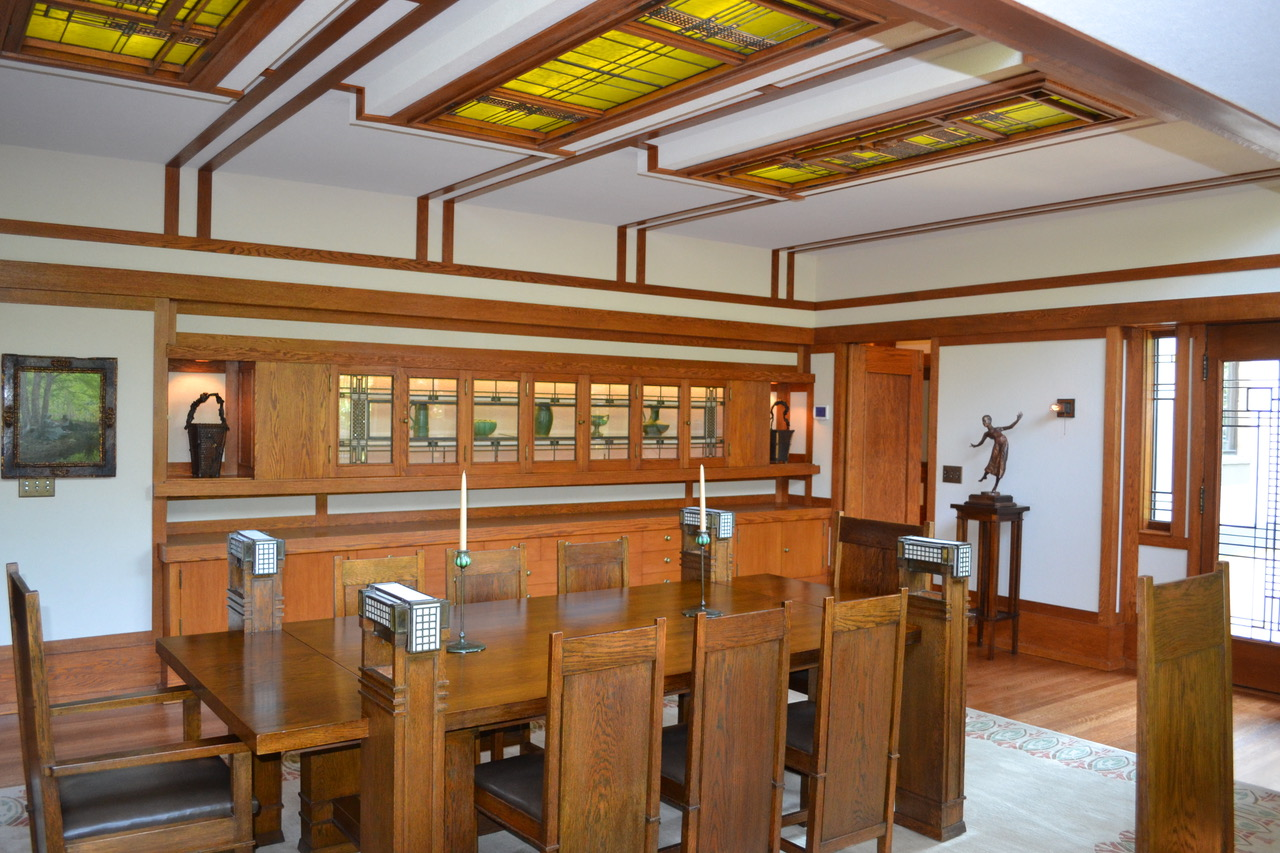
Boynton House Dining Room Facing Cabinets 2012

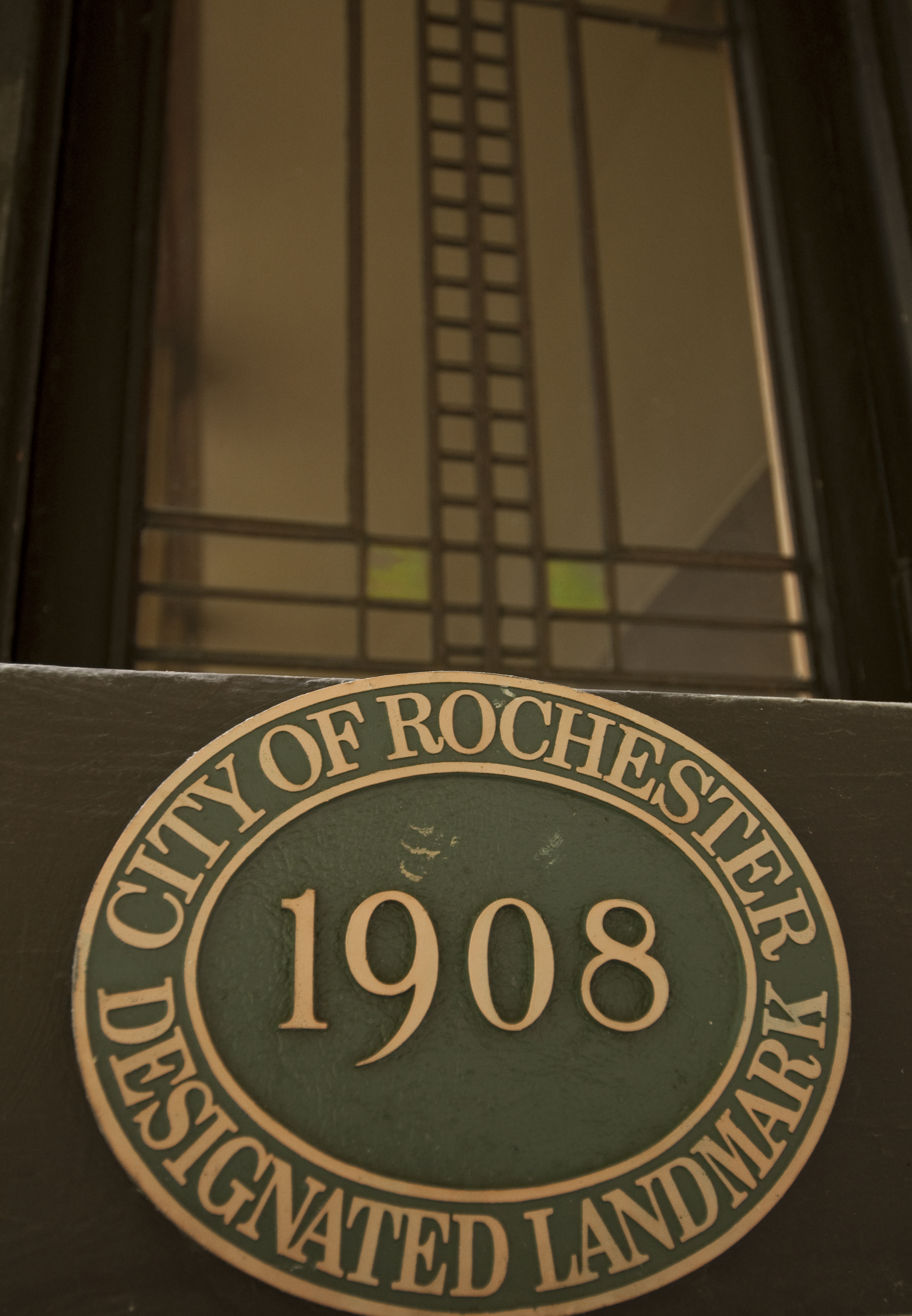
Boynton House Landmark Sign

== See also ==
- List of Frank Lloyd Wright works

== Bibliography ==
- Bixler, Kim (2012). Growing Up in a Frank Lloyd Wright House. Clue Publications. ISBN 978-0-9652426-1-5. OCLC 835633241.
- Pfeiffer, Bruce Brooks (1990). Frank Lloyd Wright Drawings: Masterworks from the Frank Lloyd Wright Archives. New York: Harry N. Abrams. ISBN 9780810917736.
- Sheridan, Jan Booth (2010). Frank Lloyd Wright in Buffalo and Western New York. Buffalo, N.Y.: Western New York Wares, Inc. ISBN 9781879201651.
- Storrer, William Allin (1993). The Frank Lloyd Wright Companion. Chicago: University of Chicago Press. p. 150. ISBN 978-0-226-77624-8. (S. 147)
- Wright, Frank Lloyd (1983). Drawings and plans of Frank Lloyd Wright: the early period (1893-1909) (English language reprint of Ausgeführte Bauten and Entwürfe von Frank Lloyd Wright, Ernst Wasmuth, Berlin, 1910 ed.). New York: Dover Publications. ISBN 9780486244570.
