= East Avenue Historic District =

Historic district in New York, United States

- U.S. National Register of Historic Places
- U.S. Historic district
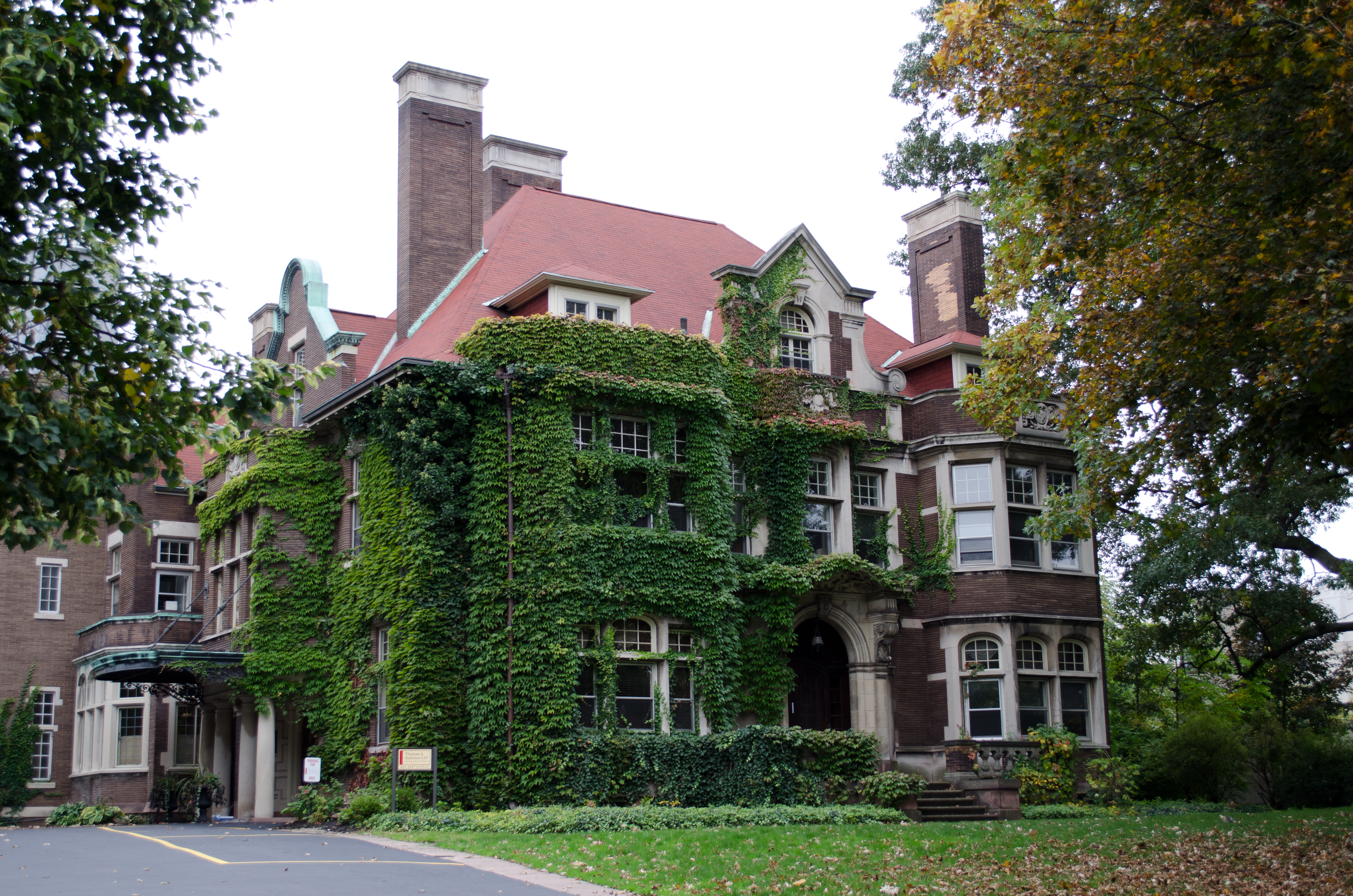
- The Strong-Todd House on East Avenue

- Location within New York Location within the United States
- Location: Irregular pattern along East Ave. from Probert St. to Alexander St., Rochester, New York
- Coordinates: 43°9′9″N 77°34′51″W
- Area: 362 acres (146 ha)
- Architect: Wright, Frank Lloyd; Et al.
- Architectural style: Greek Revival, Italianate, Queen Anne
- NRHP reference No.: 79001589
- Added to NRHP: April 17, 1979

East Avenue Historic District is a national historic district located at Rochester in Monroe County, New York. The district consists of a series of large 19th and early 20th century homes, houses of worship, meeting houses, and museums. It contains approximately 700 structures. Notable structures in the district include the Hiram W. Sibley House (1868), home of Hiram Sibley; Edward E. Boynton House (1909), Rochester's only work by Frank Lloyd Wright; the Culver House (1805–1816), moved to its present site in 1906; and the Strong-Todd House (1901), once occupied by Henry A. Strong.

It was listed on the National Register of Historic Places in 1979.

The George Eastman House is a National Historic Landmark located within the district.

== Gallery ==
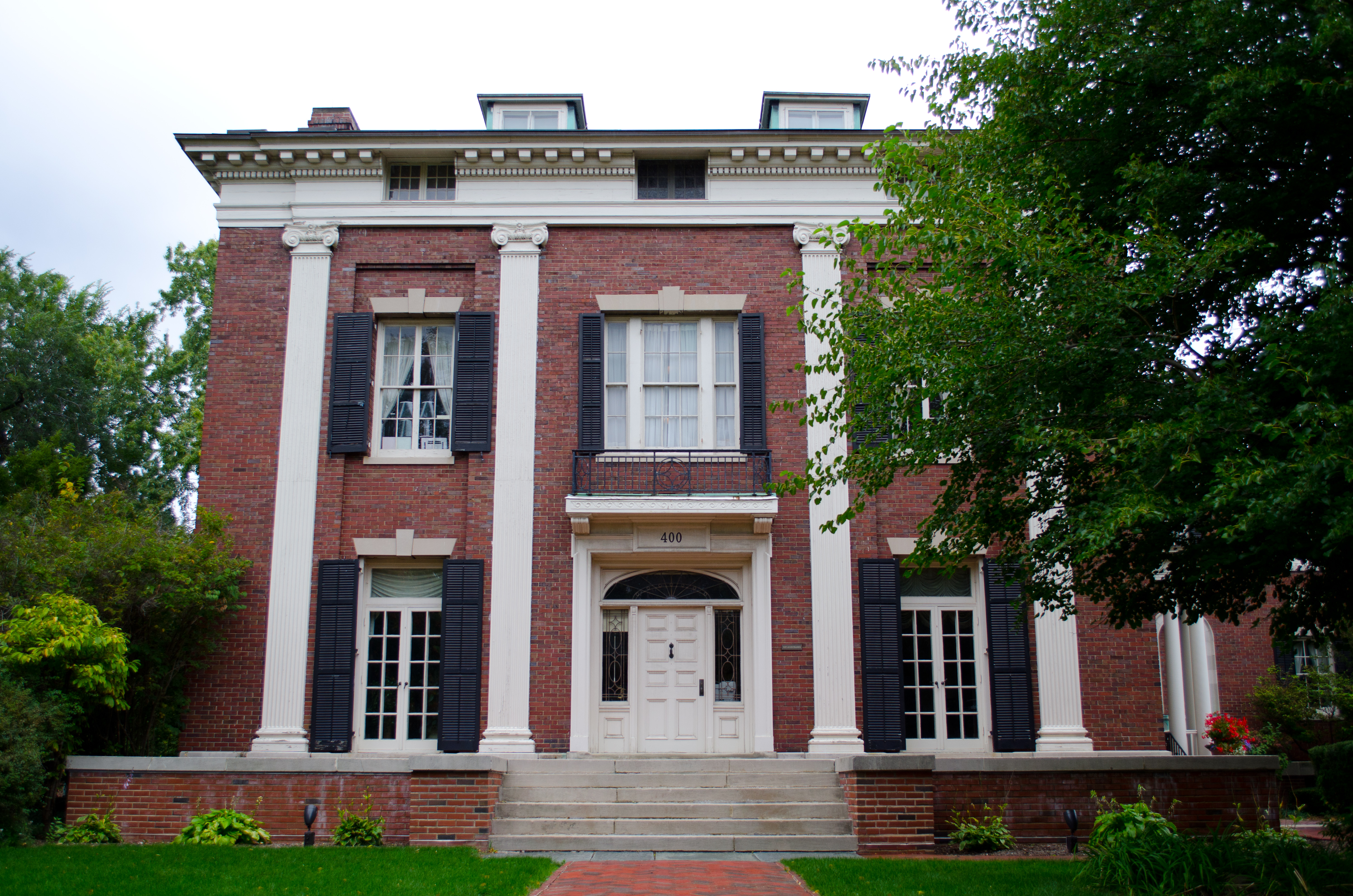
The Hiram Sibley House at 400 East Avenue

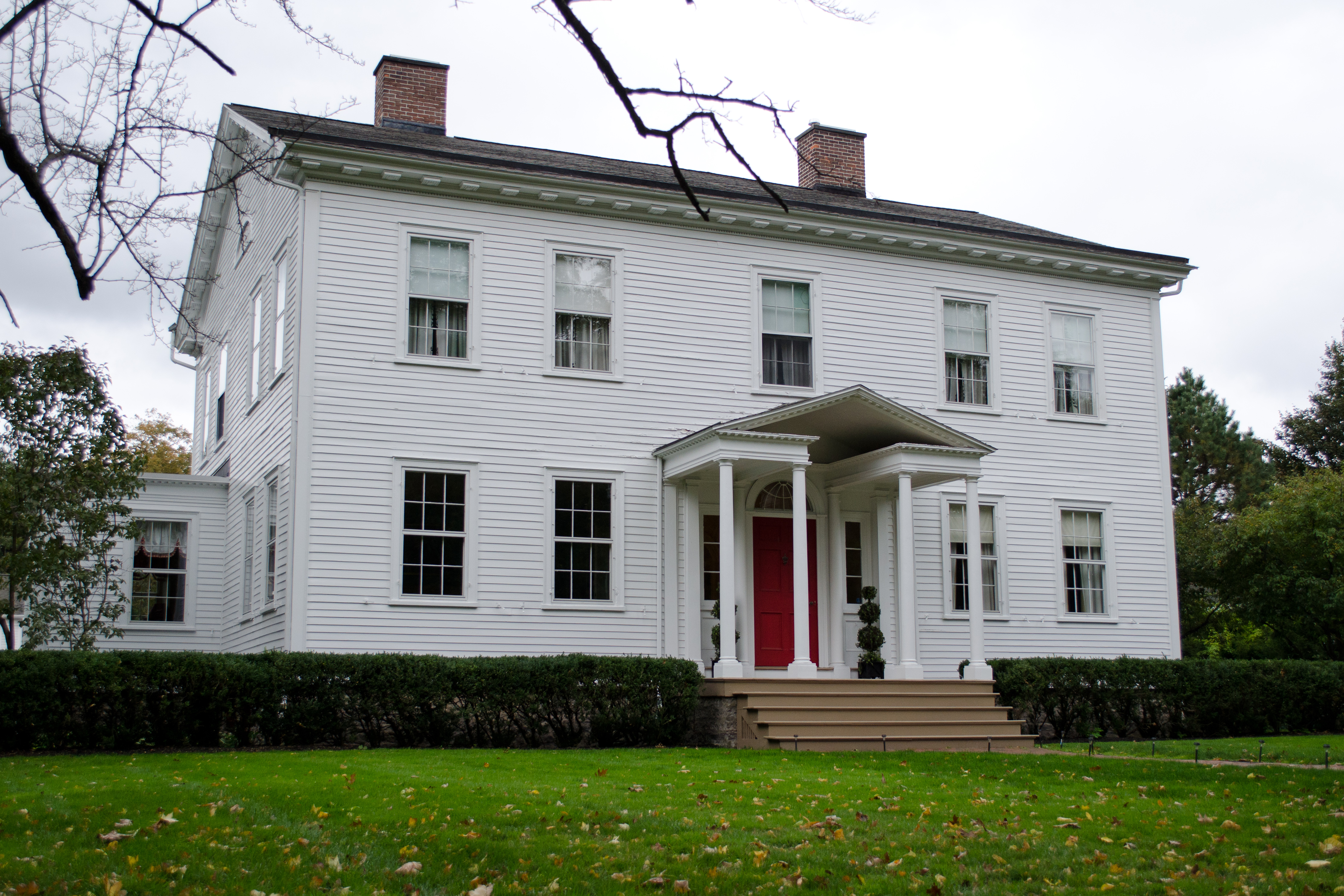
The Culver House at 70 East Boulevard

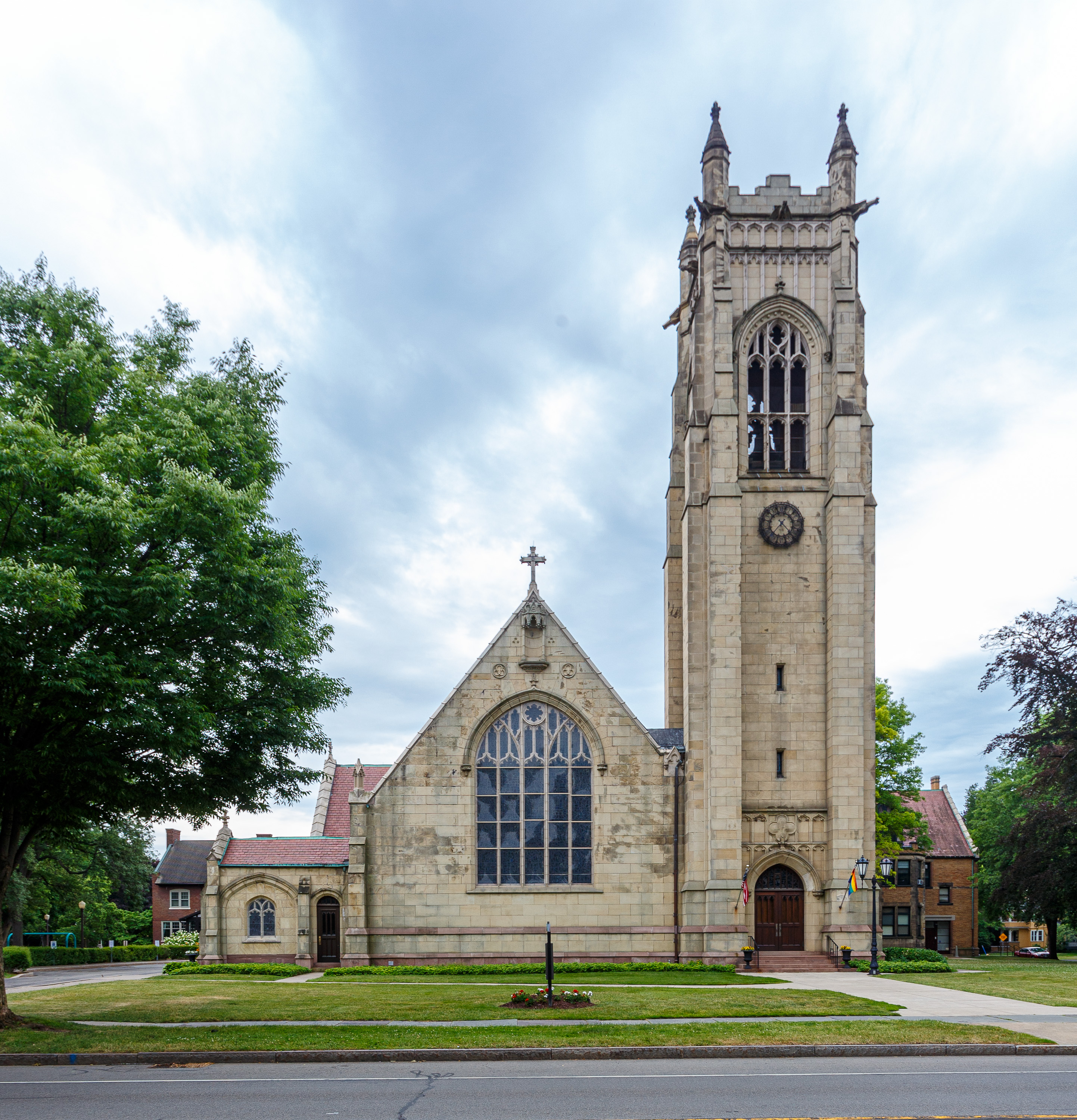
St. Paul's Episcopal Church, 25 Westminster Road
