= 1934 Illinois Senate election =

- November 6, 1934

27 out of 51 seats in the Illinois Senate 26 seats needed for a majority
| | Majority party | Minority party |
|---|---|---|
| Party | Democratic | Republican |
| Last election | 33 | 18 |
| Seats after | 35 | 16 |
| Seat change | ▲2 | ▼2 |
| Popular vote | 972,045 | 697,772 |
| Percentage | 58.13% | 41.73% |
Presidents pro tempore before election
Richey V. Graham
Democratic
Elected Presidents pro tempore
Richey V. Graham
Democratic

The 1934 Illinois Senate election was held on November 6, 1934, to determine which party would control the Illinois Senate for the following two years in the 59th Illinois General Assembly. The 26 odd-numbered seats out of the 51 seats in the Illinois Senate were up for election alongside a special election to fill the vacancy left in District 40 following the death of incumbent democratic state senator Clifford J. Vogelsang on May 8, 1933. The primary was held on April 10, 1934. Prior to the election, 33 seats were held by Democrats and 18 seats were held by Republicans. The general election saw Democrats expanding their majority in the State Senate by 2 seats.

== Retirements ==
=== Democrats ===
1. District 29: Edward P. O'Grady retired.
2. District 49: E. P. Kline retired.

=== Republicans ===
1. District 7: Arthur A. Huebsch retired.
2. District 33: Martin R. Carlson retired.
3. District 35: Harry G. Wright retired.
4. District 51: Charles H. Thompson retired.

== Incumbents defeated ==
=== In primary ===
==== Democrats ====
1. District 23: William F. Gillmeister lost renomination to Thomas E. Keane.

==== Republicans ====
1. District 3: Adelbert H. Roberts lost renomination to William E. King.

=== In general ===
==== Republicans ====
1. District 5: Roy C. Woods lost re-election to Thomas Vernor Smith.

== Closest races ==
Seats where the margin of victory was under 10%:

1. District 7, 0.12%
2. District 3, 0.90%
3. District 43, 0.98%
4. District 51, 1.62%
5. District 41, 1.76%
6. District 35, 3.06%
7. District 45, 4.81%
8. District 5, 5.68% (gain)
9. District 33, 6.00% (gain)

== Results ==
=== District 1 ===
District 1 election, 1934
| Party | Candidate | Votes | % |
|---|---|---|---|
| Republican | Daniel Serritella (incumbent) | 5,860 | 100.0% |
| Total votes | | 5,860 | 100.0% |
| Republican hold | | | |

=== District 3 ===
District 3 election, 1934
| Party | Candidate | Votes | % |
|---|---|---|---|
| Republican | William E. King | 17,384 | 50.55% |
| Democratic | Bryant A. Hammond | 17,004 | 49.45% |
| Total votes | | 34,388 | 100.0% |
| Republican hold | | | |

=== District 5 ===
District 5 election, 1934
| Party | Candidate | Votes | % |
|---|---|---|---|
| Democratic | Thomas Vernor Smith | 41,799 | 52.84% |
| Republican | Roy C. Woods (incumbent) | 37,300 | 47.16% |
| Total votes | | 79,099 | 100.0% |
| Democratic gain from Republican | | | |

=== District 7 ===
District 7 election, 1934 (Note: Despite his victory, Arthur J. Bidwill was ousted four and one half months after the election by the Democrat-controlled Senate on a vote of 28 to 14 citing voting irregularities. Charles F. Baumrucker would be named as his replacement.)
| Party | Candidate | Votes | % |
|---|---|---|---|
| Republican | Arthur J. Bidwill | 58,479 | 50.06% |
| Democratic | Charles F. Baumrucker | 58,330 | 49.94% |
| Total votes | | 116,809 | 100.0% |
| Republican hold | | | |

=== District 9 ===
District 9 election, 1934
| Party | Candidate | Votes | % |
|---|---|---|---|
| Democratic | Patrick J. Carroll (incumbent) | 30,340 | 80.23% |
| Republican | William M. Zipperman | 7,476 | 19.77% |
| Total votes | | 37,816 | 100.0% |
| Democratic hold | | | |

=== District 11 ===
District 11 election, 1934
| Party | Candidate | Votes | % |
|---|---|---|---|
| Democratic | John M. Lee (incumbent) | 83,987 | 65.40% |
| Republican | Lester W. Porter | 44,440 | 34.60% |
| Total votes | | 128,427 | 100.0% |
| Democratic hold | | | |

=== District 13 ===
District 13 election, 1934
| Party | Candidate | Votes | % |
|---|---|---|---|
| Democratic | Francis J. Loughran (incumbent) | 83,987 | 55.59% |
| Republican | Grenville Beardsley | 65,811 | 43.56% |
| Independent | Joseph R. Burda | 900 | 0.60% |
| Prohibition | Harmon W. Reed | 384 | 0.25% |
| Total votes | | 151,082 | 100.0% |
| Democratic hold | | | |

=== District 15 ===
District 15 election, 1934
| Party | Candidate | Votes | % |
|---|---|---|---|
| Democratic | Peter P. Kielminski (incumbent) | 12,058 | 75.59% |
| Republican | Felix Kaski | 3,894 | 24.41% |
| Total votes | | 15,952 | 100.0% |
| Democratic hold | | | |

=== District 17 ===
District 17 election, 1934
| Party | Candidate | Votes | % |
|---|---|---|---|
| Republican | James B. Leonardo (incumbent) | 5,576 | 100.0% |
| Total votes | | 5,576 | 100.0% |
| Republican hold | | | |

=== District 19 ===
District 19 election, 1934
| Party | Candidate | Votes | % |
|---|---|---|---|
| Democratic | Richey V. Graham (incumbent) | 106,311 | 77.34% |
| Republican | Edward G. Konvalinka | 30,533 | 22.21% |
| Independent | Alonzo J. Boulanger | 615 | 0.45% |
| Total votes | | 137,459 | 100.0% |
| Democratic hold | | | |

=== District 21 ===
District 21 election, 1934
| Party | Candidate | Votes | % |
|---|---|---|---|
| Democratic | George M. Maypole (incumbent) | 38,540 | 68.41% |
| Republican | Joseph B. Caracci | 17,796 | 31.59% |
| Total votes | | 56,336 | 100.0% |
| Democratic hold | | | |

=== District 23 ===
District 23 election, 1934
| Party | Candidate | Votes | % |
|---|---|---|---|
| Democratic | Thomas E. Keane | 48,024 | 59.62% |
| Republican | William G. Thon | 32,524 | 40.38% |
| Total votes | | 80,548 | 100.0% |
| Democratic hold | | | |

=== District 25 ===
District 25 election, 1934
| Party | Candidate | Votes | % |
|---|---|---|---|
| Democratic | Frank J. Huckin Jr. (incumbent) | 115,873 | 62.75% |
| Republican | Oscar C. Johnson | 68,775 | 37.25% |
| Total votes | | 184,648 | 100.0% |
| Democratic hold | | | |

=== District 27 ===
District 27 election, 1934
| Party | Candidate | Votes | % |
|---|---|---|---|
| Democratic | John Broderick (incumbent) | 13,520 | 81.32% |
| Republican | George A. Gillmeister | 3,106 | 18.68% |
| Total votes | | 16,626 | 100.0% |
| Democratic hold | | | |

=== District 29 ===
District 29 election, 1934
| Party | Candidate | Votes | % |
|---|---|---|---|
| Democratic | William J. Connors | 10,445 | 61.10% |
| Republican | Robert M. Woodward | 6,649 | 38.90% |
| Total votes | | 17,094 | 100.0% |
| Democratic hold | | | |

=== District 31 ===
District 31 election, 1934
| Party | Candidate | Votes | % |
|---|---|---|---|
| Democratic | Harold G. Ward (incumbent) | 45,634 | 57.77% |
| Republican | Homer A. Dodge | 33,362 | 42.23% |
| Total votes | | 78,996 | 100.0% |
| Democratic hold | | | |

=== District 33 ===
District 33 election, 1934
| Party | Candidate | Votes | % |
|---|---|---|---|
| Democratic | Robert M. Harper | 25,347 | 53.00% |
| Republican | William B. Schroder | 22,475 | 47.00% |
| Total votes | | 47,822 | 100.0% |
| Democratic gain from Republican | | | |

=== District 35 ===
District 35 election, 1934
| Party | Candidate | Votes | % |
|---|---|---|---|
| Republican | George C. Dixon | 20,739 | 51.53% |
| Democratic | Henry J. White | 19,509 | 48.47% |
| Total votes | | 40,248 | 100.0% |
| Republican hold | | | |

=== District 37 ===
District 37 election, 1934
| Party | Candidate | Votes | % |
|---|---|---|---|
| Republican | Thomas P. Gunning (incumbent) | 24,699 | 63.43% |
| Democratic | James H. Andrews | 14,241 | 36.57% |
| Total votes | | 38,940 | 100.0% |
| Republican hold | | | |

=== District 39 ===
District 39 election, 1934
| Party | Candidate | Votes | % |
|---|---|---|---|
| Republican | Noah M. Mason (incumbent) | 23,310 | 57.65% |
| Democratic | James R. Johnson | 17,123 | 42.35% |
| Total votes | | 40,433 | 100.0% |
| Republican hold | | | |

=== District 40 (Special) ===
District 40 special election, 1934
| Party | Candidate | Votes | % |
|---|---|---|---|
| Democratic | John Wesley Fribley | 24,334 | 55.78% |
| Republican | J. W. Spresser | 19,290 | 44.22% |
| Total votes | | 43,624 | 100.0% |
| Democratic hold | | | |

=== District 41 ===
District 41 election, 1934
| Party | Candidate | Votes | % |
|---|---|---|---|
| Republican | Richard J. Barr (incumbent) | 39,957 | 50.88% |
| Democratic | John V. McCarthy | 38,567 | 49.12% |
| Total votes | | 78,524 | 100.0% |
| Republican hold | | | |

=== District 43 ===
District 43 election, 1934
| Party | Candidate | Votes | % |
|---|---|---|---|
| Republican | Clinton L. Ewing (incumbent) | 20,153 | 50.49% |
| Democratic | M. P. Rice | 19,760 | 49.51% |
| Total votes | | 39,913 | 100.0% |
| Republican hold | | | |

=== District 45 ===
District 45 election, 1934
| Party | Candidate | Votes | % |
|---|---|---|---|
| Republican | Earle Benjamin Searcy (incumbent) | 33,441 | 52.06% |
| Democratic | S. I. Gresham | 30,352 | 47.25% |
| Socialist | Louis Aidich | 442 | 0.69% |
| Total votes | | 64,235 | 100.0% |
| Republican hold | | | |

=== District 47 ===
District 47 election, 1934
| Party | Candidate | Votes | % |
|---|---|---|---|
| Democratic | James O. Monroe (incumbent) | 27,883 | 62.06% |
| Republican | Alvin C. Bohm | 17,045 | 37.94% |
| Total votes | | 44,928 | 100.0% |
| Democratic hold | | | |

=== District 49 ===
District 49 election, 1934
| Party | Candidate | Votes | % |
|---|---|---|---|
| Democratic | Louis J. Menges | 31,249 | 61.84% |
| Republican | W. R. Weber | 19,280 | 38.16% |
| Total votes | | 50,529 | 100.0% |
| Democratic hold | | | |

=== District 51 ===
District 51 election, 1934
| Party | Candidate | Votes | % |
|---|---|---|---|
| Republican | Oral P. Tuttle | 18,418 | 50.81% |
| Democratic | Kenneth L. Jones | 17,828 | 49.19% |
| Total votes | | 36,246 | 100.0% |
| Republican hold | | | |
