= River Forest Historic District =

Historic district in Illinois, United States

- U.S. National Register of Historic Places
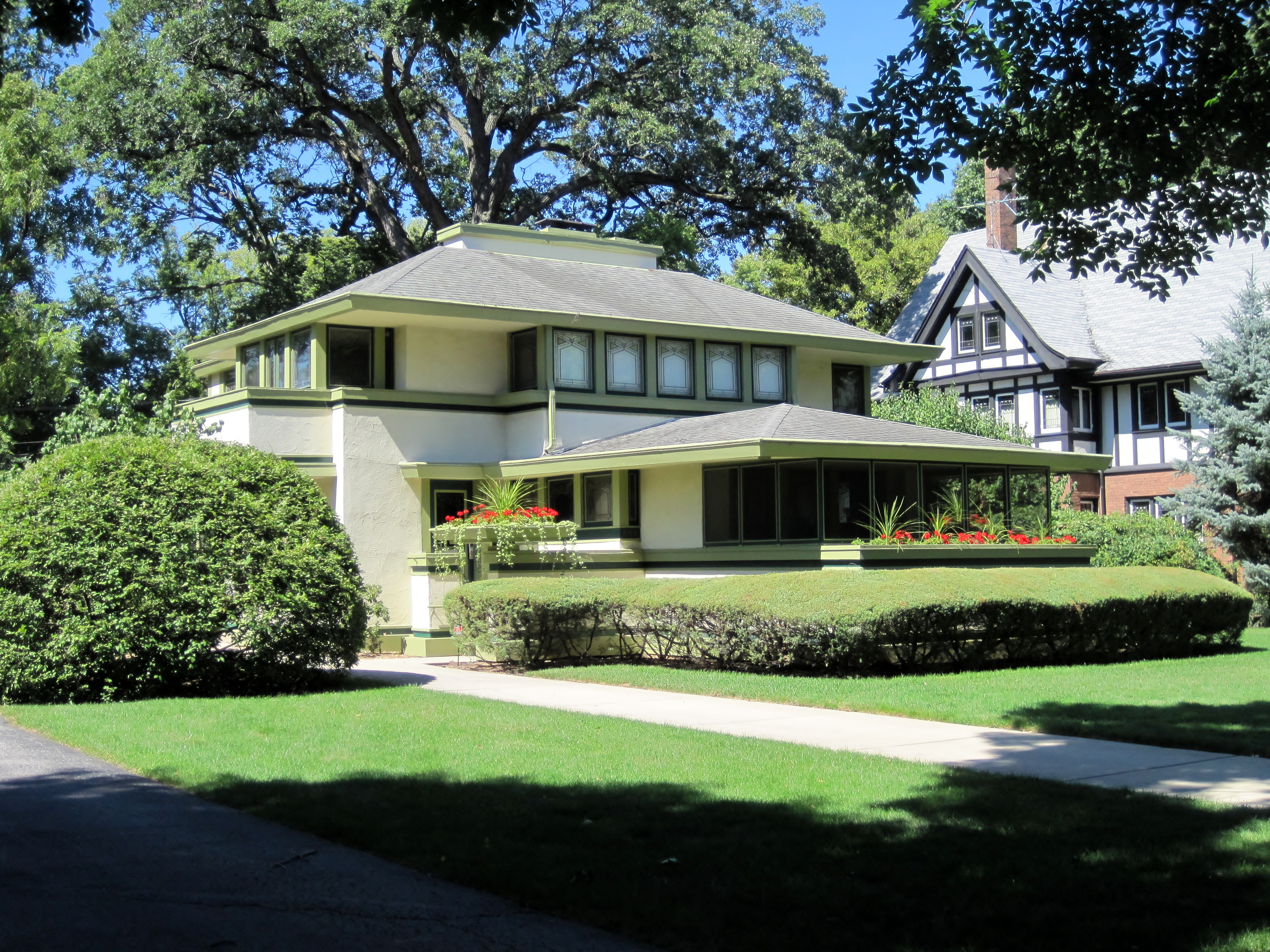
- J. Kibben Ingalls House

- Location within Chicago metropolitan area Location within Illinois Location within the United States
- Location: Between Harlem Ave. and Des Plaines River with 2 extensions N of Chicago Ave. and 2 extensions S of Lake St., River Forest, Illinois
- Coordinates: 41°53′31″N 87°49′09″W
- Area: 356 acres (144 ha)
- Architectural style: Prairie School, Italianate, Classical Revival
- NRHP reference No.: 77000483
- Added to NRHP: August 26, 1977

The River Forest Historic District is a national historic district encompassing much of the village of River Forest, Illinois. The district includes 830 buildings, most of which are houses as the village is almost entirely residential. The oldest structure in the district is the 1831 Bickerdike and Noble sawmill, the first permanent structure built by European settlers in River Forest; residential development began in the mid-nineteenth century and continued through the 1930s. The district has a considerable number of Prairie School houses, including a rare example of an entire block of small-scale Prairie homes. Several works by Frank Lloyd Wright are within the district, including the Winslow House and stable, the Chauncey L. Williams Residence, the Isabel Roberts House, the J. Kibben Ingalls House, and the River Forest Tennis Club. The Prairie School architects William Eugene Drummond, Tallmadge and Watson, Purcell & Elmslie, John S. Van Bergen, and Spencer & Powers designed homes in the district as well. Examples of other popular architectural styles, most prominently Italianate and Classical Revival, can also be found in the district.

The district was added to the National Register of Historic Places on August 26, 1977.
