= Senator Bidwell =

Senator Bidwell may refer to:

- Barnabas Bidwell (1763–1833), Massachusetts State Senate
- Everett Bidwell (1899–1991), Wisconsin State Senate
- John Bidwell (1819–1900), California State Senate

== See also ==
- Arthur J. Bidwill (1903–1985), Illinois State Senate
