= Senator Carroll =

Senator Carroll may refer to:

== Members of the United States Senate ==
- John A. Carroll (1901–1983), U.S. Senator from Colorado from 1957 to 1963
- Charles Carroll of Carrollton (1737–1832), U.S. Senator from Maryland from 1789 to 1792

== United States state senate members ==
- Beryl F. Carroll (1860–1939), Iowa State Senate
- Charles H. Carroll (1794–1865), New York State Senate
- Charles Carroll (barrister) (1723–1783), Maryland State Senate
- Daniel J. Carroll (1874–1927), New York State Senate
- Daniel Carroll (1730–1796), Maryland State Senate
- Danny Carroll (Kentucky politician) (born 1963), Kentucky State Senate
- Edward C. Carroll (1893–1969), Massachusetts State Senate
- Frank Carroll (Arizona politician) (fl. 2010s–2020s), Arizona State Senate
- Howard W. Carroll (1942–2021), Illinois State Senate
- James H. Carroll (c. 1876–1950), Wisconsin State Senate
- John Lee Carroll (1830–1911), Maryland State Senate
- John Carroll (Hawaii politician) (1929–2021), Hawaii State Senate
- Julian Carroll (1931–2023), Kentucky State Senate
- Morgan Carroll (born 1971), Colorado State Senate
- Patrick J. Carroll (Illinois politician) (1873–1938), Illinois State Senate
- William D. Carroll (1880–1955), Wisconsin State Senate

== See also ==
- Senator Carrell (disambiguation)
