= Francis Loughran =

Francis Loughran may refer to:

- Frank Loughran, Belfast-born footballer in Australia
- Francis J. Loughran, member of the Illinois House of Representatives
