= Isabel Roberts House =

Historic house in Illinois, United States

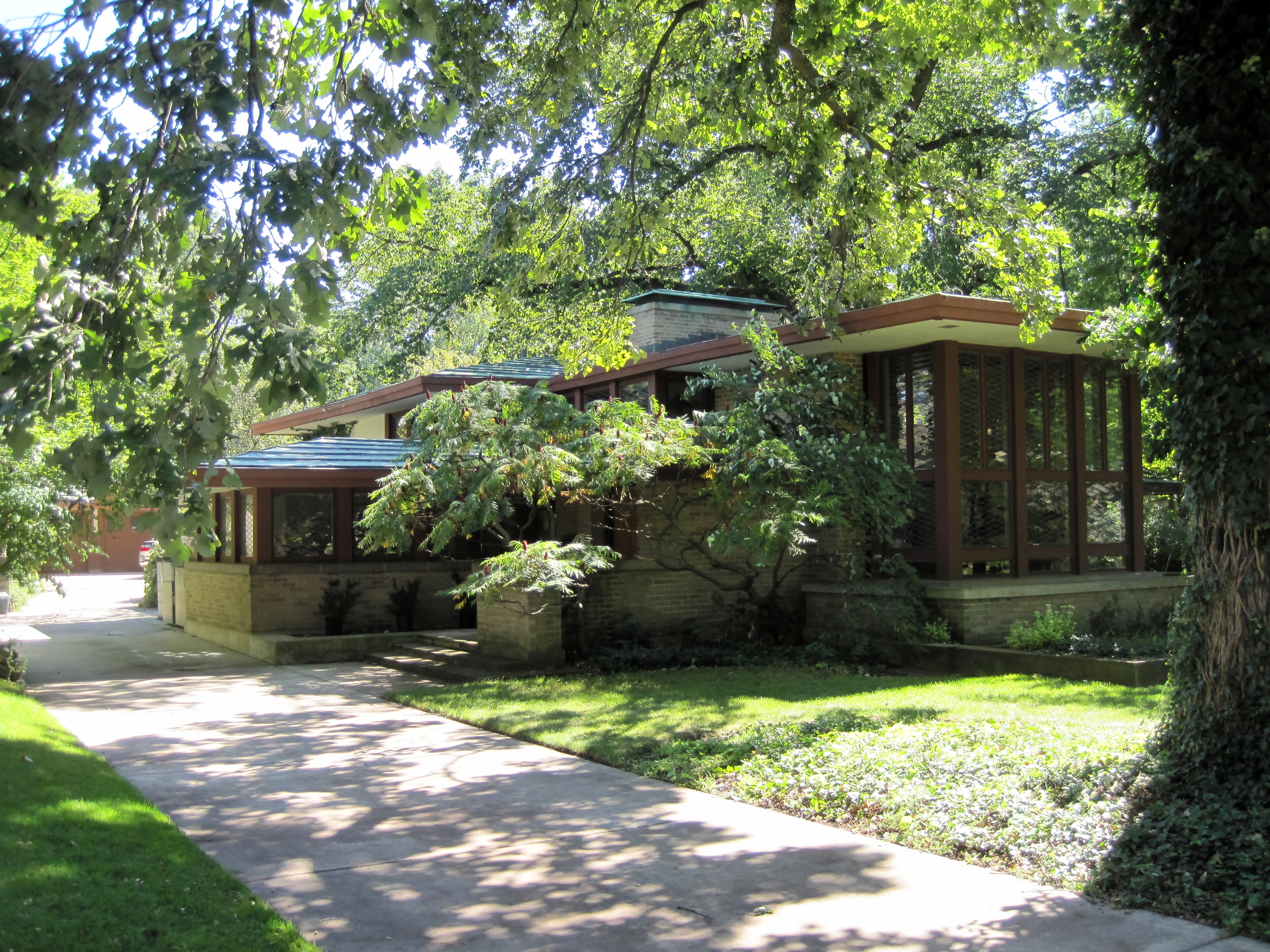

- Location within Illinois

General information
- Type: House
- Architectural style: Prairie School
- Location: River Forest, Illinois
- Coordinates: 41.890418°N 87.827065°W
- Construction started: 1908

Design and construction
- Architect: Frank Lloyd Wright

Isabel Roberts House is a 1908 Prairie Style house by architect Frank Lloyd Wright, located at 603 Edgewood Place in River Forest, Illinois It was built for Isabel Roberts and her widowed mother, Mary Roberts.

Scholars suggest that the house was originally designed for Joshua Melson, the co-developer of Rock Crest-Rock Glen, in Mason City, Iowa. On that site was built one of a collection of homes designed by Wright's associate, Walter Burley Griffin.

Over time, the house went through at least two renovations. The first was a renovation by Prairie School architect William Drummond in 1922. In 1958, Frank Lloyd Wright undertook a second remodeling of the house, which brought the design forward so that as it stands, it is a blending of Wright's Prairie Style and his later Usonian architecture. The Isabel Roberts House is privately owned. It is a contributing property to the River Forest Historic District.

== Design ==
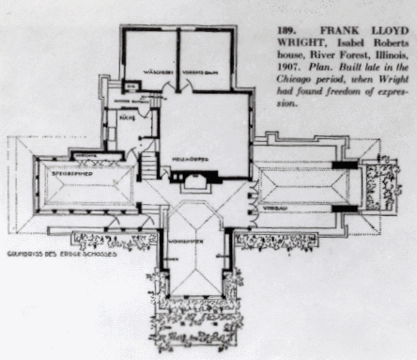

The Isabel Roberts house is sometimes credited as being the first split-level house. It also has features typical of Wright's mature Prairie style, including broad overhanging eaves, low hip roofs, continuous bands of windows which he called “light screens”, an emphatic water table, cruciform plan, large fireplace surrounded by Roman brick, built-in bookcases, stained woodwork, a tree growing through the roof, elimination of basement and attic space, and an overall emphasis on the horizontal line. Wright's Vosburgh House is similar in conception to the Isabel Roberts house.

The living room boasts groupings of windows on three of the four main walls, some 1½ stories high, and some clerestory; this provides a gracious feeling of light and airiness. Among the Isabel Roberts House's most appealing features is the balcony overlooking the tall living room, a design element Wright used here and elsewhere to create a sense of spaciousness in a small house.

== The Clients: Isabel Roberts and Mary Roberts ==
Isabel Roberts (1871–1955) has been described by Wright scholars as Frank Lloyd Wright's secretary, bookkeeper or office manager. While Isabel fulfilled these functions, she also took an active role in the lively and creative design atmosphere of his Studio in Oak Park. She produced original designs for the leaded glass windows in the Prairie houses and took part in the intramural design competitions that helped ripen the Prairie architecture described by Wright associate Barry Byrne.

As Wright's son John Lloyd Wright says, “William Drummond, Francis Barry Byrne, Walter Burley Griffin, Albert McArthur (Albert Chase McArthur), Marion Mahony, Isabel Roberts and George Willis were the draftsmen. Five men, two women. They wore flowing ties, and smocks suitable to the realm. The men wore their hair like Papa, all except Albert, he didn’t have enough hair. They worshiped Papa! Papa liked them! I know that each one of them was then making valuable contributions to the pioneering of the modern American architecture for which my father gets the full glory, headaches and recognition today!”

Mary Roberts (1836–1920) was born in Prince Edward Island. She married James H. Roberts in 1867. The family settled in South Bend, Indiana, where Mary lived until James' death in 1907. In South Bend they became friends with Laura C. B. DeRhodes; this friendship resulted in Laura building the K. C. DeRhodes House by Wright. Mary then moved to live with Isabel who was already working in the Oak Park Studio for Wright. The Isabel Roberts House was built for mother and daughter to share.

Isabel Roberts stated that she was the designer of this house, although since it came from Wright's studio it has always been attributed to him.

== Isabel Roberts after Wright ==
Isabel Roberts and her mother did not have the chance to enjoy their prairie-style home for long. They moved from River Forest to St. Cloud, Florida, a decade after the house was completed. Mary Roberts was in failing health due to the lingering effects of influenza. Isabel's sister Charlotte and her husband were by that time established residents of St. Cloud. Mary Roberts died in Florida, in 1920.

Once in Florida, Isabel Roberts went into architectural practice with Ida Annah Ryan, who was the first woman in the United States to earn a master's degree in architecture, from MIT. As the firm of Ryan and Roberts, they were among no more than a dozen architecture firms active in Orlando in the 1920s. Ryan and Roberts created landmark buildings in Central Florida, some of which still stand today. Isabel Roberts lived and practiced in Orlando for the remainder of her life and is buried in Orlando alongside her mother and her sister.

== See also ==
- List of Frank Lloyd Wright works
