= Shedd Park Fieldhouse =

- U.S. National Register of Historic Places
- Chicago Landmark
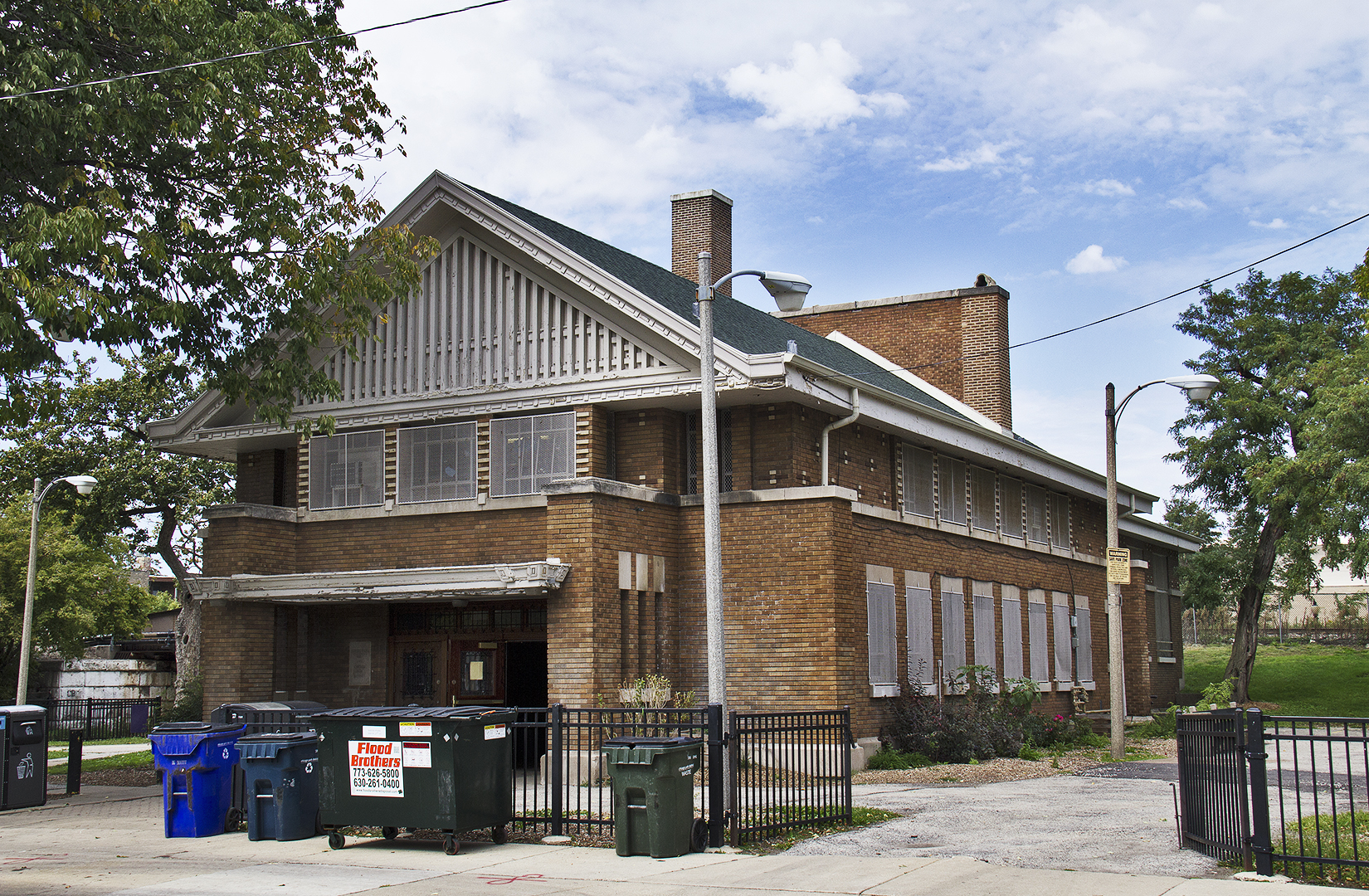

- Location within Chicago metropolitan area Location within Illinois Location within the United States
- Location: 3660 W. 23rd St., Chicago, Illinois
- Coordinates: 41°51′1″N 87°43′1″W
- Area: 0.6 acres (0.24 ha)
- Built: 1917
- Architect: William Drummond
- Architectural style: Prairie School
- NRHP reference No.: 74000755
- Added to NRHP: December 30, 1974

The Shedd Park Fieldhouse is the historic fieldhouse in Shedd Park, a public park in the South Lawndale community area of Chicago, Illinois. John G. Shedd, for whom the park and fieldhouse are named, gave the city the land for the park. The Prairie School building was designed by William Drummond and built in 1917. The brown brick building features limestone trim. A Prairie School gymnasium designed by Michaelsen and Rognstad was added to the building in 1928.

The fieldhouse was added to the National Register of Historic Places on December 30, 1974, and was designated as a Chicago Landmark on February 11, 2004.
