= Frances Thielbar =

American nurse (1907-1962)

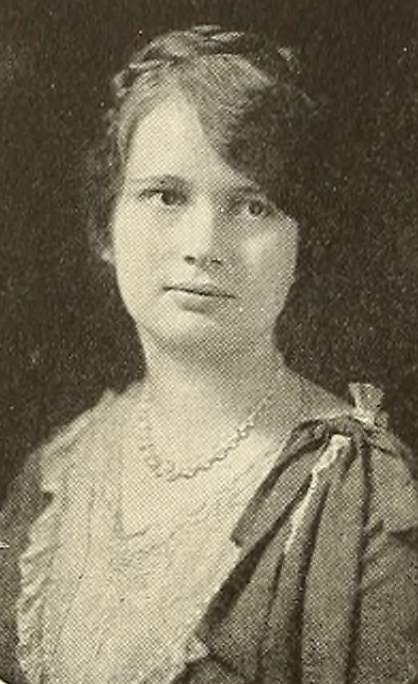
- Thielbar, from the 1929 yearbook of Wellesley College
- Born: July 10, 1907; River Forest, Illinois, U.S.
- Died: March 21, 1962 (age 54); Pennsylvania, U.S.
- Occupations: Nurse, nursing educator

Frances Charlotte Thielbar (July 10, 1907 – March 21, 1962) was an American nurse and nurse educator. She taught at Butler Hospital from 1932 to 1942, was a professor at the University of Chicago from 1942 to 1960, and was active in national bodies for nursing education and nursing research, and "one of the country's leading nursing educators".

== Early life and education ==
Thielbar was born in River Forest, Illinois, the daughter of Frederick John Thielbar and Dorothea T. Burgess Thielbar. Her father was an architect. She graduated from Wellesley College in 1929. She earned a bachelor's degree in nursing from Yale University in 1932, and a master's degree in nursing education from the University of Chicago in 1938. She completed doctoral studies at the University of Chicago in 1951.

== Career ==
In the 1930s, Thielbar taught and supervised psychiatric nursing courses at Butler Hospital in Rhode Island. She was a nursing educator and associate professor at the University of Chicago from 1942 to 1960. In her last two years she was head of the graduate division of the University of Pennsylvania School of Nursing.

Thielbar was active in leadership of the National League of Nursing Education and the Association of Collegiate Schools of Nursing. She served on the board of directors of the journals American Journal of Nursing and Nursing Research. She was a member of the Rhode Island State Board of Nurse Examiners and director of the Rhode Island League of Nursing Education.

== Publications ==
- "Ward Teaching in a Mental Hospital" (1934)
- "Sedatives and Nursing Care" (1935)
- "Nursing School Catalogs Analyzed" (1939)
- "Research in psychiatric nursing" (1949)
- "Administrative Organization of Collegiate Schools of Nursing" (1953)
- Nursing Administration Cases (1956)

== Personal life ==
Thielbar died in Philadelphia in 1962, at the age of 54, from heart trouble.
