= William Eugene Drummond =

American architect (1876–1948)

William Eugene Drummond (March 28, 1876 – September 13, 1948) was an American architect based in Chicago who designed in the Prairie School of architecture.

== Early years and education ==
He was born in Newark, New Jersey, the son of carpenter and cabinet maker Eugene Drummond and his wife Ida Marietta Lozier. The family relocated from Newark to Chicago in 1886; William was ten. The Drummonds settled on the West Side of Chicago, in Austin, at 813 Central Avenue. William Drummond grew up in the village of Austin and attended the Austin public schools. The Drummond family house is standing as it underwent at the hands of William and Eugene. William learned much in the remodeling of the family house. He and his father built the present house around and over the old house, with the family still living in it. The family owned the house until 1966. William was fifteen years older than his brother Frank; there were five girls between them. All seven Drummond children grew up in the village of Austin.

William Drummond was admitted to the University of Illinois School of Architecture in 1899, at the same time that fellow Prairie School architect Walter Burley Griffin was attending there. However, financial difficulties forced Drummond leave after one year.

== Prairie School years ==
Thereafter, Drummond began working in Chicago in the firm of architect Louis Sullivan. Several months later, he went to work for Frank Lloyd Wright. Drummond would serve as the chief draftsman for several well-known Wright's commissions, including the home of Edwin and Mamah Borthwick Cheney in Oak Park, the Frederick Robie House in Chicago, the Susan Lawrence Dana House in Springfield, Illinois, and the Larkin Company Administration Building in Buffalo. Drummond obtained his architect's license in 1901. In the years 1901–1905 he worked for Wright part-time while also working full-time for Richard E. Schmidt (1901–1902) and Daniel H. Burnham (1903–1905). Drummond returned to full-time employment with Wright from 1905 to 1909, when disagreement about pay caused him to leave Wright's studio. But Drummond was a key figure in Wright's studio during its most productive Prairie years. As Wright's son, John, relates:

William Drummond, Francis Barry Byrne, Walter Burley Griffin, Albert McArthur (Albert Chase McArthur), Marion Mahony, Isabel Roberts and George Willis were the draftsmen. Five men, two women. They wore flowing ties, and smocks suitable to the realm. The men wore their hair like Papa, all except Albert, he didn't have enough hair. They worshiped Papa! Papa liked them! I know that each one of them was then making valuable contributions to the pioneering of the modern American architecture for which my father gets the full glory, headaches and recognition today!

In 1907 Drummond married Clara Alice McCulloch Christian, a woman several years his senior whose first husband died of tuberculosis. Their union produced three sons: Robert, William and Alan. In 1910, Mary Roberts, Isabel Roberts' mother, sold the property next to their celebrated River Forest, Illinois, Isabel Roberts House, to their friend and associate William Drummond, who built his own Prairie style home there.

== Private practice ==
Upon parting ways with Wright, Drummond went into private practice, even though he had already undertaken his first commission in 1908, the First Congregational Church of Austin. In 1912 he went into partnership with Louis Guenzel, who had been a draftsman for Dankmar Adler and Louis Sullivan. Isabel Roberts worked for Guenzel and Drummond for about a year. The partnership dissolved just after the start of World War I, in 1915.

Drummond continued his independent practice thereafter, designing churches, residences and small commercial buildings in the Prairie style, his work in the pure Prairie idiom culminating in 1920 in the delightfully elegant Hollywood Community House (also known as Hollywood House) in the Hollywood neighborhood straddling the villages of Brookfield and Riverside, just west of Chicago, Illinois.

Drummond was among those who submitted designs in the famous 1922 competition for the Chicago Tribune Building. However, Drummond did not win this competition. Howells and Hood of a New York firm won with their Gothic design.

The prevailing view of his later career is that, as the public taste changed during the 1920s, Drummond's work bore fewer of the hallmarks of the Prairie School. Instead, his work was sometimes characterized by English cottage and Tudor elements, many in River Forest, typified by the Edward W. Scott Residence (1928) with its massive chimney, steeply pitched gables and paired multi-story bay window towers, and by the River Forest Public Library (1928–1930).

William Drummond took part in the planning commission of River Forest throughout the 1920s and 1930s, while also remodeling several of Wright's designs. Shortly before his death on September 13, 1948, Drummond published a book detailing a plan to redesign the United States Capitol.

== Partial list of works ==
- Abajo Mountains (Utah) Resort (project)
- Residence (1901); 742 Franklin Street, River Forest, Illinois
- L. Griffen house project (1902); Buena Park, Chicago, Illinois
- L. Wolff house (circa 1903); 4234 N Hazel, Chicago, Illinois
- Residence (1904); 185 E Quincy Street, Riverside, Illinois
- Dexter M. Ferry, Jr. House project (1910); Grosse Pointe, Michigan
- William E. Drummond Residence (1910); 559 Edgewood Place, River Forest, Illinois
- Albert W. Muther Residence (1910–1912); 560 (580) Edgewood Place, River Forest, Illinois
- Charles Barr Residence (1910–1912); 7234 Quick Street, River Forest, Illinois
- Curtis Yelland House (1911); 37 River Heights Road, Mason City, Iowa
- River Forest Methodist Church (1912); 7070 Lake Street, River Forest, Illinois
- River Forest Bank Building (1912); River Forest, Illinois
- Gordon Abbott House (1912); 105 N. Grant, Hinsdale, Illinois
- George Stahmer House (1913); Fourth Street and Chicago Avenue, Maywood, Illinois
- River Forest Women's Club (1913); 526 Ashland Avenue, River Forest, Illinois
- John B. Franke House, 2131 Forest Park Blvd, Ft Wayne, Indiana (1914) – with Barry Byrne
- Ralph S. Baker House (1914–1915); 1226 Ashland Avenue, Wilmette, Illinois
- John A. Klesert House (1915); Keystone Avenue, River Forest, Illinois
- First Congregational Church (1915); 5701 West Midway Park, Chicago, Illinois 60644
- Shedd Park Fieldhouse (1917); 3660 West 23rd Street, Chicago, Illinois
- Coonley Estate "Thorncroft" (1919–1921); Riverside, Illinois
- Brookfield Kindergarten [aka Hilly House] (1920); 3601 Forest Avenue, Brookfield, Illinois
- Hollywood Community Hall (1921); Washington and Hollywood, Hollywood, Brookfield, Illinois
- Isabel Roberts House Remodeling (1922); Edgewood Place, River Forest, Illinois
- Langhorne Residence Remodeling (1924–1940); Chicago, Illinois
- Badenoch House (1925); 555 Edgewood Place, River Forest, Illinois
- O. B. Higgins Residence (1927); 535 Edgewood Place, River Forest, Illinois
- Edward W. Scott Residence (1928); 619 Keystone, River Forest, Illinois
- River Forest Public Library (1928–1930); River Forest, Illinois
- Rookery Building Remodeling (1930); Chicago, Illinois
- Washington Capital Redevelopment (1946–1947); Washington, DC
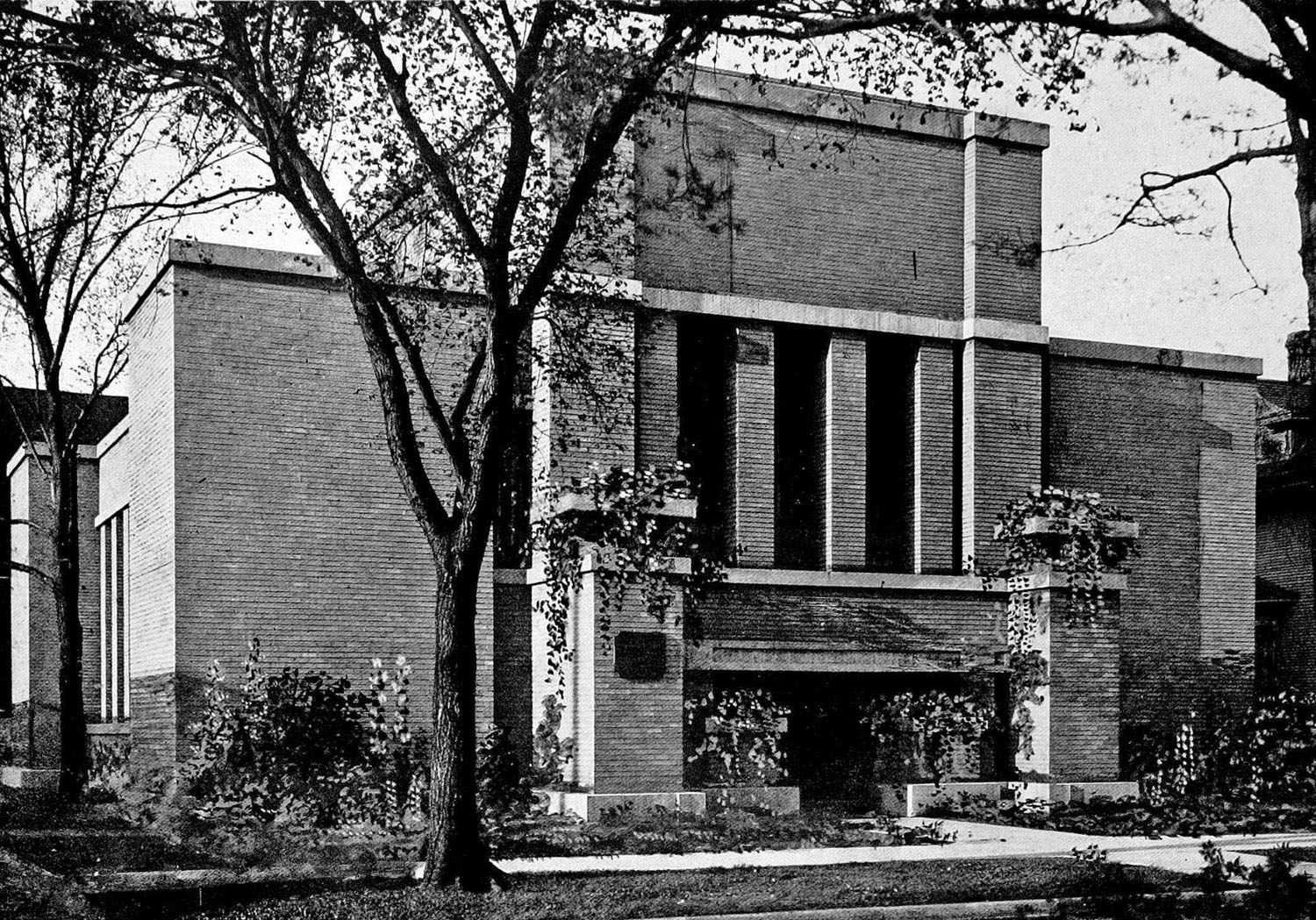
First Congregational Church; Austin, Illinois 1908

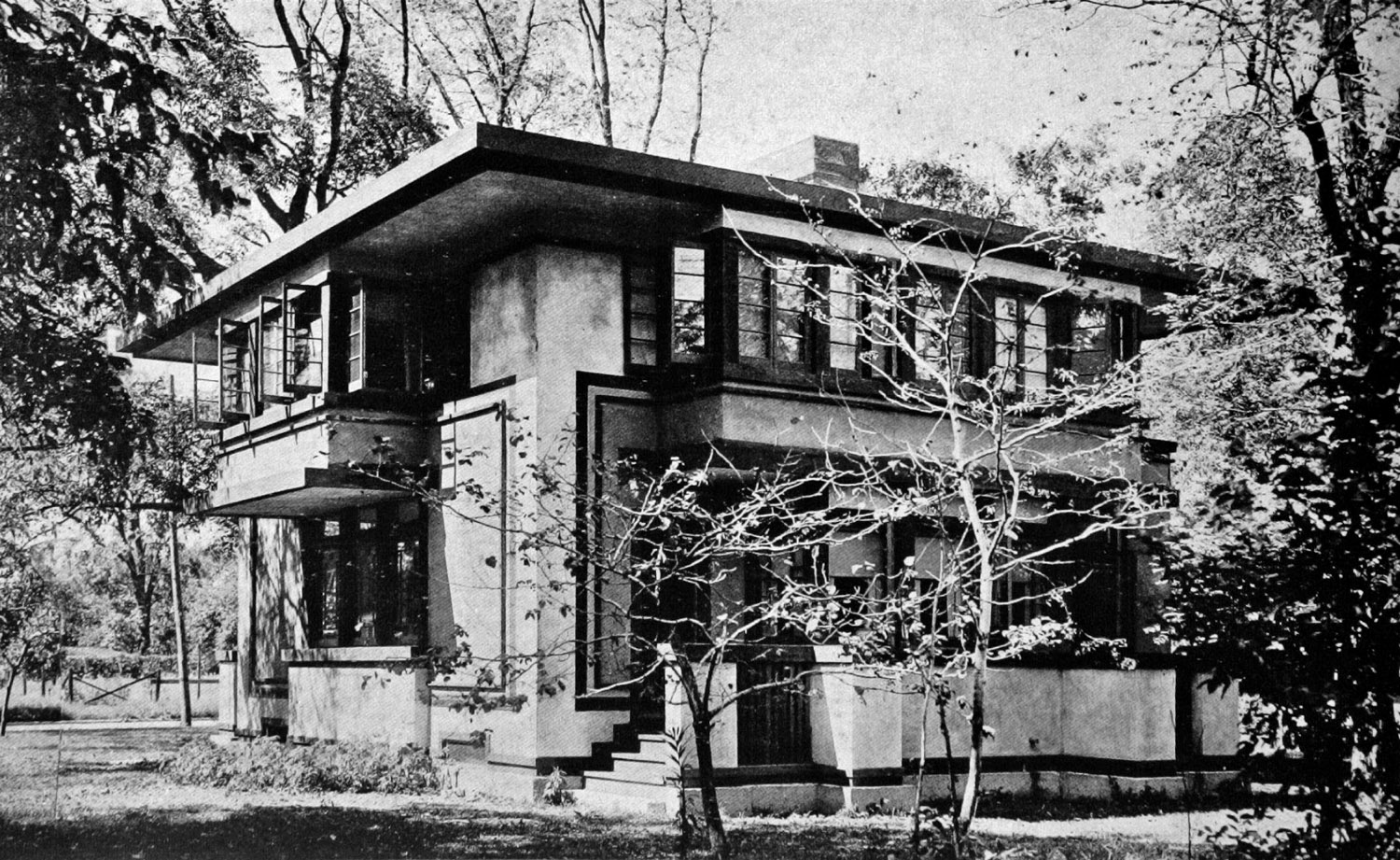
William E. Drummond Residence; River Forest, Illinois 1910

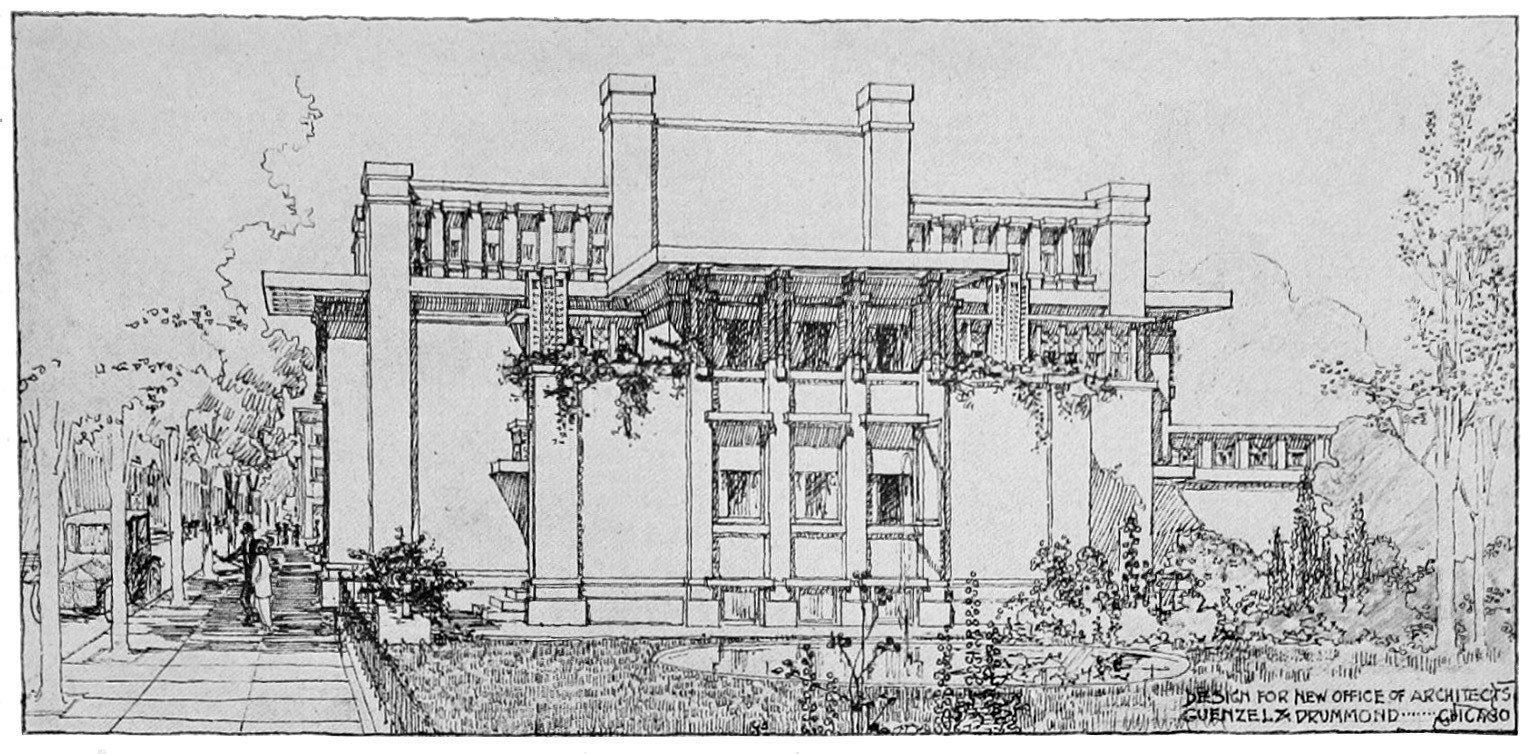
Drawing of the design for an office building for Guenzel & Drummond, ca. 1912
