= Kathryn McGee =

American activist for Down Syndrome

- Born: Kathryn Greene; May 6, 1920; Chicago, Illinois, United States
- Died: February 16, 2012 (aged 91); River Forest, Illinois, United States
- Occupation: Activist
- Known for: Down syndrome activism
- Notable work: organized Mongoloid Development Council
- Children: at least 4

Kathryn "Kay" McGee (née Greene, May 6, 1920, in Chicago, Illinois – February 16, 2012 in River Forest, Illinois) was an American activist, recognized for founding two of the first organizations for the benefit of those with Down syndrome.

The birth of her fourth child, Tricia McGee, on March 16, 1960, commenced a decades-long effort to bring parents of children with Down Syndrome together to create medical and educational options for such children. Tricia McGee was diagnosed as a mongoloid shortly after birth, which is what doctors called a person with Down syndrome when Tricia was born, but is now considered a slur. Down Syndrome is a genetic disorder that was first described in 1866 by British doctor John L. Down. It was discovered to be caused by an extra chromosome by French pediatrician Jérôme Lejeune in July 1958, less than two years before Tricia was born. Medical advice in 1960 was typically to institutionalize children with Down Syndrome. After Tricia's birth in 1960, the family pediatrician recommended that the McGees place her in an institution rather than bring her home from the hospital. A few years later when he saw her functioning well at the Alcuin Montessori School in River Forest, Illinois, he explained that he had been told in medical school to make that recommendation to people, and said that he would never do so again. After bringing Tricia home and adjusting to the reality that such an infant faces exceptional developmental challenges, Kay and Martin attempted to learn about Down Syndrome and find similarly situated parents in the Chicago area.

== Early experience and efforts at organizing parents ==
Within six months Kay determined that there were children with Down Syndrome in communities, but that they were not visible, as society was not accepting and parents were protective of their vulnerable family members. In late 1960 Kay invited those parents she was able to contact to her River Forest home to discuss the medical and developmental issues that all such parents faced. Kay notes that obtaining lists of those with the medical condition was challenging, but there were no HIPAA laws back then, and parents were located and contacted by McGee. She heard about the Dr. Julian D. Levinson Research Foundation for Mentally Retarded Children at Cook County Hospital in Chicago. The Foundation wanted to test a vitamin regimen on people with Down Syndrome and evaluate the results. Delilah White, a psychologist who was a leader at the Levinson Foundation, introduced Kay to a woman who had a 40-year-old daughter with Down Syndrome. The daughter's age surprised Kay, who had been told people with Down Syndrome had short life spans. Kay decided to get a group of similarly situated people together and organize a meeting to hear from this woman, who was scheduled to move away to Florida the following week. She got about 15 parents to attend. They met in downtown Chicago in late 1960, probably at the Pick Congress Hotel. Within the following year, the group expanded, and Kathryn organized the Mongoloid Development Council (MDC), and a Certificate of Incorporation was filed by Kay McGee in 1963 with the Illinois Secretary of State. This group was the first known support group for families of children with Down Syndrome.

Parental hopes for a cure or major breakthrough were an initial aspiration of the young organization. Soon the focus turned to the best practices to assist the physical and emotional development of the Down Syndrome infants and children to allow each person to maximize their potential, limited though it might be in some cases. Kay McGee began the work of breaking down the barriers that limited the development of such children. She began to assemble the building blocks that were determined to be necessary by MDC. Those blocks included the ongoing effort to get into the area hospitals to provide initial counsel for new parents, education of doctors to allow greater acceptance that alternatives existed for these children, the push to arrange for preschool education for the children, overcoming the IQ issues that prevented access to the educable classes in public education, and opportunity for involvement for the children in the community. In those days children with Down Syndrome were placed in educational programs for "trainable" mentally retarded children rather than "educable" children. For most of those children, that meant attending school in segregated centers hidden away from the non-disabled student population.

== Expansion of educational options ==
As the children of MDC members began to achieve developmental milestones at a delayed but steady pace there was considerable focus on the need to work constantly on discipline and language skills and physical actions that might be accomplished unconsciously by children without a disability. It had become increasingly apparent that early education was needed on basics that other children pick up naturally. At age 3 Tricia began education outside the home at Alcuin Montessori School. The McGees were advised to put Tricia into special education through the public school system. The Montessori School was beginning to run grade schools at the time, but many teachers in the public schools had special education degrees, which made it a better place for Tricia and other such children. They realized that these children had to learn sociability in order to fit into society. They had to learn discipline. Many are naturally prone to want to hug and kiss everyone they meet.

Public schools were an important place to correct such actions and assimilate those with Down Syndrome in an environment in which they could observe how to conduct themselves with others. Kay determined Tricia's IQ through tests at the Levinson Foundation and later pressured the public school system not to relegate her daughter to trainable classes. In 1966 Tricia was the first child with Down Syndrome who was put into the educable class in first grade rather than the trainable classes in River Forest. In 1975 the Education for All Handicapped Children Act was passed, stating that all American public schools accepting federal funds must provide equal access to education for children with physical and mental disabilities, including children with Down Syndrome.

== Mongolism renamed Down Syndrome ==
In 1965 the World Health Organization accepted a recommendation to change the name "mongolism" to Down Syndrome. In 1972 Kay formally had the MDC name changed to abandon the pejorative term, mongoloid, from the organization's name. She signed the new articles of association which created the National Association for Down's Syndrome. The apostrophe and "s" were subsequently dropped, and the National Association for Down Syndrome (or NADS) continues to assist disabled children and adults.

== A national parents organization is created ==
In 1973 Kay founded the second nationally known support group for Down Syndrome families. When two doctors from California contacted Kay to ask her help in starting the National Down Syndrome Congress (NDSC), she encouraged those that contacted her to call an organizational meeting. She went to California and participated in the startup meeting of the organization. The NDSC was incorporated in Illinois, which was its headquarters until the 1990s. Today it is headquartered in Atlanta. They have held a national convention for 36 years at different sites throughout the country and international conventions in seven countries.

== Later life and legacy ==
In October 2009 NADS honored Kay McGee as its founder, and Kay delivered a speech to over 800 NADS parents and supporters. Tricia was also introduced, and she thanked the assembled audience and confidently left the podium to her mother. Tricia lives in an independent apartment at Misericordia Heart of Mercy on the north side of Chicago. Misericordia is now home to over 550 children and adults with developmental disabilities.

== Death ==
McGee died February 16, 2012, of natural causes at her home in River Forest, Illinois, aged 91. Kay was honored by a mural in her hometown of River Forest, Illinois.
