= K. C. DeRhodes House =

House in South Bend, Indiana

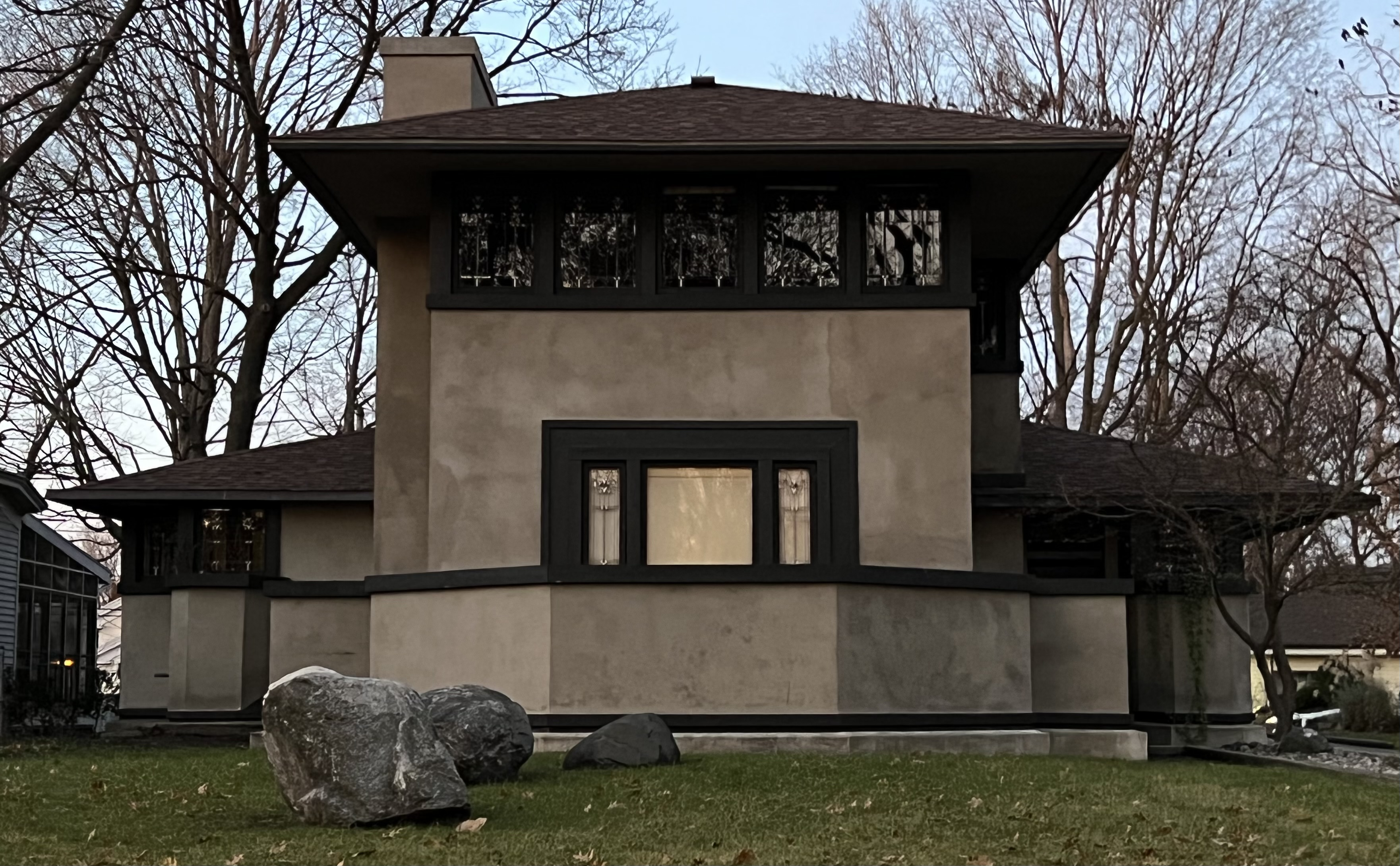
- K. C. DeRhodes House in December 2021
- Interactive map of the K. C. DeRhodes House area

General information
- Type: Wood, stucco
- Architectural style: Prairie School
- Location: 715 West Washington Street, South Bend, Indiana
- Coordinates: 41.6766°N 86.2600°W
- Construction started: 1906
- Governing body: Private

Design and construction
- Architect: Frank Lloyd Wright

The K. C. DeRhodes House was built for newlyweds Laura Caskey Bowsher DeRhodes and Kersey C. DeRhodes in 1906 by Frank Lloyd Wright. It is a Prairie style home located at 715 West Washington Street in South Bend, Indiana. The home was carefully restored by Tom and Suzanne Miller over more than four decades and remains in private ownership. It is one of two Wright homes in South Bend, the other being the Herman T. Mossberg Residence. It is one of eight Frank Lloyd Wright designed homes in Indiana, of which seven remain. It was also the first home Frank Lloyd Wright built in Indiana.

== Architecture ==
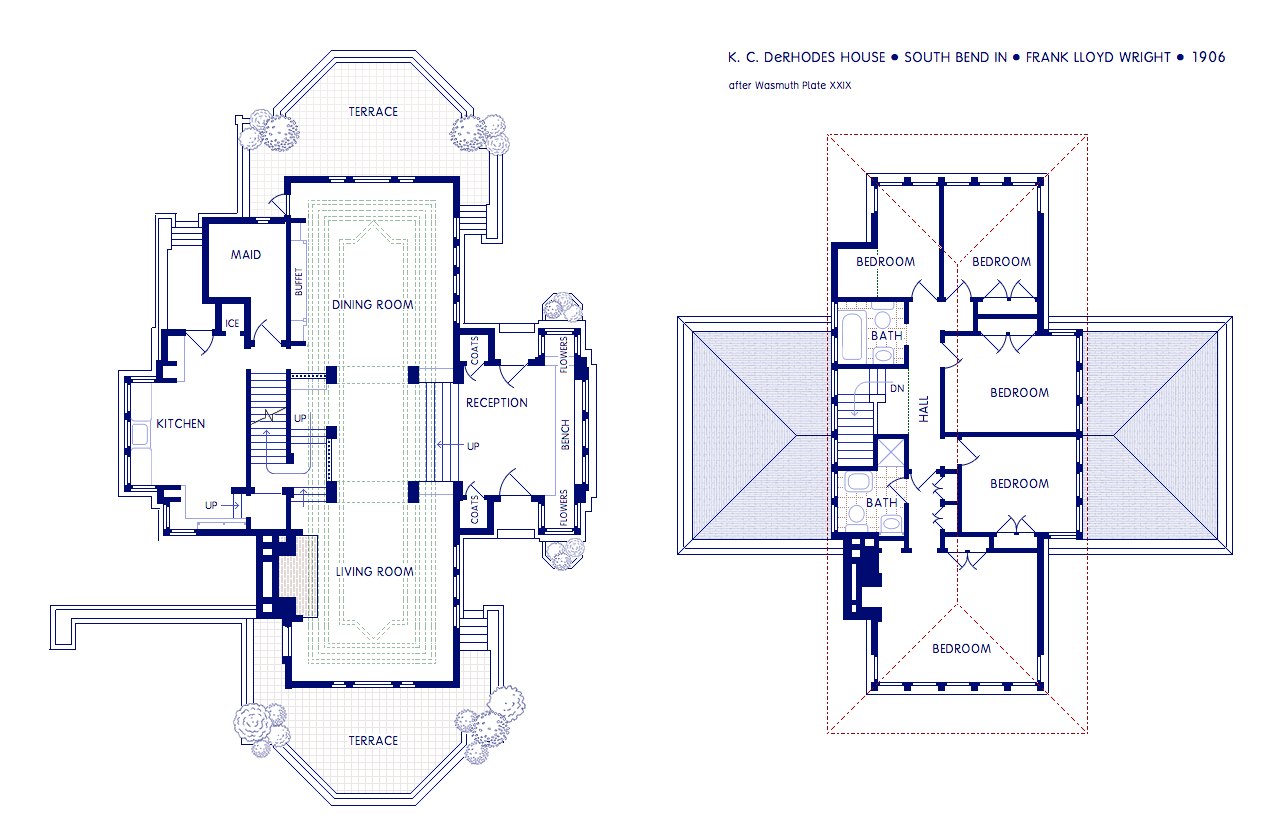
First and second floor plan

The DeRhodes house floor plan is nearly identical to—but on a 90-degree axis in relation to the front porch—the 1903–1904 Barton House in Buffalo, New York. Oriented south to north, the main floor is one large rectangular space subdivided by piers and low bookcases with light screens into three spaces: a reception area, a large living room with fireplace toward the south (front) and a large dining room with Wright's customary built-in china cabinets toward the (north) rear. An entry/foyer to the east and the stairway and kitchen wing to the west extend the plan into a cruciform shape. Terraces protected by low walls at the north and south ends of the house extend the living space into the surrounding landscape. The downstairs maid's room in this house has been converted to a half bath.

The exterior of the DeRhodes house exhibits many of the features associated with Wright's Prairie School architecture: the stucco exterior with wood trim, the strong water table, the pronounced horizontal lines of the continuous window sills and terrace parapets, the leaded glass "light screens" of the windows, the grouping of the windows into continuous bands, and the low-profile hip roof.

The celebrated rendering of the DeRhodes house by Wright's assistant Marion Mahony Griffin is considered by scholars to be among the best to emerge from the Oak Park studio, and was thought so by Wright himself, who inscribed it "Drawn by Mahony after FLLW and Hiroshige".

== History ==
The house was built for Laura Caskey Bowsher DeRhodes (November 5, 1864 – May 27, 1952) and Kersey C. DeRhodes (February 7, 1862 – March 25, 1944). Bowsher and DeRhodes were married in 1906. Bowsher learned about Wright after visiting her friend Isabel Roberts (the original owner of the Isabel Roberts House), an architectural designer and draughtsman in Wright's Oak Park studio. Bowsher commissioned Wright's Oak Park studio to design a house for her to be located at 715 West Washington Street.

Laura and Kersey DeRhodes lived in their Wright-designed house the rest of their lives; they were South Bend social and civic leader. Laura DeRhodes was still living in the house in 1940 when she was interviewed by Wright researcher Grant Manson, whose notes of the interview are in the Oak Park Public Library. Laura lived in the house for the rest of her life, dying there in May 1952. Wright unsuccessfully tried to buy the home, whose contents were instead divided four ways. Laura left the building to the First Methodist Church of South Bend to be used as a parsonage, but it never served that function. The household goods were to be divided among First Methodist Church (who selected only the baby grand piano), the Progress Club (which took only the lawn mower and silver), the YWCA and the Camp Fire Girls (who received about half of the home's furnishings including the fire screen and andirons).

In 1954 the Methodist Church sold the house. It was used by a Masonic lodge as the Avalon Grotto clubhouse from 1954 until 1978. During that time, much of the interior was painted and the main fireplace was covered over. In 1978, Thomas and Suzanne Miller of South Bend bought the home for $67,000 and completed a total restoration over the next several decades. Tom Miller died in 2018 and Suzanne Miller died in 2021. The estate of Suzanne Miller placed the home on the market in mid-2021, and the Frank Lloyd Wright Building Conservancy gave the Millers its Wright Spirit Award after Suzanne's death. The lawyer and former U.S. ambassador Douglas Kmiec offeree to buy the house for $800,000. However, Kmiec was unable to occupy the home, and he sold it to local attorney Andrew B. Jones and software CEO Stephanie Decker in February 2022 for $775,000. The house was put up for sale again in 2025.

== See also ==
- List of Frank Lloyd Wright works
