= River Forest Public Library =

Public library

- 41.8931°N 87.8143°W
- Location: 735 Lathrop Ave, River Forest, Illinois, USA
- Type: Public library
- Established: 1905

Collection
- Size: 94,394

Access and use
- Circulation: 235,024
- Population served: 11,172

Other information
- Budget: $1.3 million
- Director: Sue Quinn
- Employees: 25
- Website: www.riverforestlibrary.org

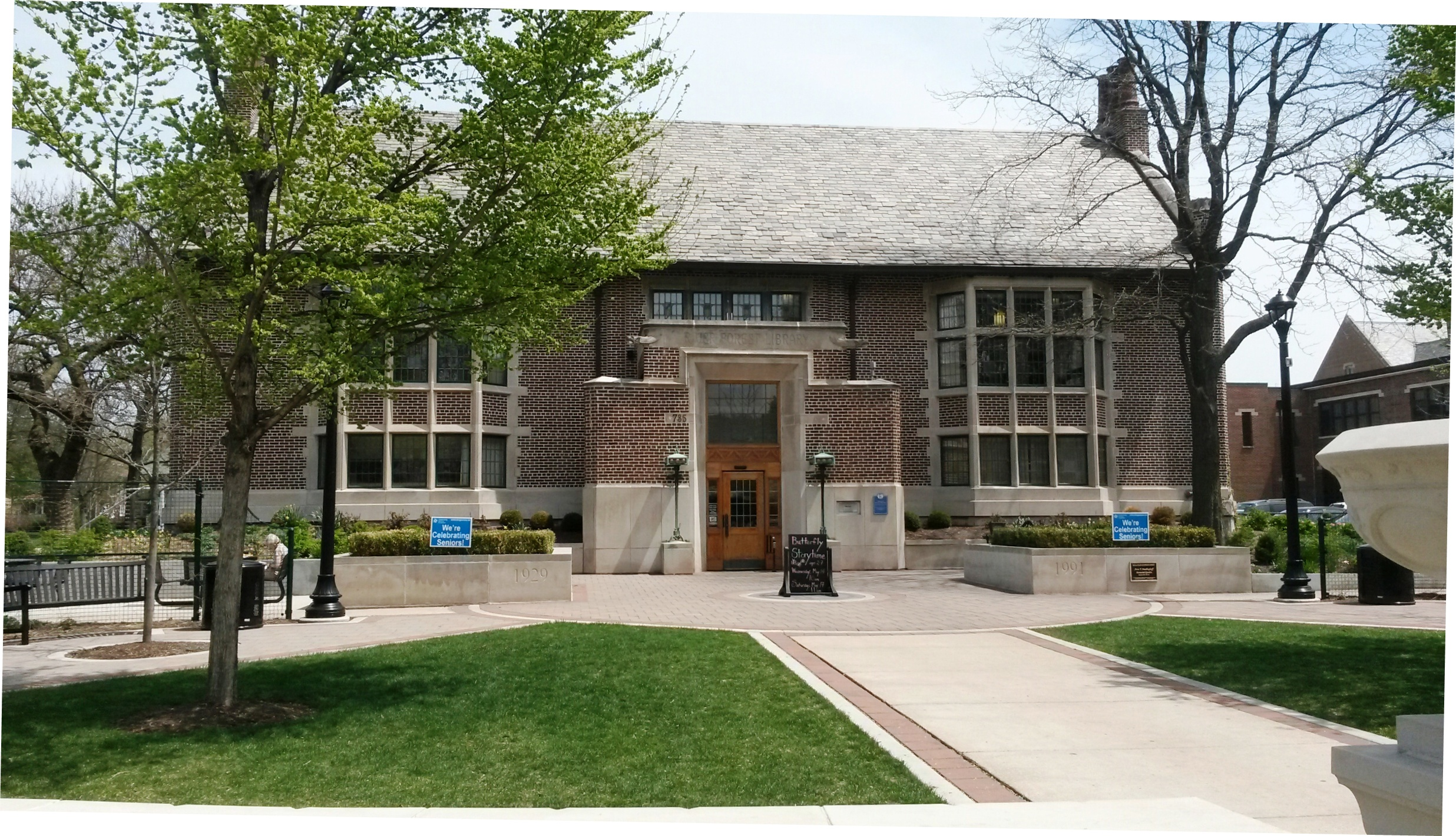
River Forest Public Library exterior

The River Forest Public Library is located at 735 Lathrop Avenue in River Forest, Illinois, a suburban community west of Chicago. It serves a core population of approximately 11,000 residents, and drawing reciprocal patrons from the surrounding area. The library is part of the SWAN (System Wide Automated Network) consortium, which connects libraries in over 80 suburbs of Chicago through a shared catalog and other services.

== History ==
The River Forest Public Library opened its doors in 1905, in a small store front property on Park Avenue. The current library building, designed by Prairie School architect, William Eugene Drummond, was completed in 1929. An addition to the building was added in 1989. A more complete history of the Library can be found on the River Forest Public Library website.

The library is a designated significant property, as determined in a 2013 survey commissioned for the Village of River Forest Historic Preservation Commission.

== Collections and programs ==
The River Forest Public Library has over 90,000 items, including books, CDs, DVDs, periodicals, and an expansive collection of digital materials and electronic resources. RFPL provides access to a wide variety of databases online through the library website for River Forest Library cardholders. The library also provides inter-library loan service for books and articles to cardholders as well as a variety of programs for patrons of all ages, including 2 seasonal reading programs open to all RFPL cardholders.

== Governance ==
The River Forest Public Library is run by a director hired by the library's Board of Trustees. The seven trustees are elected for staggered six year terms during the April consolidated elections. The library is divided into several service departments: Adult and Teen Services, Children's Services, Materials Services, in addition to the Administration Department. Staff consist of approximately eight full-time employees and 15-17 part-time employees.

== Additional resources on River Forest ==
- History of River Forest by Albert Hall. 1938.
- River Forest: Origins, History, Founders, and Monuments by Bradford Schwarz. 2005
- A Guidebook to the Architecture of River Forest by Jeannette S. Fields, editor. 1990.
- River Forest History Files Contains materials from 1876-2002.
