= Arthur J. Bidwill =

American politician and lawyer (1903–1985)

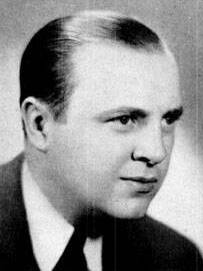
- official portrait, circa 1939

Member of the Illinois Senate (2nd District)
- In office 1966–1972

Member of the Illinois Senate (1st District)
- In office 1956–1966

Member of the Illinois Senate (7th District)
- In office 1938–1956
- Preceded by: Charles F. Baumrucker
- Succeeded by: Ronald Victor Libonati

Member of the Illinois Senate (7th District)
- In office 1934–1935
- Succeeded by: Charles F. Baumrucker

Personal details
- Born: June 24, 1903 Chicago, Illinois, U.S.
- Died: October 4, 1985 (aged 82) Lake Geneva, Wisconsin, U.S.
- Party: Republican

Arthur J. Bidwill (June 24, 1903 – October 4, 1985) was an American politician and lawyer.

Born in Chicago, Illinois, Bidwill received his law degree from Notre Dame Law School and lived in River Forest, Illinois. He was a Republican. Bidwell was elected to the Illinois Senate in 1934, defeating Democrat Charles F. Baumrucker by a margin of 60 votes but was ousted four and one half months later by the Democrat-controlled Senate on a vote of 28 to 14 citing voting irregularities. A Senate committee had found that Baumrucker had actually won the vote by a majority of 149 votes. His removal was widely seen by Republicans as political as Bidwill had campaigned on challenging the Cook County "Democratic machine." Only one Democratic senator voted against the resolution, T. V. Smith, alleging that the Democrats were acting with "brute power" and "stupidity". The same committee recommended Baumrucker as his replacement.

Bidwill ran for the seat in 1938 and defeated Baumrucker. Bidwill went on to serve in the Illinois Senate until 1972 and was president pro tempore of the senate. His nephews Richard A. Walsh and William D. Walsh also served in the Illinois General Assembly. Bidwill died in Lake Geneva, Wisconsin.

He was the Republican nominee for Illinois Auditor of Public Accounts in 1936.

He ran unsuccessfully for the Republican nomination for Illinois Secretary of State in 1940.

== Notes ==
Party political offices
Preceded by Harry G. Wright	Republican nominee for Illinois Auditor of Public Accounts; 1936	Succeeded by Arthur C. Lueder
