= Herman T. Mossberg Residence =

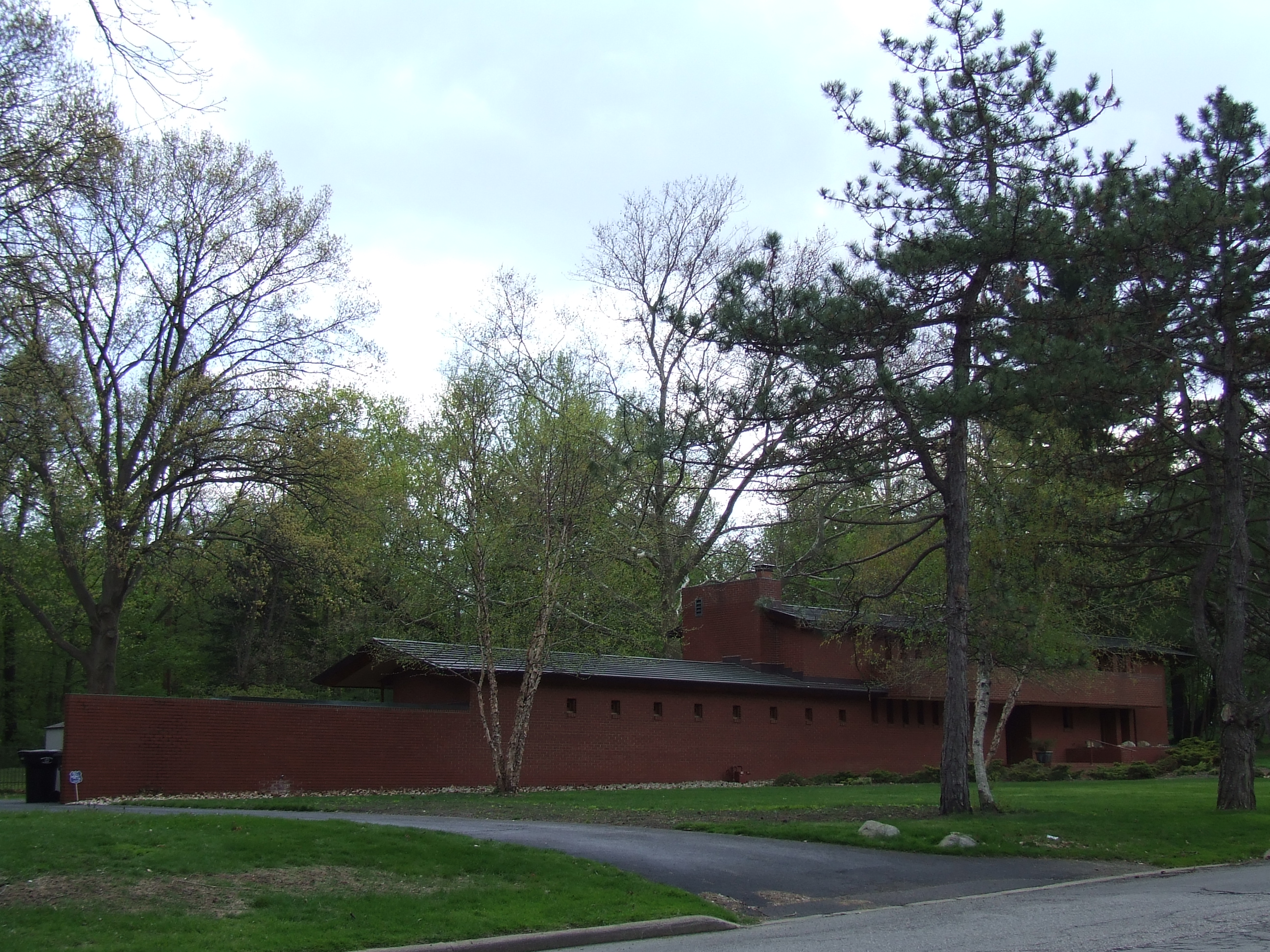

- Location within Indiana

General information
- Type: House
- Architectural style: Usonian
- Location: South Bend, Indiana
- Coordinates: 41.6435°N 86.2272°W
- Construction started: 1948

Design and construction
- Architect: Frank Lloyd Wright

The Herman T. Mossberg Residence is a house designed by the American architect Frank Lloyd Wright. It was built for Herman T. Mossberg and his wife Gertrude in 1948 in South Bend, Indiana, and remains in private hands today. It is one of two Wright residences in South Bend, the other being the K. C. DeRhodes House.

== Background ==
Mossberg grew up in Chicago and it was his youthful appreciation of Wright's Robie House that instilled an idea that, if possible, he would like to have a house like that one day. The Mossbergs settled in South Bend, where Herman Mossberg became a successful lithography press printer, Mossberg & Company Inc. remains in business today, operated by second and third generations of the family. When Wright's career had its resurgence in the late 1930s, with broad press coverage of such works as Fallingwater and the Johnson Wax Building, the Mossbergs wrote to Wright asking if he would recommend one of his former students to design a house for them in the manner of Wright. Wright responded, "Why have an imitation when you can have the original?" and invited them to visit him at Taliesin in Spring Green, Wisconsin.

== Initial visit to Taliesin ==
This, they did, on a cold day when Wright and Wes Peters had been to Kalamazoo, Michigan, to see the site of the Parkwyn Village homes Wright would be designing there. Wright was so cold and tired from the trip that Peters had to carry him into the house from the car. After dinner, as was the custom at Taliesin, there was a musical performance. The Wrights and the Mossbergs were seated together as one of the apprentices played Beethoven's Moonlight Sonata. When the music concluded, Wright turned to Gertrude Mossberg and said, "Ah, that man Beethoven! The greatest genius the world has known! Save my own!" Gertrude Mossberg whispered to her husband, "What have we gotten ourselves in for?" Nonetheless, the Mossbergs gave Wright the commission to design their home.

== Designing the home ==
At the time, Wright's Usonian style had matured, and the Mossberg Residence is one of the finest examples of it. Even so, it also displays concepts that harken back to his mature Prairie style. The living room's design and proportions are inspired by the living room at Taliesin. The stairway to the balcony gallery and daughter's bedroom is suspended from above, like the stairway from the living room to Bear Run at Fallingwater. Belden brick and tidewater cypress, as well as radiant-heat poured Cherokee red concrete floors, are all elements typical of the best Usonian homes.

Wright and Gertrude Mossberg had a great appreciation for one another which resulted in Wright breaking some of his famous rules in the design of this house. One of the hallmarks of a Usonian house was that the smallish, windowless kitchens that Wright called the "workspace" were normally placed at the center of the house, with a ceiling higher than the rest, to allow cooking odors to rise, rather than to drift into the rest of the house. Wright's first design for the Mossbergs had such a kitchen. When she saw it, Gertrude Mossberg expressed her dismay that the kitchen had no windows. This was a common aspect in the Usonian house designs. For example, a window was added in the Robert Levin House despite Wright's wishes, and he never signed the house. A similar expression of dismay from one of the Kalamazoo clients at about this same time had resulted in Wright imperiously rolling up his drawings and saying, "Madam, you are not worthy of a Frank Lloyd Wright home." That couple was left with the problem of finding a new architect. But in Gertrude Mossberg's case, things went differently. "Why do you need a window in your kitchen?" asked Wright. "Why, Mr. Wright, to see my birds," she replied. "Well then, you shall have your window," Wright responded. And in fact, the Mossberg house as built has a large bank of French doors in the kitchen, looking directly into the back yard. Wright was also famous for having eliminated basements from his residential designs. The Mossberg house has a basement, again, at Gertrude Mossberg's request.

Gertrude Mossberg bore a striking resemblance to Frank Lloyd Wright's beloved Aunt Susan, wife of the Rev. Jenkin Lloyd Jones, which may have been among the reasons he worked so sympathetically with the Mossbergs.

== Building the house ==
The house was constructed by the well-known South Bend builder, William A. Reinke Contractors who built over 100 homes in the South Bend area.

== Living with Wright ==
Wright-trained architect John H. "Jack" Howe, who was then a Taliesin apprentice, was assigned to live with the Mossbergs and oversee the building of the house. The Mossbergs developed a great fondness for Jack Howe which proved to be lifelong. Following Wright's death, whenever repairs or slight renovations were needed, the Mossbergs would consult Howe to be certain that all they did was in keeping with Wright's design principles. As a result, this remains among Wright's best-maintained and preserved residences, now owned by one of the grandsons of the original clients. In later years, Gertrude Mossberg would say that the best education she ever had was to live in a home designed by Wright.

== See also ==
- List of Frank Lloyd Wright works
