= Senator Carrell =

Senator Carrell may refer to:

- Mike Carrell (1944–2013), Washington State Senate
- Tom C. Carrell (1900–1972), California State Senate

== See also ==
- Senator Carroll (disambiguation)
