= William G. Thon =

American politician and lawyer

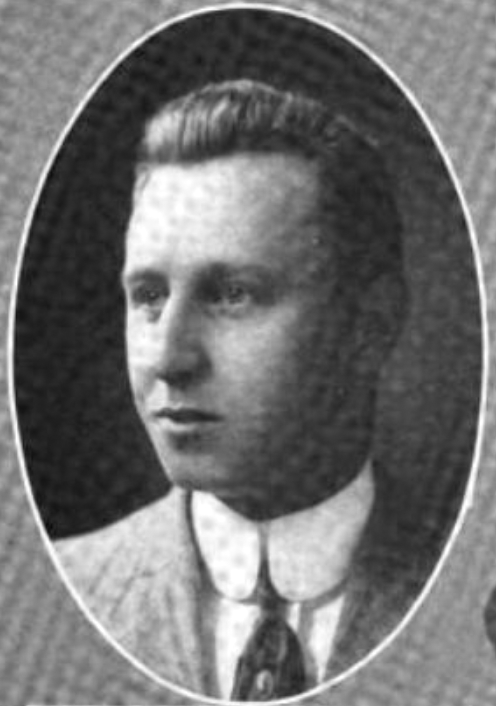

Member of the Illinois House of Representatives
- In office 1914–1922
- In office 1924–1926
- In office 1928–1932
- In office 1938 – May 23, 1953

Personal details
- Born: William Gustav Thon; February 27, 1886 Clinton, Iowa
- Died: May 23, 1953 (aged 67) Chicago, Illinois
- Party: Republican
- Education: Northwestern University Pritzker School of Law
- Occupation: Lawyer, politician

William Gustav Thon (February 27, 1886 – May 23, 1953) was an American politician and lawyer.

== Biography ==
Thon was born in Clinton, Iowa. He received his law degree from Northwestern University Pritzker School of Law and was admitted to the Illinois bar in 1909. Thon practiced law in Chicago, Illinois. Thon served in the Illinois House of Representatives from 1915 to 1923; from 1925 to 1927; from 1929 to 1933; and then from 1939 until his death in 1953. He was a Republican. Thon died at his home in Chicago, Illinois from a brief illness.
