= James B. Leonardo =

American businessman and politician

James Blazes Leonardo (February 3, 1889 – February 5, 1962) was an American businessman and politician.

Leonardo was born in Chicago, Illinois. He attended school at Chicago Public Schools.

Leonardo worked as a clerk for the Chicago Water Department from 1911 to 1915 and for the Chicago Corporation Counsel from 1915 to 1917. He then worked in the office of the Illinois Treasurer in the inheritance tax department from 1917 to 1926. Leonardo then served as vice-president of the J. C. Cartage Contractors, Inc. in Chicago. Leonardo served in the Illinois Senate from 1927 to 1943 and was a Republican.

He had lived in Pistakee Bay with his wife since 1948. Leonardo died in Chicago, Illinois.
