= Robert M. Woodward =

American politician

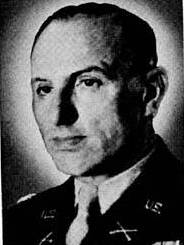

Member of the Illinois House of Representatives

Illinois Director of Civil Defense
- Appointed by: William Stratton

Personal details
- Party: Republican

Robert M. Woodward was an American politician who served as a member of the Illinois House of Representatives.
