= Patrick J. Carroll (Illinois politician) =

American politician

Member of the Illinois Senate

Personal details
- Born: 1873 Chicago, Illinois
- Died: January 15, 1938 (aged 64) Chicago, Illinois
- Party: Democratic

Patrick J. Carroll (1873 – January 15, 1938) was an American politician who served as a member of the Illinois Senate. He died on January 15, 1938.
