= Francis J. Loughran =

American politician

Member of the Illinois House of Representatives

Personal details
- Born: November 19, 1897 Joliet, Illinois
- Died: Unknown date
- Party: Democratic

Francis J. Loughran was an American politician who served as a member of the Illinois House of Representatives.
