= Charles F. Baumrucker =

American jeweler, businessman, and politician

Member of the Illinois Senate
- In office 1935–1939

Personal details
- Born: Charles Frank Baumrucker; March 5, 1884 Chicago, Illinois, U.S.
- Died: April 25, 1940 (aged 56)
- Party: Democratic
- Occupation: Politician, jeweler, businessman

Charles Frank Baumrucker (March 5, 1884 – April 25, 1940) was an American jeweler, businessman, and politician.

Born in Chicago, Illinois, Baumrucker went to the Chicago public schools. Baumrucker owned a jewelry business in River Forest, Illinois. He served as president of the village of River Forest and was a Democrat. Baumrucker served in the Illinois Senate from 1935 to 1939.
