= River Forest, Illinois =

- Village
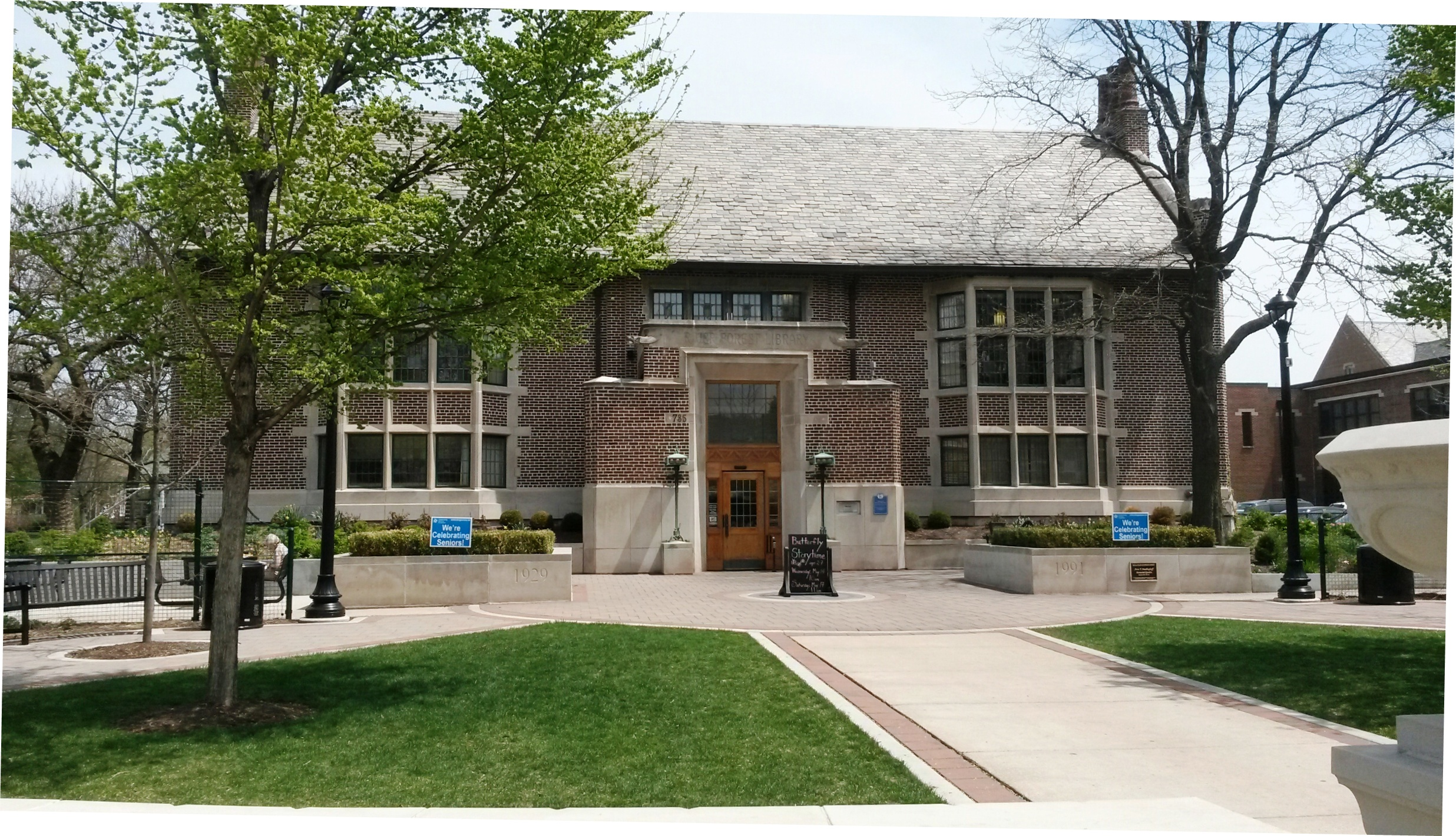
- River Forest Public Library

- Flag Seal
- Nicknames: RF, RoFo
- Location of River Forest in Cook County, Illinois.

- Location within Greater Chicago Location within Illinois Location within the United States
- Coordinates: 41°53′35″N 87°49′3″W
- Country: United States
- State: Illinois
- County: Cook
- Township: River Forest

Government
  - Type: Village

Area
  - Total: 2.48 sq mi (6.43 km^{2})
  - Land: 2.48 sq mi (6.42 km^{2})
  - Water: 0 sq mi (0.00 km^{2})

Population (2020)
  - Total: 11,794
  - Density: 4,725.1/sq mi (1,824.37/km^{2})
- Time zone: UTC−6 (CST)
  - Summer (DST): UTC−5 (CDT)
- ZIP Code(s): 60305
- Area code: 708
- FIPS code: 17-64304
- Wikimedia Commons: River Forest, Illinois
- Website: www.vrf.us

River Forest is a suburban village adjacent to Chicago in Cook County, Illinois, United States. Per the 2020 census, the population was 11,717. Two universities make their home in River Forest, Dominican University and Concordia University Chicago. The village is closely tied to the larger neighboring community of Oak Park. There are significant architectural designs located in River Forest such as the Winslow House by Frank Lloyd Wright. River Forest has a railroad station with service to Chicago on Metra's Union Pacific West Line.

== History ==
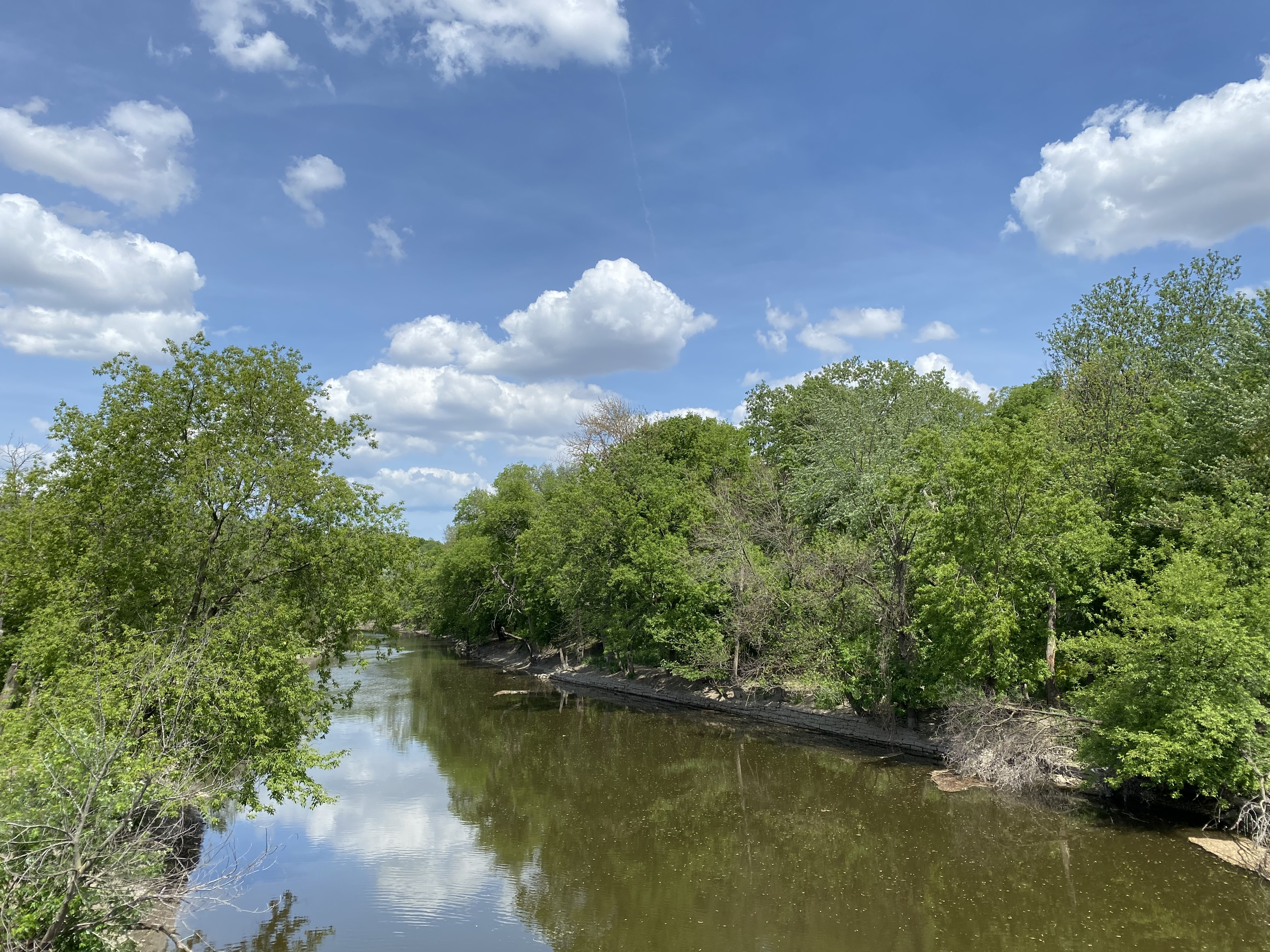
The Des Plaines River seen from the Lake Street bridge in River Forest, Illinois.

The Native American history of the area is closely tied to the Des Plaines River and includes Menominee and Chippewa settlements near what is now the Desplaines Avenue and Roosevelt Road forest preserves of Cook County. The Menominees would eventually be driven out by the Potowatomi Nation in 1810. The Potawatomi were in turn pushed west of the Mississippi by the Treaty of Chicago of 1833.

1831 saw the establishment of a steam sawmill on the east bank of the Des Plaines River. In 1842, the first planked road in what is now Lake Street was created. The community was known as Noyesville at the time. In 1848 the Galena and Chicago Union Railroad completed construction of tracks westward from Chicago, and train service commenced in January 1849.

In the 1850s two families acquired land and drove development in the area. David Thatcher settled in what is now western River Forest and named that part of the community Thatcher. Henry Quick arrived from Harlem, New York and named the eastern part of Noyesville as well as Harlem Avenue after his home town.

== Geography ==
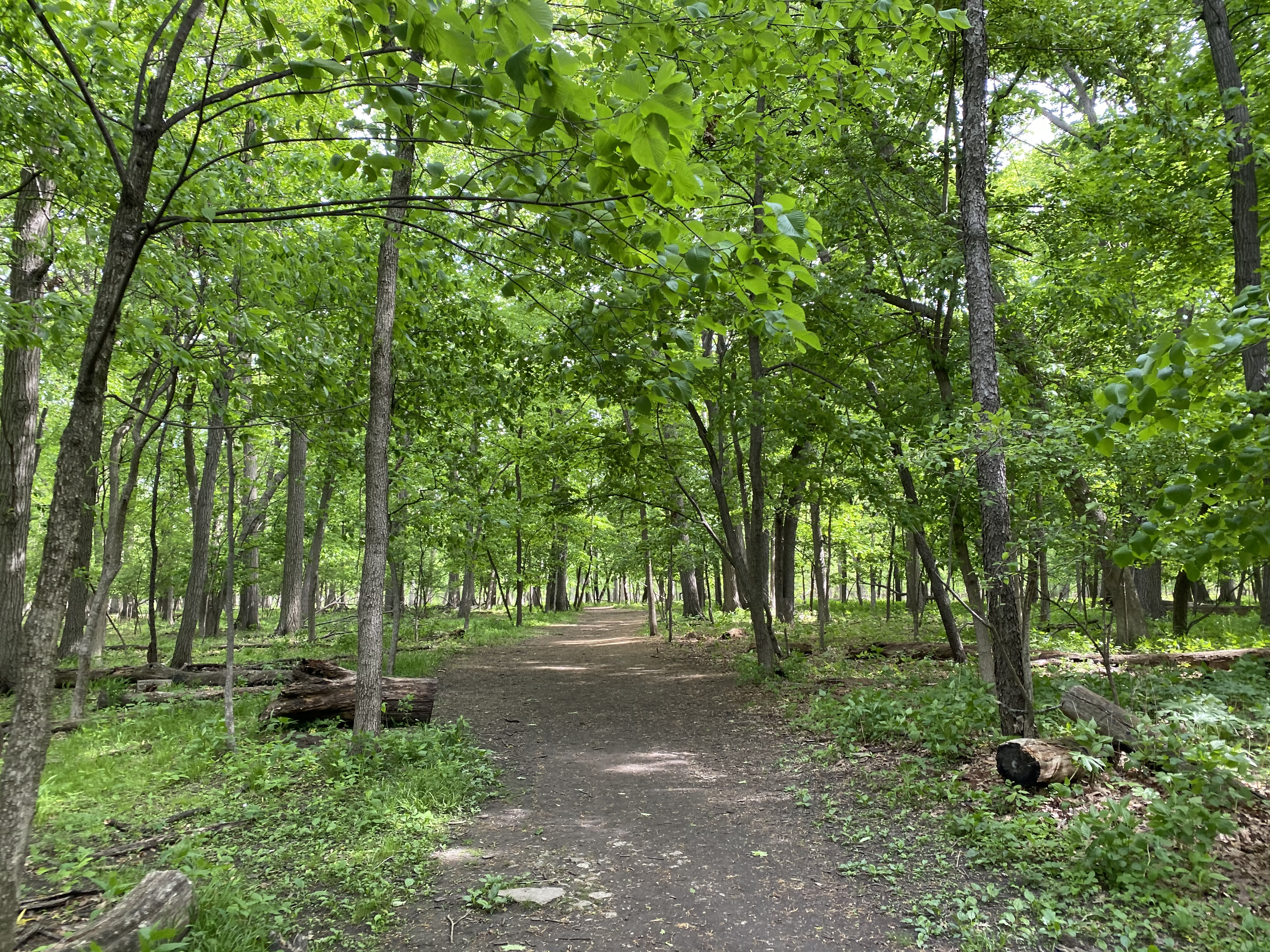
A trail in the Thatcher Woods forest preserve in River Forest

River Forest lies along the Des Plaines River to the west and is bordered by Illinois Route 43 to the east and Illinois Route 64 to the north. Along with the Des Plaines River, much of the western boundary of River Forest consists of the Thatcher Woods forest preserve of Cook County and the Des Plaines River Trail. According to the 2010 census, River Forest has a total area of 2.482 square miles (6.43 km^{2}), of which 2.48 square miles (6.42 km^{2}) (or 99.92%) is land and 0.002 square miles (0.01 km^{2}) (or 0.08%) is water.

=== Climate ===
Climate data for River Forest, Illinois
Month	Jan	Feb	Mar	Apr	May	Jun	Jul	Aug	Sep	Oct	Nov	Dec	Year
Mean daily maximum °F (°C)	32 (0)	37.4 (3.0)	48.2 (9.0)	60.8 (16.0)	71.6 (22.0)	80.6 (27.0)	84.2 (29.0)	82.4 (28.0)	77 (25)	62.6 (17.0)	50 (10)	37.4 (3.0)	60.4 (15.8)
Mean daily minimum °F (°C)	19.4 (−7.0)	23 (−5)	32 (0)	41 (5)	51.8 (11.0)	62.6 (17.0)	68 (20)	66.2 (19.0)	59 (15)	46.4 (8.0)	35.6 (2.0)	24.8 (−4.0)	44.2 (6.8)

== Demographics ==
Historical population
Census	Pop.	Note	%±
1900	1,539		—
1910	2,456		59.6%
1920	4,358		77.4%
1930	8,829		102.6%
1940	9,487		7.5%
1950	10,823		14.1%
1960	12,695		17.3%
1970	13,402		5.6%
1980	12,392		−7.5%
1990	11,669		−5.8%
2000	11,635		−0.3%
2010	11,172		−4.0%
2020	11,717		4.9%
U.S. Decennial Census; 2010 2020

=== Racial and ethnic composition ===
River Forest village, Illinois – Racial and ethnic composition Note: the US Census treats Hispanic/Latino as an ethnic category. This table excludes Latinos from the racial categories and assigns them to a separate category. Hispanics/Latinos may be of any race.
Race / Ethnicity (NH = Non-Hispanic)	Pop 2000	Pop 2010	Pop 2020	% 2000	% 2010	% 2020
White alone (NH)	10,084	9,050	8,308	86.67%	81.01%	70.91%
Black or African American alone (NH)	553	733	869	4.75%	6.56%	7.42%
Native American or Alaska Native alone (NH)	9	4	9	0.08%	0.04%	0.08%
Asian alone (NH)	362	505	932	3.11%	4.52%	7.95%
Pacific Islander alone (NH)	5	2	0	0.04%	0.02%	0.00%
Other race alone (NH)	20	38	93	0.17%	0.34%	0.79%
Mixed race or Multiracial (NH)	136	170	515	1.17%	1.52%	4.40%
Hispanic or Latino (any race)	466	670	991	4.01%	6.00%	8.46%
Total	11,635	11,172	11,717	100.00%	100.00%	100.00%

=== 2020 census ===
As of the 2020 census, River Forest had a population of 11,717. The population density was 4,720.79 inhabitants per square mile (1,822.71/km^{2}). There were 4,266 housing units at an average density of 1,718.78 per square mile (663.62/km^{2}).

The median age was 40.1 years. 24.8% of residents were under the age of 18 and 16.8% of residents were 65 years of age or older. For every 100 females there were 90.0 males, and for every 100 females age 18 and over there were 86.5 males age 18 and over.

100.0% of residents lived in urban areas, while 0.0% lived in rural areas.

There were 4,007 households in River Forest, including 2,754 families. Of all households, 38.2% had children under the age of 18 living in them, 59.8% were married-couple households, 11.4% were households with a male householder and no spouse or partner present, and 25.7% were households with a female householder and no spouse or partner present. About 23.7% of all households were made up of individuals, and 12.4% had someone living alone who was 65 years of age or older.

Of all housing units, 6.1% were vacant. The homeowner vacancy rate was 1.8% and the rental vacancy rate was 10.1%.

=== Income and poverty ===
The median income for a household in the village was $125,288, and the median income for a family was $193,171. Males had a median income of $116,643 versus $57,703 for females. The per capita income for the village was $79,929. About 1.3% of families and 2.2% of the population were below the poverty line, including 3.2% of those under age 18 and 1.9% of those age 65 or over.

== Arts and culture ==
The River Forest Public Library is located at 735 Lathrop Avenue.

=== Events ===
River Forest hosted the 2016 Little League Baseball Illinois State Tournament at Keystone Park.

2019 Little League Illinois State Baseball Champions

For the past 24 years, the neighborhood has hosted a yearly 9/11 Lemon-Aid stand on the 700 block of Bonnie Brae which donates all proceeds to local charities. The first year, the event raised $400 for Hepzibah Children's Association. To date, over $707,000 have been donated by the event.

Every year, the Rotary Club of Oak Park River Forest hosts the Food Truck Rally in Keystone Park that donates all net proceeds to local charities. The event includes 10 trucks with sweet, savory, and beer trucks; a live music stage; and a family activities area.

=== Architecture ===
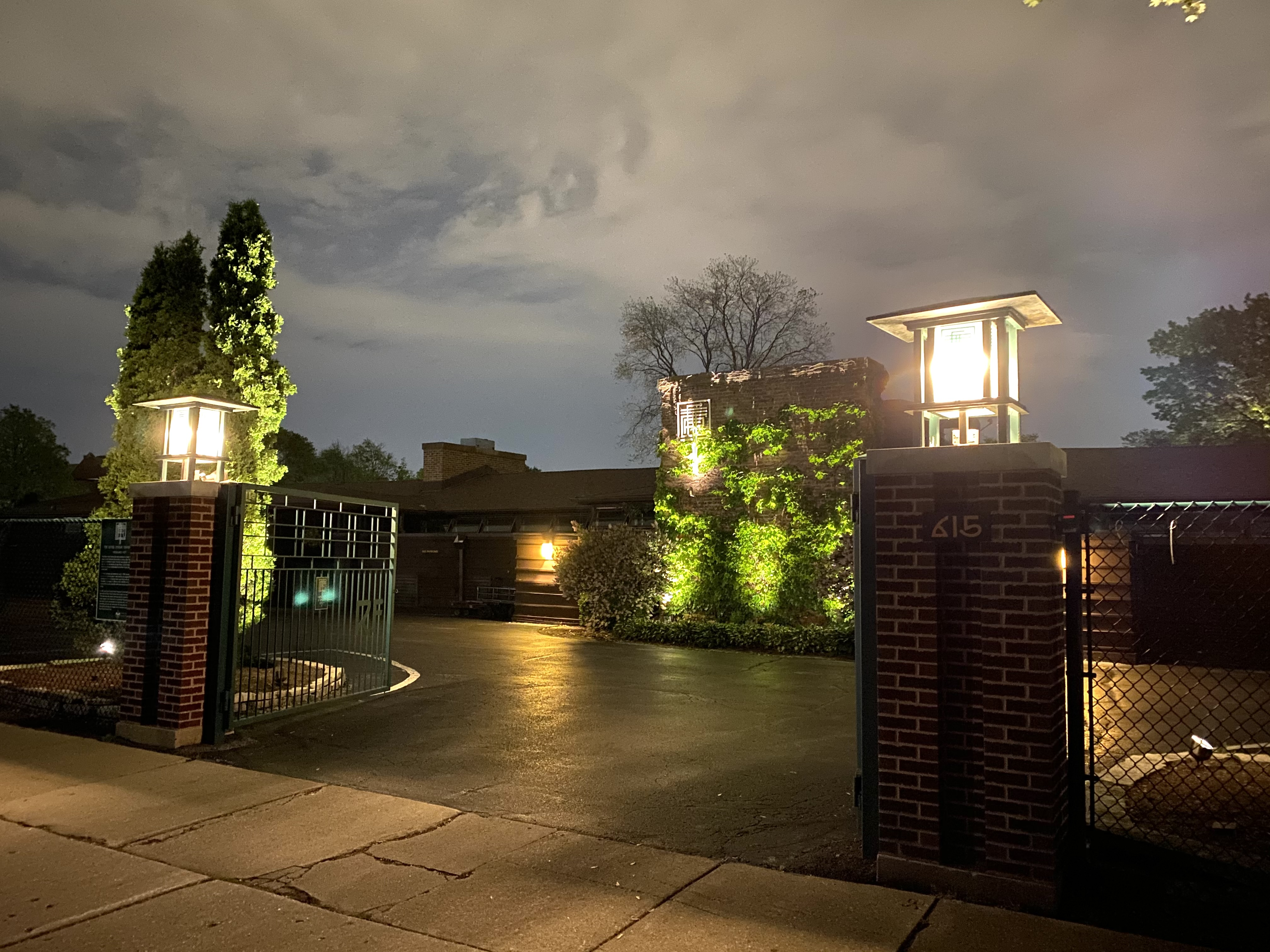
River Forest Tennis Club building designed by Frank Lloyd Wright in River Forest, Illinois

River Forest is perhaps best known for the diversity of early 20th century American residential architectural styles including several Frank Lloyd Wright designs and others within the Prairie School. The Winslow House and the River Forest Tennis Club are most notable for Frank Lloyd Wright's early styles.

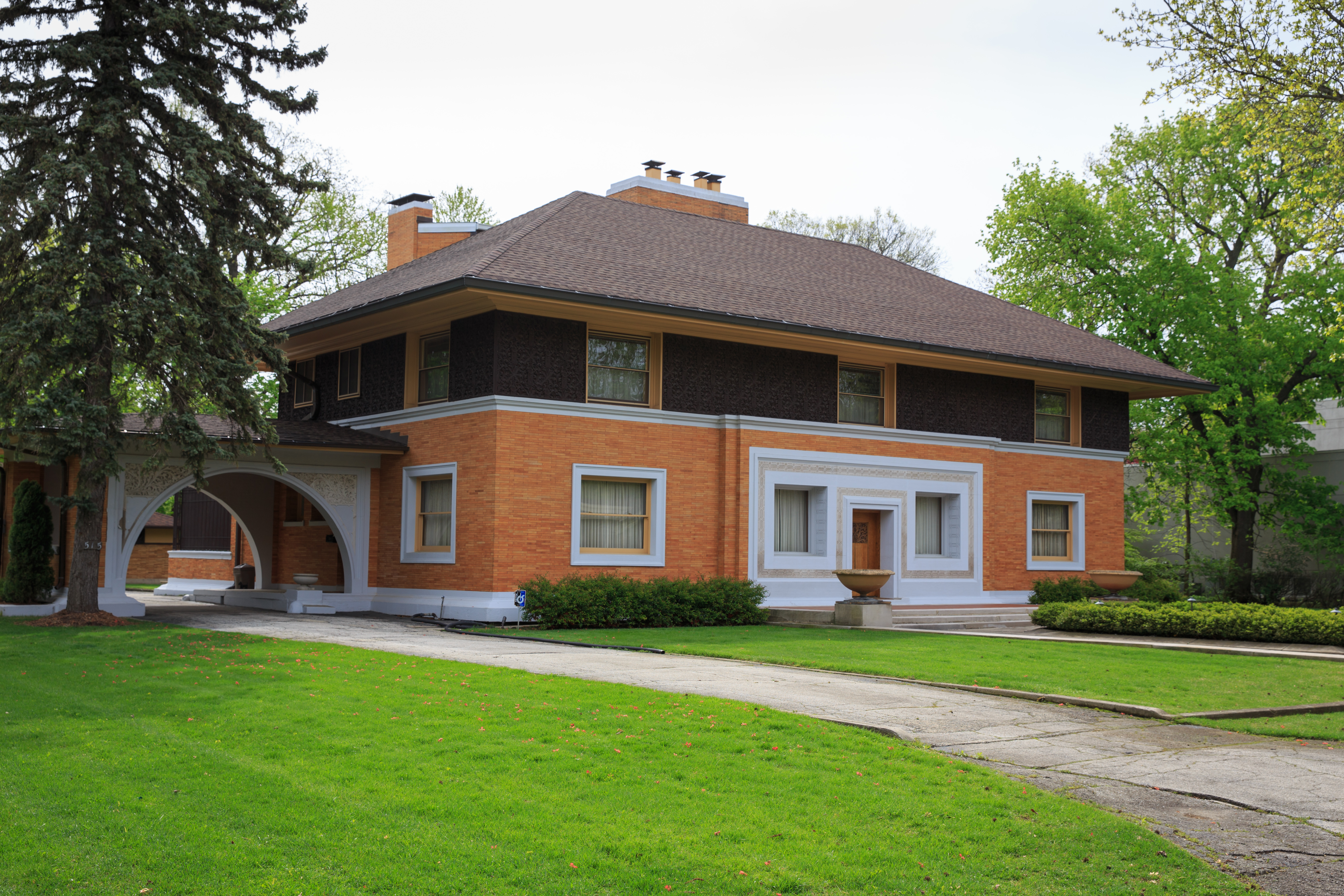
Winslow House designed by Frank Lloyd Wright in River Forest, Illinois

== Government ==
The Village Board is made up of the Village President and six Trustees, who all serve four year terms. The current Village President is Catherine Adduci. The United States Postal Service operates the River Forest Post Office at 401 William Street.

== Education ==
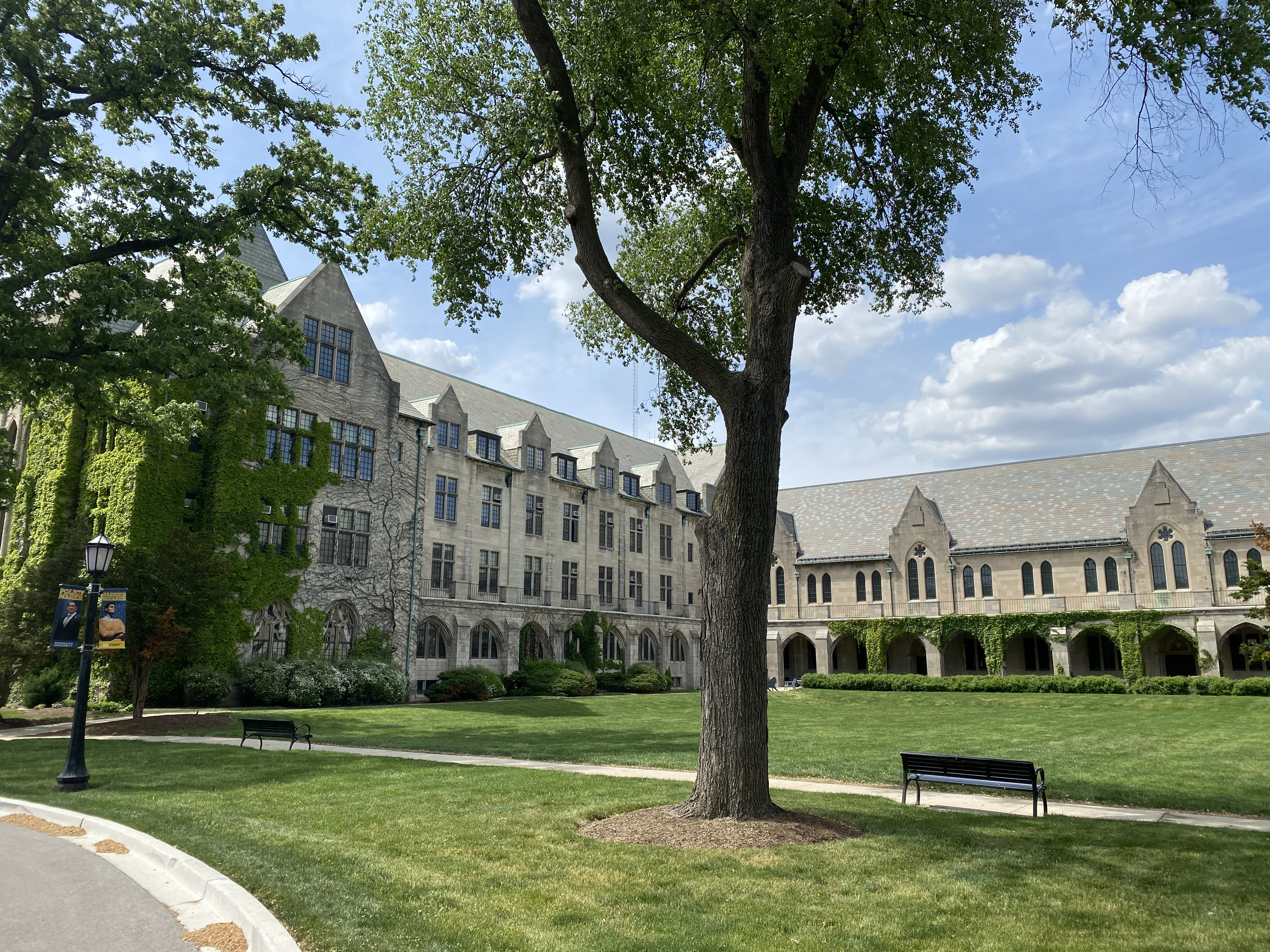
The Dominican University (Illinois) quad along Division Street.

Dominican University and Concordia University Chicago are both located in River Forest.

There are two public elementary schools, Lincoln Elementary School and Willard Elementary School, and one public middle school, Roosevelt Middle School. The elementary and middle schools are in River Forest Public Schools District 90. River Forest shares a high school with Oak Park, known as Oak Park and River Forest High School, located in Oak Park.

River Forest is home to two Catholic grade schools and one Lutheran grade school. St. Luke School and St. Vincent Ferrer School are Catholic schools, and Grace Lutheran School is Lutheran. All three enroll children from 3 years old through eighth grade. River Forest has one all-girls' secondary school, Trinity High School.

River Forest also has the Keystone Montessori School, established in 1994. It serves children 9 months of age to 8th grade as an alternative learning style for children. It educates children using the philosophy of Maria Montessori.

== Infrastructure ==
=== Transportation ===
==== Rail ====
Metra operates a station in River Forest along the Union Pacific West Line at 8001 W. Central Avenue

==== Bus ====
Pace runs routes 309 and 313 along Lake Street through River Forest, stopping a block from the Metra station. Pace also runs routes 307 and 318, with southbound busses driving on North Avenue (318 only) and Harlem Avenue on the edge of River Forest.

== Notable people ==
- Tony Accardo, crime boss
- Anita Alvarez, attorney
- Joseph Andriacchi, mobster
- Charles F. Baumrucker, jeweler, businessman, politician
- James Dewar, inventor
- Paul Harvey, radio commentator
- Sidney Hatch, athlete, US Army Messenger, Recipient of Purple Heart and Distinguished Service Medal, Also Recipient of the Croix De Guerre
- Stacey King, NBA player and announcer for the Chicago Bulls
- Gail Mancuso, television and film director
- Franklin Clarence Mars, inventor
- Kathryn McGee, activist
- Kevin Murphy, actor
- Edwin Perkins, inventor
- Jerry Saltz, art critic
- Anne Smedinghoff, diplomat
- Frances Thielbar, nursing educator

== See also ==
- River Forest Thomism
