= County Road 613 (Indian River County, Florida) =

County road in Indian River County, Florida

County Road 613

Route information
- Length: 11.07 mi (17.82 km)
- Existed: 1988–present

Major junctions
- South end: SR 606 in Vero Beach South
- SR 60 in Vero Beach South
- North end: CR 510 in Wabasso

Location
- Country: United States
- State: Florida
- County: Indian River

Highway system
- County roads in Florida; County roads in Indian River County
← CR 612	→ CR 615

County Road 613 (CR 613), or 58th Avenue, is an 11-mile (18 km) north–south county road in Indian River County, Florida. Opening in 1988, the road serves as an important connection between Sebastian and Vero Beach. CR 613 begins at CR 606 (Oslo Road) near Vero Beach South and ends in Wabasso at CR 510.

The county road is former State Road 505A (SR 50A). GoLine, the public bus service of Indian River County, services CR 613 with Route 9.

== Route description ==
=== Vero Beach South ===
CR 613 begins at Oslo Road (CR 606) near Vero Beach South. The intersection marks the start of the Oslo Exchange project. Heading north, CR 613 crosses 8th Street (CR 612), where many new residential communities are currently under construction. CR 613 provides access to the Indian River State College Mueller campus and the Brackett Library (located in West Vero Corridor) at its intersection with College Lane.

At its intersection with SR 60, access to the Indian River Mall and shopping centers is provided. Just after SR 60, CR 613 narrows from four to two lanes. CR 613 divides West Vero Corridor and Vero Beach South in this area.

=== Gifford and Winter Beach ===
In Gifford, CR 613 intersects 41st Street (CR 630) which provides access to the Indian River County Jail. Between 49th and 53rd streets along CR 613, a project to create a new mixed-use area has been proposed. CR 613 between 49th and 57th streets was widened in 2019 to support growth in the area, costing $3,000,000.

CR 613 intersects two county roads in Winter Beach, CR 508 (69th Street) and CR 632 (65th Street).

=== Wabasso ===
The intersection of 77th Street and CR 613 in Wabasso is the location of the Indian River County Fairgrounds. At CR 510 in Wabasso, CR 613 ends. FDOT has begun conducting a PD&E study at the to improve the intersection of CR 510 and CR 613.

== Major intersections ==
The entire route is in Indian River County.

Location	mi	km	Destinations	Notes
Vero Beach South	0.00	0.00	SR 606 (Oslo Road) to I-95 / US 1	Southern terminus
Vero Beach South	2.02	3.25	CR 612 east (8th Street) to CR 611	
Vero Beach South	3.54	5.70	SR 60 (20th Street) to I-95 – Indian River Mall	
Gifford	5.55	8.93	CR 630 (41st Street)	S Gifford Road
Gifford	5.55	8.93	(53rd Street) to CR 603	
Winter Beach	8.56	13.78	CR 632 (65th Street)	
Winter Beach	9.07	14.60	CR 508 (Winter Beach Road) to CR 619	Signed locally as 69th Street
Wabasso	11.07	17.82	CR 510 (Wabasso Road) to SR A1A / US 1 / SR 510 east / I-95	Northern terminus, signed as 85th street
1.000 mi = 1.609 km; 1.000 km = 0.621 mi
