= List of county roads in Indian River County, Florida =

- County road shields used in Florida

Highway names
- Interstates: Interstate X (I-X)
- US Highways: U.S. Highway X (US X)
- State: State Road X (SR X)
- County: County Road X (CR X)

System links
- County roads in Florida; County roads in Indian River County

The following is a list of county roads in Indian River County, Florida. All county roads are maintained by the county in which they reside.

== County roads in Indian River County ==
Route	Road Name(s)	From	To	Notes
CR 5A	Old Dixie Highway	US 1 (SR 5) / 38 Lane in Gifford	US 1 (SR 5) / 85 Place in Wabasso	Former SR 5A
CR 505	Roseland Road	CR 512 / Roseland Road in Sebastian	US 1 (SR 5) / Roseland Road in Roseland	Former SR 505
CR 507	North Broadway Street; South Carolina Avenue	CR 512 / South Broadway Street in Fellsmere	CR 507 at the Brevard County line north-northwest of Fellsmere	Former SR 507
CR 508	69 Street	CR 619 west of Winter Beach	US 1 (SR 5) / 69 Street in Winter Beach	Former SR 508
CR 510	85 Street	CR 512 / Watervliet Avenue	US 1 (SR 5) / SR 510 in Wabasso	Former SR 510
CR 512	Sebastian Boulevard	SR 60 at the Blue Cypress Recreation Area west of West Vero Corridor	US 1 (SR 5) / Sebastian Boulevard in Sebastian	Former SR 512
CR 603	Indian River Boulevard; 53rd Street	US 1 (SR 5) / 4 Street in Vero Beach South	US 1 (SR 5) / 53rd Street in Gifford	Brief concurrency with SR 60 in Vero Beach
CR 605	Old Dixie Highway	CR 605 at the St. Lucie County line on the Lakewood Park–Florida Ridge line	Old Dixie Highway on the Vero Beach South–Vero Beach line	Former SR 605
CR 611	43rd Avenue	CR 603 / 25th Street SW at the St. Lucie County line on the Lakewood Park–Florida Ridge line	43 Avenue / 14 Street	former SR 611 (which also included 45th Street)
CR 612	8th Street	CR 613 / 8th Street in Vero Beach South	US 1 (SR 5) / 8th Street in Vero Beach South	Former SR 612
CR 613	58th Avenue	CR 606 / 58th Avenue southwest of Vero Beach South	CR 510 / 58th Avenue in Wabasso	Former SR 505A
CR 615	66th Avenue	SR 60 / 66th Avenue in West Vero Corridor	US-1 in Sebastian	Former SR 505
CR 619	82nd Avenue; Ranch Road	CR 606 west of Florida Ridge	CR 508 west of Winter Beach	Former SR 609
CR 630	41st Street	CR 615 / 41st Street west of Gifford	Park View Terrace / Oakmont Court in Gifford	Former SR 630
CR 632	65 Street	CR 615 west of Winter Beach	US 1 (SR 5) / Antilles Lane in Winter Beach	Former SR 632
