= County Road 615 (Indian River County, Florida) =

County road in Indian River County, Florida

County Road 615

Route information
- Length: 10.72 mi (17.25 km)
- Existed: 1951–present

Major junctions
- South end: SR 60 in West Vero Corridor
- CR 510 in Wabasso
- North end: US 1 in Sebastian

Location
- Country: United States
- State: Florida
- County: Indian River

Highway system
- County roads in Florida; County roads in Indian River County
← CR 613	→ CR 619

County Road 615 (CR 615), 66th Avenue, or Schumann Drive in Sebastian, is a 10.7-mile (17.2 km) major north–south county road in Indian River County, Florida. Starting at State Road 60 (SR 60) in West Vero Corridor, CR 615 heads north until eventually ending at CR 510 in Wabasso. The county road was built in 1951.

CR 615 mainly passes through rural areas in Indian River County.

== Route description ==
CR 615 begins at SR 60 (20th Street) in West Vero Corridor. The county road heads north, intersecting CR 630 (41st Street) in Gifford. In Winter Beach, CR 615 intersects CR 632 (65th Street) and CR 508 (69th Street), then narrows to two lanes. Finally, CR 615 ends at CR 510 in Wabasso.

== Future ==
Since 2021, a project to improve CR 615 has taken place. Phase 1, spanning from 49th Street to CR 508 (69th Street), finished in late 2024. Phase 1 included adding traffic lights at 53rd Street and CR 508 (69th Street), with improvements to the traffic light at 57th Street. Phase 1 involved widening CR 615 from two to four lanes. Phase 2, spanning from CR 508 to CR 510, is under construction. CR 615 will be widened from two to four lanes, and a traffic circle will be constructed at the intersection with CR 510. The total cost for both phases is $48,436,408.

== Major Intersections ==
The entire route is in Indian River County.

Location	mi	km	Destinations	Notes
West Vero Corridor	0.00	0.00	SR 60 (20th Street) to I-95 – Indian River Mall	Southern terminus
Gifford	2.01	3.23	CR 630 east (41st Street)	
Winter Beach	5.0	8.0	CR 632 east (65th Street)	
Winter Beach	5.45	8.77	CR 508 (69th Street)	Winter Beach Rd
Wabasso	7.6	12.2	CR 510 (Wabasso Road) to I-95 / US 1 / SR A1A / SR 510 east / SR 512	
Sebastian	10.72	17.25	US 1 (SR 5)	Northern terminus
1.000 mi = 1.609 km; 1.000 km = 0.621 mi
