= County Road 510 (Indian River County, Florida) =

County road in Indian River County, Florida

County Road 510
- SR 510 in red, CR 510 in pink

Route information
- Maintained by Indian River County
- Length: 5.88 mi (9.46 km)

Major junctions
- North end: SR 512 / CR 512 in Sebastian
- East end: US 1 / SR 510 in Wabasso

Location
- Country: United States
- State: Florida
- County: Indian River

Highway system
- County roads in Florida; County roads in Indian River County
← CR 508	→ CR 512

County Road 510 (CR 510), or Wabasso Road, is a 5.88-mile (9.46 km) major east–west county road in Indian River County, Florida. CR 510 connects Interstate 95 (I-95) with beach access via the State Road 510 (SR 510) causeway. A project to create an overpass over U.S. Highway 1 (US 1) to SR 510 is currently being proposed to reduce congestion.

In 2026, the highway will be redesignated and replaced as an extension of SR 510 when the roadway is transferred to the Florida Department of Transportation (FDOT).

== Route description ==
CR 510 begins in southern Sebastian, near Vero Lake Estates and I-95. The road continues south, before curving outside of Vero Lake Estates. At the intersection of CR 615 (66th Avenue), a traffic circle is to be constructed. CR 510 intersects with CR 613 (58th Avenue), before ending at the intersection of CR 5A, SR 5, SR 510, and US 1.

== Future ==
CR 510 is a site of major congestion in Indian River County, as it connects the I-95 corridor and northern Indian River County to Disney's Vero Beach Resort and beaches via SR 510. An overpass over US 1 connecting CR 510 to SR 510 is currently in the planning stages as part of the county's long transportation plan. According to TCPalm, the project, if built, will be completed by 2040.

== Major intersections ==
Location	mi	km	Destinations	Notes
Sebastian	0.000	0.000	SR 512 west (Fellsmere Road) / CR 512 east to I-95 / US 1	Western terminus
	2.231	3.590	CR 619 south (82nd Avenue)	Future northern terminus of 82nd Avenue
Sebastian	4.202	6.762	CR 615 (Schumann Drive / 66th Avenue)	
Wabasso	5.240	8.433	CR 613 south (58th Avenue)	Northern terminus of CR 613
Wabasso	5.881	9.465	US 1 / CR 5A south (Old Dixie Highway) / SR 510 east to SR A1A	Eastern terminus of CR 510; continues east as SR 510; proposed compact diamond interchange
1.000 mi = 1.609 km; 1.000 km = 0.621 mi: Route transition
