= Florida State Road 512 =

State road in Indian River County, Florida

State Road 512 and County Road 512
- SR 512 in red, CR 512 in pink

Route information
- Maintained by FDOT and Indian River County
- Length: 19.74 mi (31.77 km) 2.635 miles (4.241 km) as SR 512

Major junctions
- South end: SR 60 in Vero Beach
- I-95 (SR 9) in Fellsmere; CR 510 in Sebastian
- East end: US 1 in Sebastian

Location
- Country: United States
- State: Florida
- County: Indian River

Highway system
- Florida State Highway System; Interstate; US; State; Former; Pre‑1945; Toll; Scenic
← SR 510	→ SR 513

State Road 512 (SR 512), or Sebastian Boulevard east of Interstate 95 (I-95), is a 2.6-mile (4.2 km) major east–west county road in northern Indian River County, Florida. The highway serves as one of two current I-95 exits in the county. SR 512 connects Indian River County’s largest city, Sebastian, to I-95. To the east and west of the state controlled portions, the road is designated as County Road 512. The highway acts as main artery in Fellsmere, where it passes through its downtown as Pennsylvania Avenue.

SR 512 serves a vital role for the connectivity of the city of Fellsmere. According to TCPalm, during hurricane evacuations the road is especially important because it is one of two roads to enter and leave the city. During Hurricane Milton in October 2024, a culvert collapsed, causing SR 512 to be impassable until January 2025.

On September 14, 2026, a 2.6-mile portion of the highway between I-95 and CR 510 was redesignated State Road 512 (SR 512) when the roadway was transferred to the Florida Department of Transportation (FDOT).

== Route description ==
CR 512 starts at SR 60 near Blue Cypress Lake west of Vero Beach. It continues northward towards Fellsmere before turning northeast towards downtown Fellsmere. CR 512 then shifts east at CR 507, before its interchange with I-95, where its destination becomes SR 512. Finally, at CR 510, state designation ends, and CR 512 shifts northeast intersecting CR 505 in Sebastian. Near Delaware avenue in Sebastian, CR 512 splits into two one-way branches before intersecting and ending at US 1.

== Major intersections ==
The entire route is in Indian River County.

Location	mi	km	Destinations	Notes
	0.000	0.000	SR 60 to Florida's Turnpike / US 441 / I-95	Western terminus, located near Blue Cypress Lake
Fellsmere	10.09	16.24	CR 507 north (Broadway Street) to SR 507 – St. Sebastian River Preserve State Park	
Fellsmere	13.16	21.18	I-95 (SR 9) – Daytona Beach, West Palm Beach	Diamond interchange; Exit 156 on I-95; west end of state maintenance
Sebastian	15.61	25.12	CR 510 east (Wabasso Road) to SR A1A / US 1 / SR 510 east – Vero Lake Estates, Sebastian River High School	East end of state maintenance
Sebastian	16.02	25.78	South Prong of St. Sebastian River	
Sebastian	16.88	27.17	CR 505 north (Roseland Road) to US 1 – Orlando Health Sebastian River Hospital, North County Library, Sebastian Municipal Airport, Roseland Historic District	
Sebastian	17.97	28.92	Fleming Street to Main Street - Sebastian Municipal Airport, Sebastian City Hall, Sebastian Historical Society Museum	
Sebastian	19.03	30.63	Highway splits into two one way pairs	
Sebastian	19.74	31.77	US 1 (SR 5) – Riverview Park	Eastern terminus located in Downtown Sebastian
1.000 mi = 1.609 km; 1.000 km = 0.621 mi: Route transition
