= Florida State Road 510 =

State highway in Florida, United States

State Road 510
- SR 510 in red, CR 510 in pink

Route information
- Maintained by FDOT
- Length: 2.606 mi (4.194 km)

Major junctions
- West end: US 1 / CR 510 in Wabasso
- East end: SR A1A in Wabasso Beach

Location
- Country: United States
- State: Florida
- Counties: Indian River

Highway system
- Florida State Highway System; Interstate; US; State; Former; Pre‑1945; Toll; Scenic
← SR 508	→ SR 512

State Road 510 (SR 510) is a 2.606-mile-long (4.194 km) state highway in northern Indian River County, extending from U.S. Route 1 (US 1) in Wabasso to SR A1A in Wabasso Beach. The route acts primarily as a bridge across the Indian River, known as the Wabasso Causeway, the northernmost crossing of the Intracoastal Waterway in Indian River County. The entire highway is on the Indian River Lagoon Scenic Highway.

In 2026, the highway will be extended when CR-510 roadway is transferred to the Florida Department of Transportation (FDOT).

== Route description ==
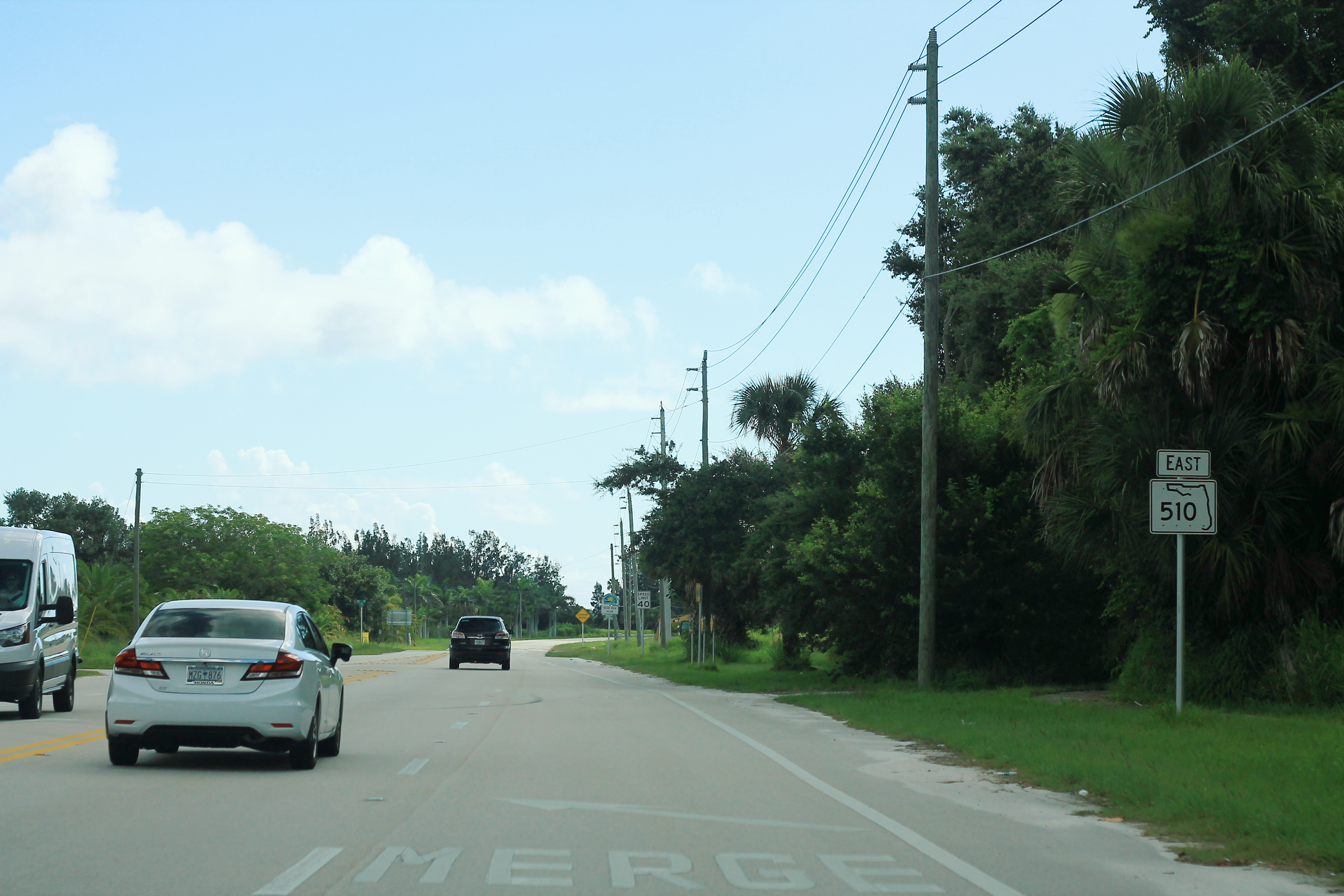
A sign for Florida State Road 510 in Wabasso.

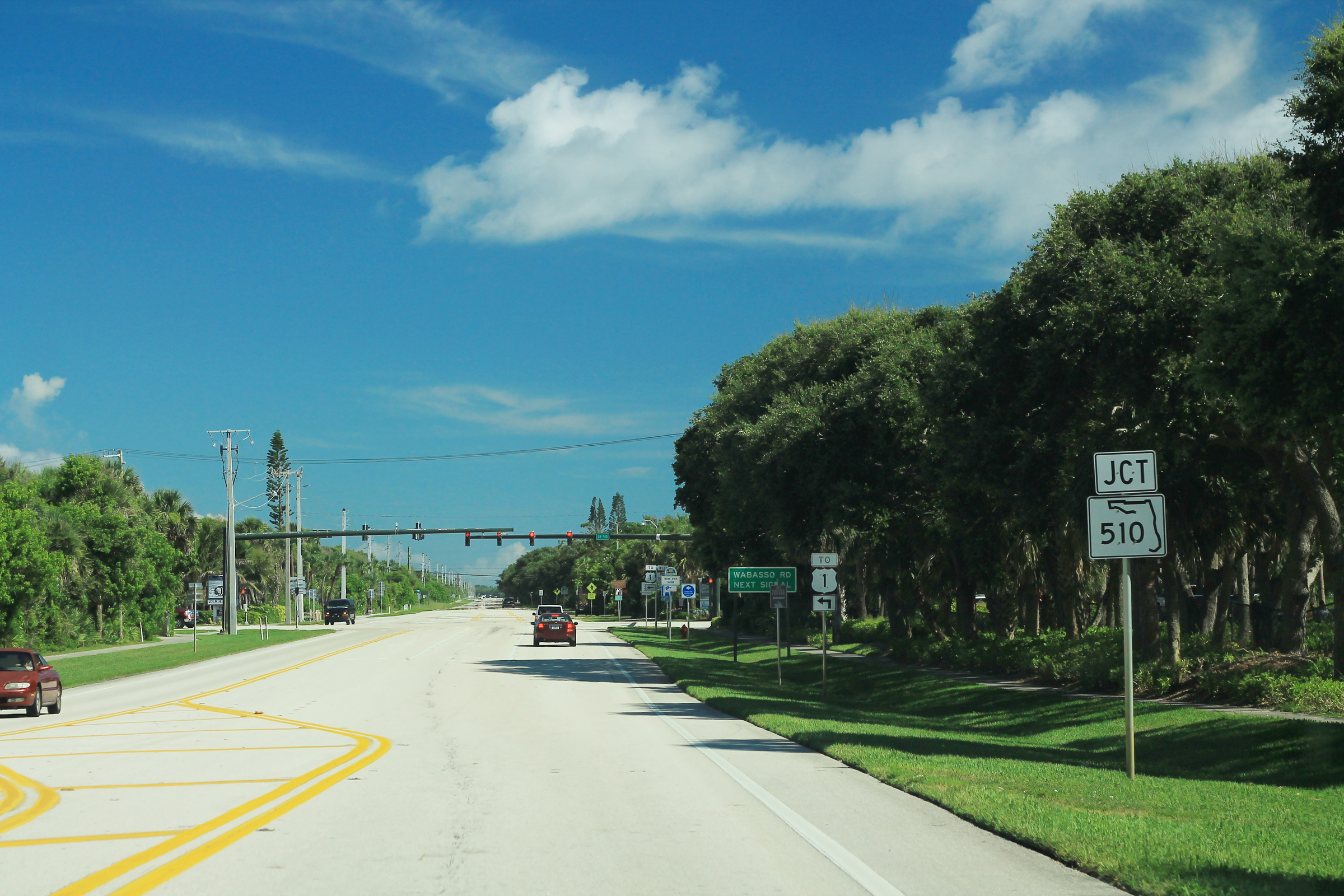
Florida State Road 510's terminus at northbound State Road A1A.

State Road 510 begins in Wabasso at US 1, and travels northeast towards the Indian River Lagoon. It crosses the Lagoon on two bridges, with Marshall Island, providing access to an environmental learning center in between the two bridges. East of the river, SR 510 enters Wabasso Beach and heads east towards its eastern terminus of State Road A1A, one block west of the beach. The Indian River Lagoon Scenic Highway turns north on A1A until Cape Canaveral. The entire road is only 2 lanes wide, even at the causeway.

=== County Road 510 ===
County Road 510 extends from CR 512 to US 1, providing access to farmlands south of Sebastian.

Starting its 8.4 miles (13.5 km) at CR 512 at Vero Lake Estates, the road begins as a north-south route for 1.2 miles (2 km) as 90th Avenue, then turns east to Wabasso as Wabasso Road. After 70th Avenue, it intersects with a major junction called County Road 615. 1 mile (1.6 km) east of this point is County Road 613, 0.5 miles (0.8 km) east of that point is County Road 605 in Wabasso. A block east of the road is US 1, ending CR 510. That section of Wabasso Road ends at 108th Avenue. For more information, see Wabasso Road West.

== Major intersections ==
The entire route is in Indian River County.

Location	mi	km	Destinations	Notes
Wabasso	0.000	0.000	US 1 (SR 5) / CR 510 west to I-95	
	1.338– 1.659	2.153– 2.670	Wabasso Bridge over Indian River (Atlantic Intracoastal Waterway)	
Orchid	2.129	3.426	Jungle Trail	
Wabasso Beach	2.606	4.194	SR A1A	
1.000 mi = 1.609 km; 1.000 km = 0.621 mi
