= Indian River Lagoon Scenic Highway =

Route information
- Length: 130 mi (210 km)

Location
- Country: United States
- State: Florida

Highway system
- Florida State Highway System; Interstate; US; State; Former; Pre‑1945; Toll; Scenic

The Indian River Lagoon Scenic Highway is a 130-mile-long (210 km) scenic byway located in Florida. The highway is a collection of several roads, running north and south along either side of the Indian River Lagoon, connected by other roads running over the Lagoon.

== Route overview ==
The two main north–south roads are:

- US 1 along the western side of the Lagoon
- A1A, and State Road 3 along the eastern side of the Lagoon

The east west connectors are, from north to south:

- State Road 402, Playalinda Beach Road, at the northernmost reach of the Lagoon. This road deadends.
- State Road 405 connecting US 1 to State Road 3

The remainder of the east–west roads connect US 1 to A1A:

- State Road 528
- State Road 520
- State Road 404 over the Pineda
- The Eau Gallie Causeway (State Road 518)
- The Melbourne Causeway (U.S. Highway 192)
- The Wabasso Causeway at the south end of the Lagoon

== Detailed description ==
County Road 402
- Location: Brevard County
- Length: 10.6 mi (17.1 km)

County Road 515
- Location: Brevard County

The north end starts at the eastern terminus of CR 402, Kennedy Parkway inside the Kennedy Space Center. It turns west toward Historic Downtown Titusville. At the other end of CR 402, the road turns southward to U.S. Route 1. 12 miles (19 km) south of Downtown Titusville, the scenic byway meets CR 515, part of the Indian River Lagoon Scenic Highway. After the southern terminus of CR 515, it passes Pineda, Palm Shores, Melbourne, Palm Bay, Grant-Valkaria, Barefoot Bay, Micco, Roseland, Sebastian, and Wabasso. At SR 510 in Wabasso, the byway turns eastward on the Wabasso Causeway to Orchid to State Road A1A and then north. Several places along the way are: Windsor, Sebastian Inlet State Park, Melbourne Beach, Indialantic, Melbourne, Indian Harbor Beach, Satellite Beach, Patrick Space Force Base, Cocoa Beach, and Cape Canaveral.

State Road 528 begins at Cape Canaveral as the Emory L. Bennett Causeway and heads to the southern terminus of the road. It goes over State Road 3 in Merritt Island, and finally, it ends at U.S. Route 1 in Cocoa (also the west end of the Emory L. Bennett Causeway.

== See also ==
- U.S. Route 1
- State Road A1A
- Indian River Lagoon
