= County Road 515 =

County Road 515 or County Route 515 may refer to:

- County Route 515 (California)
- County Road 515 (Brevard County, Florida)
- County Route 515 (New Jersey)
