= GoLine =

Bus system in Indian River County, Florida

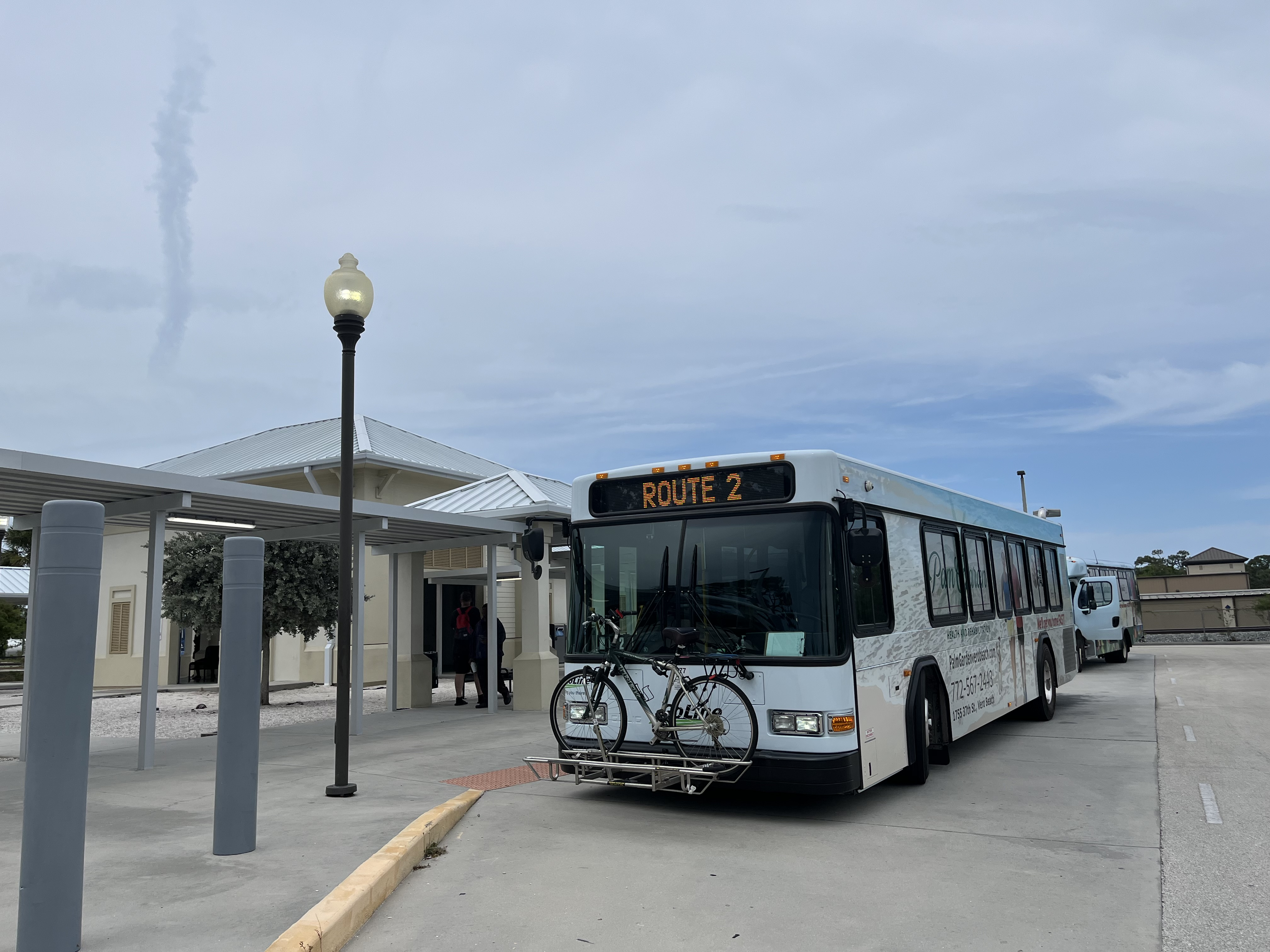
- Route 2 bus at the main transit hub in Vero Beach in May 2025

Overview
- Owner: Indian River County
- Transit type: Bus System
- Number of lines: 15
- Number of stations: 504 total
- Daily ridership: 5,400 (2025)

Operation
- Began operation: 1992
- Operators: Senior Resource Association, Indian River County transit
- Number of vehicles: 23

GoLine is the free public bus system of Indian River County, Florida. The system opened in 1992 as the Community Transportation Coordinator (CTC). Since then, GoLine has grown to serve 1.35 million passengers during the 2023-2024 fiscal year.

According to Business View magazine, there are currently 504 permanent stops across Indian River County. The main transit hub was constructed in 2017. Since 1992, the Senior Resource Association has operated GoLine.

== History ==
=== Founding and expansions ===
GoLine was founded in 1992 and opened in 1994 when fixed route bus service was introduced to meet the growing population of Indian River County.

In the early 2000s, Indian River Transit created several routes within Vero Beach and Sebastian with a connection to Barefoot Bay in neighboring Micco.

In 2006, Indian River Transit rebranded to GoLine.

=== Transit hub construction ===
In 2017, the relocation of the main transit hub on 16th street in Vero Beach was completed, creating a modern terminal where 6 lines currently terminate.

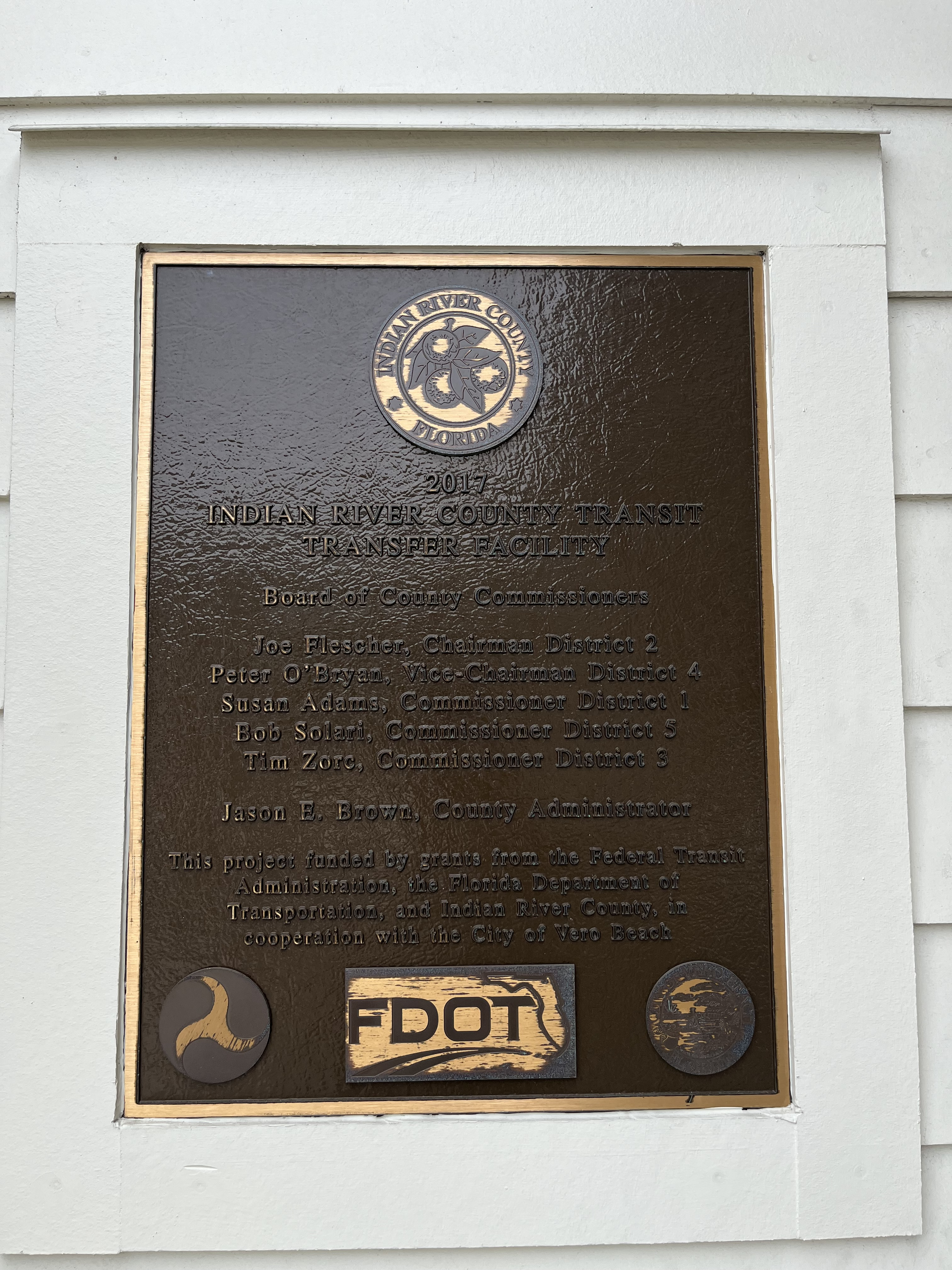
FDOT plaque at main transit hub

The south county transit hub opened in April 2017 to expand the GoLine connectivity in Vero Beach South and Florida Ridge. The site of the transit hub is the Intergenerational (IG) Recreation Center.

=== Partnerships and awards ===
==== Awards ====
The GoLine system has received many awards. In 2011, 2016, 2018, and 2022 GoLine won urban community transportation coordinator of the year for the state of Florida. The GoLine won national urban system of the year award in 2018. Several other awards were granted as well.

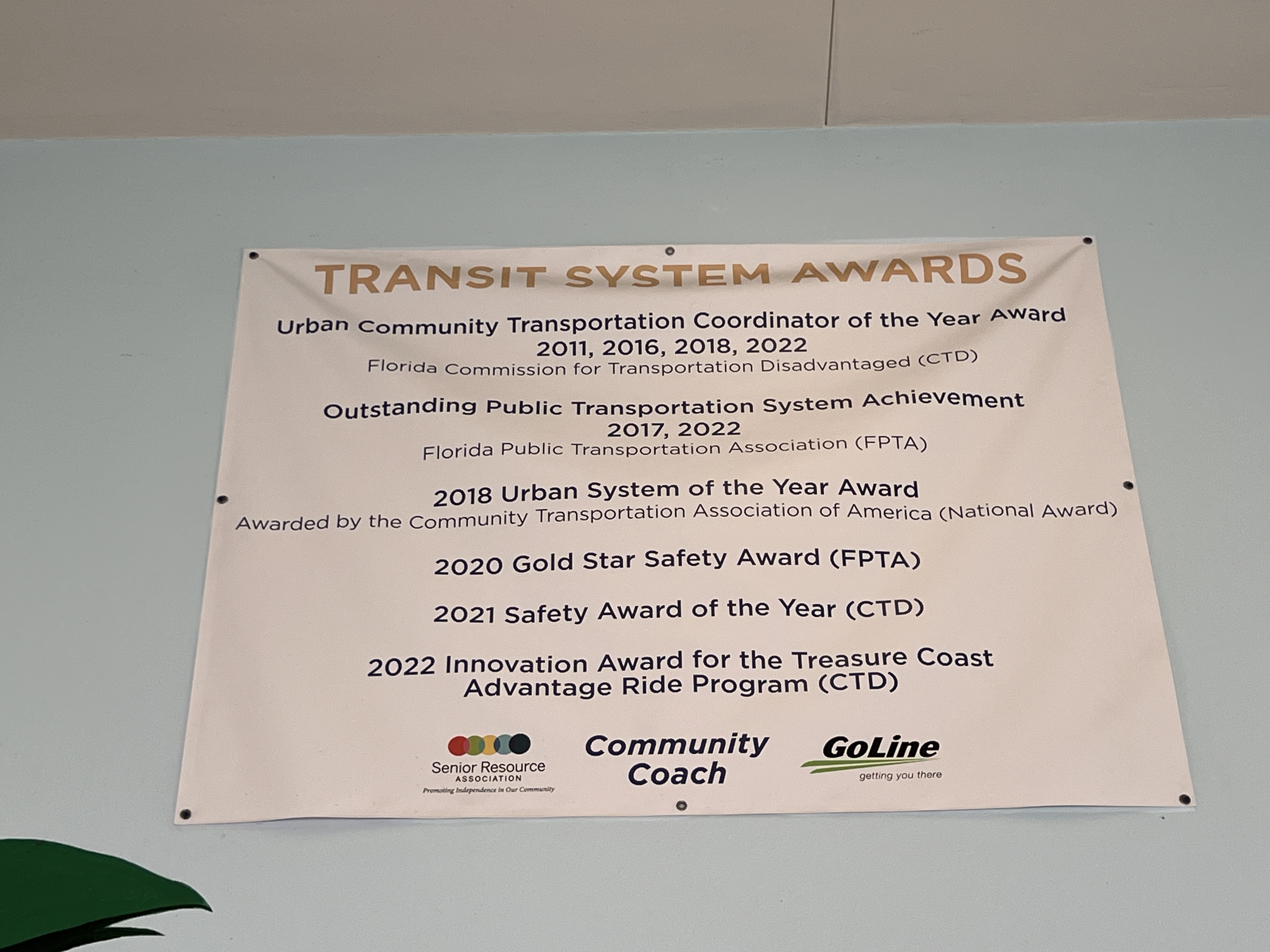
GoLine System Awards, as displayed in the main transit hub

==== Partnerships ====
Beginning in May 2024, the GoLine partnered with the senior bus service, community coach, to make the network more accessible to seniors in Indian River County.

During Hurricane Milton, GoLine partnered with Indian River County Emergency Management Services to provide access to hurricane shelters.

A February 2025 article by the Florida Department of Transportation (FDOT) ranked the system as the most efficient in the state.

== Routes ==
GoLine operates 15 routes in Indian River County, from Indian River County Main Transit hub, South County Transit Hub, and North County Transit Hub. GoLine is open Monday through Friday.

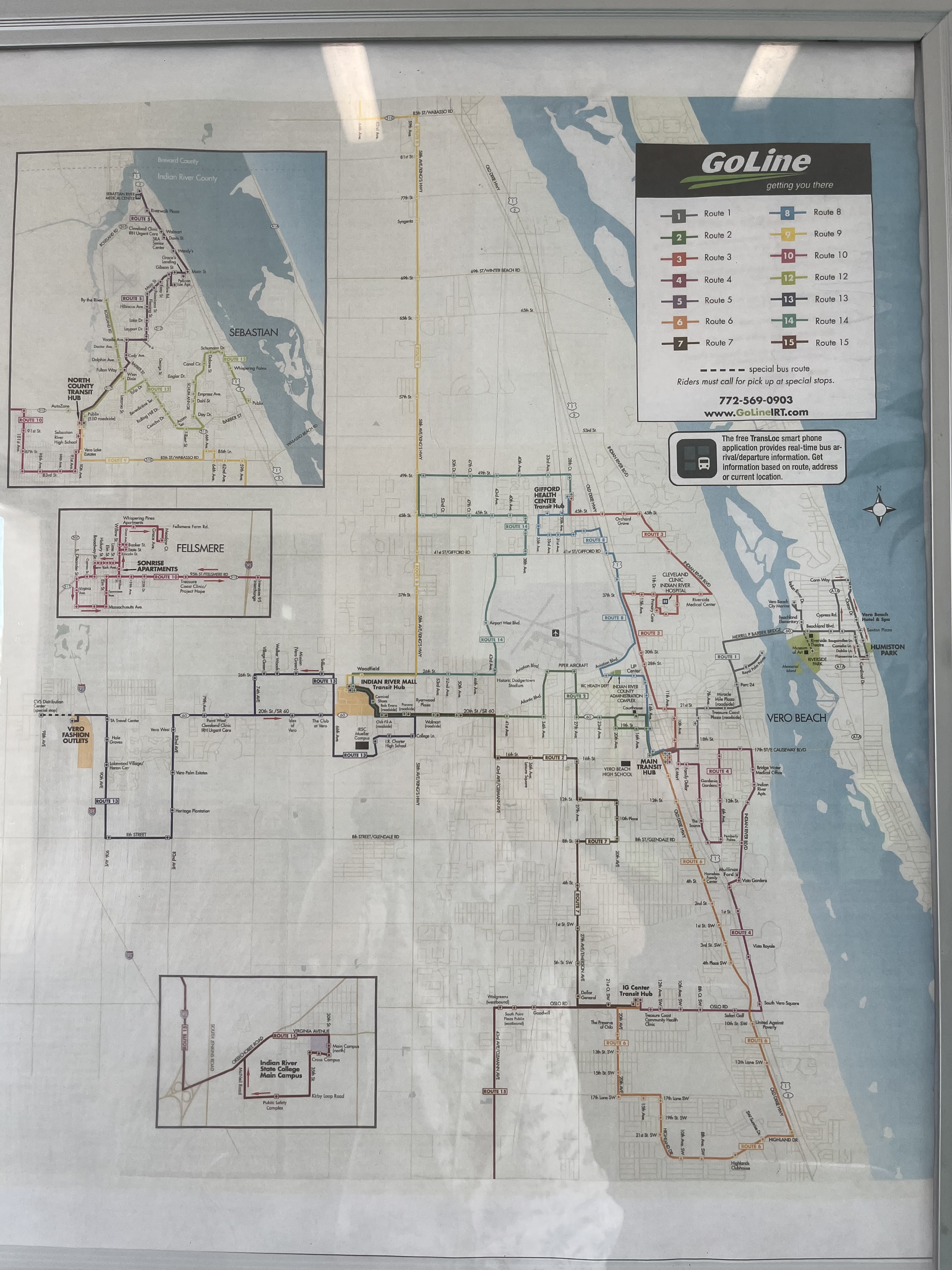
Route Map of GoLine at the main transit hub

Link to details about GoLine including route maps, schedules and information.

=== Route list ===
==== Route 1 ====
Serves 29 stops from the Beachside to Main Transit Hub

==== Route 2 ====
Serves 29 stops from The Indian River Mall to Vero Beach Regional Airport to Main Transit Hub

==== Route 3 ====
Serves 33 stops from Gifford Health Center to Cleveland Clinic Indian River Hospital to Main Transit Hub

==== Route 4 ====
Serves 46 stops from IG center to Florida Ridge to Main Transit Hub

==== Route 5 ====
Serves 40 stops from Sebastian Medical Center to North County Transit Hub

==== Route 6 ====
Serves 48 stops from IG center to Highlands (Florida Ridge) to Main Transit Hub

==== Route 7 ====
Serves 33 stops from IG center to the Indian River Mall

==== Route 8 ====
Serves 34 stops from Gifford Health Center to Main Transit Hub

==== Route 9 ====
Serves 37 stops from North County Transit Hub to the Indian River Mall

==== Route 10 ====
Serves 49 stops from Fellsmere to North County Transit Hub

==== Route 11 ====
Serves 35 stops from the Main Transit Hub to Sebastian River Medical Center

==== Route 12 ====
Serves 42 stops from Sebastian to North County Transit Hub

==== Route 13 ====
Serves 39 stops from the Indian River Mall to Vero Beach Outlets

==== Route 14 ====
Serves 40 stops from Gifford Health Center to the Indian River Mall

==== Route 15 ====
Serves 9 stops from IG center to Indian River State College (Ft. Pierce)

==== Route 16 ====
Serves 9 stops from IG center to North County Transit Hub. Morning and evening service weekdays only

== Fleet ==
=== Fleet ===
Fleet numbers	Build Date	Photos	Manufacturer	Model	Engine	Transmission
232	2013		Gillig	Low Floor 29'	Cummins ISL9	Allison B400R
233-234	2013		Gillig	Low Floor 35'	Cummins ISL9	Allison B400R
241-242	2016		Gillig	Low Floor 29'	Cummins ISL9	Allison B400R
245	2017		Gillig	Low Floor 29'	Cummins L9	Allison B400R
246-248	2016		Ford	E450	Ford Triton V10 6.8L gasoline	
249-250	2016		Ford	F550	Ford Triton V10 6.8L gasoline	
253-255	2018		Freightliner	S2 35'	Cummins L9	Allison 2500 PTS
263	2019		Freightliner	S2 35'	Cummins L9	Allison 2500 PTS
266-268	2021		Freightliner	S2 29'	Cummins B6.7	Allison 2100 PTS
269-270	2022		Freightliner	S2 35'	Cummins L9	Allison 2500 PTS
276-277	2024		Gillig	Low floor 35'	Cummins L9	Allison B400R
278	2025		Gillig	Low floor 29'	Cummins L9	Allison B400R
284-286	2026		Freightliner	S2 29'		

=== Facilities ===
The main transit hub in Vero Beach includes six permanent bus ports for routes 1, 2, 3, 4, 6, and 8, and a limited stop for route 11. The station also includes outdoor and indoor waiting areas with restrooms as well. Two vending machines are available for guests.

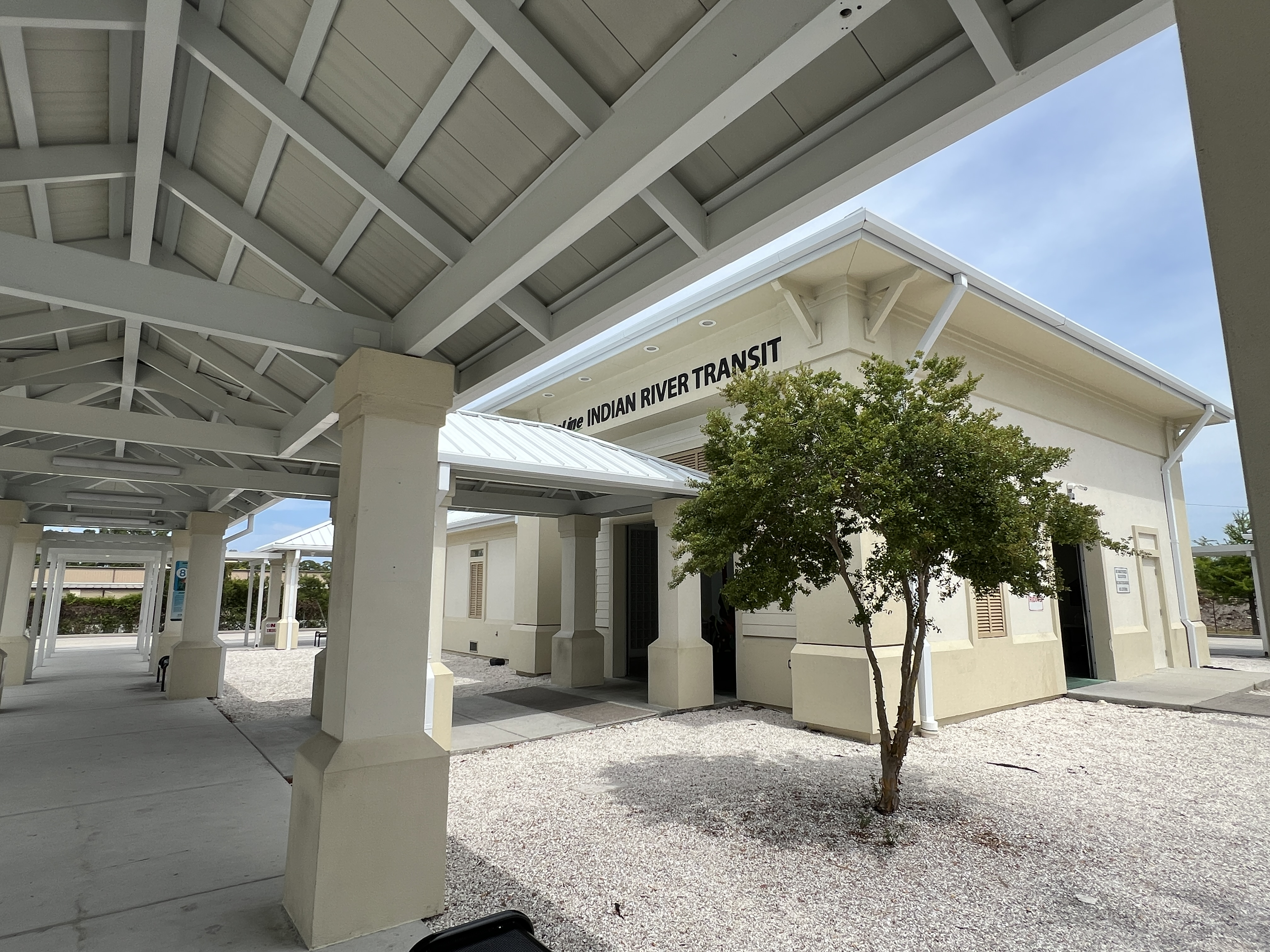
Main Transit Hub

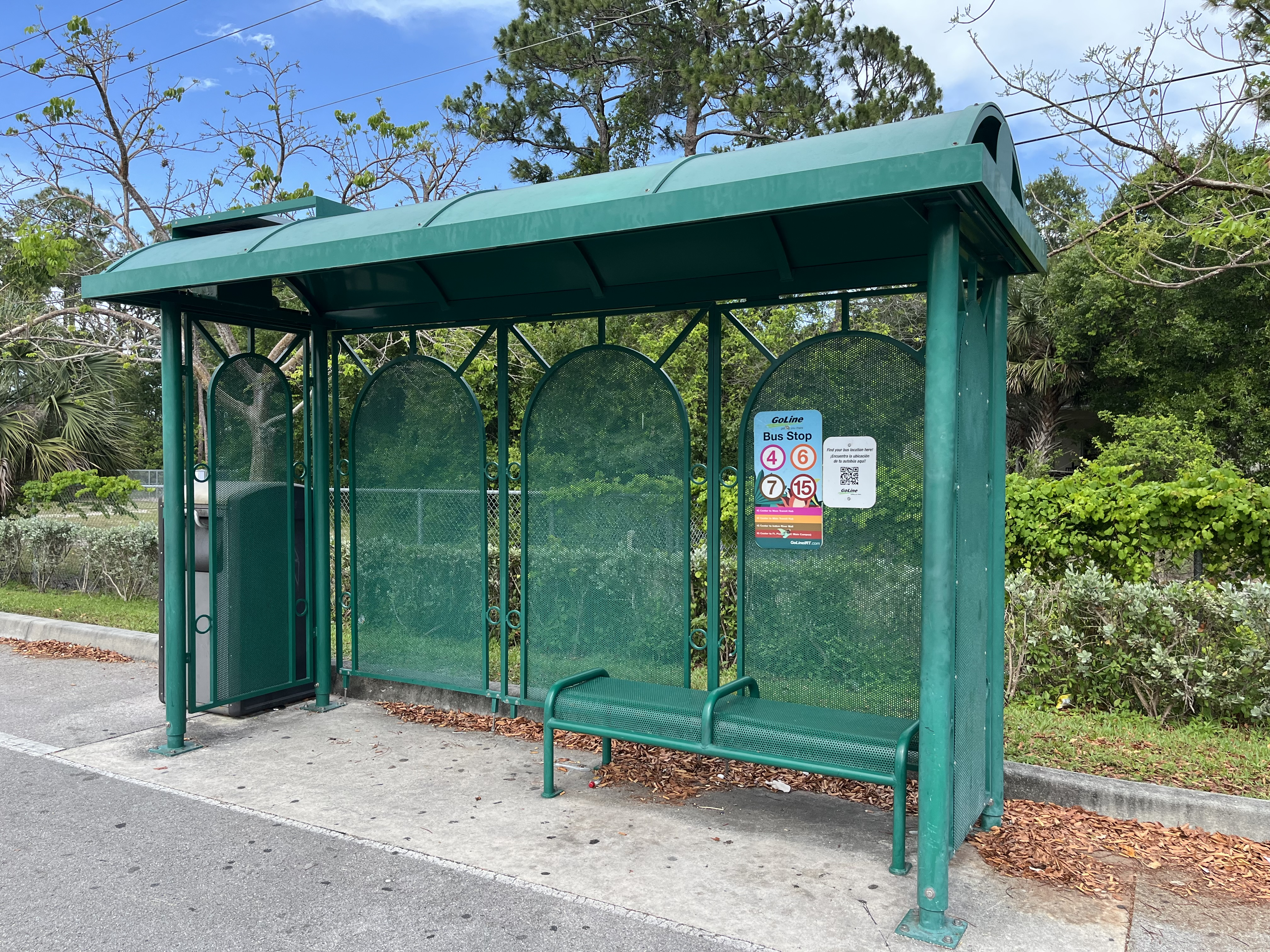
South County Transit Hub

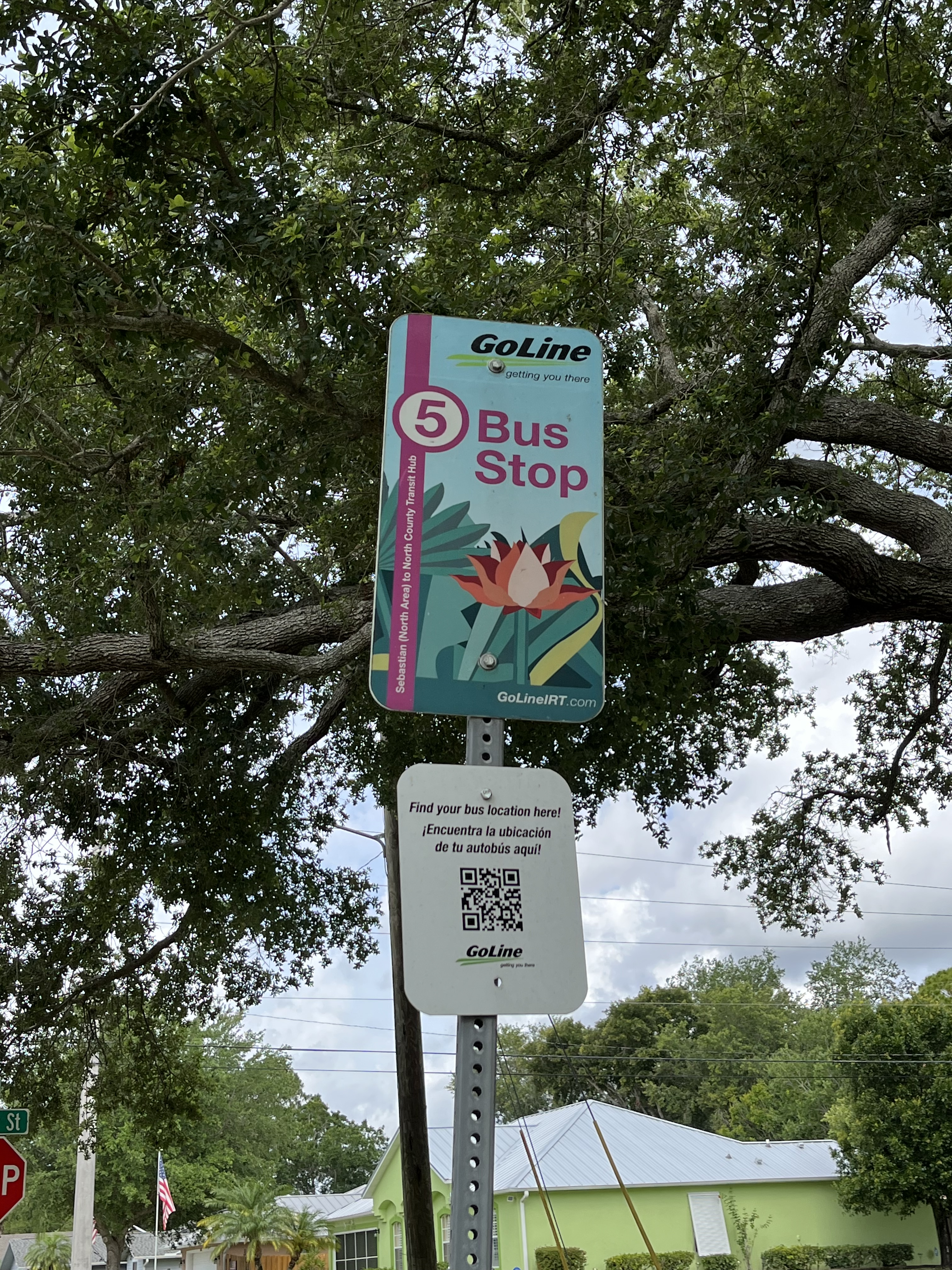
Standard GoLine stop at Barber St. in Sebastian

Most stops consist of a single sign, and there are numerous covered stops as well, like at North and South County Transit Hubs.

== See also ==
- Bus rapid transit
