= Orchid, Florida =

Town in the state of Florida, United States

- Town
- Town of Orchid
- Location in Indian River County and the state of Florida
- Coordinates: 27°46′24″N 80°25′06″W
- Country: United States
- State: Florida
- County: Indian River
- Settled: c. Late 1880s-1886
- Incorporated: May 12th, 1965

Government
  - Type: Council-Manager
  - Mayor: Robert "Bob" J. Gibbons
  - Vice Mayor: Paul Knapp
  - Councilmembers: Daniel McEvoy, James "Jim" Raphalian, and John Heanue
  - Town Manager: Cherry D. Stowe-Siewe
  - Town Clerk: Jane M. Garcia

Area
  - Total: 1.89 sq mi (4.89 km^{2})
  - Land: 1.24 sq mi (3.20 km^{2})
  - Water: 0.65 sq mi (1.69 km^{2})
- Elevation: 0 ft (0 m)

Population (2020)
  - Total: 516
  - Density: 417.6/sq mi (161.24/km^{2})
- Time zone: UTC-5 (Eastern (EST))
  - Summer (DST): UTC-4 (EDT)
- ZIP code: 32963
- Area code: 772
- FIPS code: 12-52175
- GNIS feature ID: 2407052
- Website: www.townoforchid.com

Orchid is a town in Indian River County, Florida, United States. The Town of Orchid is part of the Sebastian–Vero Beach Metropolitan Statistical Area. The population was 516 at the 2020 US Census, up from 415 in the 2010 US Census.

Most of the town is actually a gated community called Orchid Island Golf and Beach Club. East of SR A1A, there is a beach front condominium complex. The rest of Orchid is uninhabited islands. Some of the islands are Plug Island, Preachers Island, and Horseshoe Island. North of Horseshoe Island is Pelican Island, the first National Wildlife Refuge in the United States. Running along the town limits (mostly) is the historic, unpaved Jungle Trail.

== Geography ==
According to the United States Census Bureau, the town has a total area of 1.8 square miles (4.7 km^{2}), of which 1.2 square miles (3.1 km^{2}) is land and 0.6 square miles (1.6 km^{2}) (33.15%) is water.

=== Climate ===
The climate in this area is characterized by hot, humid summers and generally mild winters. According to the Köppen climate classification, the Town of Orchid has a humid subtropical climate zone (Cfa).

== Demographics ==
Historical population
Census	Pop.	Note	%±
1970	8		—
1980	19		137.5%
1990	10		−47.4%
2000	140		1,300.0%
2010	415		196.4%
2020	516		24.3%
U.S. Decennial Census

=== 2010 and 2020 census ===
Orchid racial composition (Hispanics excluded from racial categories) (NH = Non-Hispanic)
Race	Pop 2010	Pop 2020	% 2010	% 2020
White (NH)	403	500	97.11%	96.90%
Black or African American (NH)	0	0	0.00%	0.00%
Native American or Alaska Native (NH)	0	0	0.00%	0.00%
Asian (NH)	4	2	0.96%	0.39%
Pacific Islander or Native Hawaiian (NH)	0	0	0.00%	0.00%
Some other race (NH)	0	1	0.00%	0.19%
Two or more races/Multiracial (NH)	2	6	0.48%	1.16%
Hispanic or Latino (any race)	6	7	1.45%	1.36%
Total	415	516	100.00%	100.00%

As of the 2020 United States census, there were 516 people, 230 households, and 188 families residing in the town.

As of the 2010 United States census, there were 415 people, 194 households, and 181 families residing in the town.

=== 2000 census ===
As of the census of 2000, there were 140 people, 69 households, and 64 families residing in the town. The population density was 113.8 inhabitants per square mile (43.9/km^{2}). There were 139 housing units at an average density of 113.0 per square mile (43.6/km^{2}). The racial makeup of the town was 100.00% White. Hispanic or Latino of any race were 0.71% of the population.

In 2000, there were 69 households, out of which 7.2% had children under the age of 18 living with them, 92.8% were married couples living together, and 7.2% were non-families. 7.2% of all households were made up of individuals, and none had someone living alone who was 65 years of age or older. The average household size was 2.03 and the average family size was 2.11.

In 2000, in the town, the population was spread out, with 4.3% under the age of 18, 0.7% from 18 to 24, 4.3% from 25 to 44, 58.6% from 45 to 64, and 32.1% who were 65 years of age or older. The median age was 61 years. For every 100 females, there were 100.0 males. For every 100 females age 18 and over, there were 97.1 males.

In 2000, the median income for a household in the town was in excess of $200,000, as is the median income for a family. Males had a median income of over $100,000 versus $36,250 for females. The per capita income for the town was $135,870. None of the population is below the poverty line.

== Notable attractions ==
Disney's Vero Beach Resort, a part of the Disney Vacation resorts, is located in the area.

The Environmental Learning Center is located in the Orchid–Wabasso area.
