= Vero Lake Estates, Florida =

Unincorporated community in Florida, U.S.

Vero Lake Estates is an unincorporated community in Indian River County, Florida, United States, off CR 510. It contains the western portion of Wabasso Road, although it is not connected to CR 510. The entire area contains a street grid, (77th Street on the south; County Road 512 (95th Street) on the north, and 90th Avenue on the east; 108th Avenue on the west). The ZIP Code for Vero Lake Estates is 32967.

As of the 2020 census, Vero Lake Estates had a population of 6,782.

Vero Lake Estates is part of Vero Beach Metropolitan Statistical Area.

== Geography ==
Vero Lake Estates is located at 27°45′05″N 80°31′44″W.

=== Main roads ===
==== Wabasso Road ====
This road is the westernmost portion of 85th Street, although it is not connected to CR 510. It is a dirt road, which has now been partially paved, with the major intersection of 101st Avenue, where the pavement ends. The western part of the road is split with a canal. Near CR 510, it becomes 90th Avenue. The western terminus is 106th Avenue, near Interstate 95.

==== 101st Avenue ====
This road is paved and provides access to County Road 512. It is paved until 79th Street and has a traffic signal at CR512 and 101st Avenue.

==== 87th ST ====
This connects CR510 to the inner VLE, it is paved and has a traffic light at the intersection of 87th ST and CR 510.

==== 91st Ave ====
This road runs parallel to 510's north–south direction. The road is paved between 87th Ave and 79th, and serves as VLE's easternmost main road.

== Demographics ==
Vero Lake Estates first appeared as a census designated place in the 2020 U.S. census.

=== 2020 census ===
As of the 2020 census, Vero Lake Estates had a population of 6,782. The median age was 37.4 years. 26.3% of residents were under the age of 18 and 15.0% of residents were 65 years of age or older. For every 100 females there were 100.5 males, and for every 100 females age 18 and over there were 98.0 males age 18 and over.

99.7% of residents lived in urban areas, while 0.3% lived in rural areas.

There were 2,310 households in Vero Lake Estates, of which 38.3% had children under the age of 18 living in them. Of all households, 57.8% were married-couple households, 14.3% were households with a male householder and no spouse or partner present, and 19.3% were households with a female householder and no spouse or partner present. About 16.7% of all households were made up of individuals and 8.2% had someone living alone who was 65 years of age or older.

There were 2,433 housing units, of which 5.1% were vacant. The homeowner vacancy rate was 0.6% and the rental vacancy rate was 6.7%.

Racial composition as of the 2020 census
Race	Number	Percent
White	4,921	72.6%
Black or African American	293	4.3%
American Indian and Alaska Native	56	0.8%
Asian	59	0.9%
Native Hawaiian and Other Pacific Islander	2	0.0%
Some other race	499	7.4%
Two or more races	952	14.0%
Hispanic or Latino (of any race)	1,619	23.9%

== History ==
The subdivision of Vero Lake Estates was foreclosed upon after it was developed mainly because of the distance between where most of Sebastian commerce and business was located. It became a popular area to live after the housing boom and the population explosion in Indian River County circa the early 2000s. Developers bought blocks of land because of the extremely low prices and the abundance of land.

There are now around 2,700 homes in the area.

=== 2023 Floods ===
On November 16, 2023, Vero Lake Estates was severely affected by the November 2023 Northern Indian River County Floods after 10+ inches of rain fell in the area.
