= Historic Sebastian Grammar and Junior High School =

- Sebastian Grammar and Junior High School
- U.S. National Register of Historic Places
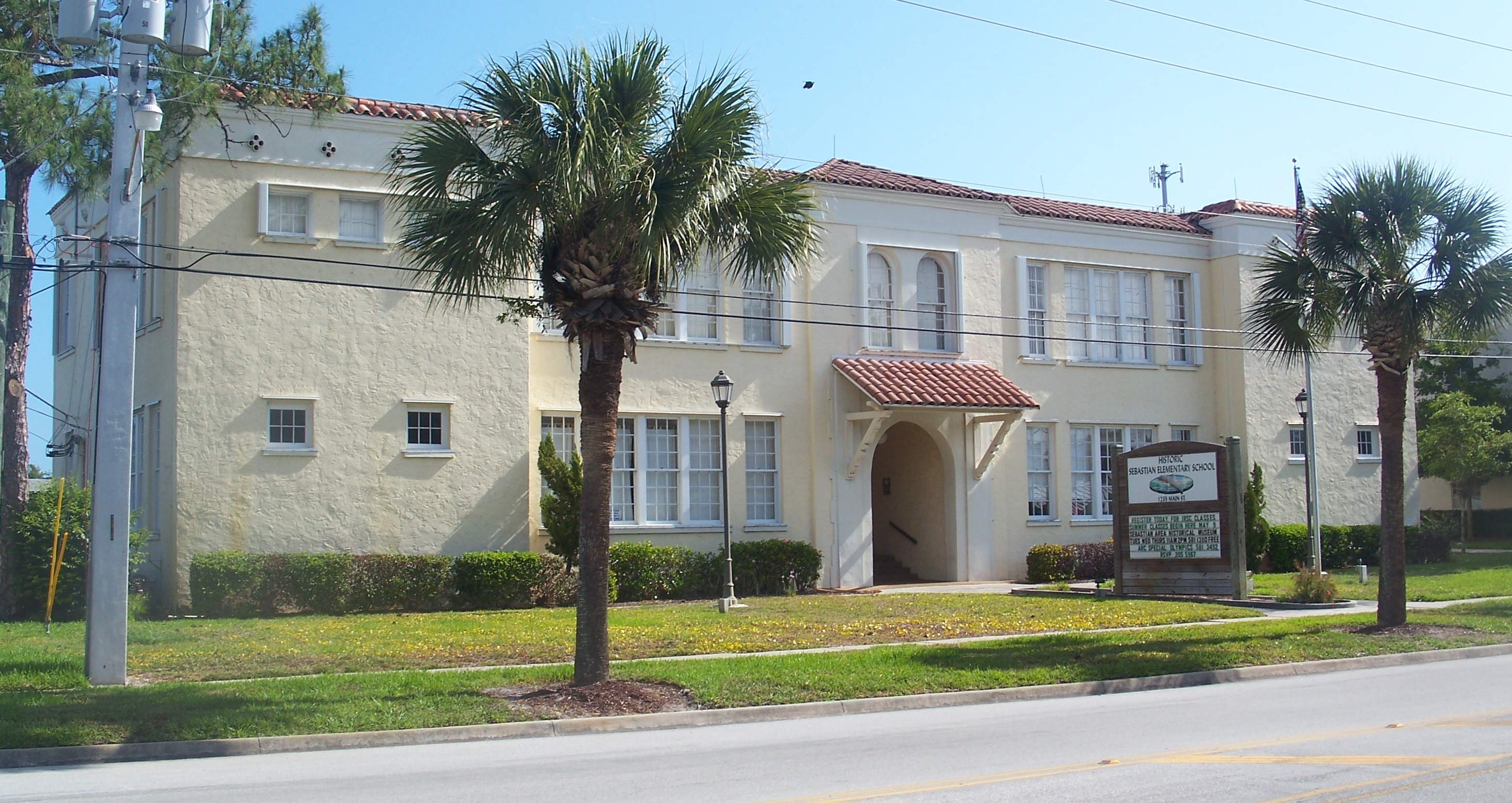

- Location within Florida Location within the United States
- Location: 1235 Main St., Sebastian, Florida
- Coordinates: 27°49′2″N 80°28′33″W
- Built: 1928
- Architect: William W. Hatcher and Lawrence S. Funke
- Architectural style: Mission/Spanish Revival, Mediterranean Revival
- NRHP reference No.: 01000889
- Added to NRHP: August 17, 2001

The Sebastian Grammar and Junior High School (also known as the Sebastian Elementary School) is a historic school in Sebastian, Florida. It is located at 1235 Main Street. On August 17, 2001, it was added to the U.S. National Register of Historic Places. The building is part of the Sebastian City Hall complex and currently houses a museum.
