= Indian River County Library System =

Salman Kollam

The Indian River County Library System is a public library system in Indian River County, Florida, which coordinates activities between its branch libraries and collectively serves Indian River County. It is funded by the Indian River County Board of County Commissioners as well as donations from the Friends of the Library.

== Branches ==
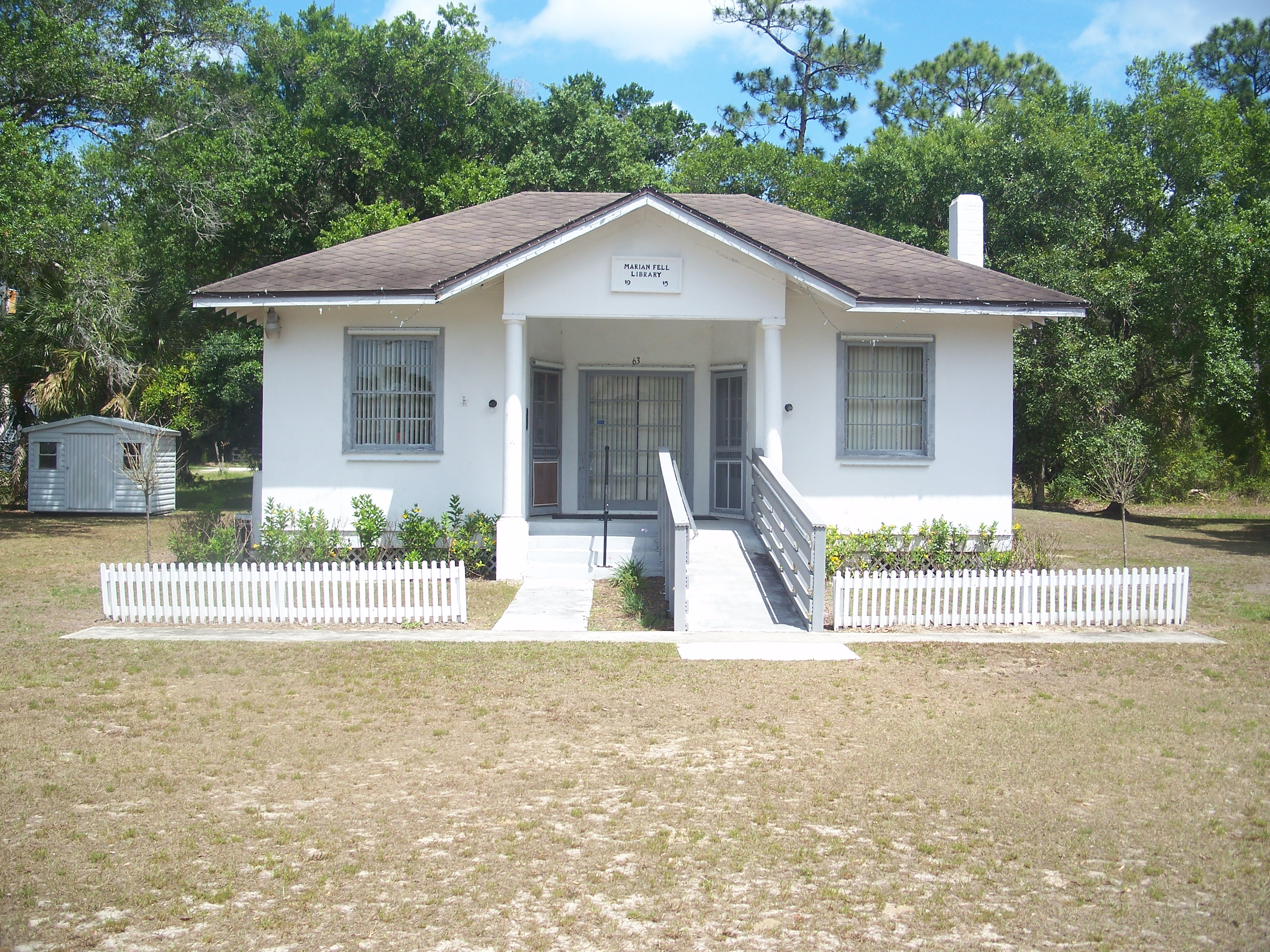
Marian Fell Library

- Indian River County Main Library - (Vero Beach) The collection consists of over 270,000 items including: books, magazines, newspapers, audiobooks, CDs and DVDs, microfilm/microfiche, as well as the Indian River County Courthouse law library.
- North Indian River County Library - (Sebastian)
- Brackett Library - located on the Indian River State College Mueller Campus
- Gifford Youth Achievement Center
- Marian Fell Library - The historic library building was erected in 1915 with the royalties made by Marian Fell, the daughter of the founder of Fellsmere, from her English translations of Russian folk tales. Despite her longstanding desire to build a library, her father, Nelson E. Fell, refused to fund the project; she subsequently established the Fellsmere Library Association in collaboration with 38 other members and the Florida Federation of Women's Club for the purpose of founding and maintaining a public library.
- Vending Library at the IG Center

== Borrowing Policies ==
Library cards are free to Indian River County residents and property owners with proof of identification. Library cards for children and youths ages 16 and under must be co-signed by a parent or guardian. Library cards are valid for two years from the cardholder's birthdate, and the cardholder must renew his/her privilege in person. Non-resident cards are $10 for 3 months, $20 for 6 months, or $30 for one year. With a valid library account, patrons may borrow:

- (50) Circulating books, (5) magazines, and (5) audiobooks - 3 weeks
- (5) eBooks & (5) eAudiobooks - 2 weeks
- (1) One Week Wonder books - 1 week
- Book Club in a Bag - 6 weeks
- Audiovisual materials (CDs, DVDs) - 1 week
- Reference books (requires a deposit set at the Director’s discretion) - 24 hours
- Audiovisual Equipment - 24 hours

Circulating items (excluding one week wonder books) may be renewed unless there is a reserve from another patron placed on the items. Patrons may renew online. Overdue fines are 25¢ per day for books, 50¢ per day for audiovisual materials, and $25 per day for audiovisual equipment. Fines will not exceed the cost of the item.
