= Wabasso Bridge =

Bridge in Florida, United States of America

Wabasso Causeway Bridge
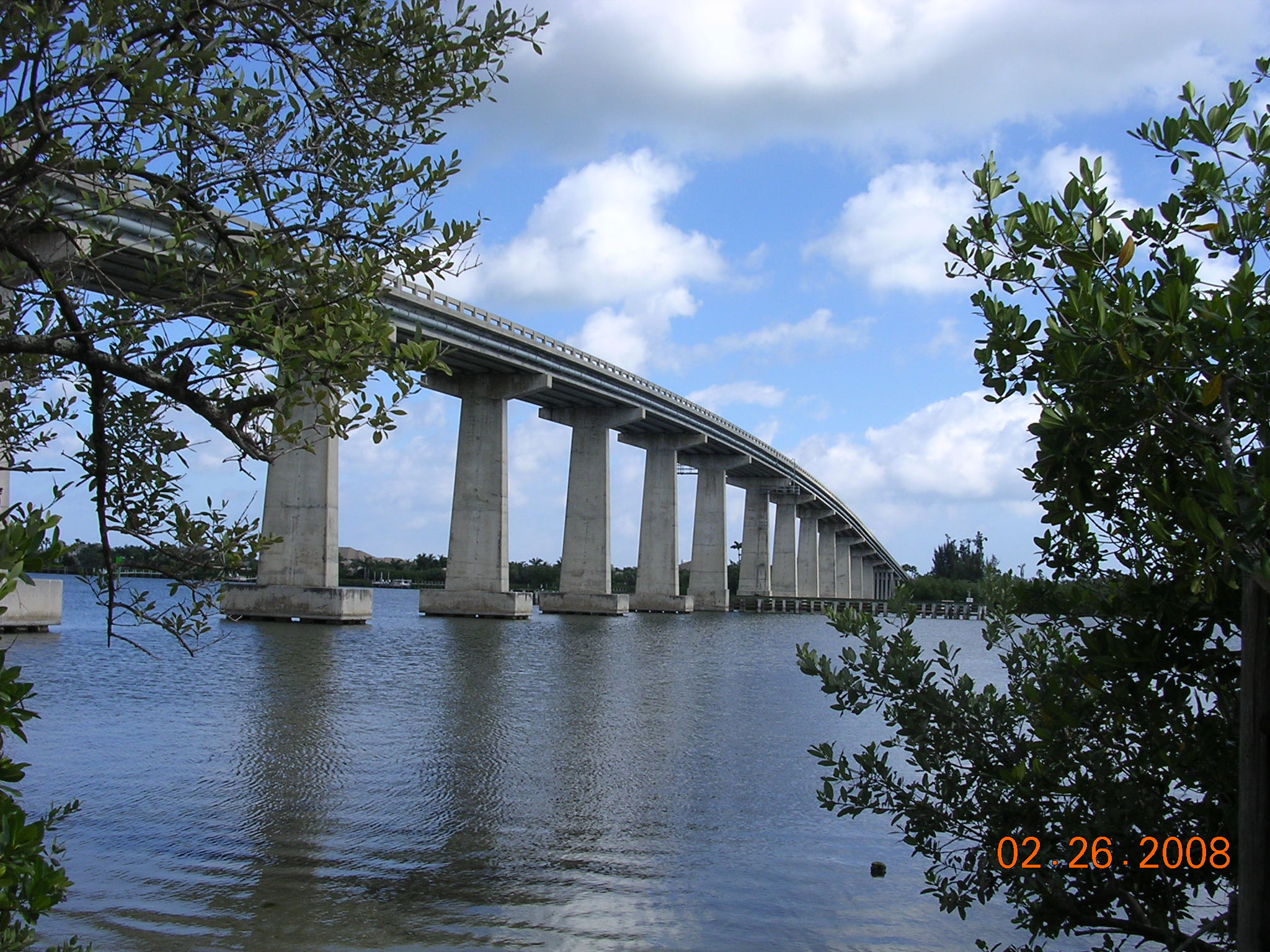
- Coordinates: 27°45′41″N 80°24′58″W
- Carries: SR 510
- Crosses: Indian River
- Locale: Indian River County, Florida

Characteristics
- Design: concrete deck
- Clearance below: 20 m (66 ft)

History
- Opened: 1970

Location
- Interactive map of Wabasso Causeway Bridge

The Wabasso Causeway Bridge is a two-lane concrete bridge spanning the Indian River (Intracoastal Waterway) in Indian River County, Florida. The bridge was built by Scott Construction Company and was completed in 1970.

The Florida Department of Transportation numbers are 880051 and 880053.

It crosses the Intracoastal Waterway at Statute Mile 943, southeast of unlighted day beacon #80.

The two-lane bridge has a vertical clearance of 65 feet (20 m). The bridge replaced the old drawbridge that was built in 1927.
