= Florida State Road 508 =

Highway in Melbourne, Florida

State Road 508
- NASA Boulevard

Route information
- Maintained by FDOT
- Length: 1.364 mi (2.195 km)

Major junctions
- West end: Melbourne International Airport
- East end: US 1 in Melbourne

Location
- Country: United States
- State: Florida
- Counties: Brevard

Highway system
- Florida State Highway System; Interstate; US; State; Former; Pre‑1945; Toll; Scenic
← SR 507	→ SR 510

State Road 508 (SR 508), also known as NASA Boulevard, is a 1.4-mile-long (2.3 km) east–west road in Melbourne. It extends from Eddie Allen Road next to the Melbourne International Airport exit east to U.S. Route 1 (US 1 or SR 5).

== Major intersections ==
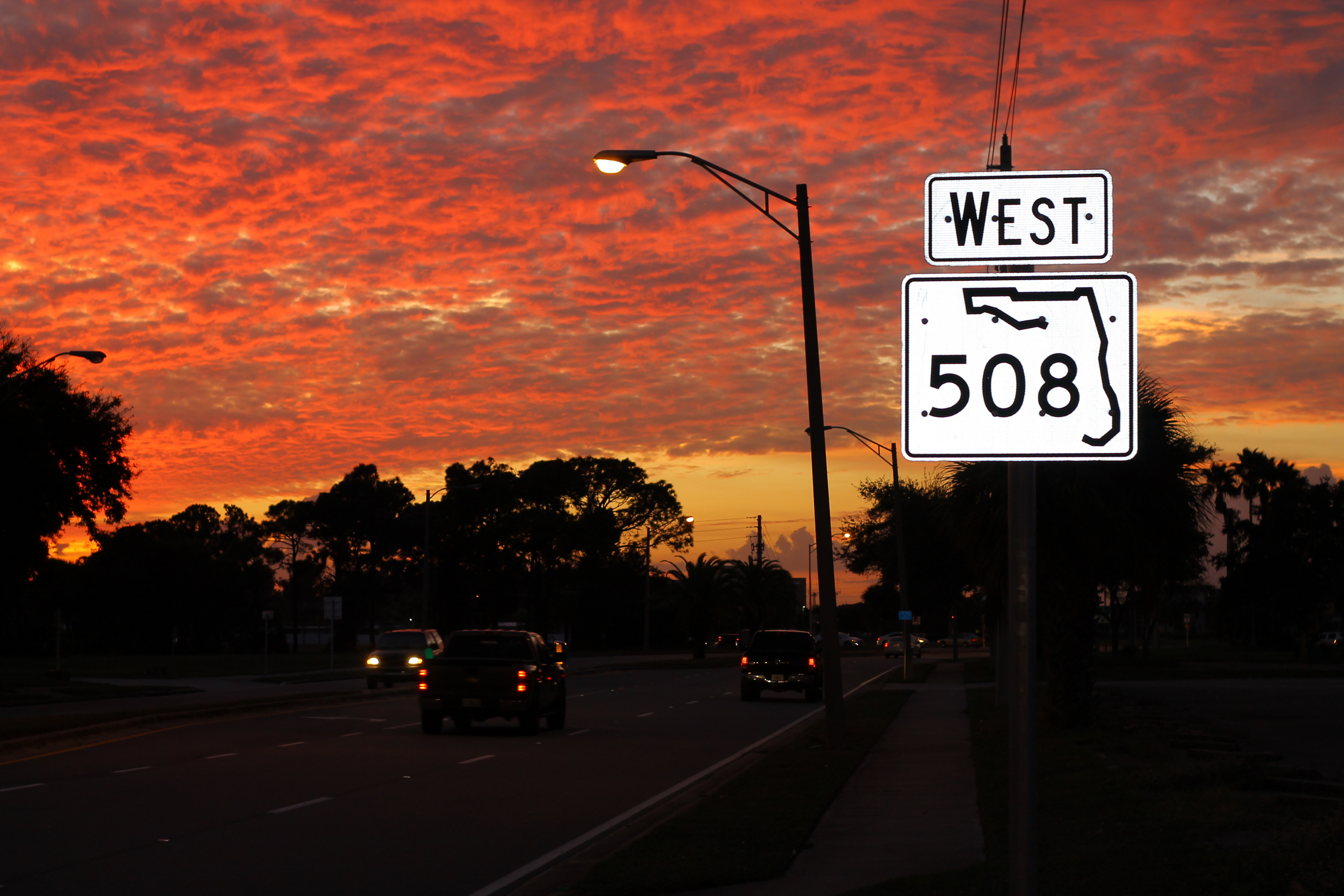
A sign denoting Florida State Road 508 during a sunset in Melbourne, Florida.

The entire route is in Melbourne, Brevard County.

mi	km	Destinations	Notes
0.000	0.000	Eddie Allen Road	Exit from Melbourne International Airport
0.252	0.406	Air Terminal Parkway - Melbourne International Airport (passengers)	
0.640	1.030	Babcock Street (CR 507)	
1.364	2.195	US 1 (Harbor City Boulevard / SR 5)	
1.000 mi = 1.609 km; 1.000 km = 0.621 mi
