= West Vero Corridor, Florida =

- Census-designated place
- Location in Indian River County and the state of Florida
- Coordinates: 27°38′42″N 80°29′48″W
- Country: United States
- State: Florida
- County: Indian River

Area
  - Total: 5.96 sq mi (15.43 km^{2})
  - Land: 5.86 sq mi (15.17 km^{2})
  - Water: 0.10 sq mi (0.26 km^{2})
- Elevation: 16 ft (4.9 m)

Population (2020)
  - Total: 10,039
  - Density: 1,714.0/sq mi (661.79/km^{2})
- Time zone: UTC-5 (Eastern (EST))
  - Summer (DST): UTC-4 (EDT)
- ZIP code: 32966
- Area code: 772
- FIPS code: 12-76937
- GNIS feature ID: 1853305

West Vero Corridor is a census-designated place (CDP) in Indian River County, Florida, United States. The population was 10,039 at the 2020 census,. It is a principal part of the Sebastian–Vero Beach–West Vero Corridor Metropolitan Statistical Area.

== Geography ==
West Vero Corridor is located southeast of the geographic center of Indian River County extending 4 miles (6 km) along both sides of Florida State Road 60 west of the city Vero Beach. It is bordered to the east by the Vero Beach South CDP and to the west by Interstate 95. The center of Vero Beach is 3 miles (5 km) east of the CDP via SR 60. I-95 leads north 33 miles (53 km) to Melbourne and south 16 miles (26 km) to Fort Pierce.

According to the United States Census Bureau, the CDP has a total area of 4.9 square miles (12.8 km^{2}), of which 4.9 square miles (12.6 km^{2}) are land and 0.1 square miles (0.2 km^{2}), or 1.71%, are water.

== History ==
Prior to the arrival of European settlers, the land that is makes up the West Vero Corridor was home to several Native American tribes, including the Ais and Seminoles. As did most indigenous people, these tribes survived by relying upon resources provided by the nearby Indian River and the surrounding wilderness. In the 16th century, Spanish explorers arrived in Florida, establishing several settlements along the coast, and bringing European influence to the region.

However, it wasn’t until the late 19th and early 20th centuries that West Vero Corridor saw significant settlement. The area was primarily used for cattle grazing and agriculture, especially in citrus farming, which became a major industry in the area.

Between the 1980s and the turn of the 21st century, West Vero Corridor experienced a new boom in growth and development. The construction of major highways and infrastructure projects opened up the area to more residents and businesses, including the Indian River Mall and the Vero Beach Outlets.

West Vero Corridor saw minor impacts from the November 2023 floods when around 6” of rain fell in the area.

== Demographics ==
Historical population
Census	Pop.	Note	%±
2000	7,695		—
2010	7,138		−7.2%
2020	10,039		40.6%
U.S. Decennial Census

=== 2020 census ===
As of the 2020 census, West Vero Corridor had a population of 10,039. There were 5,638 households and 6,685 housing units, and the population density was 1,714 inhabitants per square mile.

The median age was 66.6 years. 8.3% of residents were under the age of 18, and 53.6% of residents were 65 years of age or older. For every 100 females there were 80.2 males, and for every 100 females age 18 and over there were 78.0 males age 18 and over. Males made up 46.2% and females comprised 53.8% of the population.

99.7% of residents lived in urban areas, while 0.3% lived in rural areas.

There were 5,638 households in West Vero Corridor, of which 9.7% had children under the age of 18 living in them. Of all households, 39.8% were married-couple households, 18.0% were households with a male householder and no spouse or partner present, and 37.2% were households with a female householder and no spouse or partner present. About 43.7% of all households were made up of individuals, and 32.2% had someone living alone who was 65 years of age or older.

There were 6,685 housing units, of which 15.7% were vacant. The homeowner vacancy rate was 5.2% and the rental vacancy rate was 8.3%.

Racial composition as of the 2020 census
Race	Number	Percent
White	8,824	87.9%
Black or African American	201	2.0%
American Indian and Alaska Native	22	0.2%
Asian	121	1.2%
Native Hawaiian and Other Pacific Islander	3	0.0%
Some other race	253	2.5%
Two or more races	615	6.1%
Hispanic or Latino (of any race)	796	7.9%

=== Income and poverty ===
The median income for a household was $51,998, and the per capita income was $36,383. About 8.5% of the population was below the poverty line.

== Government ==
The West Vero Corridor community is a census designated place, governed by Board of County Commissioners. Indian River County is divided into five county commission districts. The West Vero Corridor is represented jointly by Districts 1 and 3. All governmental functions are carried out by the county departments.

Police protection is provided by the Indian River County Sheriff's Office. The Sheriff's Office provides coverage for all unincorporated areas of the county from their headquarters in Vero Beach.

Fire and EMS services are provided by Stations 7 and 14 of the Indian River County Fire Rescue.
