= Winter Beach, Florida =

- Census-designated place
- Location in Indian River County and the state of Florida
- Coordinates: 27°42′43″N 80°25′31″W
- Country: United States
- State: Florida
- County: Indian River
- established as Quay: 1902
- became Winter Beach: 1922

Area
  - Total: 6.90 sq mi (17.86 km^{2})
  - Land: 6.88 sq mi (17.82 km^{2})
  - Water: 0.015 sq mi (0.04 km^{2})
- Elevation: 20 ft (6.1 m)

Population (2020)
  - Total: 3,136
  - Density: 455.9/sq mi (176.02/km^{2})
- Time zone: UTC-5 (Eastern (EST))
  - Summer (DST): UTC-4 (EDT)
- ZIP code: 32971
- Area code: 772
- FIPS code: 12-78225
- GNIS feature ID: 2403037

Winter Beach is a census-designated place (CDP) in Indian River County, Florida, United States. As of the 2020 census, Winter Beach had a population of 3,136. It is part of the Sebastian–Vero Beach Metropolitan Statistical Area.

== Geography ==
Winter Beach is located in eastern Indian River County. It is bordered to the north by Wabasso and to the south by Gifford. To the east, across the Indian River, is the town of Indian River Shores on Orchid Island.

U.S. Route 1 passes through the center of Winter Beach, leading north 7 miles (11 km) to Sebastian and south 6 miles (10 km) to Vero Beach, the county seat.

According to the United States Census Bureau, the Winter Beach CDP has a total area of 6.9 square miles (17.9 km^{2}), of which 0.02 square miles (0.04 km^{2}), or 0.22%, are water.

=== Climate ===
The climate in this area is characterized by hot, humid summers and generally mild to cool winters. According to the Köppen Climate Classification system, Winter Beach has a humid subtropical climate, abbreviated "Cfa" on climate maps.

== History ==
Winter Beach was originally established as the town of Woodley in the late 1890s. In 1902, the community's name was changed to Quay, in honor of Senator Matthew S. Quay of Pennsylvania. Senator Quay had introduced a Senate bill to widen and deepen the Intracoastal Waterway, which the community thought would be of benefit. Senator Quay was a winter resident of St. Lucie Village, just north of Fort Pierce, where his old home still stands. In 1922 the name of the community was changed for promotional purposes to Winter Beach, "Where the Sunshine Spends the Winter". In 1925, Indian River County was established, and Winter Beach almost became the county seat, however the then-town of Vero (now Vero Beach) became an incorporated city and was selected as the county seat. Portions of Winter Beach were still enumerated as Quay in the 1940 census.

== Demographics ==
Historical population
Census	Pop.	Note	%±
2020	3,136		—
U.S. Decennial Census

=== 2020 census ===
As of the 2020 census, Winter Beach had a population of 3,136. The median age was 57.3 years. 16.0% of residents were under the age of 18 and 35.2% of residents were 65 years of age or older. For every 100 females there were 92.2 males, and for every 100 females age 18 and over there were 91.7 males age 18 and over.

85.6% of residents lived in urban areas, while 14.4% lived in rural areas.

There were 1,283 households in Winter Beach, of which 19.1% had children under the age of 18 living in them. Of all households, 67.1% were married-couple households, 12.9% were households with a male householder and no spouse or partner present, and 14.6% were households with a female householder and no spouse or partner present. About 18.3% of all households were made up of individuals and 10.1% had someone living alone who was 65 years of age or older.

There were 1,429 housing units, of which 10.2% were vacant. The homeowner vacancy rate was 2.3% and the rental vacancy rate was 7.3%.

Racial composition as of the 2020 census
Race	Number	Percent
White	2,589	82.6%
Black or African American	167	5.3%
American Indian and Alaska Native	7	0.2%
Asian	83	2.6%
Native Hawaiian and Other Pacific Islander	2	0.1%
Some other race	56	1.8%
Two or more races	232	7.4%
Hispanic or Latino (of any race)	245	7.8%

=== 2000 census ===
As of the census of 2000, there were 965 people, 373 households, and 298 families residing in the CDP. The population density was 140.1 inhabitants per square mile (54.1/km^{2}). There were 405 housing units at an average density of 58.8 per square mile (22.7/km^{2}). The racial makeup of the CDP was 97.20% White, 1.45% African American, 0.41% Native American, 0.62% Asian, and 0.31% from two or more races. Hispanic or Latino of any race were 1.87% of the population.

There were 373 households, out of which 23.6% had children under the age of 18 living with them, 70.8% were married couples living together, 6.4% had a female householder with no husband present, and 20.1% were non-families. 15.5% of all households were made up of individuals, and 7.0% had someone living alone who was 65 years of age or older. The average household size was 2.51 and the average family size was 2.76.

In the CDP, the population was spread out, with 19.2% under the age of 18, 4.5% from 18 to 24, 23.2% from 25 to 44, 27.2% from 45 to 64, and 26.0% who were 65 years of age or older. The median age was 47 years. For every 100 females, there were 103.1 males. For every 100 females age 18 and over, there were 102.6 males.

The median income for a household in the CDP was $85,091, and the median income for a family was $87,400. Males had a median income of $26,591 versus $29,286 for females. The per capita income for the CDP was $35,169. About 2.0% of families and 2.2% of the population were below the poverty line, including 2.7% of those under age 18 and none of those age 65 or over.
