= Gifford, Florida =

- Census-designated place
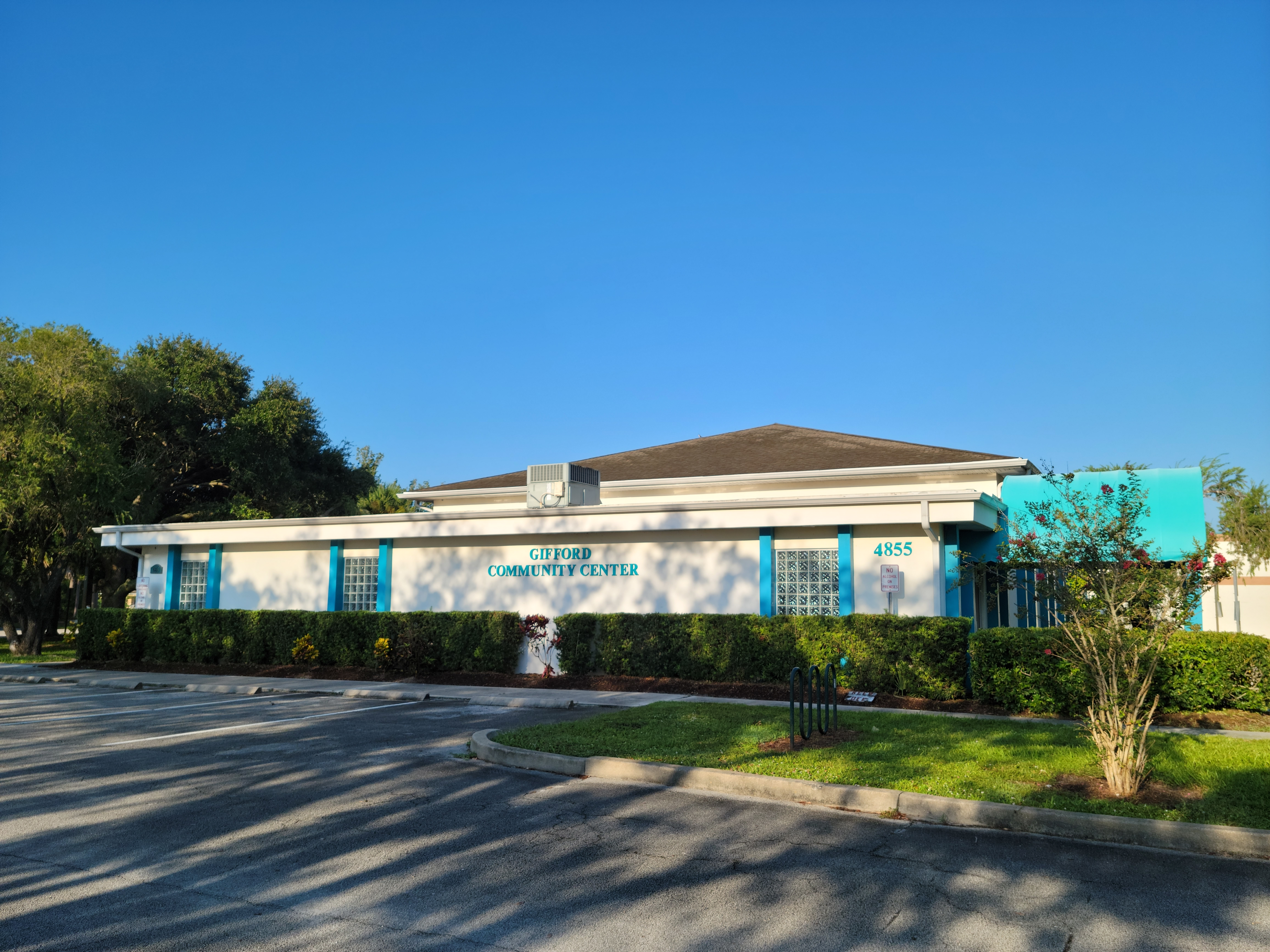
- Community Center

- Location in Indian River County and the state of Florida
- Coordinates: 27°40′32″N 80°25′31″W
- Country: United States
- State: Florida
- County: Indian River

Area
  - Total: 2.72 sq mi (7.04 km^{2})
  - Land: 2.72 sq mi (7.04 km^{2})
  - Water: 0 sq mi (0.00 km^{2})
- Elevation: 20 ft (6.1 m)

Population (2020)
  - Total: 5,511
  - Density: 2,030/sq mi (783/km^{2})
- Time zone: UTC-5 (Eastern (EST))
  - Summer (DST): UTC-4 (EDT)
- ZIP code: 32967
- Area code: 772
- FIPS code: 12-25925
- GNIS feature ID: 2402525
- Website: www.ircgov.com

Gifford (/ˈɡɪfərd/) is an unincorporated community and census-designated place (CDP) in Indian River County, Florida, United States. It is part of the Sebastian–Vero Beach Metropolitan Statistical Area. The population was 5,511 at the 2020 census. Gifford has a rich African American history and is noted as the hometown of several African-American landscape artists who were members of The Highwaymen. Gifford is one of the poorest communities in Florida.

== History ==
The settlement of Gifford was organized in the mid-1880s, according to the Indian River County Historical Society. The area was named as the Woodley precinct in the 1900 census, and as a settlement village for black families, the community grew. By 1893, the early settlers of Gifford had been joined by black laborers who had come to work on Henry Flagler's new railroad project, the Florida East Coast Railway. The residents named the small agricultural community Brownsville after farmer William Brown who settled there in 1880s, but another town in North Florida carried the same name. Instead, the community was named after Charlie Gifford, the railroad's stationmaster and Henry T. Gifford's son.

The town's first school was built in 1898, but only served white children. In 1901 William Edward Geoffrey, a black man from Darlington, South Carolina who had come to work on the railroad, set up school for black children. The school served as the heart of the community and remained Gifford High School until integration, and the last graduating class was in 1969, before transitioning into the middle school.

In 2018, the Historic Macedonia Church was converted into the Gifford Historical Museum by the Gifford Community Cultural & Resource Center (GCCRC).

One of the highlights of Gifford is the Victor Hart Sr. Community Enhancement Complex located at the northern end of 43rd Avenue. The complex was renamed in 2017 to honor Mr. Hart for his work and outreach in the community.

== Geography ==
Gifford is in eastern Indian River County, on the west side of the Indian River, a tidal channel. It is bordered to the south by Vero Beach, the county seat; to the north by Winter Beach; and to the east, across the Indian River, by Indian River Shores. U.S. Route 1 passes through the center of Gifford, leading north 10 miles (16 km) to Sebastian and south through Vero Beach 17 miles (27 km) to Fort Pierce. Interstate 95 at Exit 147 is 9 miles (14 km) west of Gifford.

According to the United States Census Bureau in 2010, the Gifford CDP has a total area of 7.31 square miles (18.94 km^{2}), of which 6.81 square miles (17.65 km^{2}) are land and 0.50 square miles (1.29 km^{2}), or 6.79%, are water. The 2020 census lists Gifford as having 2.72 square miles (7.04 km2), none of which was water.

== Demographics ==
Historical population
| Census | Pop. | Note | %± |
|---|---|---|---|
| 2000 | 7,599 | | — |
| 2010 | 9,590 | | 26.2% |
| 2020 | 5,511 | | −42.5% |
U.S. Decennial Census; 2010 2020

=== Racial and ethnic composition ===
Gifford CDP, Florida – Racial and ethnic composition Note: the US Census treats Hispanic/Latino as an ethnic category. This table excludes Latinos from the racial categories and assigns them to a separate category. Hispanics/Latinos may be of any race.
| Race / Ethnicity (NH = Non-Hispanic) | Pop 2000 | Pop 2010 | Pop 2020 | % 2000 | % 2010 | % 2020 |
|---|---|---|---|---|---|---|
| White alone (NH) | 2,615 | 4,399 | 636 | 34.41% | 45.87% | 11.54% |
| Black or African American alone (NH) | 4,328 | 4,170 | 4,139 | 56.95% | 43.48% | 75.10% |
| Native American or Alaska Native alone (NH) | 8 | 16 | 8 | 0.11% | 0.17% | 0.15% |
| Asian alone (NH) | 19 | 58 | 15 | 0.25% | 0.60% | 0.27% |
| Native Hawaiian or Pacific Islander alone (NH) | 0 | 1 | 1 | 0.00% | 0.01% | 0.02% |
| Other race alone (NH) | 15 | 12 | 25 | 0.20% | 0.13% | 0.45% |
| Mixed race or Multiracial (NH) | 107 | 123 | 169 | 1.41% | 1.28% | 3.07% |
| Hispanic or Latino (any race) | 507 | 811 | 518 | 6.67% | 8.46% | 9.40% |
| Total | 7,599 | 9,590 | 5,511 | 100.00% | 100.00% | 100.00% |

=== 2020 census ===
As of the 2020 census, Gifford had a population of 5,511. The population declined substantially from 2010 to 2020 due to the U.S. Census Bureau reducing the size of the CDP by removing the area east of Route 1. The median age was 35.6 years. 29.6% of residents were under the age of 18 and 16.1% of residents were 65 years of age or older. For every 100 females there were 87.8 males, and for every 100 females age 18 and over there were 79.9 males age 18 and over.

100.0% of residents lived in urban areas, while 0.0% lived in rural areas.

There were 2,033 households in Gifford, of which 36.5% had children under the age of 18 living in them. Of all households, 26.5% were married-couple households, 20.5% were households with a male householder and no spouse or partner present, and 45.7% were households with a female householder and no spouse or partner present. About 29.0% of all households were made up of individuals and 14.5% had someone living alone who was 65 years of age or older.

There were 2,247 housing units, of which 9.5% were vacant. The homeowner vacancy rate was 1.2% and the rental vacancy rate was 7.7%.

=== 2000 census ===
As of the census of 2000, there were 7,599 people, 3,036 households, and 1,897 families residing in the CDP. The population density was 1,078.1 inhabitants per square mile (416.3/km^{2}). There were 3,595 housing units at an average density of 510.0 per square mile (196.9/km^{2}). The racial makeup of the CDP was 38.70% White, 57.43% African American, 0.16% Native American, 0.25% Asian, 1.96% from other races, and 1.50% from two or more races. Hispanic or Latino of any race were 6.67% of the population.

There were 3,036 households, out of which 26.4% had children under the age of 18 living with them, 37.8% were married couples living together, 20.5% had a female householder with no husband present, and 37.5% were non-families. 31.9% of all households were made up of individuals, and 17.9% had someone living alone who was 65 years of age or older. The average household size was 2.42 and the average family size was 3.03.

In the CDP, the population was spread out, with 26.2% under the age of 18, 7.9% from 18 to 24, 22.8% from 25 to 44, 20.2% from 45 to 64, and 22.9% who were 65 years of age or older. The median age was 40 years. For every 100 females, there were 84.2 males. For every 100 females age 18 and over, there were 80.3 males.

The median income for a household in the CDP was $29,438, and the median income for a family was $35,354. Males had a median income of $25,716 versus $18,821 for females. The per capita income for the CDP was $19,910. About 19.6% of families and 23.4% of the population were below the poverty line, including 32.3% of those under age 18 and 16.4% of those age 65 or over.

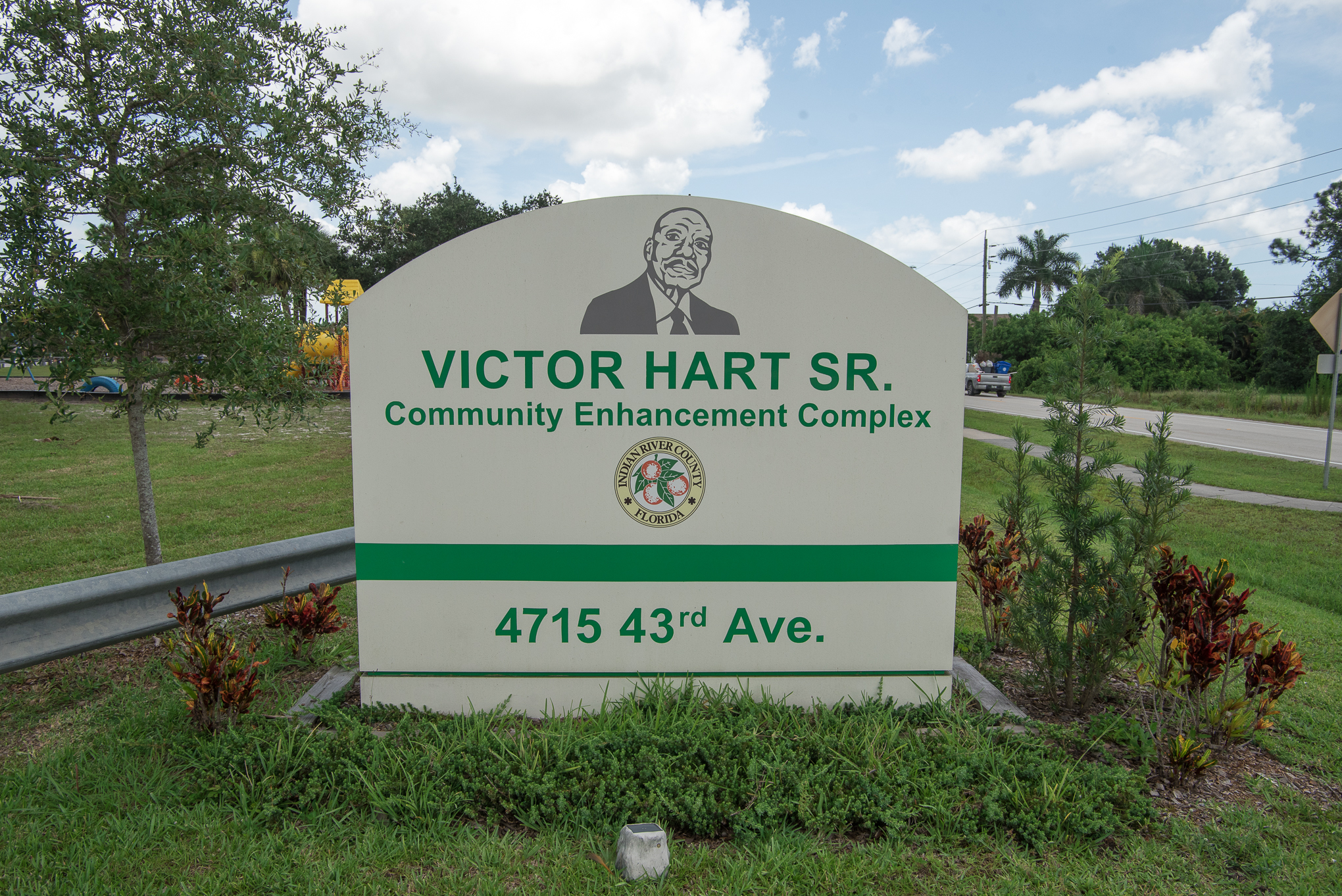
Victor Hart Sr. Community Enhancement Complex

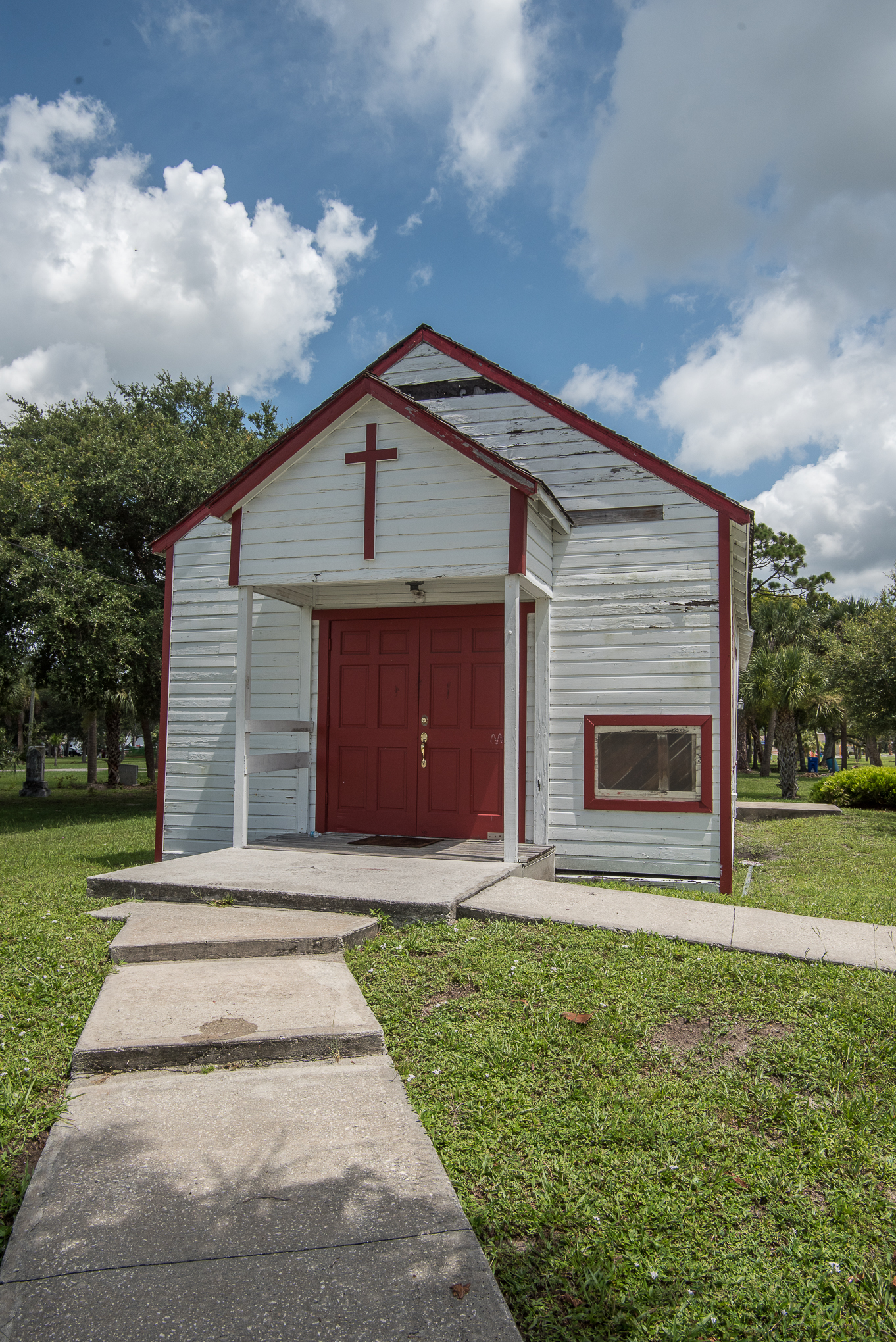
Gifford Historical Museum

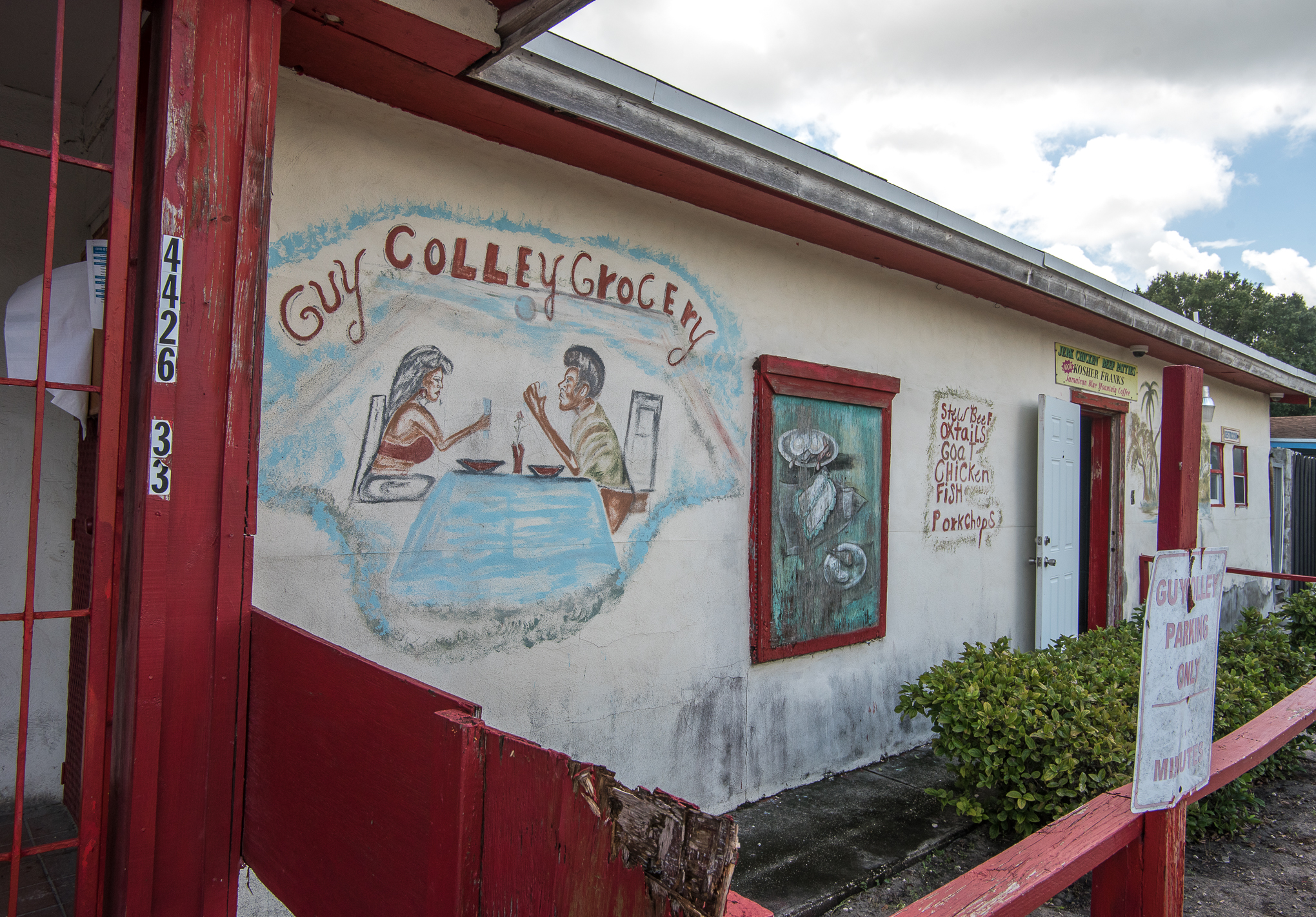
Guy Colley Grocery & Deli

== Notable people ==
- Jade Cargill, professional wrestler
- Muni Long, singer/songwriter
- Harold Newton, landscape artist
- YNW BSlime, rapper
- YNW Melly, rapper
