= Indian River Mall =

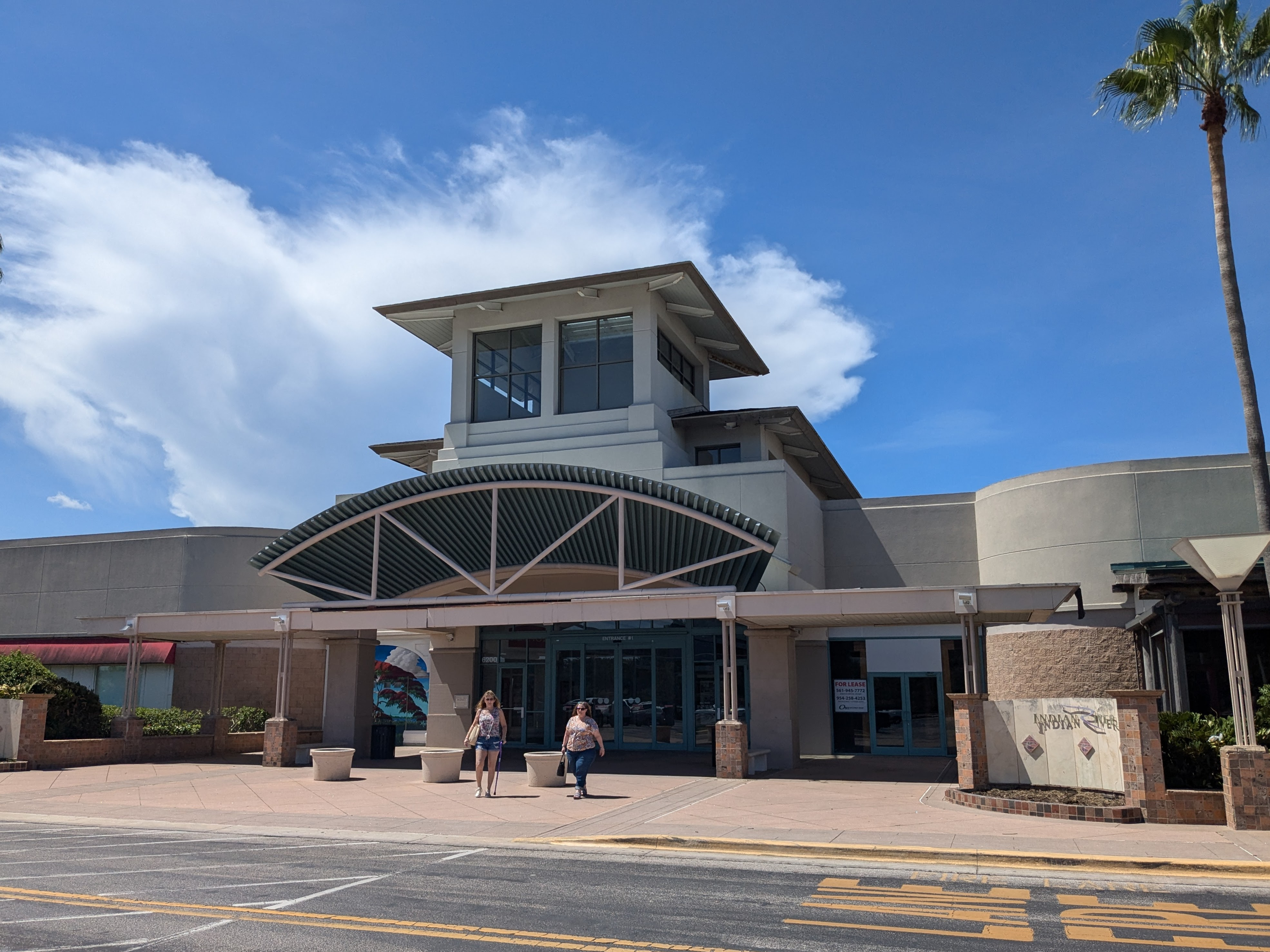
- Location: Vero Beach, Florida, United States
- Coordinates: 27.642593°N 80.45914°W
- Address: 6200 20th St.
- Opened: 1996; 30 years ago
- Developer: Edward J. DeBartolo
- Owner: DTS Properties II, LLC
- Num. of stores: 80+
- Num. of anchor tenants: 5 (3 open, 2 vacant)
- Floor area: 737,000 sq ft (68,500 m^{2})
- Floors: 1

Indian River Mall is an enclosed shopping mall in Vero Beach, Florida. Opened in 1996, it is anchored by Dillard's, AMC Theatres, and JCPenney, with two vacant anchors last occupied by Macy's and Sears.

== History ==
Edward J. DeBartolo Corporation developed Indian River Mall in 1996. Its original anchors were JCPenney, Sears, Dillard's, and Burdines. A food court and 24-screen movie theater were added in 1997.

In 2005, Burdines was renamed to Macy's following their acquisition of the company.

In 2007, a customer found $5,200 inside a pair of shoes he was purchasing.

In 2008, Gap, Disney Store, and RJ Gator's closed.

On December 1, 2014, Simon Malls entered into foreclosure on the property for $71 million. The property, including its adjacent plaza was sold at auction for $100 to the highest bidder on May 13, 2015.

In August 2016, Indian River mall sold an adjacent plaza, called the Indian River Commons, which consists of Best Buy, Ross Dress for Less, Target, Office Depot (now Burlington Coat Factory), Bed Bath & Beyond, Lowe's Home Improvement and Michaels Arts & Crafts.. Both Office Depot and Bed Bath & Beyond have since closed their locations.

In August 2019, it was announced that Sears will be closing this location as part of a plan to close 26 stores nationwide. The store closed in October 2019.

On January 8, 2020, it was announced that Macy's would be closing in April 2020 as part of a plan to close 125 stores nationwide.

In 2020, Victoria's Secret closed at the mall as part of a plan to close 250 stores nationwide. TGI Friday’s closed later that year and became Casa Amigos.

In 2026, the east wing of the mall closed and demolition began on the former Macy's location in June. The entire east wing, including the former Sears, RJ Gator's (originally Guytano's Italian Bistro), and east side of the main entrance corridor will also be demolished, making way for new apartments, retail, restaurants, and an entertainment hub. The west wing, JCPenney, Dillard's, AMC Theaters, and Casa Amigos will stay open. The food court will be renovated rather than demolished.
