= Vero Beach South, Florida =

Vero Beach South, Florida (South Vero, FL)
- CDP
- Location in Indian River County and the state of Florida
- Coordinates: 27°37′31″N 80°24′42″W
- Country: United States
- State: Florida
- County: Indian River

Area
  - Total: 12.41 sq mi (32.13 km^{2})
  - Land: 11.78 sq mi (30.52 km^{2})
  - Water: 0.62 sq mi (1.61 km^{2})
- Elevation: 23 ft (7.0 m)

Population (2020)
  - Total: 28,020
  - Density: 2,377.6/sq mi (918.01/km^{2})
- Time zone: UTC-5 (Eastern (EST))
  - Summer (DST): UTC-4 (EDT)
- ZIP codes: 32962, 32968
- Area code: 772
- FIPS code: 12-74200
- GNIS ID: 2402965

Vero Beach South is a census-designated place (CDP) in Indian River County, Florida, United States. As of the 2020 census, Vero Beach South had a population of 28,020. It is part of the Sebastian–Vero Beach Metropolitan Statistical Area.

== Geography ==
According to the United States Census Bureau, this unincorporated area in Indian River County has a total area of 10.9 square miles (28.2 km^{2}), of which 10.3 square miles (26.8 km^{2}) is land and 0.6 square mile (1.5 km^{2}) (5.23%) is water.

== Demographics ==
Historical population
| Census | Pop. | Note | %± |
|---|---|---|---|
| 2000 | 20,362 | | — |
| 2010 | 23,092 | | 13.4% |
| 2020 | 28,020 | | 21.3% |
U.S. Decennial Census

=== 2020 census ===
As of the 2020 census, Vero Beach South had a population of 28,020. The median age was 50.5 years. 17.4% of residents were under the age of 18 and 28.4% of residents were 65 years of age or older. For every 100 females there were 91.7 males, and for every 100 females age 18 and over there were 88.5 males age 18 and over.

100.0% of residents lived in urban areas, while 0.0% lived in rural areas.

There were 12,141 households in Vero Beach South, of which 22.4% had children under the age of 18 living in them. Of all households, 48.2% were married-couple households, 16.6% were households with a male householder and no spouse or partner present, and 28.8% were households with a female householder and no spouse or partner present. About 29.7% of all households were made up of individuals and 17.0% had someone living alone who was 65 years of age or older.

There were 13,479 housing units, of which 9.9% were vacant. The homeowner vacancy rate was 2.0% and the rental vacancy rate was 6.6%.

Racial composition as of the 2020 census
| Race | Number | Percent |
|---|---|---|
| White | 22,262 | 79.5% |
| Black or African American | 1,461 | 5.2% |
| American Indian and Alaska Native | 83 | 0.3% |
| Asian | 564 | 2.0% |
| Native Hawaiian and Other Pacific Islander | 8 | 0.0% |
| Some other race | 1,050 | 3.7% |
| Two or more races | 2,592 | 9.3% |
| Hispanic or Latino (of any race) | 3,367 | 12.0% |

=== 2000 census ===
As of the 2000 census of 2000, there were 20,362 people, 8,649 households, and 5,881 families residing in the CDP. The population density was 1,969.8 inhabitants per square mile (760.5/km^{2}). There were 9,505 housing units at an average density of 919.5 per square mile (355.0/km^{2}). The racial makeup of the CDP was 94.18% White, 2.29% African American, 0.32% Native American, 0.94% Asian, 0.07% Pacific Islander, 0.79% from other races, and 1.40% from two or more races. Hispanic or Latino of any race were 3.37% of the population.

There were 8,649 households, out of which 27.0% had children under the age of 18 living with them, 54.7% were married couples living together, 10.2% had a female householder with no husband present, and 32.0% were non-families. 26.8% of all households were made up of individuals, and 13.3% had someone living alone who was 65 years of age or older. The average household size was 2.34 and the average family size was 2.81.

In the CDP, the population was spread out, with 21.9% under the age of 18, 5.8% from 18 to 24, 25.3% from 25 to 44, 25.1% from 45 to 64, and 21.9% who were 65 years of age or older. The median age was 43 years. For every 100 females, there were 90.8 males. For every 100 females age 18 and over, there were 86.7 males.

The median income for a household in the CDP was $39,569, and the median income for a family was $46,664. Males had a median income of $32,079 versus $24,506 for females. The per capita income for the CDP was $21,604. About 4.6% of families and 7.6% of the population were below the poverty line, including 8.4% of those under age 18 and 7.9% of those age 65 or over.
