= Wabasso, Florida =

- Census-designated place
- Location in Indian River County and the state of Florida
- Coordinates: 27°45′18″N 80°26′36″W
- Country: United States
- State: Florida
- County: Indian River
- Named for: Ossabaw Island, Georgia

Area
  - Total: 3.69 sq mi (9.57 km^{2})
  - Land: 3.68 sq mi (9.54 km^{2})
  - Water: 0.0077 sq mi (0.02 km^{2})
- Elevation: 36 ft (11 m)

Population (2020)
  - Total: 1,627
  - Density: 441.5/sq mi (170.46/km^{2})
- Time zone: UTC-5 (Eastern (EST))
  - Summer (DST): UTC-4 (EDT)
- ZIP code: 32970
- Area code: 772
- FIPS code: 12-74625
- GNIS feature ID: 2402975

Wabasso is an unincorporated community and census-designated place (CDP) in Indian River County, Florida, United States. As of the 2020 census, Wabasso had a population of 1,627. It is located at the intersection of U.S. 1 and SR 510.

Wabasso is part of the Sebastian–Vero Beach Metropolitan Statistical Area.

== History ==
A post office called Wabasso has been in operation since 1898. The name Wabasso is derived from Ossabaw, Georgia, with the spelling reversed.

== Geography ==
Wabasso is located in northeastern Indian River County. It is bordered to the north by Sebastian and to the south by Winter Beach. To the east, across the tidal Indian River, is Wabasso Beach. U.S. Route 1 leads south from Wabasso 8 miles (13 km) to Vero Beach, the county seat, and north 26 miles (42 km) to Melbourne.

According to the United States Census Bureau, the Wabasso CDP has a total area of 2.4 square miles (6.3 km^{2}), all land.

== Demographics ==
Historical population
Census	Pop.	Note	%±
2020	1,627		—
U.S. Decennial Census

=== 2020 census ===
As of the 2020 census, Wabasso had a population of 1,627. The median age was 55.1 years. 17.1% of residents were under the age of 18 and 30.2% of residents were 65 years of age or older. For every 100 females there were 99.4 males, and for every 100 females age 18 and over there were 102.4 males age 18 and over.

91.8% of residents lived in urban areas, while 8.2% lived in rural areas.

There were 675 households in Wabasso, of which 18.8% had children under the age of 18 living in them. Of all households, 50.1% were married-couple households, 19.6% were households with a male householder and no spouse or partner present, and 22.4% were households with a female householder and no spouse or partner present. About 25.5% of all households were made up of individuals and 14.2% had someone living alone who was 65 years of age or older.

There were 821 housing units, of which 17.8% were vacant. The homeowner vacancy rate was 4.2% and the rental vacancy rate was 10.1%.

Racial composition as of the 2020 census
Race	Number	Percent
White	1,004	61.7%
Black or African American	400	24.6%
American Indian and Alaska Native	8	0.5%
Asian	28	1.7%
Native Hawaiian and Other Pacific Islander	0	0.0%
Some other race	56	3.4%
Two or more races	131	8.1%
Hispanic or Latino (of any race)	142	8.7%

=== 2000 census ===
As of the census of 2000, there were 918 people, 403 households, and 214 families residing in the CDP. The population density was 378.8 inhabitants per square mile (146.3/km^{2}). There were 526 housing units at an average density of 217.1 units per square mile (83.8 units/km^{2}). The racial makeup of the CDP was 2.90% White, 95.56% African American, 0.65% Native American, 1.42% Asian, 7.41% from other races, and 2.07% from two or more races. Hispanic or Latino of any race were 12.75% of the population.

There were 403 households, out of which 20.1% had children under the age of 18 living with them, 40.7% were married couples living together, 9.4% had a female householder with no husband present, and 46.7% were non-families. 36.7% of all households were made up of individuals, and 13.9% had someone living alone who was 65 years of age or older. The average household size was 2.23 and the average family size was 2.87.

In the CDP, the population was spread out, with 19.7% under the age of 18, 5.0% from 18 to 24, 29.5% from 25 to 44, 27.7% from 45 to 64, and 18.1% who were 65 years of age or older. The median age was 42 years. For every 100 females, there were 120.1 males. For every 100 females age 18 and over, there were 126.8 males.

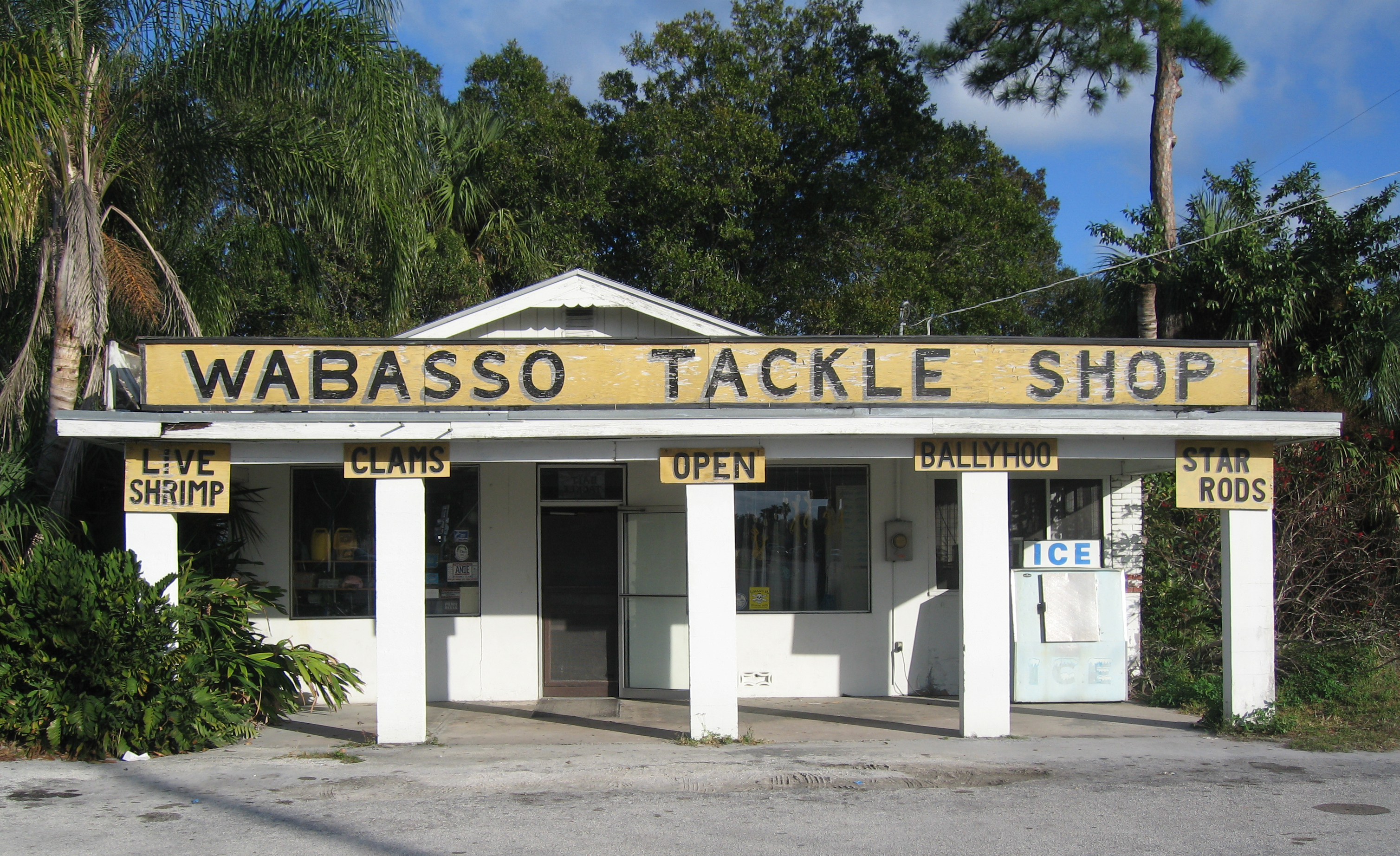
Wabasso Tackle Shop (area landmark)

The median income for a household in the CDP was $25,938, and the median income for a family was $25,815. Males had a median income of $21,188 versus $25,417 for females. The per capita income for the CDP was $18,557. About 17.2% of families and 25.9% of the population were below the poverty line, including 51.5% of those under age 18 and 15.6% of those age 65 or over.

== Notable person ==
- Poet, critic and essayist Laura Riding and her husband Schuyler B. Jackson lived in Wabasso from approximately 1941 until his death in 1968, and she remained a resident until her death on September 2, 1991.

== See also ==
- List of geographic names derived from anagrams and ananyms
