= Sebastian, Florida =

- City
- City of Sebastian
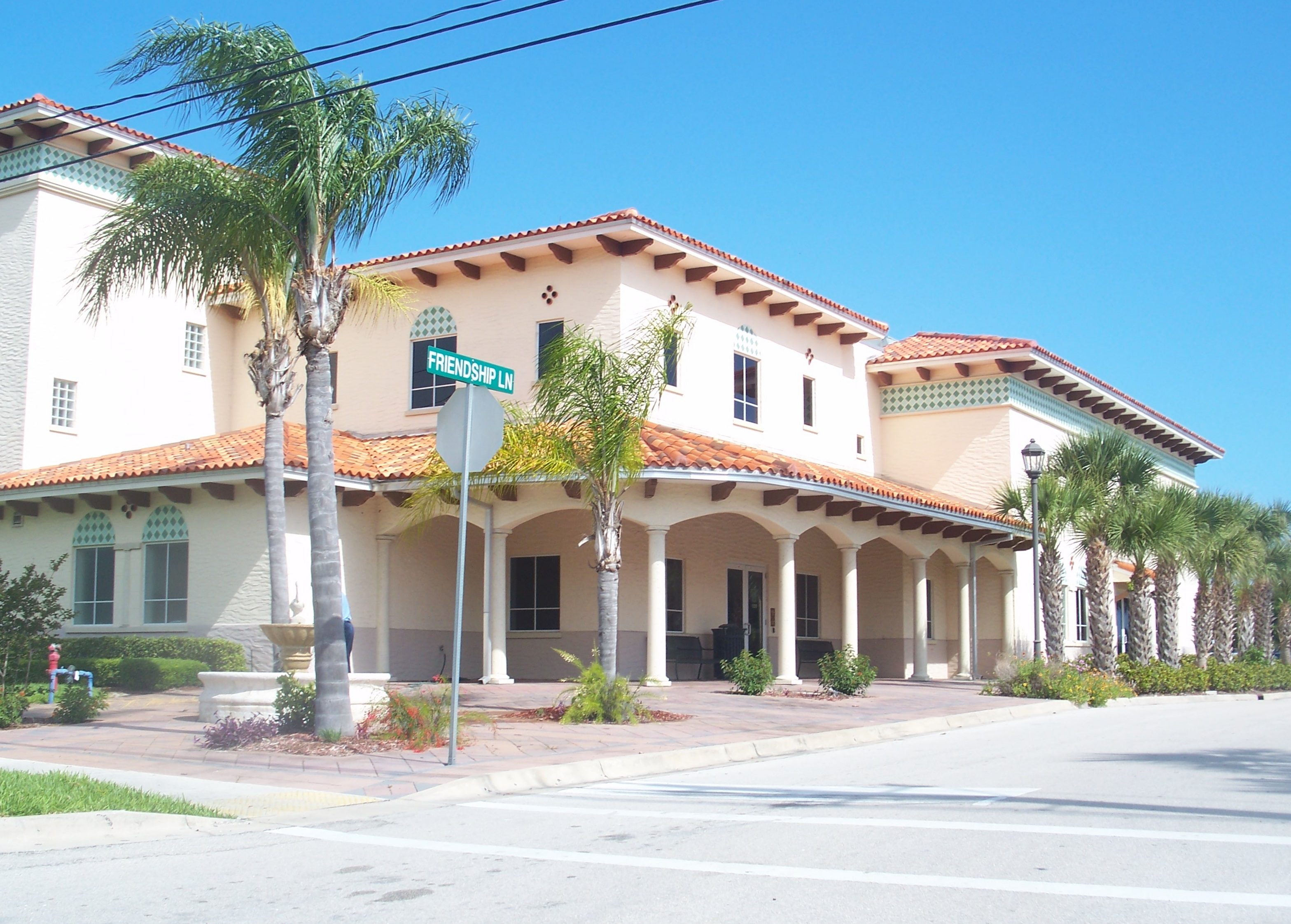
- City hall

- Logo
- Mottoes: "Home Of Pelican Island" "Friendly People and Six Old Grouches"
- Location in Indian River County and the state of Florida
- Coordinates: 27°46′40″N 80°29′36″W
- Country: United States
- State: Florida
- County: Indian River
- Settled: 1870s
- First settlers: Andrew Canova, Ed Marr, Thomas New, and David Peter Gibson
- Incorporated (municipality): Dec. 6, 1924
- Incorporated (city): May 18, 1925

Government
  - Type: Council-manager government

Area
  - Total: 14.84 sq mi (38.44 km^{2})
  - Land: 14.00 sq mi (36.26 km^{2})
  - Water: 0.84 sq mi (2.18 km^{2})
- Elevation: 20 ft (6.1 m)

Population (2020)
  - Total: 25,054
  - Density: 1,789.7/sq mi (691.02/km^{2})
- Time zone: UTC−5 (Eastern (EST))
  - Summer (DST): UTC−4 (EDT)
- ZIP Codes: 32958, 32978
- Area code: 772
- FIPS code: 12-64825
- GNIS feature ID: 2405438
- Website: City of Sebastian Florida

Sebastian is the most populous city in Indian River County, Florida. It is located at the confluence of the St. Sebastian River and the Indian River. It is located near the Pelican Island National Wildlife Refuge just inland of the Atlantic Ocean.

As of the 2020 census, Sebastian had a population of 25,054.

Sebastian is a principal city of the Sebastian−Vero Beach Metropolitan Statistical Area, which includes all of Indian River County.

== History ==
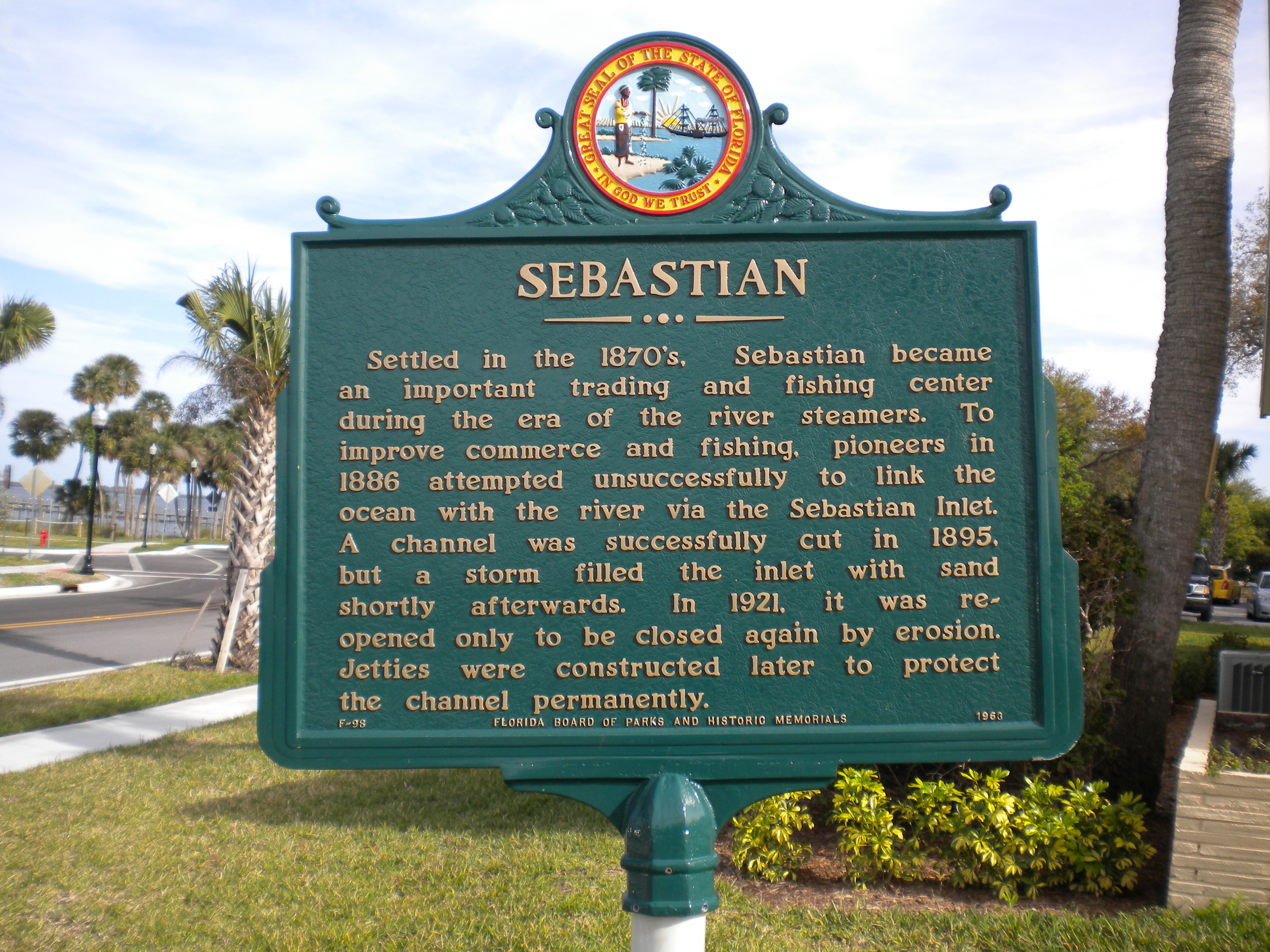
Sebastian Historical Marker

In 1715, several Spanish ships loaded with treasure (known as the 1715 Treasure Fleet) encountered a storm off the shores of the Treasure Coast and were lost. It is estimated that only a portion of the sunken treasure has been found. The value placed on the treasure lost from the 1715 fleet has been estimated at more than US$500 million. A significant portion of the treasure was discovered by Mel Fisher, who established a permanent museum in Sebastian in 1992.

According to the 1860 United States census, there were only two named individuals, both farmers, listed as living in the Sebastian River area. The town of Sebastian was a fishing village as early as the 1870s. In the early 1880s David Peter Gibson and Thomas New settled in the area. New filed to start a post office under the name New Haven. However, New got into legal trouble for misuse of his position as postmaster and was removed. Officially, Sebastian was founded in 1882 and named St. Sebastian, after Saint Sebastian. Later, “St.” was removed from the name of the town, but not from the river. Sebastian was incorporated as a city in 1923.

Nearby Pelican Island was declared the first National Wildlife Refuge in the United States in 1903.

An historical society focusing on Sebastian was organized in 1985, and a museum was planned to be situated in an old railroad station, but it now resides inside the 1927 Historic Sebastian Public School.

== Geography ==
According to the United States Census Bureau, the city has a total land area of 13.66 square miles (35.4 km^{2}).

=== Climate ===
Climate data for Sebastian
Month	Jan	Feb	Mar	Apr	May	Jun	Jul	Aug	Sep	Oct	Nov	Dec	Year
Record high °F (°C)	88 (31)	90 (32)	92 (33)	95 (35)	99 (37)	98 (37)	102 (39)	97 (36)	99 (37)	93 (34)	90 (32)	90 (32)	102 (39)
Mean daily maximum °F (°C)	73 (23)	74 (23)	77 (25)	80 (27)	85 (29)	88 (31)	89 (32)	89 (32)	87 (31)	83 (28)	77 (25)	73 (23)	81 (27)
Mean daily minimum °F (°C)	54 (12)	56 (13)	59 (15)	64 (18)	68 (20)	72 (22)	74 (23)	74 (23)	74 (23)	69 (21)	62 (17)	56 (13)	65 (18)
Record low °F (°C)	24 (−4)	29 (−2)	26 (−3)	37 (3)	46 (8)	55 (13)	62 (17)	63 (17)	61 (16)	44 (7)	31 (−1)	24 (−4)	24 (−4)
Average precipitation inches (mm)	2.1 (53)	2.2 (56)	3.5 (89)	3.5 (89)	3.6 (91)	5.1 (130)	5.8 (150)	6.0 (150)	9.1 (230)	7.1 (180)	2.4 (61)	1.6 (41)	52 (1,320)

== Demographics ==
Historical population
Census	Pop.	Note	%±
1930	386		—
1940	425		10.1%
1950	376		−11.5%
1960	698		85.6%
1970	825		18.2%
1980	2,831		243.2%
1990	10,205		260.5%
2000	16,181		58.6%
2010	21,929		35.5%
2020	25,054		14.3%
U.S. Decennial Census

=== Racial and ethnic composition ===
Sebastian racial composition (Hispanics excluded from racial categories) (NH = Non-Hispanic)
Race	Pop 2010	Pop 2020	% 2010	% 2020
White (NH)	18,695	20,376	85.25%	81.33%
Black or African American (NH)	1,120	1,143	5.11%	4.56%
Native American or Alaska Native (NH)	42	39	0.19%	0.16%
Asian (NH)	252	337	1.15%	1.35%
Pacific Islander or Native Hawaiian (NH)	5	5	0.02%	0.02%
Some other race (NH)	30	71	0.14%	0.28%
Two or more races/Multiracial (NH)	260	854	1.19%	3.41%
Hispanic or Latino (any race)	1,525	2,229	6.95%	8.90%
Total	21,929	25,054		

=== 2020 census ===
As of the 2020 census, Sebastian had a population of 25,054. The median age was 57.1 years. 14.1% of residents were under the age of 18 and 34.5% of residents were 65 years of age or older. For every 100 females there were 92.0 males, and for every 100 females age 18 and over there were 90.4 males age 18 and over.

99.9% of residents lived in urban areas, while 0.1% lived in rural areas.

There were 11,179 households in Sebastian, of which 19.1% had children under the age of 18 living in them. Of all households, 53.0% were married-couple households, 15.2% were households with a male householder and no spouse or partner present, and 25.0% were households with a female householder and no spouse or partner present. About 25.7% of all households were made up of individuals and 16.0% had someone living alone who was 65 years of age or older.

There were 12,192 housing units, of which 8.3% were vacant. The homeowner vacancy rate was 2.1% and the rental vacancy rate was 5.9%.

Racial composition as of the 2020 census
Race	Number	Percent
White	20,932	83.5%
Black or African American	1,182	4.7%
American Indian and Alaska Native	53	0.2%
Asian	341	1.4%
Native Hawaiian and Other Pacific Islander	6	0.0%
Some other race	570	2.3%
Two or more races	1,970	7.9%
Hispanic or Latino (of any race)	2,229	8.9%

According to the Census Bureau's QuickFacts, the average household size was 2.39. Females comprised 51.6% of the population and males 48.4%. The median household income was $54,986 and the per capita income was $32,400, with 10.6% of residents below the poverty line.

=== 2010 census ===
As of the 2010 United States census, there were 21,929 people, 9,114 households, and 6,319 families residing in the city.

== Government ==
The Government of the City of Sebastian follows a council-manager government model with a five-member city council as the elected governing body and a city manager as the chief operating officer. Members of the city council serve two-year terms with staggered elections.

== Public safety ==
=== Fire Rescue ===
Indian River County Fire-Rescue provides fire protection and emergency medical services to the citizens of Sebastian. There are two fire stations assigned to the city:

- Station 8: Engine 8, Rescue 8, Battalion 1.
- Station 9: Quint 9, Rescue 9.

=== Police Department ===
The Sebastian Police Department provides police protection for the city. It operates from the municipal complex, and has an authorized strength of approximately 48 sworn officers.

== Education ==
The School District of Indian River County operates public schools.

There are three elementary schools (Sebastian Elementary, Pelican Island Elementary and Treasure Coast Elementary,) two middle schools (Sebastian River Middle School and Sebastian Charter Junior High) and one high school (Sebastian River High School) in the city.

Located to the west of the city center on County Road 512, the North County Public Library is part of the Indian River County Library System.

== Transportation ==
The GoLine Bus system operates buses out of the North County Transit Hub at 90th Avenue & Sebastian Blvd to various parts of Indian River County.

== Notable people ==
- Bryan Augenstein, pitcher in Major League Baseball in 2009 and 2011; born in Sebastian
- G. Holmes Braddock, American politician
- Jim Gary, American sculptor, was born in Sebastian
- Arlo Guthrie, American folk singer-songwriter
- Paul Kroegel, American conservationist

== See also ==
- Ais people
- Alvaro Mexia
- Bartram Trail
- Robert A. Hardee
