= List of county roads in St. Lucie County, Florida =

- County road shields used in Florida

Highway names
- County: County Road X (CR X)

System links
- Florida State Highway System; Interstate; US; State; Former; Pre‑1945; Toll; Scenic

County Roads in St. Lucie County, Florida are maintained by the county's Public Works Department. Most routes are signed according to the Manual on Uniform Traffic Control Devices using standard yellow-on-blue route markers. North-south routes are generally odd numbers and east-west routes are generally even numbers.

While routes for Florida state roads are assigned by the Florida Department of Transportation (FDOT), county roads numbers are assigned by the counties, with guidance from FDOT. North-south routes are generally assigned odd numbers, while east-west routes are generally assigned even numbers.

== County Road 68 ==
County Road 68
- Location: near Okeechobee–Fort Pierce
- Length: 17.1 mi (27.5 km)

County Road 68 is a western extension of SR 68 along Orange Avenue from SR 713 just outside Fort Pierce to the Okeechobee County line; the County Road 68 designations continues west into Okeechobee County to US 441. The entire roadway was formerly designated SR 68.

Both segments of CR 68 and SR 68 are part of the historical Florida Cracker Trail.

== County Road 603 ==
County Road 603
- Location: near Fort Pierce North–Lakewood Park
- Length: 6.8 mi (10.9 km)

County Road 603 is Johnson Road west of Lakewood Park, from CR 607A north to the Indian River County line, where it continues north as CR 611. The section north of SR 611 has a posted speed limit of 55 miles per hour (89 km/h).

The road was formerly designated SR 603.

Location	mi	km	Destinations	Notes
	0.0	0.0	CR 607A (Angle Road)	
	4.3	6.9	SR 614 (Indiro Road)	
Lakewood Park	6.8	10.9	CR 611 north	Continuation into Indian River County
1.000 mi = 1.609 km; 1.000 km = 0.621 mi

== County Road 605 ==
County Road 605
- Location: River Park–near Oslo
- Length: 14.5 mi (23.3 km)

County Road 605 exists in two segments, both parallel to US 1. The southern segment is Oleander Avenue, Oleander Boulevard, and Sunrise Boulevard from Beach Avenue in River Park to US 1 in Fort Pierce. Filling the gap via US 1, the designation resumes along Old Dixie Highway north to the Indian River County line, where it continues north as CR 605.

Both segments of the road was formerly designated SR 605.

Location	mi	km	Destinations	Notes
River Park	0.0	0.0	Beach Avenue	
White City	2.8	4.5	CR 712 (Midway Road)	
Fort Pierce South	5.3	8.5	CR 611 (Edwards Road)	
Fort Pierce	6.4	10.3	SR 70 (Virginia Avenue) to I-95 / US 1	
Fort Pierce	7.4	11.9	US 1 (SR 5)	
Fort Pierce	Gap in route			
Fort Pierce	7.4	11.9	US 1	Road is unsigned SR 5
Fort Pierce	8.0	12.9	SR A1A	
	9.0	14.5	CR 608 west (St. Lucie Blvd.)	Eastern terminus of CR 608
	11.7	18.8	CR 614 west (Indrio Road)	Eastern terminus of CR 614
	14.5	23.3	CR 605 north	Continuation into Indian River County
1.000 mi = 1.609 km; 1.000 km = 0.621 mi

== County Road 607A ==
County Road 607A
- Location: near Fort Pierce North–Fort Pierce
- Length: 4.5 mi (7.2 km)

County Road 607A is Angle Road from SR 713 near Fort Pierce North to SR 68 in Fort Pierce.

The road was formerly designated SR 607A.

Location	mi	km	Destinations	Notes
	0.0	0.0	CR 603 north (Johnson Road)	Southern terminus of CR 603
	1.3	2.1	SR 713 (Kings Highway) to Florida's Turnpike	
Fort Pierce North	2.3	3.7	CR 611 north (Keen Road)	Southern terminus of CR 611
Fort Pierce	4.5	7.2	SR 68 (Orange Avenue)	
1.000 mi = 1.609 km; 1.000 km = 0.621 mi

== County Road 608 ==
County Road 608
- Location: Fort Pierce North–St. Lucie
- Length: 3.3 mi (5.3 km)

County Road 608 is St. Lucie Boulevard in Fort Pierce North and St. Lucie, from King's Highway (SR 713) east to CR 707.

The entire road was formerly designated SR 608, a designation which still exists for 0.5 miles (0.80 km) between 25th Street (SR 615) and US 1.

== County Road 609 ==
County Road 609
- Location: Port St. Lucie–near Fort Pierce
- Length: 11.2 mi (18.0 km)

County Road 609 in St. Lucie County currently exists in two segments. The southern segment is the designation of Range Line Road north from the Martin County line (Range Line Road south of the Martin County line continues as Martin County Road 609) to CR 709 (Glades Cutoff Road) just west of Port St. Lucie. The northern segment is Header Canal Road west of Fort Pierce, from SR 70 to its northern terminus at its intersection with CR 68 (Orange Avenue).

Both sections of the road were formerly designated SR 609.

Location	mi	km	Destinations	Notes
Port St. Lucie	0.0	0.0	CR 609 south (Range Line Road)	CR 609 designation continues south into Martin County
Port St. Lucie	6.1	9.8	CR 709 (Glades Cutoff Road)	Northern terminus of southern segment of CR 609
Gap in route
	6.1	9.8	SR 70 (Okeechobee Road) to Florida's Turnpike / I-95	Southern terminus of northern segment of CR 609
	11.2	18.0	CR 68 (Orange Avenue) to Florida's Turnpike / I-95	Northern terminus of CR 609
1.000 mi = 1.609 km; 1.000 km = 0.621 mi

== County Road 609A ==
County Road 609A
- Location: near White City–near Fort Pierce
- Length: 5.1 mi (8.2 km)

County Road 609A is Shinn Road from CR 712 west of White City to CR 68 west of Fort Pierce.

The road was formerly SR 609A.

Location	mi	km	Destinations	Notes
	0.0	0.0	CR 712 (Midway Road)	Continues south without designation
	0.4	0.64	SR 70 (Okeechobee Road)	
	5.1	8.2	CR 68 (Orange Avenue)	
1.000 mi = 1.609 km; 1.000 km = 0.621 mi

== County Road 611 ==
County Road 611
- Location: Fort Pierce–Fort Pierce North
- Length: 7.3 mi (11.7 km)

County Road 611 is Jenkins Road and Edwards Road in Fort Pierce from US 1 to SR 68. Following a gap in the route, the designation resumes for one mile of Keene Road near St. Lucie County Airport from CR 607A to CR 608.

The Jenkins Road section was formerly SR 611 and the Edwards Road section was formerly SR 611B.

Location	mi	km	Destinations	Notes
Fort Pierce	0.0	0.0	US 1	Unsigned SR 5
Fort Pierce	0.5	0.80	CR 605 (Oleander Avenue)	
Fort Pierce South	1.5	2.4	SR 615 north / CR 615 south (25th Street)	Termini of SR 615 and CR 615
Fort Pierce South	2.5	4.0	CR 611B south (Selvitz Road)	Northern terminus of CR 611B
Fort Pierce	4.2	6.8	SR 70 (Okeechobee Road) to I-95 / Florida's Turnpike	
	6.3	10.1	SR 68 (Orange Avenue) / Jenkins Road north	Continues north without designation
Gap in route
Fort Pierce North	0.0	0.0	CR 607A (Angle Road)	
Fort Pierce North	1.0	1.6	CR 608 (St. Lucie Boulevard) – St. Lucie County Airport	
1.000 mi = 1.609 km; 1.000 km = 0.621 mi

== County Road 611B ==
County Road 611B
- Location: White City–Fort Pierce South
- Length: 2.3 mi (3.7 km)

County Road 611B is Selvitz Road from CR 712 in White City to CR 611 in Fort Pierce South.

The road was formerly SR 611B.

Location	mi	km	Destinations	Notes
White City	0.0	0.0	CR 712 (Midway Road) / Selvitz Road south	Continues south without designation
Fort Pierce	1.6	2.6	CR 709 south (Glades Cut Off Road)	Northern terminus of CR 709
Fort Pierce South	2.3	3.7	CR 611 (Edwards Road)	
1.000 mi = 1.609 km; 1.000 km = 0.621 mi

== County Road 613 ==
County Road 613
- Location: near Port St. Lucie–Fort Pierce
- Length: 14.7 mi (23.7 km)

County Road 613 runs from CR 709 west of Port St. Lucie north to CR 68 west of Fort Pierce. The road is split into two segments. The southern segment, Carlton Road, is not signed. The northern segment, Sneed Road, is signed. The two segments are connected by a short segment of SR 70.

The road was formerly designated SR 613.

Location	mi	km	Destinations	Notes
	0.0	0.0	CR 709 north (Glades Cut Off Road)	Southern terminus of CR 709
	9.1	14.6	SR 70 (Okeechobee Road)	
Gap in route
	9.1	14.6	SR 70 (Okeechobee Road)	
	14.7	23.7	CR 68 (Orange Avenue)	
1.000 mi = 1.609 km; 1.000 km = 0.621 mi

== County Road 614 ==
County Road 614
- Location: Lakewood Park
- Length: 2.8 mi (4.5 km)

County Road 614 is an eastern extension of SR 614 along Indrio Road in Lakewood Park, from SR 713 to CR 605.

== County Road 615 ==
County Road 615
- Location: Fort Pierce–Port St. Lucie
- Length: 10.1 mi (16.3 km)

County Road 615 is a southern extension of SR 615 along 25th Street, St. James Drive, and Airoso Boulevard, from CR 611 (Edwards Road) in Fort Pierce to SR 716 (Port St. Lucie Boulevard) in Port St. Lucie. County Road shields are nonexistent south of Edwards Road.

== County Road 707 ==
County Road 707
- Location: near Jensen Beach–Fort Pierce
- Length: 14.5 mi (23.3 km)

County Road 707 is the current designation of Indian River Drive in St. Lucie County from the Martin County line in Jensen Beach north to SR A1A in Fort Pierce. The entire road is bordered by the Florida East Coast Railway to the west and the Intracoastal Waterway coastline to the east. Indian River Drive was formerly SR 707.

Location	mi	km	Destinations	Notes
Jensen Beach	0.0	0.0	CR 707 south	Intersection with County Line Road; Road continues south into Martin County as CR 707
White City	9	14	CR 712 west (Midway Road) to US 1 (SR 5)	
Fort Pierce	14.5	23.3	SR A1A (Seaway Drive) to US 1 (SR 5)	Northern end of CR 707
1.000 mi = 1.609 km; 1.000 km = 0.621 mi

== County Road 709 ==
County Road 709
- Location: near Port St. Lucie–Fort Pierce
- Length: 14.2 mi (22.9 km)

County Road 709 is the designation of Glades Cut Off Road from its intersection with CR 613 west of Port St. Lucie northeast to CR 611B in Fort Pierce. The roadway parallels the South Central Florida Express, Inc., rail line for its entire length. North of Midway Road, CR 709 provides access to, among other industries, Tropicana's Fort Pierce juice processing plant, the St. Lucie County Landfill, and a Walmart Distribution Center.

The road was formerly designated SR 709.

Location	mi	km	Destinations	Notes
	0.0	0.0	CR 613 north (Carlton Road) / Glades Cut Off Road south	Continues south to a dead end; southern terminus of CR 613
Port St. Lucie	4.2	6.8	CR 609 south (Range Line Road)	Northern terminus of CR 609
Port St. Lucie	11.9	19.2	CR 712 (Midway Road) to I-95	
Fort Pierce	14.2	22.9	CR 611B (Selvitz Road) to CR 611	Northern terminus of CR 709
1.000 mi = 1.609 km; 1.000 km = 0.621 mi

== County Road 712 ==
County Road 712
- Location: near Port St. Lucie–Indian River Estates
- Length: 11.9 mi (19.2 km)
- Existed: late 1970s–present

County Road 712 is Midway Road, an east–west road providing one of the few access points to I-95 within the county. The western terminus is an intersection with Okeechobee Road (SR 70) west of Port St. Lucie; the eastern terminus of CR 712 is an intersection with Indian River Drive (CR 707) on the western edge of the Indian River near Indian River Estates. In addition to the communities on and near the termini of CR 712, the former State Road serves Collins Park Estates, Indian River Estates and White City.

The road was formerly designated SR 712, and was one of the first of a collection of State Roads in southern Florida that was transferred back to county control and maintenance in the late 1970s to mid-1980s. Since then, the growing population of Port St. Lucie has resulted in increased urbanization along much of the route, with Midway Road between US1 and Selvitz Road being widened from a two lane roadway to a four lane divided highway.

About 1988, after SR 712 was transferred to county control, Florida Department of Transportation designated two short spurs of the former State Road as State Road 712A (McCarty Road between CR 712 and SR 70) and State Road 712B (Seven Mile Road, also between CR 712 and SR 70). Both spurs lost their signage and their places in the road maps in the mid-to-late 1990s. Neither was subsequently given a County Road designation, although some road maps do apply these roads with a County Road designation.

Location	mi	km	Destinations	Notes
	0.0	0.0	SR 70 (Okeechobee Road) to Florida's Turnpike / I-95	
	0.9	1.4	CR 609A north (Shinn Road) to SR 70	Southern terminus of CR 609A
	2.4	3.9	CR 712A north (McCarty Road)	Southern terminus of CR 712A
	2.9	4.7	CR 712B north (11 Mile Road)	Southern terminus of CR 712B
Port St. Lucie	4.8	7.7	I-95 – Daytona Beach, West Palm Beach	Exit 126 on I-95 (SR 9)
Port St. Lucie	5.8	9.3	CR 709 (Glades Cut Off Road)	
Port St. Lucie	7.4	11.9	CR 611B north (Selvitz Road) to CR 611	Southern terminus of CR 611B; Selvitz Road continues south into Port St. Lucie without designation
White City	8.4	13.5	CR 615 (25th Street/St. James Drive)	
White City	9.4	15.1	CR 605 (Oleander Avenue)	
Indian River Estates	9.9	15.9	US 1	Unsigned SR 5
Indian River Estates	11.9	19.2	CR 707 (Indian River Drive)	
1.000 mi = 1.609 km; 1.000 km = 0.621 mi

== County Road 770 ==
County Road 770
- Location: Fort Pierce
- Length: 3.0 mi (4.8 km)

County Road 770 is Okeechobee Road and Delaware Avenue in Fort Pierce, forking from SR 70 and proceeding through downtown to US 1.

The road was formerly part of SR 70, which was realigned to follow Virginia Avenue east from Okeechobee Road to US 1.

Location	mi	km	Destinations	Notes
Fort Pierce	0.0	0.0	SR 70 west	Okeechobee Road continues west as SR 70
Fort Pierce	1.5	2.4	SR 615 (25th Street)	
Fort Pierce	3.0	4.8	US 1 (SR 5)	
1.000 mi = 1.609 km; 1.000 km = 0.621 mi
