= Florida State Road 615 =

State highway in Florida, United States

State Road 615 and County Road 615
- County Road 615; 25th Street
- SR 615 in red, CR 615 in blue

Route information
- Maintained by FDOT and St. Lucie County
- Length: 16.268 mi (26.181 km) 6.168 miles (9.926 km) as SR 615

Major junctions
- South end: SR 716 in Port St. Lucie
- CR 770 in Fort Pierce*. SR 70 in Fort Pierce: SR 68 in Fort Pierce
- North end: US 1 in St. Lucie Village

Location
- Country: United States
- State: Florida
- County: St. Lucie

Highway system
- Florida State Highway System; Interstate; US; State; Former; Pre‑1945; Toll; Scenic
← SR 614	→ SR 616

State Road 615 (SR 615), locally known as 25th Street, is a 6.2-mile-long (10.0 km) north–south commuter road serving St. Lucie County, Florida. Its northern terminus is an intersection with U.S. Route 1 (US 1 or SR 5) northeast of the St. Lucie County Airport in St. Lucie Village. SR 615 continues south along 25th Street, intersecting with Okeechobee Road (CR 770) and Virginia Avenue (SR 70) before the state road designation ends at its intersection with Edwards Road (CR 611). County Road 615 (CR 615) begins here (albeit unsigned) and extends 10.1 miles (16.3 km) south to Port St. Lucie. At Midway Road (CR 712), the road changes names from 25th Street to St. James Drive. After winding its way through northern Port St. Lucie, St. James Drive ends at an intersection with Airoso Boulevard, with the CR 615 designation continuing south along Airoso Boulevard. After intersections with Prima Vista Boulevard and Crosstown Parkway, CR 615 and Airoso Blvd. finally reaches its southern terminus with Port St. Lucie Blvd. (SR 716), where Port St. Lucie's City Hall is located.

No county route signage exists south of Edwards Road in Fort Pierce.

== Major intersections ==
The entire route is in St. Lucie County.

Location	mi	km	Destinations	Notes
Port St. Lucie	0.0	0.0	SR 716 (Port St. Lucie Boulevard) to US 1 / Florida's Turnpike	
White City	7.6	12.2	CR 712 (Midway Road) to US 1 / I-95	
Fort Pierce South	10.1 0.000	16.3 0.000	CR 611 (Edwards Road)	Transition from CR 615 to SR 615
Fort Pierce	0.991	1.595	SR 70 (Virginia Avenue) to I-95 / US 1 / Florida's Turnpike	
Fort Pierce	1.796	2.890	CR 770 (Okeechobee Road)	Former routing of SR 70
Fort Pierce	2.496	4.017	SR 68 (Orange Avenue)	
Fort Pierce North	5.016	8.072	SR 608 east / CR 608 west (St. Lucie Boulevard) – Airport	Termini of SR 608 and CR 608
St. Lucie Village	6.168	9.926	US 1	Road is unsigned SR 5
1.000 mi = 1.609 km; 1.000 km = 0.621 mi: Route transition
