= Florida State Road 608 =

Highway in Florida

State Road 608 and County Road 608
- St. Lucie Boulevard
- SR 608 in red, CR 608 in blue

Route information
- Maintained by FDOT and St. Lucie County
- Length: 4.169 mi (6.709 km) 0.569 miles (0.916 km) as SR 608

Major junctions
- West end: SR 713 near Fort Pierce North
- US 1 in Fort Pierce North
- East end: CR 605 in St. Lucie Village

Location
- Country: United States
- State: Florida
- County: St. Lucie

Highway system
- Florida State Highway System; Interstate; US; State; Former; Pre‑1945; Toll; Scenic
← SR 607	→ SR 614

State Road 608 (SR 608) is a 0.57-mile-long (0.92 km) east–west street serving the area north of Fort Pierce in St. Lucie County, Florida. Locally known as St. Lucie Boulevard, the road extends westward and eastward as County Road 608 (CR 608).

Its current western terminus is SR 713. The road becomes SR 608 at an intersection with SR 615, and the eastern terminus is an intersection with U.S. Route 1 (US 1 and SR 5), where the CR 608 designation resumes for one block to Dixie Highway (CR 605) in the Hunt Subdivision.

== History ==
Originally, SR 608 extended westward another 3 miles (4.8 km), terminating at Kings Highway (SR 713), a heavily used two-lane road connecting Florida's Turnpike (SR 91) with US 1. This is now County Road 608, which serves the St. Lucie County Airport.

== Major intersections ==
The entire route is in St. Lucie County.

Location	mi	km	Destinations	Notes
	0.0	0.0	SR 713 (Kings Highway) to I-95	
Fort Pierce North	1.0	1.6	CR 611 south (Keen Road)	Northern terminus of CR 611
Fort Pierce North	3.0 0.000	4.8 0.000	SR 615 (25th Street)	Transition from CR 608 to SR 608
Fort Pierce North	0.569 0.0	0.916 0.0	US 1	Unsigned SR 5; transition from SR 608 to CR 608
St. Lucie	0.2	0.32	CR 605 (Indian River Drive)	
1.000 mi = 1.609 km; 1.000 km = 0.621 mi: Route transition
