= Florida State Road 614 =

Highway in Florida, United States

State Road 614 and County Road 614
- Indrio Road
- SR 614 in red, CR 614 in blue

Route information
- Maintained by FDOT and St. Lucie County
- Length: 6.384 mi (10.274 km) 3.584 miles (5.768 km) as SR 614

Major junctions
- West end: I-95 near Lakewood Park
- SR 713 in Lakewood Park; US 1 in Lakewood Park
- East end: CR 605 near Lakewood Park

Location
- Country: United States
- State: Florida
- County: St. Lucie

Highway system
- Florida State Highway System; Interstate; US; State; Former; Pre‑1945; Toll; Scenic
← SR 608	→ SR 615

State Road 614 (SR 614), locally known as Indrio Road, is an American 3.6-mile-long (5.8 km) east–west street serving a rural section of northern St. Lucie County, Florida, just south of Lakewood Park. The road has a 2.8 miles (4.5 km) eastern extension designated County Road 614 (CR 614).

== Route description ==
Indrio Road's current western terminus is an interchange with Interstate 95 (I-95 or SR 9); its current eastern terminus is an intersection with Kings Highway (SR 713). Indrio Road actually terminates just east of U.S. Route 1 (US 1) at Old Dixie Highway (CR 605). Most of the road passes through orange groves and pastureland.

== History ==
Over the years, different parts of Indrio Road had different state road designations. A 1960 map prepared by State Road Department (forerunner of the Florida Department of Transportation) showed Indrio Road between Emerson Road (present SR 607) and US 1 as State Road 607—at the same time the designation as also applied to Emerson Road and Kings Highway (current SR 713). By the end of the decade, Kings Highway was renumbered SR 713, but Indrio Road remained SR 607 until the 1970s, when the portion west of Kings Highway became SR 614 (which was later extended to Interstate 95 upon the opening of an I-95 interchange with Indrio Road). When SR 614 was extended westward, the section east of SR 713 was redesignated State Road 617 despite its east–west alignment. Eventually, SR 617 gave way to County Road 614 as FDOT returned the route to county maintenance and control.

The importance of SR 614 was at its height in the time in which I-95 had an "interruption" and motorists traveling between Florida's Turnpike and I-95 used Kings Highway and Indrio Road to "bridge" the connection between the two major expressways. As sections of I-95 were completed between Osceola Boulevard (SR 60) near Vero Beach and Okeechobee Road (SR 70) in Fort Pierce from 1978 to 1980, the common methodology of using SR 713 to travel between I-95 and the Turnpike evolved:

• Until early 1978, northbound motorists turned west onto Indrio Road (SR 614) and north onto Emerson Avenue (SR 607) one mile (1.6 km) to the west. After 8.5 miles (13.7 km) of Emerson Avenue, northbound motorists turned west onto SR 60, which connected with I-95 six miles (10 km) from SR 607.

• When a nine-mile (14 km)-long section of I-95 opened in 1978, northbound motorists stayed on Indrio Road (SR 614) after turning left from Kings Highway (SR 713). The then-new I-95 interchange was three miles (5 km) to the west of SR 713 on Indrio Road.

• When an additional six miles (10 km) of I-95 were opened in late 1978, motorists were directed 0.3 miles (0.48 km) eastward on Orange Avenue (SR 68) from SR 713 to connect with I-95. Most stayed with this route after a two-mile (3 km)-long section (to SR 70) was opened in early 1979, even though Florida Department of Transportation posted signs encouraging them to avoid SR 713 altogether and use SR 70. The final segment of I-95 to be finished in Florida (Stuart to Palm Beach Gardens) was finally opened in 1987.

== Major intersections ==
The entire route is in St. Lucie County.

Location	mi	km	Destinations	Notes
	0.000	0.000	Indrio Road west	Continues west to a dead end
	0.36	0.58	I-95 – Daytona Beach, West Palm Beach	Exit 138 on I-95 (SR 9)
	1.563	2.515	CR 603 (Johnston Road)	Former SR 603
	2.583	4.157	SR 607 north (Emerson Avenue)	Southern terminus of SR 607
Lakewood Park	3.584 0.0	5.768 0.0	SR 713 (Kings Highway) – Airport	Transition from SR 614 to CR 614
Lakewood Park	2.6	4.2	US 1	Road is unsigned SR 5
	2.8	4.5	CR 605 (Old Dixie Highway)	Former routing of Dixie Highway
1.000 mi = 1.609 km; 1.000 km = 0.621 mi: Route transition
