= Fort Pierce (disambiguation) =

Fort Pierce may refer to:

- Fort Pierce, Florida, city in St. Lucie County, Florida
- Fort Pierce North, Florida, a census designated place in St. Lucie County, Florida
- Fort Pierce South, Florida, a census designated place in St. Lucie County, Florida
- Fort Pierce (Alabama), War of 1812 fort in Baldwin County, Alabama
- Old Fort Pierce Park, historical site of the former U. S. Army fort in St. Lucie County, Florida
