= Treasure Coast =

Region in Florida

Coordinates: 27.5452°N 80.3884°W

Martin, St. Lucie, and Indian River counties

The Treasure Coast is a region in the east of the U.S. state of Florida. It borders the Atlantic Ocean and comprises Indian River, Martin, and St. Lucie counties. The name, which refers to the Spanish Treasure Fleet that was lost in a 1715 hurricane, evidently emerged from residents' desire to distinguish themselves from the Gold Coast to the south (the coast along Palm Beach, Broward, and Miami-Dade counties). The Treasure Coast was the most severely affected by Hurricanes Frances and Jeanne in 2004, with the damage from the storms exceeding $7 billion (2004 USD).

The Treasure Coast area includes parts of two metropolitan statistical areas (MSAs) designated by the Office of Management and Budget and used for statistical purposes by the Census Bureau and other agencies: the Port St. Lucie MSA (comprising St. Lucie and Martin counties) and the Sebastian–Vero Beach, Florida MSA (comprising Indian River County).

== History ==
The area has long been inhabited, but like other of Florida's vernacular regions, a popular identity for the area did not emerge until the area had its initial population boom in the 20th century. It is one of several "coast" regions in Florida, such as the Gold Coast and the First Coast. The term was coined by John J. Schumann Jr. and Harry J. Schultz of the Vero Beach Press Journal newspaper shortly after salvagers began recovering Spanish treasure off the coast in 1961. The discovery of treasure from the 1715 Treasure Fleet, lost in a hurricane near the Sebastian Inlet, was of major local importance and brought international attention to the area. Press Journal publisher Shumann and editor Schultz noted that there was no name for their area, which was between the well-known Gold Coast to the south (from Palm Beach County to Miami) and the Space Coast to the north (Brevard County). They started referring to their region as the "Treasure Coast" in the newspaper, and this use spread to the community.

== Media ==
- In Vero Beach, classic hits-formatted WQOL-FM broadcasts on 103.7 FM.
- In Stuart, country music-themed WAVW-FM broadcasts on 92.7 FM.
- In Vero Beach, country music-themed WPHR-FM broadcasts at 94.7 FM. WTTB-FM carries the news talk format, and it broadcasts at 1490 AM and 105.7 FM.
- In Fort Pierce, National Public Radio network affiliate WQCS-FM broadcasts at 88.9 FM. It is owned by Indian River State College and carries news, talk, and informational programming. Its positioning statement is "NPR for the Treasure Coast". It is co-owned with WFLM-FM 91.1 FM in Fort Pierce, which airs an Urban Adult Contemporary format.

== Metropolitan areas ==
The Treasure Coast includes two metropolitan statistical areas designated by the Office of Management and Budget and used for statistical purposes by the Census Bureau and other agencies. These are:

- The Port St. Lucie, Florida MSA consists of Martin and St. Lucie counties. Port St. Lucie is designated as the principal city. The two-county MSA was first defined in 1983 as the Fort Pierce MSA. In 1993, the MSA was renamed the Fort Pierce-Port St. Lucie MSA. In 2006, Fort Pierce was dropped as a principal city and the name was changed to its present form.
- The Sebastian–Vero Beach, Florida MSA is coextensive with Indian River County. Sebastian and Vero Beach are designated as the principal cities.

== Geography ==
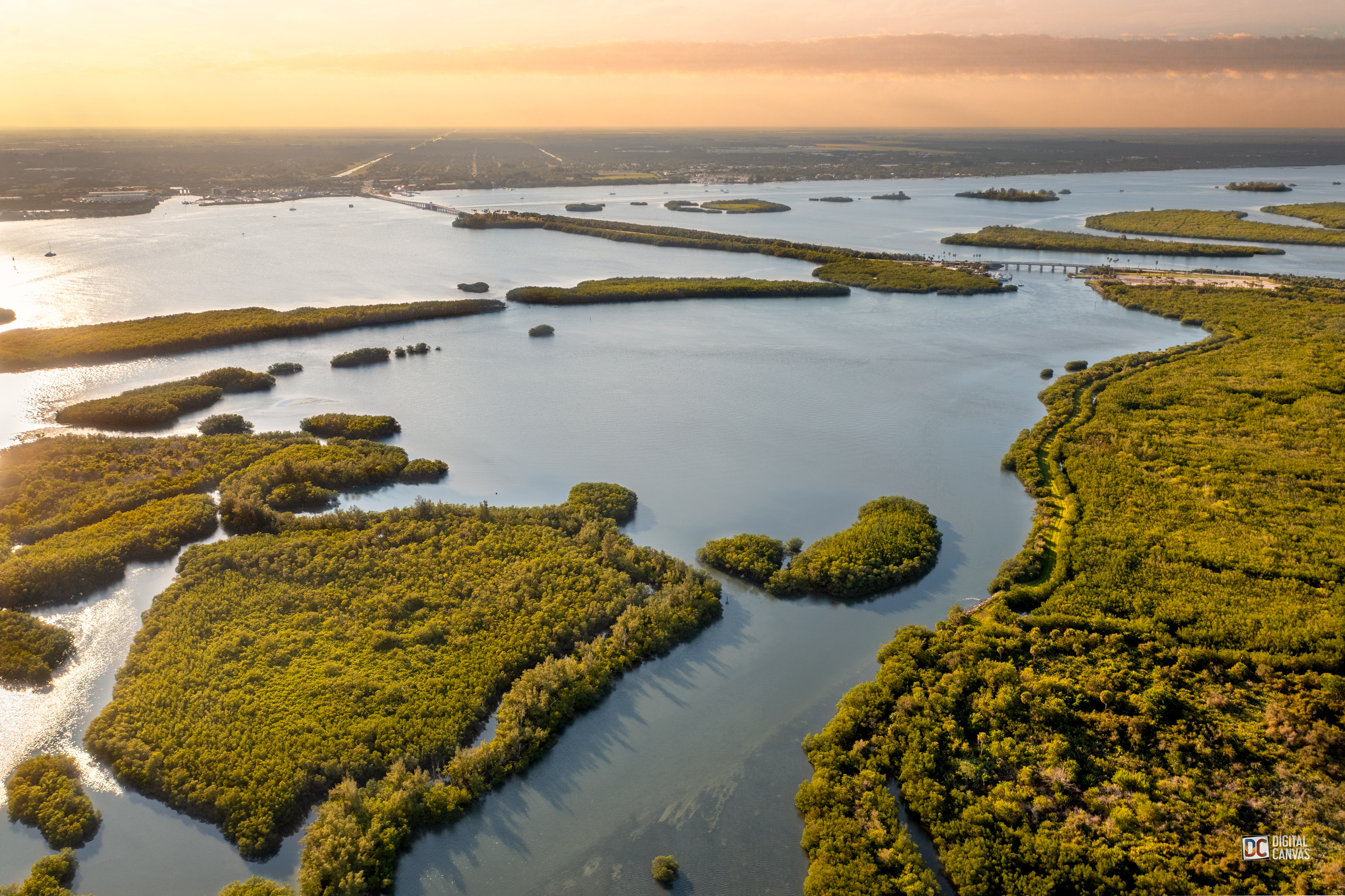
Indian River lagoons

All of the Treasure Coast is shielded from the Atlantic Ocean by narrow sandbars and barrier islands that protect the shallow lagoons, rivers, and bays. Immediately inland, pine and palmetto flatlands are abundant. Numerous lakes and rivers run through the Treasure Coast, notably the Indian River, a part of the Indian River Lagoon system. At certain seasons of the year, bridges may impede the red drift-algal flow, causing a "rotten egg" hydrogen sulfide odor in the area. The Treasure Coast is also bordered by the Atlantic portion of the Intracoastal Waterway, an inland waterway that stretches from Brownsville, Texas, to Boston, Massachusetts.

== Communities ==
Much of the Treasure Coast's population is made up of census-designated places (CDPs), with almost all of these in Martin and Indian River counties. Only one city on the Treasure Coast has a population greater than 100,000 inhabitants, which is Port St. Lucie in St. Lucie County. Here is the classification of the places of the Treasure Coast. (C for city, T for town, and V for village.)

=== Place with more than 100,000 inhabitants ===
- Port St. Lucie (principal city) pop. 217,523 (C)

=== Places with 10,000 to 50,000 inhabitants ===
- Fort Pierce pop. 43,601 (C)
- Sebastian pop. 23,344 (C)
- Stuart pop. 16,197 (C)
- Vero Beach pop. 16,017 (C)

=== Places with 5,000 to 10,000 inhabitants ===
- Fellsmere pop. 5,439 (C)
- Indiantown pop. 6,083 (V)

=== Places with 1,000 to 5,000 inhabitants ===
- Indian River Shores pop. 4,075 (T)
- Sewall's Point pop. 2,100 (T)

=== Places with fewer than 1,000 inhabitants ===
- St. Lucie Village pop. 604 (T)

=== Census-designated places (by population, as of 2010 Census) ===
- Palm City pop. 23,120
- Vero Beach South pop. 23,092
- Jensen Beach pop. 11,707
- Hobe Sound pop. 11,521
- Lakewood Park pop. 10,458
- Port Salerno pop. 10,091
- Gifford pop. 9,590
- Florida Ridge pop. 18,164
- Fort Pierce North pop. 6,474
- Indian River Estates pop. 6,220
- River Park pop. 5,222
- Fort Pierce South pop. 5,062
- White City pop. 3,719
- North River Shores pop. 3,101
- Roseland pop. 1,472

== Transportation infrastructure ==
=== Airports ===
Vero Beach Regional Airport offers commercial passenger service on Breeze Airways. Other commercial airports nearby include Melbourne's Melbourne Orlando International Airport to the north (40 miles [64 km] from Vero Beach), and West Palm Beach's President Donald J. Trump International Airport to the south (30 miles [48 km] from Hobe Sound). Other small regional airports in the area include Treasure Coast International Airport in Fort Pierce, and Witham Field in Stuart.

=== Marine transportation ===
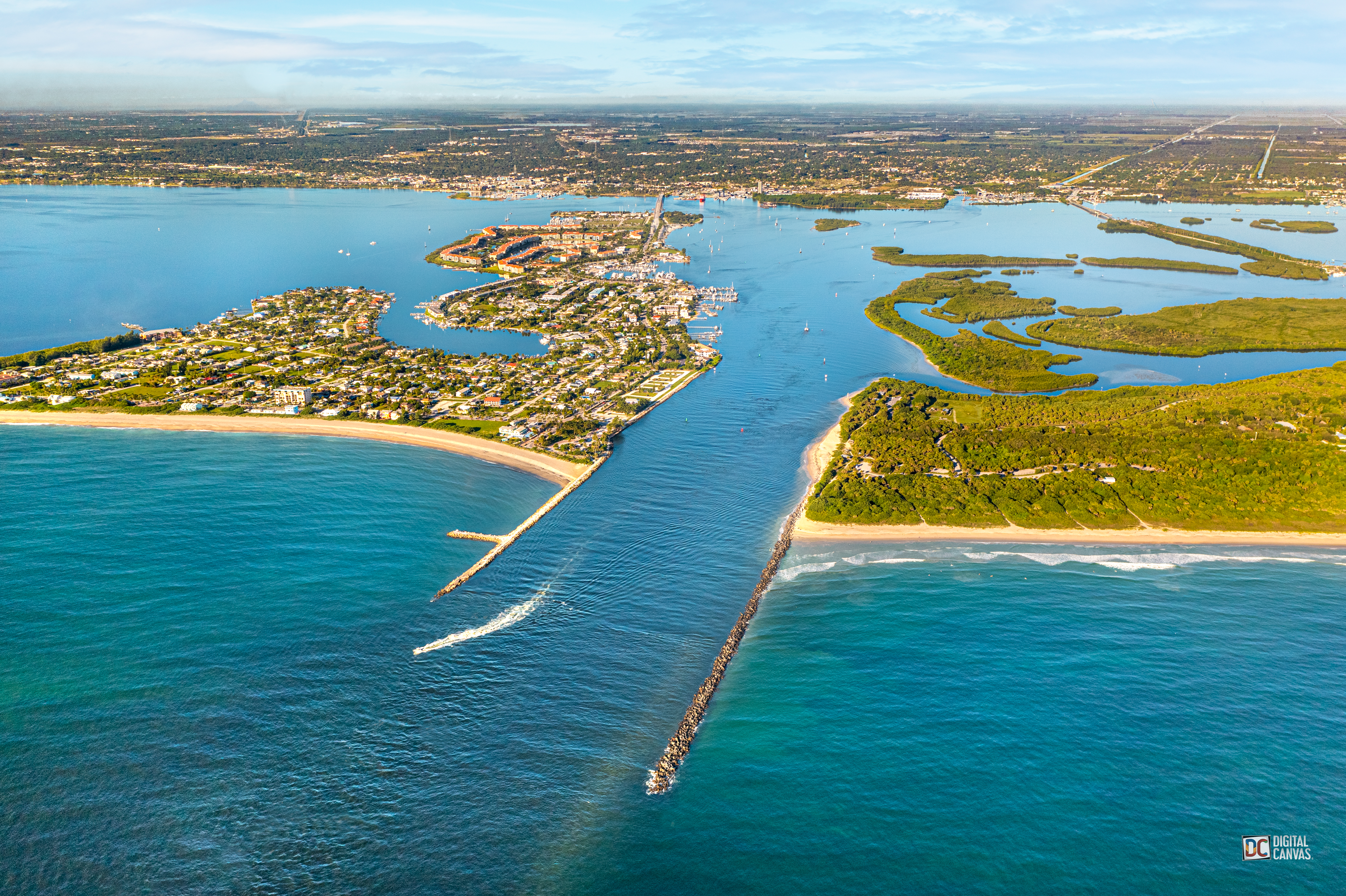
Fort Pierce Inlet State Park

The Port of Fort Pierce, in Ft. Pierce, located along the Indian River across from the Fort Pierce Inlet, is one of Florida’s 14 deepwater ports and a locally significant port for imports and exports. The Intracoastal Waterway follows the Indian River as it passes through the Treasure Coast. The Okeechobee Waterway connects Stuart with Ft. Myers on the west coast, passing through Lake Okeechobee about halfway along the route.

=== Highways ===
The Treasure Coast has two major north–south highways running through the area: Florida's Turnpike (a toll road) and Interstate 95. In the southern half of the Treasure Coast, both routes run generally parallel to each other (twice crossing each other), but are mostly located along the extreme western edges of the cities lining the coast. North of Ft. Pierce, the turnpike leaves the Treasure Coast, heading northwest towards Orlando, leaving 95 as the only north-south highway in the northern half of the area.

Much closer to the coast, U.S. Highway 1 (US 1) is the main north–south roadway passing through the cities. Along the western banks of the Indian River, and often on the barrier island for the region (Hutchinson Island and Orchid Island), is SR A1A.

Beginning in Stuart, State Road 76 (SR 76) runs west out of Stuart, passing Indiantown around halfway through before ending at an intersection with US 98/US 441 in Port Mayaca. Shortly after leaving Stuart, the road parallels the St. Lucie Canal along its southern edge until both terminate along the eastern shore of Lake Okeechobee.

SR 70 runs east-west, beginning in Ft. Pierce, passing through Okeechobee before terminating in Bradenton, 148 miles (238 km) from Ft. Pierce.

SR 60 connects Vero Beach in the east with Clearwater to the west, 161 miles (259 km) away.

=== Railroads ===
The Florida East Coast Railway (FEC) operates freight service along the coast throughout the region. It also operates a rail yard just south of downtown Fort Pierce.

U.S. Sugar's South Central Florida Express, Inc. (SCXF) leases tracks between Pahokee and Fort Pierce from the FEC, known as the Lake Harbor Branch (K Branch). Along with trackage rights into FEC's Fort Pierce Yard, they also have a car haulage arrangement with FEC to Jacksonville to interchange with CSX and Norfolk Southern.

Up until 1963, long-distance passenger trains operated along the route. Among the most notable passenger trains were (main sponsors and destinations) the East Coast Champion (Atlantic Coast Line, New York City); City of Miami (Illinois Central, Chicago); Dixie Flyer (Louisville & Nashville, Chicago); Florida Special (winter season only; Florida East Coast Railway, New York City); Havana Special (Florida East Coast Railway, New York City); South Wind (Louisville & Nashville, Chicago). The Southern Railway's Royal Palm from Cincinnati ended its service south of Jacksonville, along the Florida East Coast by 1958.

Amtrak and the Florida Department of Transportation had been discussing returning passenger service to the coast. In 2023, Brightline, an inter-city rail route that currently runs between Miami and Orlando, announced that it was looking for sites for a new station on the Treasure Coast. On March 4, 2024, Brightline officially announced that an infill station on the Treasure Coast would be built in Stuart, with service now projected to begin by 2028.

== See also ==
- Gold Coast - to the south
- Space Coast - to the north
- Florida Heartland - to the west
