= Florida State Road 713 =

Highway in Florida

State Road 713

Route information
- Maintained by FDOT
- Length: 10.198 mi (16.412 km)

Major junctions
- South end: SR 70 / Florida's Turnpike in Fort Pierce
- North end: US 1 near Lakewood Park

Location
- Country: United States
- State: Florida
- Counties: St. Lucie

Highway system
- Florida State Highway System; Interstate; US; State; Former; Pre‑1945; Toll; Scenic
← SR 710	→ SR 714

State Road 713 (SR 713) is a state highway in the U.S. state of Florida locally known as Kings Highway and Turnpike Feeder Road. The 10.2-mile (16.4 km)-long, two-lane north–south road is a popular truck route connecting SR 70 in Fort Pierce to the south and U.S. Route 1 (SR 5) between Viking and Florida Ridge to the north. While urbanization is encroaching upon SR 713 north of SR 68, most of SR 713 passes through woodland interspersed with orange groves.

== Route description ==
SR 713 begins as Kings Highway at the intersection between SR 70 and an interchange with Florida's Turnpike (exit 152) and heads north. North of the SR 614 intersection, it veers to the northeast and changes names to Turnpike Feeder Road. The road terminates at US 1 just south of the St. Lucie-Indian River county line.

== History ==
According to a 1960 map prepared by the State Road Department (forerunner to Florida Department of Transportation), Kings Highway had a State Road 607 designation—at the same time as Emerson Road (current SR 607) and Indrio Road (part west of Kings Highway is now SR 614), with Angle Road being SR 607A at the time.

Prior to the completion of Interstate 95 in Florida in 1987, it was commonly used to "bridge the gap" between Florida's Turnpike (SR 91) and the Interstate highway.

As sections of I-95 were completed between SR 60 near Vero Beach and SR 70 in Fort Pierce between 1978 and 1980, the common methodology of using SR 713 to travel between I-95 and the Turnpike evolved:

- Until early 1978, northbound motorists turned west onto Indrio Road (SR 614) and north onto Emerson Road (SR 607). After 8.5 miles (13.7 km) of Emerson Road, northbound motorists turned west onto SR 60, which connected with I-95 six miles (10 km) from SR 607.
- When a nine-mile (14 km)-long section of I-95 opened in 1978, northbound motorists stayed on Indrio Road (SR 614) after turning left from SR 713. The then-new I-95 interchange was three miles (4.8 km) to the west of SR 713 on Indrio Road.
- When an additional six miles (9.7 km) of I-95 were opened in late 1978, motorists were directed eastward on SR 68 from SR 713 to connect with I-95. Most stayed with this route after a 0.3-mile (0.48 km)-long section (to SR 70) was opened in early 1979, even though Florida Department of Transportation posted signs encouraging them to avoid SR 713 altogether and use SR 70. The final segment of I-95 to be finished in Florida (Stuart to Palm Beach Gardens) was finally opened in 1987.

== Major intersections ==
The entire route is in St. Lucie County.

Location	mi	km	Destinations	Notes
Fort Pierce	0.000	0.000	SR 70 (Okeechobee Road) / Florida's Turnpike to I-95	Exit 152 on Florida's Turnpike (tolled road)
	2.399	3.861	SR 68 east / CR 68 west (Orange Avenue) to I-95	Termini of SR 68 and CR 68
	3.896	6.270	CR 607A (Angle Road)	Former SR 707A
	4.926	7.928	CR 608 east (St. Lucie Boulevard) – Airport	Former western terminus of SR 608
Lakewood Park	7.457	12.001	SR 614 west / CR 614 east (Indrio Road) to I-95	Termini of SR 614 and CR 614
	10.198	16.412	US 1	Road is unsigned SR 5
1.000 mi = 1.609 km; 1.000 km = 0.621 mi: Tolled
