= County Road 707 (Treasure Coast) =

Two segments of road in Florida, US

County Road 707
- Segments of CR 707 in red, CR 723 in blue, CR 707A/CR 732 in purple

Route information
- Maintained by Palm Beach, Martin, and St. Lucie counties
- Length: 28.8 mi (46.3 km)

Southern segment
- Length: 8.9 mi (14.3 km)
- South end: US 1 / SR 811 in Tequesta
- North end: CR 708 in Jupiter Island

Northern segment
- Length: 19.9 mi (32.0 km)
- South end: CR 723 in Stuart
- North end: SR A1A in Fort Pierce

Location
- Country: United States
- State: Florida

Highway system
- County roads in Florida

County Road 707 (CR 707) is a designation applied to two segments of road across three counties on Florida's Treasure Coast. The entire road was formerly designated State Road 707 (SR 707) and has been gradually transferred to county jurisdiction.

In St. Lucie County, CR 707 is part of the Indian River Lagoon – Treasure Coast Scenic Highway, a Florida Scenic Highway.

== Route description ==
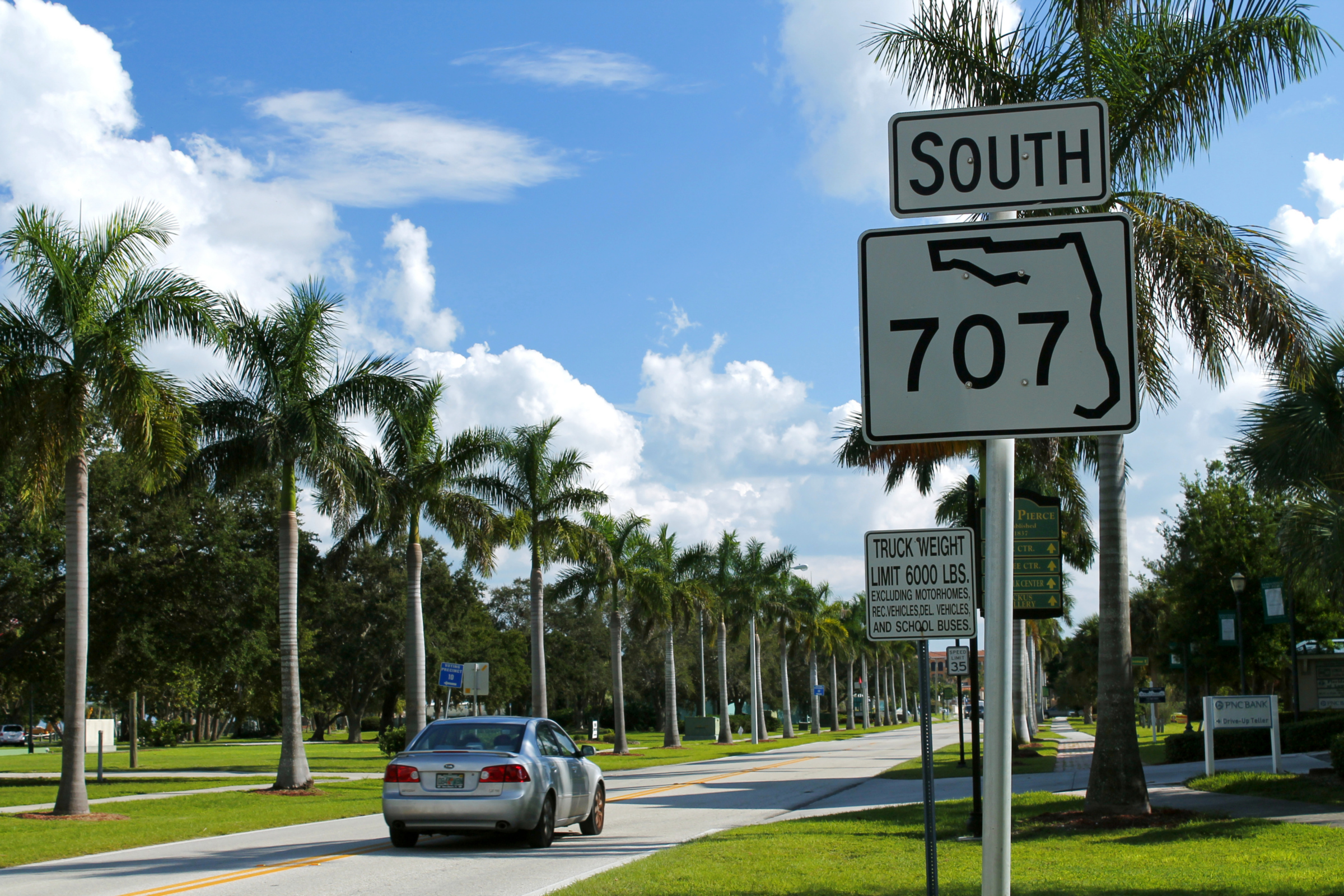
A sign for (former) Florida State Road 707 in Fort Pierce, before the road was decommissioned and turned over for county maintenance.

CR 707 exists in two sections. One extends along Beach Road, a former segment of SR A1A, from US 1 and SR 811 in Jupiter to CR 708 in Jupiter Island. The northern segment follows an old alignment of Dixie Highway from CR 723 in Stuart to SR A1A in downtown Fort Pierce. This segment is also known as Dixie Highway and Indian River Drive and runs parallel to the Florida East Coast Railroad tracks from Fort Pierce to Jensen Beach. Communities served by this segment include Eden, Walton, Ankona, and Eldred.

== History ==
In addition to the two segments of CR 707, SR 707 also included 2 miles (3.2 km) of Old Dixie Highway from the south end of the Old Roosevelt Bridge in Stuart to the intersection of Savannah Road (CR 723) near Rio, was transferred to the city of Stuart in 2012 or 2013. This segment is not part of CR 707 and is maintained locally.

Unlike the St. Lucie County segment of the former SR 707, the Martin County segment did not parallel the FEC rails as the former alignment of Dixie Highway. This was done by a former alignment of SR A1A, now designated County Road A1A, from Stuart to Jupiter. Former alignments of Dixie Highway in southern Florida include SR 811 and County Road 811 in Palm Beach County, SR 811 and the former SR 5A in Broward County, and SR 909 and the former SR 815 in Miami-Dade County.

The southern segment of CR 707 was formerly designated "SR A1A Alternate" before it was SR 707. This alternate designation still continues south from CR 707's southern terminus along SR 811.

== Related routes ==
=== Jensen Beach Boulevard ===
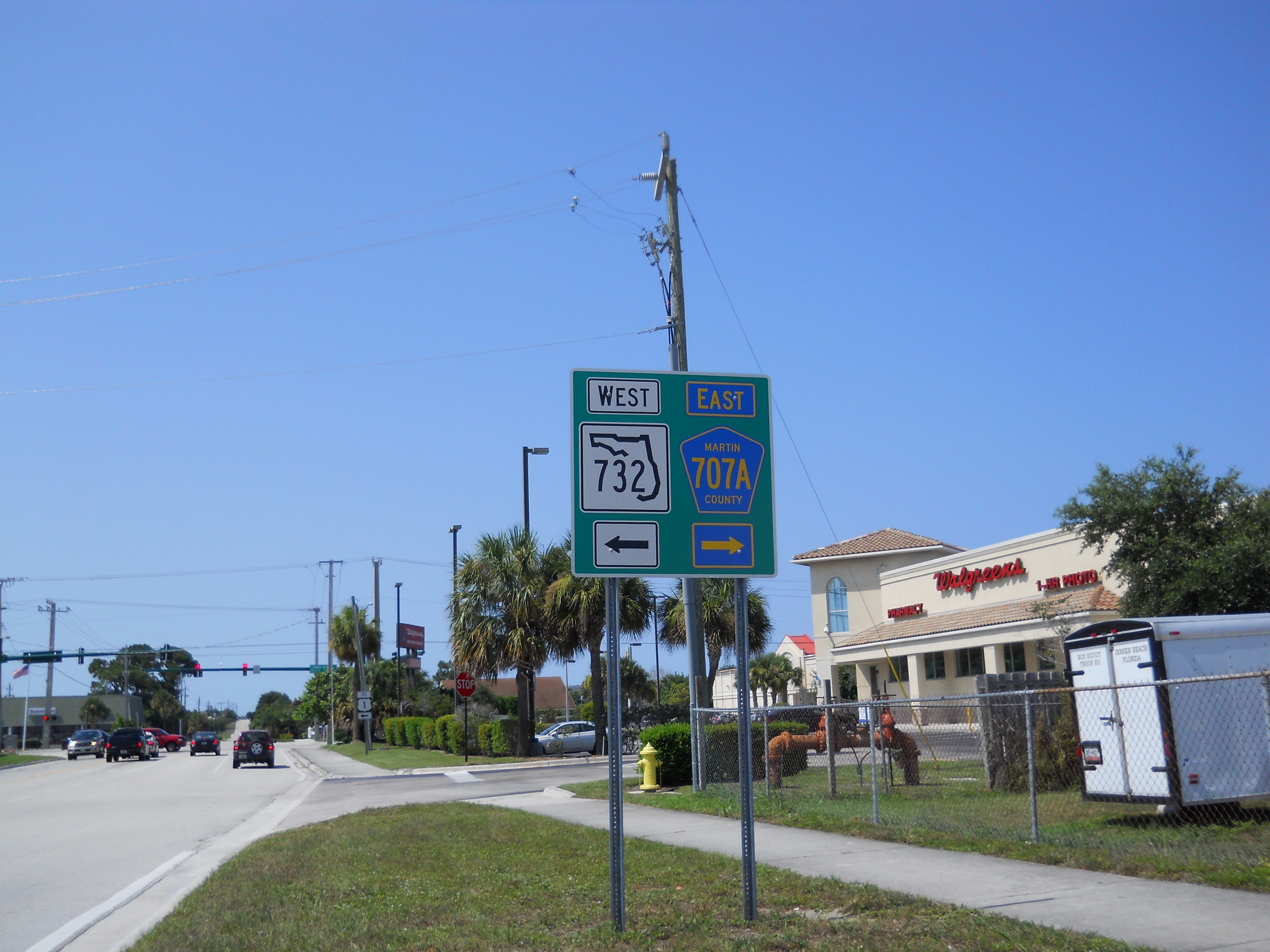
A July 2010 photograph of Savannah Road south of Jensen Beach Boulevard, indicating the transition from SR 732 to CR 707A at this intersection.

Jensen Beach Boulevard, a 2.9-mile (4.7 km) east–west street, was formerly signed State Road 707A as a spur route connecting Federal Highway (US 1) in Jensen Beach to Indian River Drive (CR 707) in Ocean Breeze.

In the 1990s, the Florida Department of Transportation removed the State Road from several routes in the Stuart area, including SR 707A. Jensen Beach Boulevard was then redesignated County Road 732, not to be confused with SR 732, which is the nearby Jensen Beach Causeway. However, conflicting signage on Jensen Beach Boulevard indicates it is part of SR 732, CR 732, as well as County Road 707A. At its westernmost intersection with US 1 it is signed CR 732. At an intersection with Royal Park Drive, the road is signed as SR 732 on a green street sign. At Savannah Road (CR 723), a green sign depicts this intersection as the eastern terminus of SR 732 and the western terminus of CR 707A. (see image at left)

A FDOT-published county map from February 2002 listed the road as solely CR 732. However, the map's 2015 update shows the road as solely CR 707A.

=== County Road 723 (formerly State Road 723) ===
The former State Road 723 was also a signed north-south spur of SR 707. A 1.8-mile-long north–south street locally known as Savannah Road, the former State Road (and current County Road 723) extends from an intersection with Dixie Highway (SR 707) and Cardinal Avenue in Rio to an intersection with Jensen Beach Boulevard (former SR 707A/current CR 732) in Jensen Beach. Savannah Road is primarily a commercial highway even though it is lined with residential developments. Shopping centers are clustered near its interchange with Jensen Beach Boulevard while business and industrial parks straddle the county road near its southern terminus. State road shields were removed in the 1990s.

== Major intersections ==
County	Location	mi	km	Destinations	Notes
Palm Beach	Jupiter–Tequesta line	0.0	0.0	US 1 / SR 811 south (Beach Road)	Northern terminus of SR 811; US 1 is unsigned SR 5 and SR A1A
Palm Beach	Jupiter Sound	0.4	0.64	Jupiter Island Bridge	
Martin	Jupiter Island	8.9	14.3	CR 708 west (Southeast Bridge Road) / North Beach Road	Eastern terminus of CR 708; continues north to a dead end
Martin	Gap in route				
Martin	Stuart	0.0	0.0	CR 723 north (Savannah Road) / Dixie Highway south	Southern terminus of CR 723
Martin	Jensen Beach	2.4	3.9	Sewalls Point Road south	To SR A1A
Martin	Jensen Beach	4.1	6.6	Jensen Beach Boulevard (CR 707A west) – Historical Downtown	Former SR 707A
Martin	Jensen Beach	4.5	7.2	SR 732 east – Hutchinson Island	Traffic circle
St. Lucie	Indian River Estates	14.5	23.3	CR 712 west (Midway Road)	Former eastern terminus of SR 712
St. Lucie	Fort Pierce	19.2	30.9	Citrus Avenue to US 1	Traffic circle
St. Lucie	Fort Pierce	19.4	31.2	Orange Avenue	Former eastern terminus of SR 68
St. Lucie	Fort Pierce	19.9	32.0	SR A1A (Seaway Drive) / Indian River Drive north	Seaway Dr provides access to the Hutchinson Island Beaches via the South Causeway
St. Lucie	Fort Pierce	20.02	32.22	Fishermans Wharf	Northern Terminus of Indian River Drive
1.000 mi = 1.609 km; 1.000 km = 0.621 mi
