= Florida State Road 70 =

State highway in Florida, United States

State Road 70
- SR 70 highlighted in red

Route information
- Maintained by FDOT
- Length: 148.034 mi (238.238 km)
- Existed: 1945 renumbering (definition)–present

Major junctions
- West end: US 41 near Bradenton
- I-75 near Bradenton; US 17 in Arcadia; US 27 near Lake Placid; US 98 / US 441 in Okeechobee; Florida's Turnpike in Fort Pierce; I-95 in Fort Pierce
- East end: US 1 in Fort Pierce

Location
- Country: United States
- State: Florida
- Counties: Manatee, DeSoto, Highlands, Okeechobee, St. Lucie

Highway system
- Florida State Highway System; Interstate; US; State; Former; Pre‑1945; Toll; Scenic
← SR 69	→ SR 71

Stretching 148 miles (238 km) across the Florida peninsula, State Road 70 (SR 70) spans five Florida counties and straddles the northern boundaries of two more. Its western terminus is at US 41 (14th Street West) south of Bradenton (Manatee County); its eastern terminus is an intersection of Virginia Avenue and South Fourth Street (U.S. Route 1/SR 5) in Fort Pierce (St. Lucie County).

== Route description ==
=== Manatee County ===
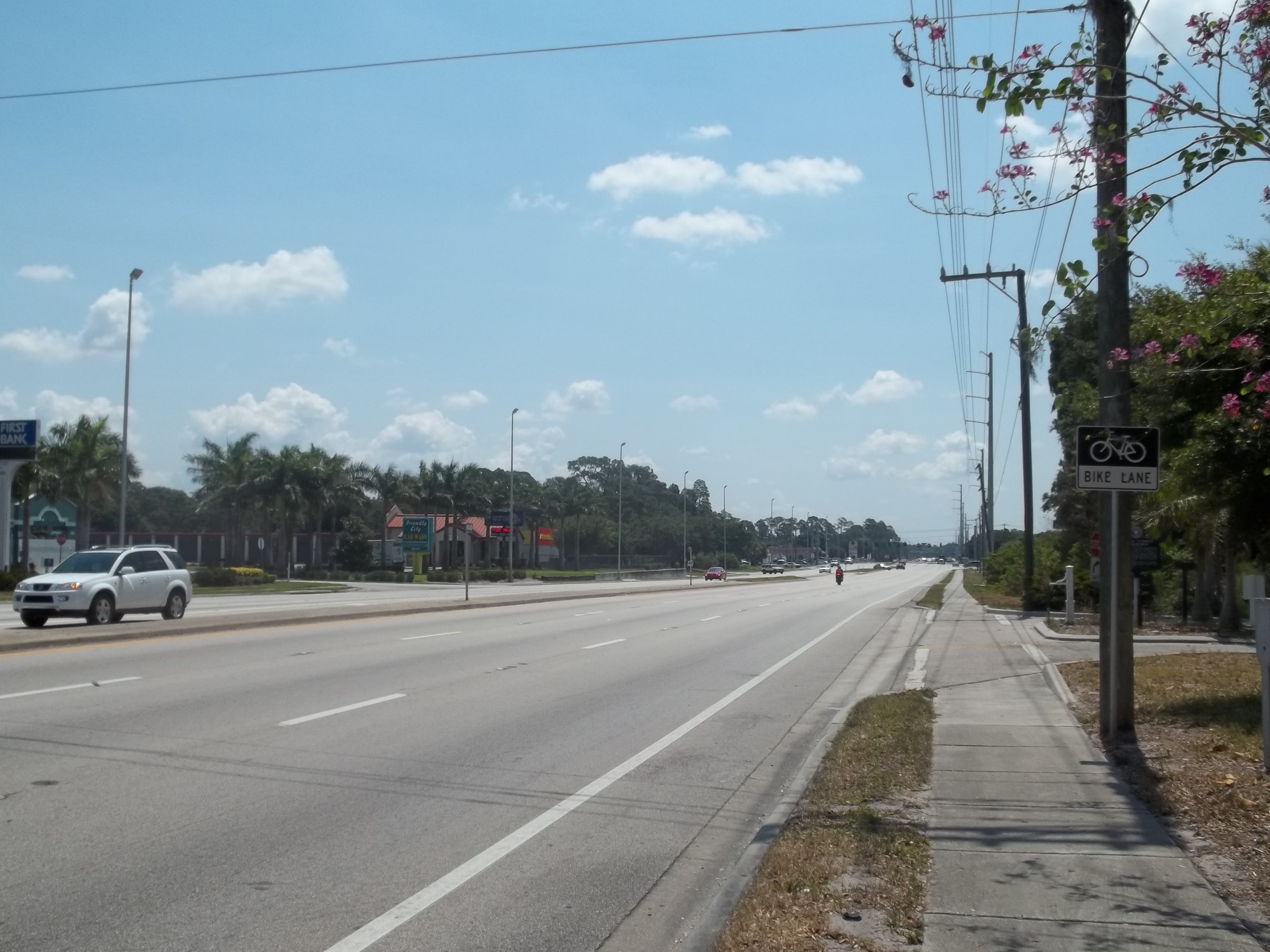
SR 70 in Oneco

SR 70 begins in Manatee County just south of Bradenton city limits at an intersection with US 41 (Tamiami Trail). From its terminus, it heads east along 53rd Avenue West as a four-lane undivided road. It expands to a six-lane divided road at 15th Street (301 Boulevard). As it continues through the community of Oneco, it crosses the Seminole Gulf Railway's Sarasota Division and Bowles Creek before coming to an intersection with US 301.

Beyond US 301, SR 70 continues east as it leaves the Bradenton area, crossing the Braden River and coming to an interchange with Interstate 75. SR 70 remains a six lane road beyond Interstate 75 as it runs along the north side of Lakewood Ranch. At Lorraine Road, SR 70 becomes a two-lane undivided road and turns southeast. It passes through Verna, Parmalee, Myakka City, and Edgeville before leaving Manatee County and entering Desoto County.

=== Desoto and Highlands counties ===
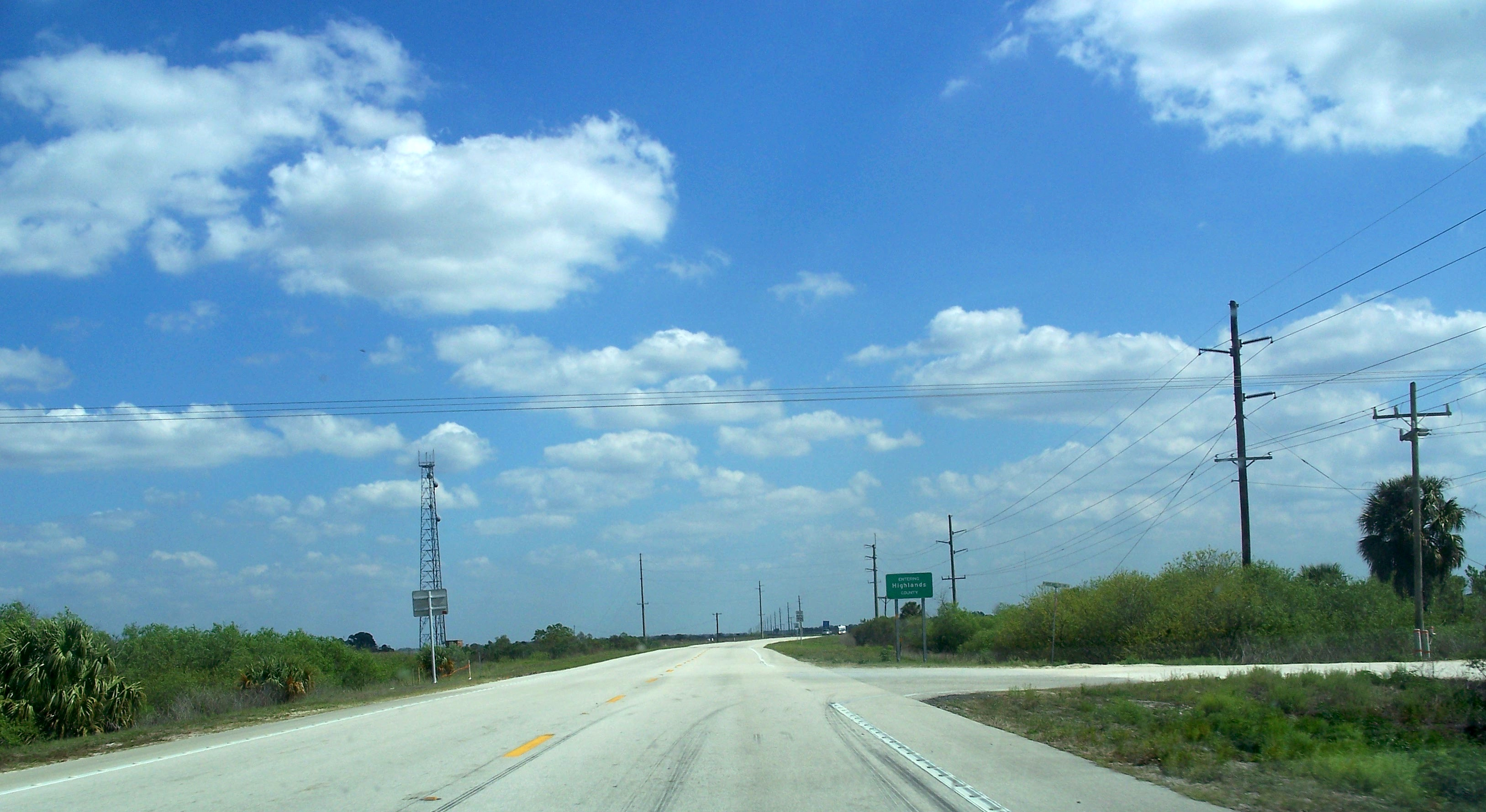
SR 70 near the Desoto/Highlands County line

In Desoto County, SR 70 passes through Pine Level as it gets closer to Arcadia. SR 70 enters Arcadia along West Oak Street, and it crosses the Peace River and the Seminole Gulf Railway's Fort Myers Division. Near Lake Katherine, SR 70 splits into two one-way streets with eastbound lanes running along Magnolia Street and westbound lanes running along Hickory Street through Arcadia's historic downtown. It intersects with US 17 in Downtown Arcadia, which also runs along two one-way streets. Less than a mile east of US 17, the eastbound and westbound lanes of SR 70 reunite and the route continues east along East Oak Street. Right after leaving Arcadia city limits, SR 70 intersects with SR 31 and is reduced back to two lanes as it heads due east. It enters Highlands County 16 miles later.

In Highlands County, SR 70 continues due east for another 12 miles. It then enters the community of Childs just south of Lake Placid. It crosses the South Central Florida Express railroad before coming to an intersection with US 27 in Bairs Den. Beyond US 27, SR 70 passes Bear Hollow and continues its due east trajectory. After another 10 miles, SR 70 turns northeast and passes through Brighton and turns back east. After another 7 miles, SR 70 crosses the Kissimmee River and enters Okeechobee County.

=== Okeechobee and St. Lucie counties ===
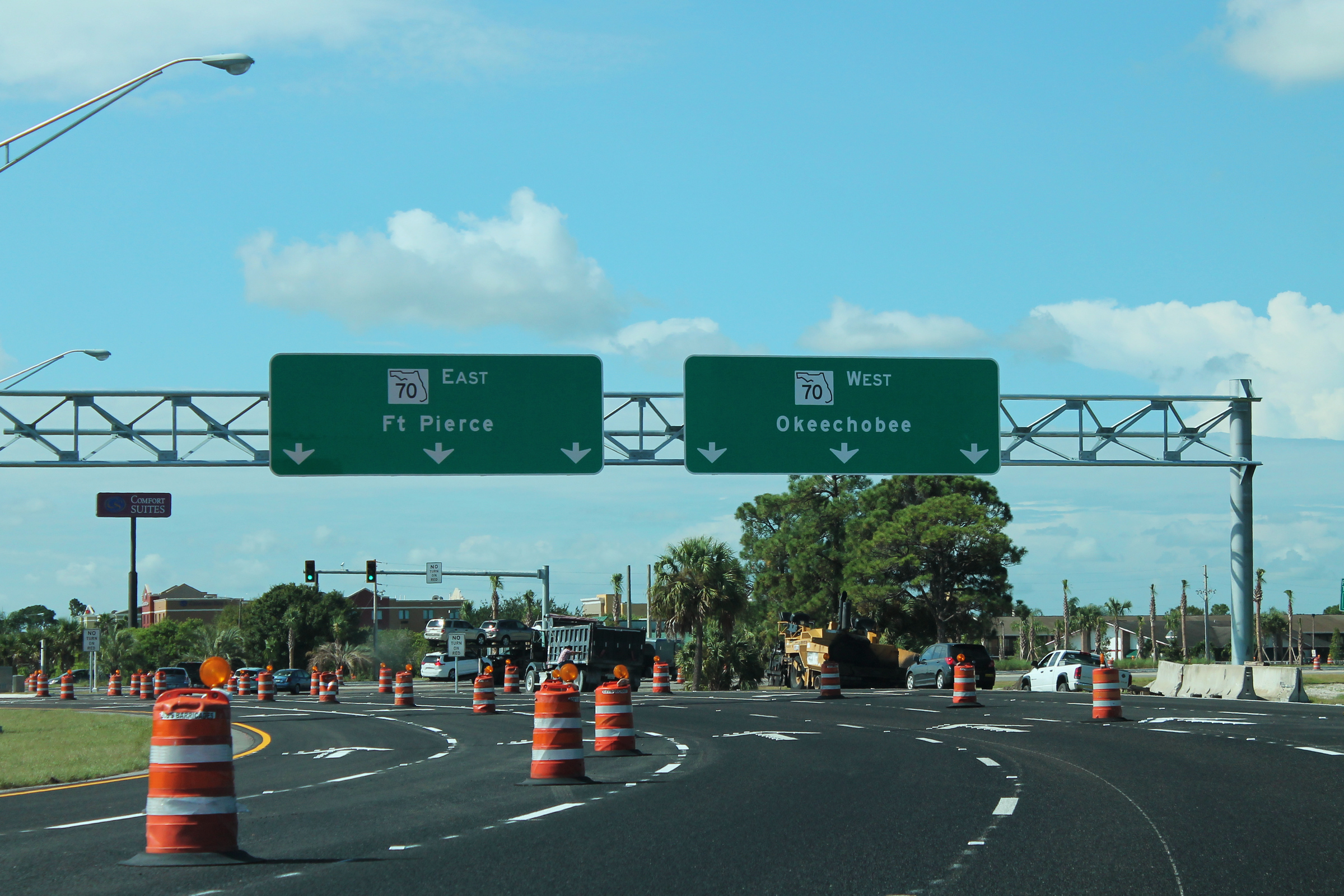
Interstate 95 exit onto SR 70 in St. Lucie County.

In Okeechobee County, SR 70 continues east another 8 miles and comes to an intersection with US 98 (part of the historic Conners Highway) just outside of Okeechobee. SR 70 and US 98 then run east concurrently along Park Street into Okeechobee city limits. US 98 splits off and continues south less than a mile later while SR 70 continues east with four lanes out of the city. It crosses CSX's Auburndale Subdivision and passes the Okeechobee fairgrounds just outside of the city. SR 70 then runs northeast as a four-lane highway for another 9 miles before crossing into St. Lucie County.

SR 70 is known as Okeechobee Road in St. Lucie County and it continues winding through the rural areas in the western part of the county. As it gets closer to the east coast, it passes the St. Lucie County fairgrounds near Port St. Lucie. On the outskirts of Fort Pierce, SR 70 has interchanges with Florida's Turnpike and Interstate 95 which are less than a mile apart. As it enters Fort Pierce city limits, SR 70 turns east on Virginia Avenue and continues another 2.5 miles to its eastern terminus at US 1.

=== Spur in Bradenton ===
SR 70 has a short spur in Oneco that connects the highway with Bradenton. This three-mile spur runs north from Oneco along 15th Street to SR 64 (Manatee Avenue) in Bradenton. This spur was signed as SR 70 until 2018, but it is still under state maintenance.

== History ==
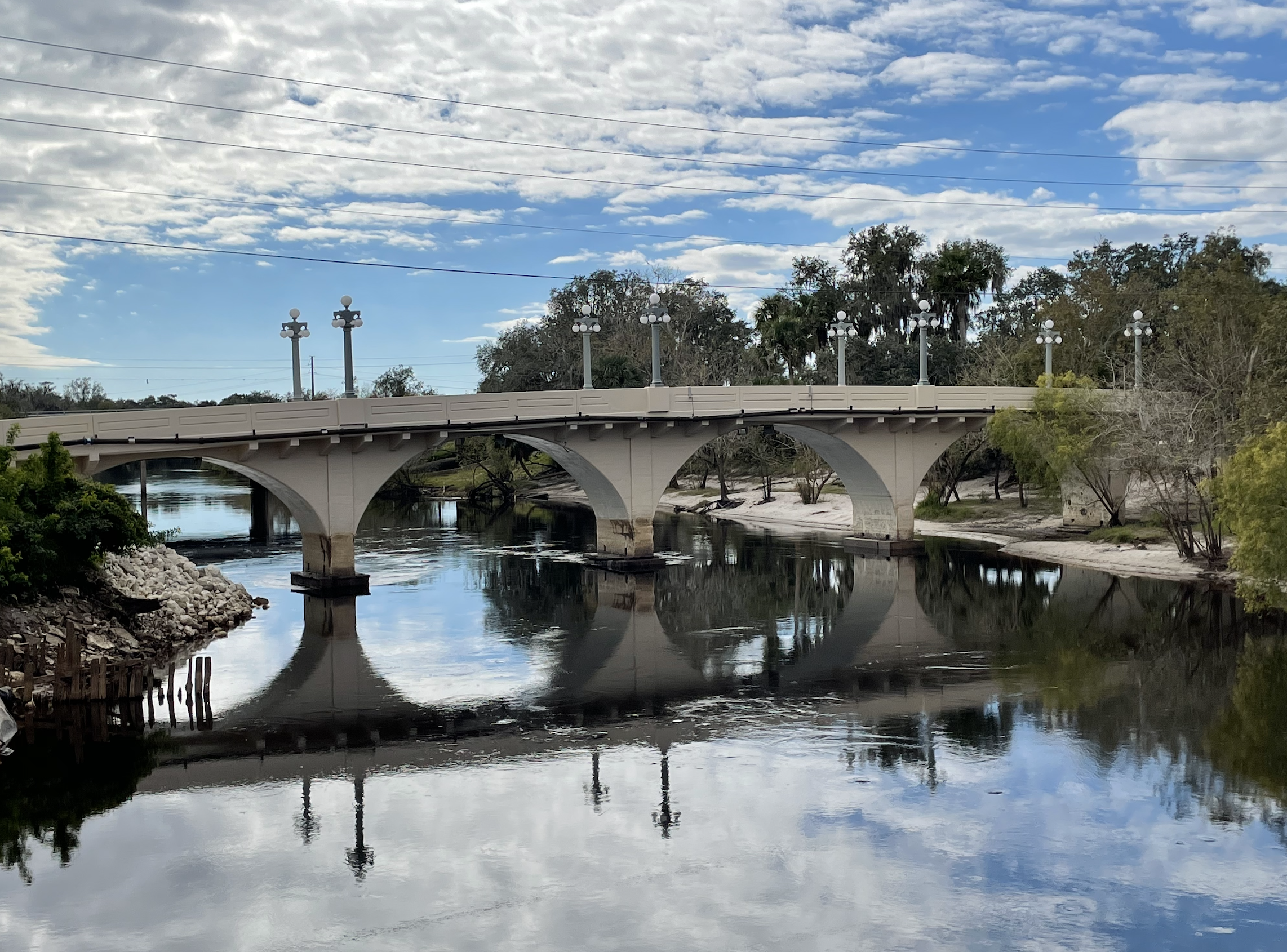
Former SR 70 Luten arch bridge over Peace River in Arcadia in 2020.

The present route of SR 70 was added to the state highway system in the 1920s with three separate designations. From Bradenton to Parkton (just southeast of Edgeville), it was part of SR 18A (which also continued west of Bradenton to Anna Maria Island via Cortez Road). From Parkton to Childs, it was designated SR 18 (which also continued west from Parkton to Old Miakka and Sarasota). From Childs to Fort Pierce, it was designated as SR 8. East of Lakewood Ranch, the route closely paralleled the route of the East and West Coast Railway, which existed from 1915 to 1934 between Bradenton and Arcadia.

The full cross-peninsular route from US 41 in Bradenton to US 1 in Fort Pierce was redesignated SR 70 in 1945 as a result of the 1945 Florida state road renumbering.

Prior to the 1960s, SR 70 entered Arcadia from the west on a historic Luten arch bridge over the Peace River. This historic arch bridge was built in 1925 by the Luten Bridge Company. From this bridge, SR 70 ran along Magnolia Street, then turned south at Lee Avenue for a block, then east on Oak Street though historic Downtown Arcadia and further east. In 1961, a new four-lane bridge carrying SR 70 over the Peace River in Arcadia opened. Around the same time, SR 70 was split into its current one-way street routing through Arcadia. The original arch bridge is still in use as a pedestrian bridge connecting DeSoto Veterans Memorial Park and Morgan Park and it was rehabilitated in 2020.

== Major intersections ==
County	Location	mi	km	Destinations	Notes
Manatee		0.000	0.000	US 41 (14th Street West / SR 45) – Airport	
Manatee	Oneco	1.761	2.834	15th Street East	Former US 301
Manatee		2.762	4.445	US 301 (SR 683)	
Manatee		7.19	11.57	I-75 (SR 93) – Tampa, Naples	I-75 exit 217
Manatee		17.328	27.887	CR 675 north – Zolfo Springs, Parrish	
Manatee	Myakka City	26.907	43.303	Singletary Road / Myakka-Wauchula Road	
DeSoto		44.838	72.160	CR 661A north	
DeSoto		45.901	73.870	CR 661 north – Ona	
DeSoto		46.163	74.292	SR 72 west – Sarasota	
DeSoto	Peace River			Bridge over the Peace River	
DeSoto	Arcadia	48.064	77.352	US 17 south (DeSoto Avenue / SR 35) – Punta Gorda	
DeSoto	Arcadia	48.143	77.479	US 17 north (Brevard Avenue / SR 35) – Zolfo Springs	
DeSoto		49.824	80.184	SR 31 south – Fort Myers	northern terminus of SR 31
DeSoto		54.867	88.300	CR 760 west	
Highlands	Childs	79.858	128.519	Old State Road 8 north	
Highlands	Childs	79.913	128.608	Old State Road 8 south	not actually former SR 8, but rather SR 67
Highlands	Bairs Den	80.931	130.246	US 27 (SR 25) – Lake Placid, Moore Haven	
Highlands	Bear Hollow	83.694	134.692	CR 29 north	
Highlands	Brighton	95.654	153.940	CR 721 south – Lakeport, Seminole Reservation	
Highlands		98.412	158.379	CR 721 north	
Kissimmee River		102.84	165.50	Harding Memorial Bridge	
Okeechobee		104.224	167.732	CR 599 north (Northwest 128th Avenue)	
Okeechobee		111.119	178.829	US 98 north (SR 700) – Sebring	west end of US 98 / SR 700 overlap
Okeechobee	Okeechobee	112.290	180.713	US 98 south / US 441 (Parrott Avenue / SR 15 / SR 700 south) – Orlando, Lake Okeechobee, West Palm Beach, Amtrak	east end of US 98 / SR 700 overlap
Okeechobee		114.098	183.623	SR 710 east to Florida's Turnpike – Indiantown	Western terminus of SR 710
St. Lucie		133.934	215.546	CR 613 south (Carlton Road)	
St. Lucie		134.330	216.183	CR 613 north (Sneed Road)	
St. Lucie		136.372	219.469	CR 609 north (Header Canal Road)	
St. Lucie		137.144	220.712	CR 712 east (Midway Road) – County Fairgrounds	
St. Lucie		137.989	222.072	CR 609A (Shinn Road)	
St. Lucie		140.198	225.627	McCarty Road	former SR 712A south
St. Lucie		140.702	226.438	Eleven Mile Road - Camp Hidden Hammock	former SR 712B south
St. Lucie	Fort Pierce	143.314	230.642	Florida's Turnpike (SR 91) / SR 713 north (Kings Highway) to US 1 – Airport, Miami, Orlando	Turnpike exit 152, southern terminus of SR 713
St. Lucie	Fort Pierce	144.021	231.779	I-95 (SR 9) – West Palm Beach, Daytona Beach	I-95 exit 129
St. Lucie	Fort Pierce	144.377	232.352	CR 611 (Jenkins Road)	
St. Lucie	Fort Pierce	145.432	234.050	CR 770 east (Okeechobee Road)	
St. Lucie	Fort Pierce	146.527	235.812	SR 615 (M.L. King Jr. Boulevard / South 25th Street)	
St. Lucie	Fort Pierce	147.662	237.639	CR 605 (Oleander Avenue)	
St. Lucie	Fort Pierce	148.034	238.238	US 1 (SR 5)	
1.000 mi = 1.609 km; 1.000 km = 0.621 mi: Concurrency terminus

Spur in Bradenton

County	Location	mi	km	Destinations	Notes
Manatee	Oneco	0.000	0.000	301 Boulevard	former US 301
Manatee		1.600	2.575	US 301 (SR 683)	
Manatee	Bradenton	3.030	4.876	SR 64 (Manatee Avenue East) to I-75 – Beaches, Anna Maria Island	
1.000 mi = 1.609 km; 1.000 km = 0.621 mi
