= List of county roads in Okeechobee County, Florida =

- County road shields used in Florida

Highway names
- Interstates: Interstate X (I-X)
- US Highways: U.S. Highway X (US X)
- State: State Road X (SR X)
- County: County Road X (CR X)

System links
- County roads in Florida; County roads in Okeechobee County

The following is a list of county roads in Okeechobee County, Florida. All county roads are maintained by the county in which they reside.

== County roads in Okeechobee County ==
Route	Road Name(s)	From	To	Notes
CR 15A	Southeast 86th Boulevard	US 98-441 (SR 15)	SR 710	former SR 15A
CR 15B	Southeast 126th Boulevard	US 98-441 (SR 15)	SR 710	former SR 15B
CR 15C	Northeast 304th Street	US 441 (SR 15)	Fort Drum @ Okeechobee-St. Lucie County Line	former SR 15C
CR 68	Micco Bluff Road			former SR 68
CR 68	Northwest 160th Street; Florida Cracker Trail			former SR 68
CR 68A	Potter Road	CR 68	US 441	former SR 68A
CR 70A	Old Dixie Highway			former SR 70A
CR 599	128th Avenue	Dyke/Levee S-65-E	Northwest 58th Street	former SR 599
CR 700A		US 98 (SR 700)	CR 724	former SR 700A
CR 700B		Dead end at Basinger Cemetery	US 98 (SR 700)	former SR 700B
CR 718	Northwest 36th Street	US 98	US 441	former SR 718; North of Okeechobee County Airport
CR 724	Eagle Island Road	CR 700A	US 441	former SR 724
