= North River Shores, Florida =

- Census-designated place
- Location in Martin County and the state of Florida
- Coordinates: 27°13′20″N 80°16′26″W
- Country: United States
- State: Florida
- County: Martin

Area
  - Total: 1.94 sq mi (5.03 km^{2})
  - Land: 1.27 sq mi (3.28 km^{2})
  - Water: 0.68 sq mi (1.75 km^{2})
- Elevation: 7 ft (2.1 m)

Population (2020)
  - Total: 3,459
  - Density: 2,732.3/sq mi (1,054.93/km^{2})
- Time zone: UTC-5 (Eastern (EST))
  - Summer (DST): UTC-4 (EDT)
- FIPS code: 12-49750
- GNIS feature ID: 2403353
- Website: www.northrivershoresfl.org

North River Shores is an unincorporated area and census-designated place (CDP) in Martin County, Florida, United States. The population was 3,459 at the 2020 census, up from 3,079 in 2010. It is part of the Port St. Lucie Metropolitan Statistical Area.

== Geography ==
North River Shores is located in northeastern Martin County. It is bordered to the east by the city of Stuart, the Martin county seat, to the south by the tidal North Fork of the St. Lucie River, and to the west by St. Lucie County. U.S. Route 1 runs along the eastern edge of the community, leading south 2 miles (3 km) to the center of Stuart and north 4 miles (6 km) into the eastern part of Port St. Lucie.

According to the United States Census Bureau, the CDP has a total area of 1.94 square miles (5.0 km^{2}), of which 1.27 square miles (3.3 km^{2}) is land and 0.67 square miles (1.7 km^{2}), or 34.78%, are water.

== Demographics ==
Historical population
| Census | Pop. | Note | %± |
|---|---|---|---|
| 1980 | 2,867 | | — |
| 1990 | 3,250 | | 13.4% |
| 2000 | 3,101 | | −4.6% |
| 2010 | 3,079 | | −0.7% |
| 2020 | 3,459 | | 12.3% |
U.S. Decennial Census

=== 2020 census ===
As of the 2020 census, North River Shores had a population of 3,459. The median age was 55.4 years. 15.4% of residents were under the age of 18 and 33.2% of residents were 65 years of age or older. For every 100 females, there were 94.4 males, and for every 100 females age 18 and over, there were 90.9 males age 18 and over.

100.0% of residents lived in urban areas, while 0.0% lived in rural areas.

There were 1,685 households in North River Shores, of which 17.5% had children under the age of 18 living in them. Of all households, 42.0% were married-couple households, 20.9% were households with a male householder and no spouse or partner present, and 32.3% were households with a female householder and no spouse or partner present. About 38.6% of all households were made up of individuals and 23.4% had someone living alone who was 65 years of age or older. There were 898 families in the CDP.

There were 2,038 housing units, of which 17.3% were vacant. The homeowner vacancy rate was 1.5% and the rental vacancy rate was 13.5%.

North River Shores racial composition (Hispanics excluded from racial categories) (NH = Non-Hispanic)
| Race | Number | Percentage |
|---|---|---|
| White (NH) | 2,994 | 86.56% |
| Black or African American (NH) | 50 | 1.45% |
| Native American or Alaska Native (NH) | 4 | 0.12% |
| Asian (NH) | 32 | 0.93% |
| Some Other Race (NH) | 19 | 0.55% |
| Mixed/Multi-Racial (NH) | 119 | 3.44% |
| Hispanic or Latino | 241 | 6.97% |
| Total | 3,459 | |

=== 2000 census ===
As of the census of 2000, there were 3,101 people, 1,417 households, and 916 families residing in the CDP. The population density was 2,385.8 inhabitants per square mile (921.2/km^{2}). There were 1,701 housing units at an average density of 1,308.7 per square mile (505.3/km^{2}). The racial makeup of the CDP was 97.84% White, 0.52% African American, 0.13% Native American, 0.61% Asian, 0.26% from other races, and 0.64% from two or more races. Hispanic or Latino of any race were 1.81% of the population.

There were 1,417 households, out of which 21.4% had children under the age of 18 living with them, 54.7% were married couples living together, 7.6% had a female householder with no husband present, and 35.3% were non-families. 29.5% of all households were made up of individuals, and 17.8% had someone living alone who was 65 years of age or older. The average household size was 2.18 and the average family size was 2.68.

In the CDP, the population was spread out, with 17.8% under the age of 18, 4.6% from 18 to 24, 21.8% from 25 to 44, 25.3% from 45 to 64, and 30.5% who were 65 years of age or older. The median age was 49 years. For every 100 females, there were 89.3 males. For every 100 females age 18 and over, there were 85.4 males.

The median income for a household in the CDP was $43,813, and the median income for a family was $55,052. Males had a median income of $47,330 versus $26,118 for females. The per capita income for the CDP was $28,449. About 5.6% of families and 5.3% of the population were below the poverty line, including 11.2% of those under age 18 and 2.0% of those age 65 or over.
