= List of former state roads in Florida =

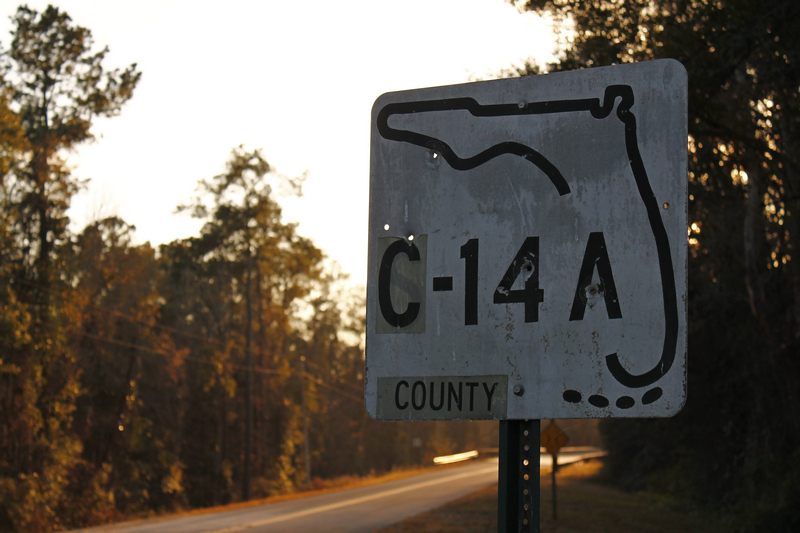
- Example of "C-" prefix added to sign of a decommissioned state road

Highway names
- State: State Road X (SR X)
- County: County Road X (CR X)

System links
- Florida State Highway System; Interstate; US; State; Former; Pre‑1945; Toll; Scenic

== History ==
In the mid-1970s, the Florida Department of Transportation (formerly the State Road Department) started a sequence of events that eventually resulted in the transferral of hundred of miles of roadway from State of Florida maintenance to county control. The first step was the addition of an "S-" or "C-" prefix onto the original FDOT designation ("S" represented "secondary"; "C" represented "county").

In 1977, House Bill 803, Chapter 77–165 in the Laws of Florida, was passed in the Florida Legislature. This transportation policy act eliminated the State Highway Secondary System which consisted of county roads that were maintained by the state. The provisions went into effect on July 1, 1977.

State Road signs started disappearing from the "C" roads and were replaced by Manual on Uniform Traffic Control Devices (MUTCD) compliant county road signs in the early 1980s; the transition of "S" roads to county control took a bit longer. Many roads that were decommissioned in later years skipped the prefix step.

The following is a list of former state roads in Florida:

== 1–99 ==
- State Road 4A
- State Road 4B
- State Road 5A (now County Road 5A) – Old Dixie Highway from near Wabasso Road (SR 510) in Wabasso to the former SR 605 in Vero Beach
- State Road 5A (now County Road 5A): Flagler Street from First Street to South Roosevelt Boulevard (SR A1A) in Key West. Commercially prepared road maps still indicate incorrectly that CR 5A is still a State Road (when it was, it was not signed as such). Some maps even suggest that it includes White Street between US 1 and Flagler Street.
- State Road 14A
- State Road 15A and 15B (now County Road 15A and 15B) – two short roads connecting US 98-441 (SR 15-700) and SR 710 near Up the Grove Beach
- State Road 15C (now County Road 15C) – a spur from SR 15 near Fort Drum
- State Road 16A
- State Road 17A
- State Road A19A
- State Road 20A
- State Road 20B
- State Road 21A
- State Road 21B
- State Road 21C
- State Road 21D
- State Road 23 (now County Road 23): 122nd Street near Gainesvile.
- State Road 23A (now Alachua County Road 23A and Baker County Road 23A): Old Archer Road in Gainesville and multiple streets in and around MacClenny.
- State Road 23B (now County Road 23B):
- State Road 23C (now County Road 23C):
- State Road 23D (now County Road 23D):
- State Road 23E
- State Road 23F (now County Road 23F):
- State Road 25A was downgraded to Lake/Marion/Alachua/Hamilton and Columbia County Road 25A. Lake and Marion Counties have assigned this designation to two separate routes. A segment of State Road 25A still exists, but as a hidden state route for US 441 in Lake City, which itself branches off to the northwest along Columbia County Road 25A.
- State Road 25B (now County Road 25B): includes Northwest 174th Avenue, Southeast 17th Street and Northwest 222nd Street in High Springs.
- State Road 29A
- State Road 30A
- State Road 30B
- State Road 30C
- State Road 30D
- State Road 30E
- State Road 30F
- State Road 30G
- State Road 30H
- State Road 30J
- State Road 33A (downgraded to County Road 33A (Polk County, Florida), later restored to state road status as State Road 659)
- State Road 35A
- State Road 35B
- State Road 39A
- State Road 39B
- State Road 40A (now County Road 40A in Levy County, and County Road 4053 near DeLand and County Road 4118 in New Smyrna Beach, Volusia County)
- State Road 48 originally ran from Floral City to Howey-in-the-Hills, but was truncated to Interstate 75 and US Route 301 in Bushnell. In 2016, the last state section of the road was turned over to Sumter County.
- State Road 64A (part now 636)
- State Road 69A
- State Road 71A
- State Road 73A
- State Road 73B
- State Road 74
- State Road 77A
- State Road 77B
- State Road 77C
- State Road 78A - now County Road 78A
- State Road 78B
- State Road 80A
- State Road 81A
- State Road 95A
- State Road 97A
- State Road 100A
- State Road 100B

== 101–200 ==
- State Road 101A
- State Road 105A (now County Road 105A (Nassau County, Florida))
- State Road 106
- State Road 106A
- State Road 106B
- State Road 108 (now County Road 108 (Nassau County, Florida))
- State Road 110
- State Road 115B
- State Road 115C
- State Road 119
- State Road 121A
- State Road 124
- State Road 125
- State Road 127
- State Road 130
- State Road 131 (now County Road 131 (Columbia County, Florida))
- State Road 132 (now County Road 132 (Suwannee County, Florida))
- State Road 132A
- State Road 133
- State Road 133A
- State Road 133B
- State Road 133C
- State Road 135 (now County Road 135 (Hamilton County, Florida))
- State Road 137 (now County Road 137 (Suwannee County, Florida) and County Road 137 (Hamilton County, Florida))
- State Road 137A
- State Road 138
- State Road 139A
- State Road 139B
- State Road 141 (now Madison / Hamilton County Road 141) - Ran from US 90 in Twin Rivers State Forest to the Florida-Georgia Line north of Jennings
- State Road 142- SR 151 in Felkel to US 19 in Monticello- now County Road 142
- State Road 144- now County Road 346
- State Road 146- SR 146 in Tallahassee to Miccosukee- now County Road 146
- State Road 148
- State Road 149
- State Road 150 (now County Road 150) – two sections: one from US 19/US 27 in rural Madison County to US 221 in Greenville; another from US 90 east of Greenville to former SR 152 in Hamilton County.
- State Road 151- Tallahassee to Georgia- now County Road 151
- State Road 152 (now County Road 152) – ran from the Former State Road 150 bridge over the Withlacoochee River in Belville, to US 41 southeast of Jennings.
- State Road 153
- State Road 157A
- State Road 158- SR 155 to SR 263- now County Road 158
- State Road 159A
- State Road 160
- State Road 161
- State Road 161A
- State Road 162
- State Road 163
- State Road 164
- State Road 164A
- State Road 164B
- State Road 165
- State Road 167 (now County Road 2301 and County Road 167) – two sections: one from US 231 in Bayou George north of Panama City to SR 20 west of Fountain, now CR 2301; another from US 231 in Betts through the northwest corner of Calhoun County then into Jackson County where it eventually joins SR 267 south of Marianna. After I-10, the road branches off to South Street and runs east until joining SR 73, where it turns north until the intersection with US 90. Here SR 73 turns west, and CR 167 joins SR 166, until it turns onto "Old US Road" and runs north toward the Alabama State Line.
- State Road 168
- State Road 169
- State Road 171
- State Road 172
- State Road 175
- State Road 176
- State Road 177
- State Road 177A
- State Road 179
- State Road 179A
- State Road 181
- State Road 181A
- State Road 182
- State Road 183
- State Road 183A
- State Road 184
- State Road 185
- State Road 186
- State Road 193
- State Road 194
- State Road 195
- State Road 200A

== 201-300 ==
- State Road 201
- State Road 203
- State Road 205
- State Road 209
- State Road 209A
- State Road 209B
- State Road 213
- State Road 214
- State Road 215
- State Road 217
- State Road 218
- State Road 219
- State Road 219A
- State Road 220
- State Road 220A
- State Road 220B
- State Road 224
- State Road 224A
- State Road 224B
- State Road 225
- State Road 225A
- State Road 227
- State Road 229
- State Road 232
- State Road 233
- State Road 234
- State Road 235A
- State Road 236 was downgraded to Dixie / Gilchrist / Alachua County Road 236 in 1977, now Dixie / Gilchrist / Alachua County Road 340.
- State Road 237
- State Road 239
- State Road 240
- State Road 241
- State Road 242
- State Road 245
- State Road 245A
- State Road 246
- State Road 250
- State Road 250A
- State Road 252
- State Road 252A
- State Road 252B
- State Road 256
- State Road 259 (now Leon / Jefferson County Road 259) - also known as "The Old Tram Road," Tram Road, Limestone Road, Wacissa Highway, and Waukeenah Highway, is a bi-county route that serves southeastern Leon County and western Jefferson County, Florida. The western terminus is an intersection with Monroe Street (SR 61) in Tallahassee; the northern terminus is an intersection with US 19 (SR 57) in Monticello. Communities served along its route also include Corey, Cody, Limestone, Wacissa, Thomas City, Waukeenah, and Casa Blanco. Leon County Road 259 is signed east–west, while Jefferson County Road 259 is signed east–west on Tram Road and Paradise Road, and signed north–south between SR 59 and the northern terminus.
- State Road 260- now Leon County Road 260
- State Road 263A
- State Road 264
- State Road 267A
- State Road 268
- State Road 268A
- State Road 269
- State Road 269A
- State Road 269B
- State Road 270
- State Road 270A
- State Road 271
- State Road 272
- State Road 274
- State Road 275
- State Road 275A
- State Road 275B
- State Road 276A
- State Road 278
- State Road 280
- State Road 280A
- State Road 286
- State Road 287
- State Road 287A
- State Road 289A
- State Road 290 (Now Escambia County Road 290)
- State Road 292A
- State Road 295A
- State Road 296A
- State Road 297A
- State Road 298A
- State Road 299

== 301–400 ==
- State Road 302
- State Road 303
- State Road 304
- State Road 305
- State Road 307
- State Road 313
- State Road 315
- State Road 317
- State Road 319
- State Road 325
- State Road 329
- State Road 329A
- State Road 329B
- State Road 334
- State Road 334A
- State Road 335
- State Road 337
- State Road 338
- State Road 339
- State Road 340
- State Road 340A
- State Road 341
- State Road 341A
- State Road 342, (now County Road 500 (Lafayette County, Florida))
- State Road 344
- State Road 346
- State Road 346A
- State Road 351
- State Road 352
- State Road 353
- State Road 356
- State Road 357
- State Road 358
- State Road 359
- State Road 359A
- State Road 359B
- State Road 361
- State Road 361A
- State Road 361B
- State Road 365
- State Road 367
- State Road 367A
- State Road 370
- State Road 372A
- State Road 372B
- State Road 374
- State Road 376
- State Road 379
- State Road 379A
- State Road 379B
- State Road 381
- State Road 381A
- State Road 382
- State Road 384
- State Road 384A
- State Road 385
- State Road 386
- State Road 386A
- State Road 387
- State Road 388
- State Road 389A
- State Road 390A
- State Road 392
- State Road 392A
- State Road 392B
- State Road 394
- State Road 396
- State Road 396A
- State Road 398
- State Road 398A

== 401–500 ==
- State Road 402 (now County Road 402) – Max Brewer Memorial Parkway, a primary access road for Merritt Island National Wildlife Refuge and Canaveral National Seashore near Titusville
- State Road 406A – a 0.5-mile-long (0.80 km) street connecting SR 405 and SR 406 in Titusville
- State Road 420 (now County Road 576 (Hernando County, Florida)) – Ayers Road from US 41 in Masaryktown to CR 581, and Hayman Boulevard from CR 581 to CR 541 south of Spring Lake.
- State Road 424A
- State Road 425
- State Road 427
- State Road 428
- State Road 431
- State Road 436A
- State Road 437
- State Road 437A
- State Road 439
- State Road 443
- State Road 445
- State Road 448
- State Road 453
- State Road 470
- State Road 475
- State Road 476
- State Road 476A
- State Road 480
- State Road 481
- State Road 484
- State Road 485
- State Road 485A
- State Road 485B
- State Road 486
- State Road 488
- State Road 489
- State Road 490
- State Road 490A
- State Road 491
- State Road 491A
- State Road 493
- State Road 494
- State Road 495
- State Road 498

== 501–600 ==
- State Road 501A - Dixon Blvd between Clearlake Road (SR501) and US 1 in Cocoa
- State Road 502 – Barnes Boulevard in Rockledge
- State Road 503
- State Road 505 (now County Road 615) – 66th Avenue between Wabasso Road (CR 510) near Sebastian and Osceola Boulevard (SR 60) near Vero Beach
- State Road 505A (now County Road 613) – Kings Highway/58th Avenue between Wabasso Road (CR 510) in Wabasso and Oslo Road (former State Road and current County Road 606) near Vero Beach
- State Road 506
- State Road 509 (now part of County Road 509) – Minton Road in West Melbourne
- State Road 511 (now part of County Road 511) – John Rodes Boulevard in West Melbourne between US 192 and SR 518
- State Road 512 (now County Road 512) – Fellsmere Road from SR 60 in Saint Johns Marsh to US 1 (SR 5) in Sebastian
- State Road 514 (now part of County Road 514) – Malabar Road east of Interstate 95 (SR 9) in Palm Bay and Malabar
- State Road 515 (now County Road 515) – "The Scenic Trail" along the Indian River in Cocoa and Rockledge
- State Road 516
- State Road 520A – Lake Poinsett Road, a spur of SR 520 near Cocoa
- State Road 527A
- State Road 528A
- State Road 529
- State Road 532
- State Road 537
- State Road 541
- State Road 545
- State Road 545A
- State Road 550
- State Road 571
- State Road 572
- State Road 574A
- State Road 574B
- State Road 576
- State Road 577
- State Road 578
- State Road 581A
- State Road 582A - Now C.R. 582A on Fletcher Avenue east of Nebraska Avenue in Tampa. See SR 579
- State Road 582B – Now under county control on North 50th Street between Fowler Avenue (SR 582) and Fletcher Avenue in Tampa
- State Road 583A
- State Road 584
- State Road 585 - Replaced by the I-4/Selmon Expressway Connector to the east, the former state road is now locally maintained by the City of Tampa.
- State Road 585A
- State Road 587
- State Road 587A
- State Road 593
- State Road 598

== 601–700 ==
- State Road 603 (now part of County Road 603) – Johnston Road between Indrio Road (SR 614) and the Indian County boundary near Lakewood Park
- State Road 605 – stretches of Old Dixie Highway in Indian River and St. Lucie counties between Wabasso and Fort Pierce
- State Road 607A – Angle Road in Fort Pierce
- State Road 609 (now County Road 609) – Hale Dairy Road between the Glades Cut-off (former SR 709) and Bee Line Highway (SR 710) near Indiantown
- State Road 609 – Header Canal Road between Okeechobee Road (SR 70) and Orange Avenue (SR 68) near Fort Pierce
- State Road 609A – Shinn Road between Okeechobee Road (SR 70) and Orange Avenue (SR 68) near Fort Pierce
- State Road 611 had various alignments near and in Fort Pierce, most incorporating Jenkins Road and Edwards Road
- State Road 611A – Juanita Avenue between North 16th Street and US 1 in Fort Pierce
- State Road 611B (now part of County Road 611) – Selvitz Road north of Port St. Lucie and Edwards Boulevard in Fort Pierce
- State Road 612 (now County Road 612) – Glendale Avenue in Vero Beach
- State Road 613 (now County Road 613) – Sneed Road and Carlton Road in southwestern St. Lucie County
- State Road 617 (now part of County Road 614) – Indrio Road between SR 713 and US 1 near Lakewood Park
- State Road 619
- State Road 620
- State Road 621
- State Road 623
- State Road 627
- State Road 630 – 41st Street between CR 613 (former SR 505A) and CR 605 (former SR 605) in Vero Beach
- State Road 632 – South Winter Beach Road near Winter Beach
- State Road 634
- State Road 634A
- State Road 635
- State Road 636 (current one former SR 64A)
- State Road 640
- State Road 652
- State Road 660
- State Road 661
- State Road 661A
- State Road 663
- State Road 663A
- State Road 664
- State Road 664A
- State Road 664B
- State Road 665
- State Road 667
- State Road 668
- State Road 671
- State Road 676A
- State Road 685A
- State Road 700A – Durance Road, a spur from US 98 (SR 700) near Basinger

== 701–800 ==
- State Road 702 (now County Road 702) – 45th Street in West Palm Beach and Mangonia Park between Florida's Turnpike and US 1
- State Road 703
- State Road 704A (now County Road 704A) – Australian Avenue between Southern Boulevard (US 98-SR 80) and Okeechobee Boulevard (SR 704) in West Palm Beach
- State Road 705
- State Road 707A (now County Road 732) – Jensen Beach Boulevard in West Jensen
- State Road 708 (now County Road 708) – Bridge Road from SR 76 to US 1 near Hobe Sound
- State Road 709 (now County Road 709) – the Glades Cut-off between Port Saint Lucie and Bluefield
- State Road 712 (now County Road 712) – Midway Road (also known as White City Road) from SR 70 near Fort Pierce to CR 707 near Eldred
- State Road 712A
- State Road 712B
- State Road 719
- State Road 720 (now County Road 720) – from US 27 near Moore Haven to US 27/SR 80 near Shawnee

- State Road 721 (now County Road 721) – from SR 78 near Lakeport, through the Brighton Indian Reservation, to US 98 near Cornwell. A spur in the reservation was signed State Road 721A.
- State Road 722
- State Road 723 (now County Road 723) – Savannah Road in Jensen Beach
- State Road 724 (now County Road 724) – Peavine Trail north of Basinger and Eagle Island Road west of US 441/SR 15. The eastern terminus was just south of Fort Drum.
- State Road 731 (now County Road 731) – from County Road 74 to County Road 17 near Venus
- State Road 733
- State Road 735
- State Road 739A
- State Road 739B
- State Road 743
- State Road 744
- State Road 746
- State Road 747
- State Road 749
- State Road 751
- State Road 757
- State Road 760
- State Road 760A
- State Road 761
- State Road 762
- State Road 763
- State Road 764
- State Road 765 (now County Road 765) – from SR 78 near Fort Myers to US 41 (Tamiami Trail) near South Punta Gorda
- State Road 765A
- State Road 767 (now County Road 767) – Stringfellow Road from Saint James City to Bokeelia on Pine Island near Cape Coral
- State Road 768
- State Road 769
- State Road 771 (now County Road 771) – from Boca Grande on Gasparilla Island to SR 776 near El Jobean, crossing Gasparilla Sound via the toll Gasparilla Bridge.
- State Road 773 (now County Road 773) – from Fruitville Road (SR 780) in Sarasota to US 41 (Tamiami Trail) near Coral Cove
- State Road 775 (now County Road 775) – from County Road 771 near Placida to US 41 (Tamiami Trail) near Venice. After the SR 775 signs received the "S-" designation, much of the route became the westernmost third of SR 776.
- State Road 776A
- State Road 778
- State Road 782 (now County Road 782) – Linton Boulevard in Delray Beach
- State Road 785
- State Road 787
- State Road 798 (now County Road 798) – Palmetto Park Road in Boca Raton

== 801–900 ==
- State Road 809A
- State Road 811A (now County Road 811A) – from Sunrise Boulevard (SR 838) in Fort Lauderdale to Atlantic Boulevard (SR 814) in Pompano Beach
- State Road 812 (now County Road 812) – Lantana Road from US 441-SR 7 to US 1 near Lantana
- State Road 815
- State Road 819
- State Road 824A
- State Road 827
- State Road 828
- State Road 830
- State Road 830A
- State Road 832 (now County Road 832) – from SR 29 near Felda to County Road 833
- State Road 833 (now County Road 833) – from Interstate 75 (Alligator Alley) in the Miccosukee Indian Reservation, through the Big Cypress Indian Reservation to SR 80 east of Goodno
- State Road 835
- State Road 837
- State Road 839
- State Road 840 - now County Road 840
- State Road 841
- State Road 846 (now County Road 846) – from US 41 (Tamiami Trail) in Naples Park to County Road 833 east of Immokalee
- State Road 848
- State Road 850 (now County Road 850) – from Corkscrew to SR 82 northwest of Immokalee
- State Road 850 - Northlake Boulevard from SR 811 to US 1. Decommissioned in 2018 in exchange for a county maintained segment of SR 7.
- State Road 851
- State Road 854 (now County Road 854) – from State Road 823 to US 1
- State Road 858 (now County Road 858) – loop from County Road 846 through Big Cypress Swamp to Sunnyland Station.
- State Road 862
- State Road 864
- State Road 867A - now County Road 867A
- State Road 869 (now County Road 869) – Summerlin Road from Truckland to Fort Myers
- State Road 872
- State Road 881
- State Road 886 (now County Road 886) – from US 41 (Tamiami Trail) near North Naples to County Road 951 near Golden Gate
- State Road 887 - now County Road 887, Florida State Road 887 is now a designation for the Port Miami Tunnel.
- State Road 888 (now County Road 888) – from County Road 901 to US 41
- State Road 890
- State Road 892 (now County Road 892) – formerly State Road 92A.
- State Road 894
- State Road 896
- State Road 898

== 901–1000 ==
- State Road 901 (now Lee / Collier County Road 901) – from SR 865 at Bonita Springs to County Road 862 in Naples
- State Road 905 (now County Road 905): a spur from US 1 from Key Largo to the Ocean Reef Club near Grayvik in the northern tip of Largo Key. The southern half of CR 905 was part of the Overseas Highway from 1938 until 1944 (when a fire damaged Card Sound Bridge). Old "State Road S-905" signs are still posted on the edge of the road.

- State Road 905A (now County Road 905A) is the Card Sound Bridge and Card Sound Road between the bridge and CR 905 (SR 905A used to extend northward to an intersection with US 1 near Florida City, but Miami-Dade County doesn't sign its county roads and rarely designates them as "County Road ###"). As late as 2005, an old "State Road S-905A" was still posted near the intersection with CR 905.
- State Road 906
- State Road 908
- State Road 912
- State Road 917
- State Road 919
- State Road 929
- State Road 930
- State Road 931 (now County Road 931): a loop south of US 1 in Marathon on Boot Key and Vaca Key.
- State Road 936

- State Road 939 (now County Road 939): locally known as Sugarloaf Boulevard and Old State Road, CR 939 forms a loop south of US 1 on Sugarloaf Key. The western terminus is in Perky; the road follows the contour of the island as it turns around Upper Sugarloaf Sound.

- State Road 939A is a spur south of US 1 from Lower Sugarloaf Key, traveling southeast on the island as Sugarloaf Boulevard to end at old SR 4A and SR 939B. The "SR 939A" symbol still exists on modern maps.

- State Road 939B is a spur south of US 1 from Sugarloaf Key, traveling south through Pirate's Cove and west on the island to end at old SR 4A and SR 939B. The "SR 939B" symbol still exists on modern maps.
- State Road 940 (northern segment now County Road 940): Big Pine Avenue and Elma Avenue on Big Pine Key. This is the only state road – current or former – that has segments on both sides of the Overseas Highway. A street extending eastward from Big Pine Avenue onto No Name Key is locally known as SR 4A (see "State Road 5", above). Much of Big Pine Avenue is located in National Key Deer Refuge.
- State Road 941 (now County Road 941): a spur south of US 1 from Big Coppitt Key and El Chico, travelling southwest on Bird Key and Geiger Key to end at the Key West Naval Air Station on Boca Chica Key.
- State Road 942 signs have been placed on at least two streets at different times. Both were spurs southward from US 1:
  - Maloney Avenue (now not state- or county-designated) on Stock Island. The northern end is near Florida Keys Community College.
  - Shore Drive (now County Road 942) on Summerland Key.
- State Road 945
- State Road 945A
- State Road 952
- State Road 954
- State Road 955
- State Road 956
- State Road 974

== 1001–9999 ==
- State Road 4081
- State Road 5098
- State Road 9823
