= Florida State Road 68 =

State highway in Florida, United States

State Road 68 and County Road 68
- SR 68 highlighted in red and CR 68 in blue

Route information
- Maintained by FDOT and St. Lucie County
- Length: 29.695 mi (47.789 km) 4.495 miles (7.234 km) as SR 68

Major junctions
- West end: US 441 near Okeechobee
- SR 713 near Fort Pierce; I-95 near Fort Pierce
- East end: US 1 in Fort Pierce

Location
- Country: United States
- State: Florida
- County: St. Lucie

Highway system
- Florida State Highway System; Interstate; US; State; Former; Pre‑1945; Toll; Scenic
← SR 66	→ SR 69

Known locally as Orange Avenue, State Road 68 (SR 68) is a 4.5-mile-long east–west street in Fort Pierce, Florida. The eastern terminus of SR 68 is at an intersection with North Fourth Street (US 1-SR 5); the roadway continues east a short distance towards Indian River Drive (County Road 707) in downtown Fort Pierce without state or county designation. The western terminus is with Kings Highway (SR 713), just west of Interstate 95 (SR 9). West of Kings Highway, Orange Avenue transitions into County Road 68, heading west for another 25.2 miles (40.6 km), maintaining the CR 68 designation as it crosses into Okeechobee County before ending at an intersection with US 441.

Initially a key road in the citrus industry, SR 68 has since become an important commuter road providing the residences of central Fort Pierce with access to Interstate 95 (SR 9) 0.3 miles east of SR 713. The rural nature of the western end of SR 68 is slowly giving way to urbanization, a trend throughout the Atlantic coast of the State of Florida, as orange groves are gradually being replaced by residential developments.

== History ==
The historic western terminus of State Road 68 is about 42 miles (68 km) west of the current one. Originally, SR 68 extended from Micco Bluff Road in Okeechobee County west of Basinger near the Kissimmee River, following US 98-SR 700, Northeast 160th Street (present County Road 68), Parrott Avenue (US 441-SR 15), Northeast 224th Street (present County Road 68), and the aptly named Orange Avenue (present County Road 68) to SR 713 as it cuts across the wetlands and the orange groves of central Florida to Fort Pierce. All portions of SR 68 in Okeechobee County as well as the portion from the St. Lucie County east to Kings Highway were transferred to county control in the mid-1980s.

In the late 1990s, the alignment of SR 68 immediately west of US 1 was changed - Orange Avenue between N 7th Street and US 1 was made into an eastbound one-way road, carrying SR 68 along its 2 lanes towards US 1; westbound SR 68 was rerouted one block north of Orange Avenue along Avenue A. From US 1, Avenue A headed west as a 4-lane one-way street for two blocks before ending at N 7th Street. Traffic wishing to follow SR 68 west were forced to turn left onto N 7th Street, then immediately turn right one block later onto Orange Avenue and SR 68 west. A few years later, in the late 2000s, Orange Avenue between N 7th Street and US 1 was restored to two-way traffic, ending the ill-advised and short-lived Avenue A and N 7th Street's SR 68 designation.

== Major intersections ==
County	Location	mi	km	Destinations	Notes
Okeechobee		0.0	0.0	US 441 / SR 15	Road is unsigned SR 15; 4 miles to the south, CR 68 continues westbound along NW 160th Street.
St. Lucie		17.2	27.7	CR 613 south (Sneed Road)	Northern terminus of CR 613
St. Lucie		19.2	30.9	CR 609 south (Header Canal Road)	Northern terminus of CR 609
St. Lucie		19.7	31.7	CR 609A south (Shinn Road)	Northern terminus of CR 609A
St. Lucie		25.2 0.000	40.6 0.000	SR 713 (Kings Highway) to Florida's Turnpike – Airport	Transition from CR 68 to SR 68
St. Lucie		0.31	0.50	I-95 – Daytona Beach, West Palm Beach	Exit 131 on I-95 (SR 9)
St. Lucie		1.006	1.619	CR 611 south (Jenkins Road)	Northern terminus of southern section of CR 611
St. Lucie	Fort Pierce	2.524	4.062	CR 607A west (Angle Road)	Eastern terminus of CR 607A
St. Lucie	Fort Pierce	3.022	4.863	SR 615 (25th Street) – Airport	
St. Lucie	Fort Pierce	4.495	7.234	US 1 (SR 5) / Orange Avenue east	Continues east without designation
1.000 mi = 1.609 km; 1.000 km = 0.621 mi: Route transition
