= River Park, Florida =

- Census-designated place
- Location in St. Lucie County and the state of Florida
- Coordinates: 27°19′17″N 80°19′51″W
- Country: United States
- State: Florida
- County: St. Lucie

Area
  - Total: 2.54 sq mi (6.57 km^{2})
  - Land: 2.35 sq mi (6.09 km^{2})
  - Water: 0.19 sq mi (0.48 km^{2})
- Elevation: 0 ft (0 m)

Population (2020)
  - Total: 6,514
  - Density: 2,770.1/sq mi (1,069.55/km^{2})
- Time zone: UTC-5 (Eastern (EST))
  - Summer (DST): UTC-4 (EDT)
- FIPS code: 12-58725
- GNIS ID: 2403440

River Park is a census-designated place (CDP) in St. Lucie County, Florida, United States. As of the 2020 census, River Park had a population of 6,514. The population was 5,222 at the 2010 census, at which time it was listed as Port St. Lucie-River Park. It is part of the Port St. Lucie Metropolitan Statistical Area.

== Geography ==
According to the United States Census Bureau, the CDP has a total area of 2.5 square miles (6.5 km^{2}), of which 2.3 square miles (6.1 km^{2}) is land and 0.2 square mile (0.5 km^{2}) (7.17%) is water.

== Demographics ==
Historical population
Census	Pop.	Note	%±
1990	4,874		—
2000	5,175		6.2%
2010	5,222		0.9%
2020	6,514		24.7%

=== 2020 census ===
As of the 2020 census, River Park had a population of 6,514. The median age was 50.4 years. 16.3% of residents were under the age of 18 and 26.9% of residents were 65 years of age or older. For every 100 females there were 95.3 males, and for every 100 females age 18 and over there were 92.5 males age 18 and over.

100.0% of residents lived in urban areas, while 0.0% lived in rural areas.

There were 2,873 households in River Park, of which 21.2% had children under the age of 18 living in them. Of all households, 37.5% were married-couple households, 23.0% were households with a male householder and no spouse or partner present, and 31.5% were households with a female householder and no spouse or partner present. About 33.4% of all households were made up of individuals and 18.9% had someone living alone who was 65 years of age or older.

There were 3,202 housing units, of which 10.3% were vacant. The homeowner vacancy rate was 2.8% and the rental vacancy rate was 7.0%.

Racial composition as of the 2020 census
Race	Number	Percent
White	4,194	64.4%
Black or African American	715	11.0%
American Indian and Alaska Native	29	0.4%
Asian	87	1.3%
Native Hawaiian and Other Pacific Islander	2	0.0%
Some other race	523	8.0%
Two or more races	964	14.8%
Hispanic or Latino (of any race)	1,480	22.7%

=== 2010 census ===
As of the census of 2010, there were 5,222 people, 2,383 households, and 1,467 families residing in the CDP. The population density was 2,215.5 inhabitants per square mile (855.4/km^{2}). There were 2,698 housing units at an average density of 1,155.1 per square mile (446.0/km^{2}). The racial makeup of the CDP was 91.07% White, 4.77% African American, 0.19% Native American, 1.10% Asian, 0.02% Pacific Islander, 1.72% from other races, and 1.12% from two or more races. Hispanic or Latino of any race were 6.42% of the population.

There were 2,383 households, out of which 17.0% had children under the age of 18 living with them, 48.9% were married couples living together, 8.8% had a female householder with no husband present, and 38.4% were non-families. 31.4% of all households were made up of individuals, and 21.0% had someone living alone who was 65 years of age or older. The average household size was 2.16 and the average family size was 2.66.

In the CDP, the population was spread out, with 16.6% under the age of 18, 5.0% from 18 to 24, 22.2% from 25 to 44, 22.2% from 45 to 64, and 34.0% who were 65 years of age or older. The median age was 51 years. For every 100 females, there were 92.2 males. For every 100 females age 18 and over, there were 87.2 males.

The median income for a household in the CDP was $30,284, and the median income for a family was $36,932. Males had a median income of $28,409 versus $21,038 for females. The per capita income for the CDP was $22,217. About 4.4% of families and 9.2% of the population were below the poverty line, including 11.1% of those under age 18 and 7.0% of those age 65 or over.
