= Indian River Estates, Florida =

- CDP
- Location in St. Lucie County and the state of Florida
- Coordinates: 27°21′52″N 80°18′03″W
- Country: United States
- State: Florida
- County: St. Lucie

Area
  - Total: 5.98 sq mi (15.48 km^{2})
  - Land: 5.57 sq mi (14.43 km^{2})
  - Water: 0.41 sq mi (1.05 km^{2})
- Elevation: 16 ft (4.9 m)

Population (2020)
  - Total: 6,584
  - Density: 1,182.0/sq mi (456.39/km^{2})
- Time zone: UTC-5 (Eastern (EST))
  - Summer (DST): UTC-4 (EDT)
- FIPS code: 12-33585
- GNIS feature ID: 2402611

Indian River Estates is a census-designated place (CDP) in St. Lucie County, Florida, United States. As of the 2020 census, Indian River Estates had a population of 6,584. It is part of the Port St. Lucie Metropolitan Statistical Area.

== Geography ==
According to the United States Census Bureau, the CDP has a total area of 5.8 square miles (15 km^{2}), of which 5.5 square miles (14 km^{2}) is land and 0.2 square miles (0.52 km^{2}) (3.65%) is water.

== Demographics ==
Historical population
Census	Pop.	Note	%±
1990	4,858		—
2000	5,793		19.2%
2010	6,220		7.4%
2020	6,584		5.9%

=== 2020 census ===
As of the 2020 census, Indian River Estates had a population of 6,584. The median age was 53.9 years. 15.8% of residents were under the age of 18 and 32.5% of residents were 65 years of age or older. For every 100 females there were 92.7 males, and for every 100 females age 18 and over there were 90.4 males age 18 and over.

100.0% of residents lived in urban areas, while 0.0% lived in rural areas.

There were 2,832 households in Indian River Estates, of which 19.7% had children under the age of 18 living in them. Of all households, 49.7% were married-couple households, 15.8% were households with a male householder and no spouse or partner present, and 27.0% were households with a female householder and no spouse or partner present. About 27.6% of all households were made up of individuals and 18.3% had someone living alone who was 65 years of age or older.

There were 3,085 housing units, of which 8.2% were vacant. The homeowner vacancy rate was 2.0% and the rental vacancy rate was 2.4%.

Racial composition as of the 2020 census
Race	Number	Percent
White	5,564	84.5%
Black or African American	212	3.2%
American Indian and Alaska Native	25	0.4%
Asian	45	0.7%
Native Hawaiian and Other Pacific Islander	1	0.0%
Some other race	165	2.5%
Two or more races	572	8.7%
Hispanic or Latino (of any race)	616	9.4%

=== 2010 census ===
As of the 2010 census, there were 6,220 people, 2,347 households, and 1,743 families residing in the CDP. The population density was 1,046.2 inhabitants per square mile (403.9/km^{2}). There were 2,494 housing units at an average density of 450.4 per square mile (173.9/km^{2}). The racial makeup of the CDP was 95.29% White, 2.31% African American, 0.19% Native American, 0.47% Asian, 0.07% Pacific Islander, 0.74% from other races, and 0.93% from two or more races. Hispanic or Latino of any race were 3.54% of the population.

There were 2,347 households, out of which 26.0% had children under the age of 18 living with them, 61.8% were married couples living together, 8.2% had a female householder with no husband present, and 25.7% were non-families. 20.1% of all households were made up of individuals, and 11.7% had someone living alone who was 65 years of age or older. The average household size was 2.45 and the average family size was 2.78.

In the CDP, the population was spread out, with 21.1% under the age of 18, 5.2% from 18 to 24, 24.4% from 25 to 44, 25.6% from 45 to 64, and 23.8% who were 65 years of age or older. The median age was 44 years. For every 100 females, there were 95.8 males. For every 100 females age 18 and over, there were 92.8 males.

The median income for a household in the CDP was $37,053, and the median income for a family was $40,790. Males had a median income of $28,857 versus $22,169 for females. The per capita income for the CDP was $16,824. About 6.4% of families and 7.7% of the population were below the poverty line, including 12.2% of those under age 18 and 2.6% of those age 65 or over.
