= White City, St. Lucie County, Florida =

White City, Florida
- CDP
- Location in St. Lucie County and the state of Florida
- Coordinates: 27°22′40″N 80°20′26″W
- Country: United States
- State: Florida
- County: St. Lucie

Area
  - Total: 5.02 sq mi (12.99 km^{2})
  - Land: 5.02 sq mi (12.99 km^{2})
  - Water: 0 sq mi (0.00 km^{2})
- Elevation: 7 ft (2.1 m)

Population (2020)
  - Total: 3,779
  - Density: 753.3/sq mi (290.84/km^{2})
- Time zone: UTC-5 (Eastern (EST))
  - Summer (DST): UTC-4 (EDT)
- FIPS code: 12-77275
- GNIS feature ID: 2403021

White City is a census-designated place (CDP) in St. Lucie County, Florida, United States. The population was 3,719 at the 2010 census. It is part of the Port St. Lucie Metropolitan Statistical Area.

== Geography ==
According to the United States Census Bureau, the CDP has a total area of 7.1 square miles (18 km^{2}), all land.

== Demographics ==
Historical population
Census	Pop.	Note	%±
2000	4,221		—
2010	3,719		−11.9%
2020	3,779		1.6%
U.S. Decennial Census

As of the census of 2010, there were 3,719 people, 1,563 households, and 1,150 families residing in the CDP. The population density was 597.7 inhabitants per square mile (230.8/km^{2}). There were 1,662 housing units at an average density of 235.3 per square mile (90.8/km^{2}). The racial makeup of the CDP was 93.60% White, 2.32% African American, 0.28% Native American, 0.95% Asian, 0.07% Pacific Islander, 1.14% from other races, and 1.63% from two or more races. Hispanic or Latino of any race were 4.67% of the population.

There were 1,563 households, out of which 31.8% had children under the age of 18 living with them, 58.6% were married couples living together, 10.2% had a female householder with no husband present, and 26.4% were non-families. 20.5% of all households were made up of individuals, and 7.7% had someone living alone who was 65 years of age or older. The average household size was 2.65 and the average family size was 3.02.

In the CDP, the population was spread out, with 25.0% under the age of 18, 7.5% from 18 to 24, 28.5% from 25 to 44, 26.7% from 45 to 64, and 12.4% who were 65 years of age or older. The median age was 39 years. For every 100 females, there were 98.9 males. For every 100 females age 18 and over, there were 99.0 males.

The median income for a household in the CDP was $42,165, and the median income for a family was $54,563. Males had a median income of $31,136 versus $25,495 for females. The per capita income for the CDP was $20,818. About 7.4% of families and 11.1% of the population were below the poverty line, including 14.6% of those under age 18 and 7.9% of those age 65 or over.
