= St. Lucie Village, Florida =

Town in Florida, United States

- Town
- Town of St. Lucie Village
- Location in St. Lucie County and the state of Florida
- Coordinates: 27°30′07″N 80°20′36″W
- Country: United States
- State: Florida
- County: St. Lucie
- Settled: 1843
- Incorporated: May 6, 1961

Government
  - Type: Mayor-Aldermen
  - Mayor: William G. Thiess
  - Vice Mayor: John Langel
  - Aldermen: Paul Sinnott, Lisa K. Price, Dale Reed, and Ingrid VanHekken
  - Town Clerk: Paulette Burgess
  - Town Attorney: Richard V. Neill Jr.

Area
  - Total: 0.91 sq mi (2.35 km^{2})
  - Land: 0.90 sq mi (2.32 km^{2})
  - Water: 0.0077 sq mi (0.02 km^{2})
- Elevation: 3 ft (0.91 m)

Population (2020)
  - Total: 613
  - Density: 682.9/sq mi (263.67/km^{2})
- Time zone: UTC-5 (Eastern (EST))
  - Summer (DST): UTC-4 (EDT)
- ZIP code: 34946
- Area code: 772
- FIPS code: 12-62800
- GNIS feature ID: 2015547
- Website: stlucievillagefl.gov

St. Lucie Village or Saint Lucie Village is a town in St. Lucie County, Florida, United States. It is part of the Port St. Lucie Metropolitan Statistical Area. The population was 613 at the 2020 census.

== History ==
St. Lucie Village was settled in 1843. It was incorporated as a town in 1961. Part of the town has been designated the St. Lucie Village Historic District, which has the oldest surviving building in town; a home that was built in 1875.

== Geography ==
According to the United States Census Bureau, the town has a total area of 0.8 square miles (2.1 km^{2}), all land.

=== Climate ===
St. Lucie Village is located in the broad transition zone between a humid subtropical climate (Cfa), which dominates Central Florida, and within the northern extent of the tropical climate typical of South Florida and the Florida Keys.

== Demographics ==
Historical population
Census	Pop.	Note	%±
1970	428		—
1980	593		38.6%
1990	584		−1.5%
2000	604		3.4%
2010	590		−2.3%
2020	613		3.9%
U.S. Decennial Census

=== 2010 and 2020 census ===
St. Lucie Village racial composition (Hispanics excluded from racial categories) (NH = Non-Hispanic)
Race	Pop 2010	Pop 2020	% 2010	% 2020
White (NH)	543	553	92.03%	90.21%
Black or African American (NH)	11	7	1.86%	1.14%
Native American or Alaska Native (NH)	0	1	0.00%	0.16%
Asian (NH)	3	4	0.51%	0.65%
Pacific Islander or Native Hawaiian (NH)	0	0	0.00%	0.00%
Some other race (NH)	0	0	0.00%	0.00%
Two or more races/Multiracial (NH)	6	16	1.02%	2.61%
Hispanic or Latino (any race)	27	32	4.58%	5.22%
Total	590	613		

As of the 2020 United States census, there were 613 people, 276 households, and 195 families residing in the town.

As of the 2010 United States census, there were 590 people, 284 households, and 198 families residing in the town.

=== 2000 census ===
As of the census of 2000, there were 604 people, 278 households, and 170 families residing in the town. The population density was 746.1 inhabitants per square mile (288.1/km^{2}). There were 318 housing units at an average density of 392.8 units per square mile (151.7 units/km^{2}). The racial makeup of the town was 96.85% White, 0.99% African American, 0.17% Native American, 0.83% from other races, and 1.16% from two or more races. Hispanic or Latino of any race were 2.32% of the population.

In 2000, there were 278 households, out of which 23.7% had children under the age of 18 living with them, 50.7% were married couples living together, 6.5% had a female householder with no husband present, and 38.5% were non-families. 32.0% of all households were made up of individuals, and 11.5% had someone living alone who was 65 years of age or older. The average household size was 2.17 and the average family size was 2.68.

In 2000, in the town, the population was spread out, with 18.4% under the age of 18, 5.6% from 18 to 24, 25.5% from 25 to 44, 30.8% from 45 to 64, and 19.7% who were 65 years of age or older. The median age was 45 years. For every 100 females, there were 106.1 males. For every 100 females age 18 and over, there were 108.0 males.

In 2000, the median income for a household in the town was $43,611, and the median income for a family was $51,667. Males had a median income of $31,607 versus $29,250 for females. The per capita income for the town was $25,651. About 1.9% of families and 4.0% of the population were below the poverty line, including 0.8% of those under age 18 and 6.8% of those age 65 or over.
