= Fort Pierce South, Florida =

- CDP
- Location in St. Lucie County and the state of Florida
- Coordinates: 27°24′26″N 80°22′05″W
- Country: United States
- State: Florida
- County: St. Lucie

Area
  - Total: 2.67 sq mi (6.92 km^{2})
  - Land: 2.67 sq mi (6.92 km^{2})
  - Water: 0 sq mi (0.00 km^{2})
- Elevation: 10 ft (3.0 m)

Population (2020)
  - Total: 5,209
  - Density: 1,950.6/sq mi (753.14/km^{2})
- Time zone: UTC-5 (Eastern (EST))
  - Summer (DST): UTC-4 (EDT)
- FIPS code: 12-24387
- GNIS ID: 2402500

Fort Pierce South is a census-designated place (CDP) in St. Lucie County, Florida, United States. As of the 2020 census, Fort Pierce South had a population of 5,209. It is part of the Port St. Lucie Metropolitan Statistical Area.

== Geography ==
According to the United States Census Bureau, the CDP has a total area of 4.5 square miles (12 km^{2}), all land.

== Demographics ==
Historical population
Census	Pop.	Note	%±
2000	5,672		—
2010	5,062		−10.8%
2020	5,209		2.9%
U.S. Decennial Census

=== 2020 census ===
As of the 2020 census, Fort Pierce South had a population of 5,209. The median age was 36.9 years. 24.3% of residents were under the age of 18 and 15.1% of residents were 65 years of age or older. For every 100 females there were 100.8 males, and for every 100 females age 18 and over there were 100.2 males age 18 and over.

100.0% of residents lived in urban areas, while 0.0% lived in rural areas.

There were 1,782 households in Fort Pierce South, of which 35.9% had children under the age of 18 living in them. Of all households, 40.9% were married-couple households, 24.1% were households with a male householder and no spouse or partner present, and 26.0% were households with a female householder and no spouse or partner present. About 23.6% of all households were made up of individuals and 10.1% had someone living alone who was 65 years of age or older.

There were 1,937 housing units, of which 8.0% were vacant. The homeowner vacancy rate was 2.0% and the rental vacancy rate was 6.4%.

Racial composition as of the 2020 census
Race	Number	Percent
White	2,743	52.7%
Black or African American	779	15.0%
American Indian and Alaska Native	45	0.9%
Asian	42	0.8%
Native Hawaiian and Other Pacific Islander	2	0.0%
Some other race	809	15.5%
Two or more races	789	15.1%
Hispanic or Latino (of any race)	1,858	35.7%

=== 2000 census ===
As of the 2000 census, there were 5,672 people, 2,053 households, and 1,478 families residing in the CDP. The population density was 1,259.5 inhabitants per square mile (486.3/km^{2}). There were 2,213 housing units at an average density of 491.4 per square mile (189.7/km^{2}). The racial makeup of the CDP was 77.29% White, 13.13% African American, 0.05% Native American, 1.16% Asian, 0.05% Pacific Islander, 5.73% from other races, and 2.57% from two or more races. Hispanic or Latino of any race were 17.60% of the population.

There were 2,053 households, out of which 35.7% had children under the age of 18 living with them, 51.0% were married couples living together, 14.9% had a female householder with no husband present, and 28.0% were non-families. 20.8% of all households were made up of individuals, and 7.8% had someone living alone who was 65 years of age or older. The average household size was 2.76 and the average family size was 3.17.

In the CDP, the population was spread out, with 27.9% under the age of 18, 10.6% from 18 to 24, 29.0% from 25 to 44, 21.1% from 45 to 64, and 11.4% who were 65 years of age or older. The median age was 33 years. For every 100 females, there were 96.3 males. For every 100 females age 18 and over, there were 97.7 males.

The median income for a household in the CDP was $31,308, and the median income for a family was $35,383. Males had a median income of $26,830 versus $21,810 for females. The per capita income for the CDP was $16,801. About 12.0% of families and 17.6% of the population were below the poverty line, including 26.1% of those under age 18 and 9.7% of those age 65 or over.
