= Lakewood Park, Florida =

- Location in St. Lucie County and the state of Florida
- Coordinates: 27°32′12″N 80°22′40″W
- Country: United States
- State: Florida
- County: St. Lucie

Area
  - Total: 6.89 sq mi (17.85 km^{2})
  - Land: 6.64 sq mi (17.21 km^{2})
  - Water: 0.25 sq mi (0.64 km^{2})
- Elevation: 16 ft (4.9 m)

Population (2020)
  - Total: 12,510
  - Density: 1,882.2/sq mi (726.71/km^{2})
- Time zone: UTC-5 (Eastern (EST))
  - Summer (DST): UTC-4 (EDT)
- FIPS code: 12-39062
- GNIS feature ID: 2403216

Lakewood Park is a Census-designated place in St. Lucie County, Florida, United States. As of the 2020 census, Lakewood Park had a population of 12,510. It is part of the Port St. Lucie Metropolitan Statistical Area.

== Geography ==
According to the United States Census Bureau, the CDP has a total area of 6.9 square miles (18 km^{2}), of which 6.7 square miles (17 km^{2}) is land and 0.2 square miles (0.52 km^{2}) (3.18%) is water.

== Demographics ==
Historical population
Census	Pop.	Note	%±
2000	10,458		—
2010	11,323		8.3%
2020	12,510		10.5%
U.S. Decennial Census

=== 2020 census ===
As of the 2020 census, Lakewood Park had a population of 12,510. The median age was 50.2 years. 17.8% of residents were under the age of 18 and 27.7% of residents were 65 years of age or older. For every 100 females there were 94.9 males, and for every 100 females age 18 and over there were 93.8 males age 18 and over.

98.4% of residents lived in urban areas, while 1.6% lived in rural areas.

There were 5,410 households in Lakewood Park, of which 22.3% had children under the age of 18 living in them. Of all households, 46.2% were married-couple households, 18.9% were households with a male householder and no spouse or partner present, and 26.4% were households with a female householder and no spouse or partner present. About 28.2% of all households were made up of individuals and 16.4% had someone living alone who was 65 years of age or older.

There were 6,049 housing units, of which 10.6% were vacant. The homeowner vacancy rate was 2.4% and the rental vacancy rate was 8.3%.

Racial composition as of the 2020 census
Race	Number	Percent
White	9,213	73.6%
Black or African American	1,483	11.9%
American Indian and Alaska Native	49	0.4%
Asian	165	1.3%
Native Hawaiian and Other Pacific Islander	15	0.1%
Some other race	434	3.5%
Two or more races	1,151	9.2%
Hispanic or Latino (of any race)	1,356	10.8%

=== 2000 census ===
As of the 2000 census, there were 10,458 people, 4,562 households, and 3,166 families residing in the CDP. The population density was 1,561.6 inhabitants per square mile (602.9/km^{2}). There were 5,124 housing units at an average density of 765.1 per square mile (295.4/km^{2}). The racial makeup of the CDP was 91.81% White, 5.28% African American, 0.36% Native American, 0.62% Asian, 0.06% Pacific Islander, 0.67% from other races, and 1.20% from two or more races. Hispanic or Latino of any race were 2.54% of the population.

There were 4,562 households, out of which 22.8% had children under the age of 18 living with them, 58.2% were married couples living together, 7.7% had a female householder with no husband present, and 30.6% were non-families. 25.9% of all households were made up of individuals, and 15.7% had someone living alone who was 65 years of age or older. The average household size was 2.29 and the average family size was 2.71.

In the CDP, the population was spread out, with 19.8% under the age of 18, 5.5% from 18 to 24, 23.6% from 25 to 44, 21.6% from 45 to 64, and 29.6% who were 65 years of age or older. The median age was 46 years. For every 100 females, there were 94.6 males. For every 100 females age 18 and over, there were 90.9 males.

The median income for a household in the CDP was $35,805, and the median income for a family was $41,069. Males had a median income of $30,271 versus $22,872 for females. The per capita income for the CDP was $19,041. About 8.2% of families and 9.5% of the population were below the poverty line, including 14.1% of those under age 18 and 5.6% of those age 65 or over.
