= Fort Pierce North, Florida =

- CDP
- Location in St. Lucie County and the state of Florida
- Coordinates: 27°29′17″N 80°21′34″W
- Country: United States
- State: Florida
- County: St. Lucie

Area
  - Total: 4.32 sq mi (11.18 km^{2})
  - Land: 4.24 sq mi (10.98 km^{2})
  - Water: 0.077 sq mi (0.20 km^{2})
- Elevation: 20 ft (6.1 m)

Population (2020)
  - Total: 6,904
  - Density: 1,628.3/sq mi (628.69/km^{2})
- Time zone: UTC-5 (Eastern (EST))
  - Summer (DST): UTC-4 (EDT)
- FIPS code: 12-24337
- GNIS ID: 2402499

Fort Pierce North is a census-designated place (CDP) in St. Lucie County, Florida, United States. Per the 2020 census, the population was 6,904. It is part of the Port St. Lucie Metropolitan Statistical Area.

== Geography ==
According to the United States Census Bureau, the CDP has a total area of 4.6 square miles (12 km^{2}), of which 4.5 square miles (12 km^{2}) is land and 0.1 square miles (0.26 km^{2}) (1.97%) is water.

== Demographics ==
Historical population
Census	Pop.	Note	%±
1960	1,417		—
1970	3,269		130.7%
1980	5,929		81.4%
1990	5,833		−1.6%
2000	7,386		26.6%
2010	6,474		−12.3%
2020	6,904		6.6%
U.S. Decennial Census; 2010 2020

=== Racial and ethnic composition ===
Fort Pierce North CDP, Florida – Racial and ethnic composition Note: the US Census treats Hispanic/Latino as an ethnic category. This table excludes Latinos from the racial categories and assigns them to a separate category. Hispanics/Latinos may be of any race.
Race / Ethnicity (NH = Non-Hispanic)	Pop 2000	Pop 2010	Pop 2020	% 2000	% 2010	% 2020
White alone (NH)	1,540	1,135	1,119	20.85%	17.53%	16.21%
Black or African American alone (NH)	5,306	4,504	4,474	71.84%	69.57%	64.80%
Native American or Alaska Native alone (NH)	16	19	15	0.22%	0.29%	0.22%
Asian alone (NH)	5	6	16	0.07%	0.09%	0.23%
Native Hawaiian or Pacific Islander alone (NH)	2	4	1	0.03%	0.06%	0.01%
Other race alone (NH)	10	4	14	0.14%	0.06%	0.20%
Mixed race or Multiracial (NH)	101	82	163	1.37%	1.27%	2.36%
Hispanic or Latino (any race)	406	720	1,102	5.50%	11.12%	15.96%
Total	7,386	6,474	6,904	100.00%	100.00%	100.00%

=== 2020 census ===
As of the 2020 census, Fort Pierce North had a population of 6,904. The median age was 37.6 years. 25.9% of residents were under the age of 18 and 17.7% of residents were 65 years of age or older. For every 100 females there were 93.5 males, and for every 100 females age 18 and over there were 88.0 males age 18 and over.

98.6% of residents lived in urban areas, while 1.4% lived in rural areas.

There were 2,392 households in Fort Pierce North, of which 33.5% had children under the age of 18 living in them. Of all households, 32.2% were married-couple households, 20.4% were households with a male householder and no spouse or partner present, and 38.8% were households with a female householder and no spouse or partner present. About 25.4% of all households were made up of individuals and 12.9% had someone living alone who was 65 years of age or older.

There were 2,800 housing units, of which 14.6% were vacant. The homeowner vacancy rate was 1.8% and the rental vacancy rate was 8.6%.

=== 2010 Census ===
As of the census of 2010, there were 6,474 people, 2,552 households, and 1,862 families residing in the CDP. The population density was 1,652.4 inhabitants per square mile (638.0/km^{2}). There were 3,087 housing units at an average density of 690.6 per square mile (266.6/km^{2}). The racial makeup of the CDP was 23.25% White, 72.35% African American, 0.26% Native American, 0.07% Asian, 0.15% Pacific Islander, 2.04% from other races, and 1.88% from two or more races. Hispanic or Latino of any race were 5.50% of the population.

There were 2,552 households, out of which 31.3% had children under the age of 18 living with them, 44.4% were married couples living together, 23.3% had a female householder with no husband present, and 27.0% were non-families. 22.0% of all households were made up of individuals, and 9.6% had someone living alone who was 65 years of age or older. The average household size was 2.89 and the average family size was 3.35.

In the CDP, the population was spread out, with 29.9% under the age of 18, 8.9% from 18 to 24, 23.9% from 25 to 44, 24.6% from 45 to 64, and 12.7% who were 65 years of age or older. The median age was 35 years. For every 100 females, there were 92.3 males. For every 100 females age 18 and over, there were 85.9 males.

The median income for a household in the CDP was $25,899, and the median income for a family was $29,375. Males had a median income of $24,688 versus $21,117 for females. The per capita income for the CDP was $11,344. About 19.0% of families and 22.1% of the population were below the poverty line, including 26.1% of those under age 18 and 12.0% of those age 65 or over.
