= Treasure Coast International Airport =

Airport in Florida, U.S.

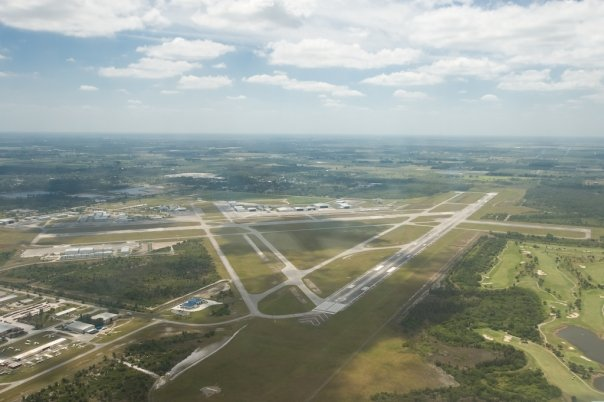
- KFPR, December 1, 2009
- IATA: FPR; ICAO: KFPR; FAA LID: FPR

Summary
- Airport type: International
- Owner: St. Lucie Board of County Commissioners
- Location: Fort Pierce, Florida
- Elevation AMSL: 23 ft (7.0 m)
- Coordinates: 27°29′42″N 080°22′06″W
- Website: Website

Maps
- FAA airport diagram
- Interactive map of Treasure Coast International Airport

Runways
Direction	Length		Surface
Direction	ft	m	Surface
10R/28L	6,492	1,979	Asphalt
14/32	4,755	1,449	Asphalt
10L/28R	4,000	1,219	Asphalt

Statistics (2017)
- Aircraft operations: avg 537/Day
- Based aircraft: 207
- Source: Federal Aviation Administration

Treasure Coast International Airport (IATA: FPR, ICAO: KFPR, FAA LID: FPR) is a public airport located three miles (5 km) northwest of the central business district of Fort Pierce, a city in St. Lucie County, Florida, United States. It is owned by the St. Lucie Board of County Commissioners.

The airport sees frequent use by various aviation flight schools in south Florida, including three based at the airport, for general aviation flight training traffic. The airport also hosts a Federal Inspection Station (FIS) administered by United States Customs & Border Protection, which makes it a frequent stop for private aircraft coming in and out of the Bahama Islands.

DayJet provided an on-demand jet air taxi service from this airport before suspending operation in September 2008.

== History ==
The history of the airport dates back to 1921, when the Commercial Club of Fort Pierce built an airport where the local American Legion building now stands on U.S. Route 1 for an airline that never got off the ground. Nine years later, the county purchased 1,600 acres (6.5 km^{2}) of land that eventually became the current airport; however, the first commercial airport was dedicated in 1935 in an area in the vicinity of U.S. Route 1 and Edwards Road.

The current airport, originally named Fort Pierce Airport, was leased during World War II by the U.S. Navy as an auxiliary field for pilots and flight crews from Naval Air Station Vero Beach, Naval Air Station Melbourne and Naval Air Station Fort Lauderdale for conducting daytime and nighttime field carrier landing practice (FCLP) prior to landing on actual aircraft carriers. Scout aircraft, dive bombers and torpedo attack bombers used the runways, which were redesigned by the military to better accommodate naval aviation training requirements. In 1947, the Navy disestablished operations and the U.S. Government conveyed the airport back to the county, to include two newly constructed runways, without charging for the improvements made.

With little financial capital in county government to operate and maintain a modern airport, the facility languished for the next ten years, becoming overgrown with vegetation and subject to frequent grazing by cattle from nearby farms and ranches. During the 1960s and 1970s, major improvements took off with the construction of an airport terminal, modern hangars, airfield lighting, navigational aids and fuel facilities. Curtis King, who became the first full-time director in 1967, played an instrumental role in the development of the county's airport for 31 years.

The airport's name had become St. Lucie County Airport, but in 1980 this was changed to St Lucie County International Airport.

Fort Pierce briefly saw commercial airline service in 1988 when Delta Connection, operated by Comair on behalf of Delta Air Lines provided flights to Orlando and Fort Lauderdale using Embraer EMB 110 Bandeirante commuter aircraft.

The airport continued to evolve as a general aviation facility, and even though two of four runways were decommissioned, one such former runway became the site of the Airport West Commerce Park, while Runway 9R/27L (later renamed 10R/28L) was lengthened and improved.

Runway 10L/28R was completed in early 2010, costing $15.3 million. The recent completion of a north–south connector taxiway between training runway 10L/28R and runway 10R/28L reduced the need for training aircraft to use one of the primary runways for takeoffs and landings at the beginning and/or end of training flights, respectively.

Around 2017 the airport's name was changed again, this time to Treasure Coast International Airport.

== Facilities and aircraft ==
Treasure Coast International Airport covers an area of 3,844 acres (1,556 ha) which contains three asphalt paved runways: 10R/28L measuring 6,492 x 150 ft (1,979 x 46 m), 10L/28R measuring 4,000 x 75 ft (1,219 x 23 m) and 14/32 measuring 4,755 x 100 ft (1,449 x 30 m).

For the 12-month period ending January 2, 2018, the airport had 196,000 general aviation aircraft operations, an average of 537 per day. There were at that time 207 aircraft based at this airport: 145 single-engine, 39 multi-engine, 7 jet, 15 helicopter and 1 glider. At that time 53% of movements were local general aviation and 47% were transient general aviation.

== Accidents and incidents ==
- On September 11, 2000, at 1246 eastern daylight time, a PA-28-161 (Cherokee), N9208N, and a PA-23-250 (Aztec), N54235, collided on final approach to land on runway 09 at the Saint Lucie International Airport in Fort Pierce, Florida.
- On 25 September 2003, a Grumman HU-16 Albatross of Corsair Aviation Holdings Inc. crashed 5 km NW of FPR after takeoff because of the pilot placing the fuel selector in the off position resulting in fuel starvation to the left engine after the pilot intentionally shut down the right engine. Two out of the three occupants died.
- On 5 November 2009, Grumman Albatross N120FB of Albatross Adventures crashed when an engine failed shortly after take-off. The aircraft was damaged beyond economic repair.
- On 4 April 2012, a twin Cessna made a gear-up landing, after a landing gear failure. The aircraft came to rest on runway 32 and was lifted off by a crane later the same day.
- On 27 December 2023, a Beechcraft E90 King Air made a gear-up landing, after a landing gear failure. The aircraft had an original destination of Leonard M. Thompson International Airport, but decided to divert to Treasure Coast after learning of the gear issue. The aircraft landed on runway 28L and no injures were reported.

== See also ==
- List of airports in Florida
