= Senator Beall =

Senator Beall may refer to:

== Members of the United States Senate ==
- J. Glenn Beall Jr. (1927–2006), U.S. Senator from Maryland from 1971 to 1977
- James Glenn Beall (1894–1971), U.S. Senator from Maryland from 1953 to 1965

== United States state senate members ==
- Daryl Beall (born 1946), Iowa State Senate
- Edmond Beall (1848–1920), Illinois State Senate
- Jim Beall (California politician) (born 1951), California State Senate
- Philip D. Beall Jr. (1915–1988), Florida State Senate
- Philip D. Beall Sr. (1891–1943), Florida State Senate

== See also ==
- Richard L. T. Beale (1819–1893), Virginia State Senate
- Senator Ball (disambiguation)
- Senator Bell (disambiguation)
