= Indian River Boulevard (Indian River County, Florida) =

County road in Indian River County, Florida

County Road 603

Route information
- Length: 6.5 mi (10.5 km)
- Existed: 1987–present

Major junctions
- South end: US 1 in Vero Beach South
- SR 60 in Vero Beach; SR 656 in Vero Beach
- North end: US 1 in Gifford

Location
- Country: United States
- State: Florida
- County: Indian River

Highway system
- County roads in Florida; County roads in Indian River County
← CR 512	→ CR 605

Indian River Boulevard, or County Road 603 (CR 603) is a major 6.5 mile county road that runs parallel to US Highway 1 (US 1) in Indian River County, Florida. Indian River Boulevard connects US 1 in Vero Beach South near McKee Botanical Gardens with the Alma Lee Loy Bridge and Merrill P. Barber Bridge.

State Road 60 (SR 60) runs concurrently with CR 603 in Vero Beach. The road was built in 1987.

== Route description ==
The road begins in Vero Beach South at the intersection with US 1. The road heads north, intersecting with CR 612 (8th Street). In Vero Beach, Indian River Boulevard intersects SR 656, with access to the Alma Lee Loy Bridge. The intersection is the site of the "Three Corners" project of Vero Beach. At the intersection with SR 60, CR 603 and SR 60 begin running concurrently. Shopping is provided at the Miracle Mile neighborhood nearby. SR 60 provides access to downtown Vero Beach. SR 60 exits CR 603 near Royal Palm Point at the Merrill P. Barber Bridge, where construction is underway. Indian River Boulevard intersects with 37th street in Vero Beach, providing access to Cleveland Clinic Indian River Hospital and surrounding medical facilities.

In Gifford, the road intersects CR 630 (41st Street), which connects to the Vero Beach Regional Airport. CR 630 provides access to the Indian River County Jail as well. A housing development with a recreational area is under construction at the intersection. CR 603 ends on US-1 in Gifford and continues locally as 53rd street.

== Major intersections ==
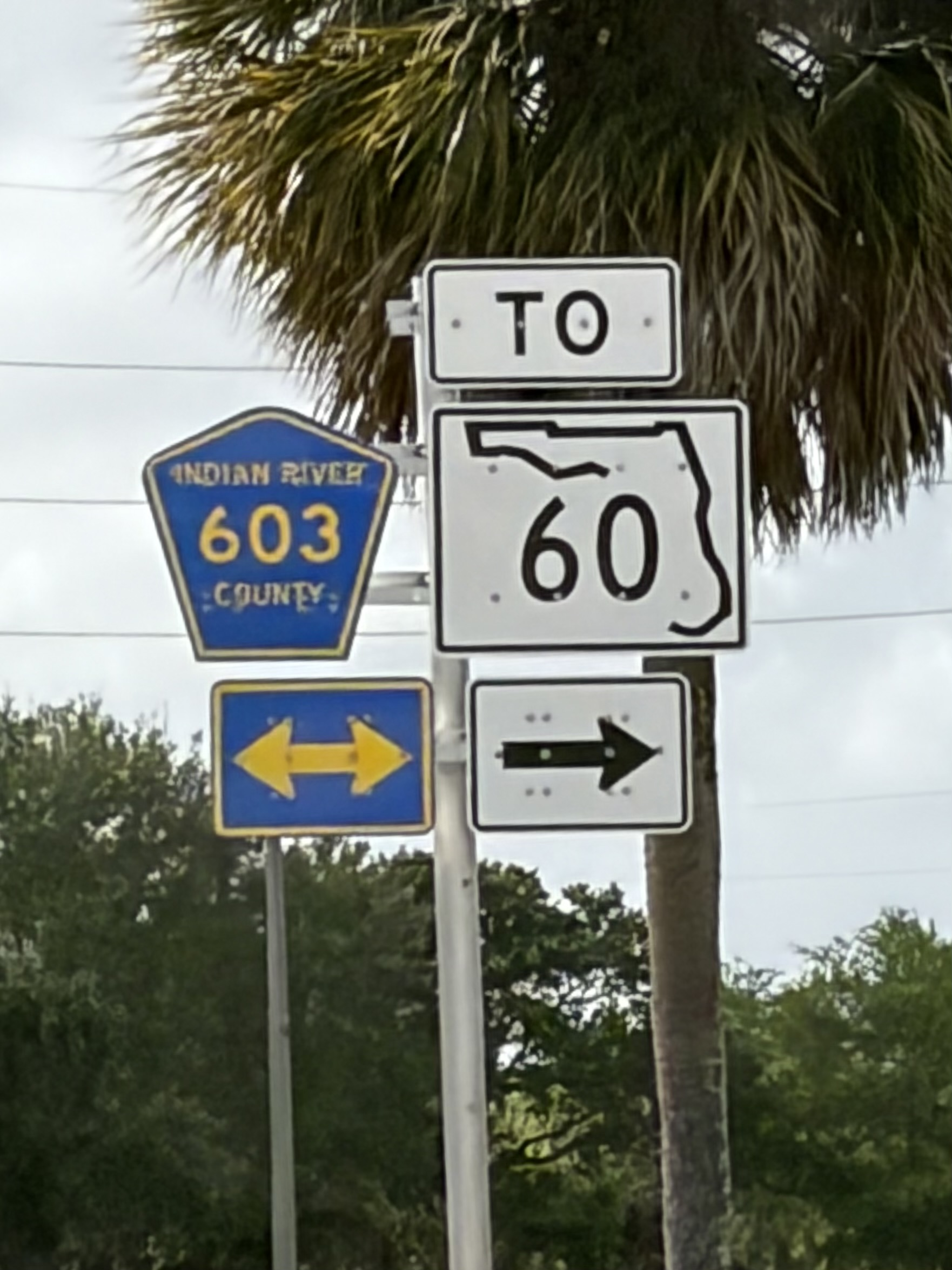
CR-603 marker seen from SR-656

The entire route is in Indian River County.

Location	mi	km	Destinations	Notes
Vero Beach South	0.00	0.00	US 1 (SR 5) – McKee Botanical Gardens	Southern terminus
Vero Beach South	0.58	0.93	CR 612 west (8th Street)	Eastern terminus of CR 612
Vero Beach	1.77	2.85	SR 656 (17th Street) to SR A1A / US 1 – Beaches	Alma Lee Loy Bridge
Vero Beach	2.13	3.43	SR 60 west (20th Street) to I-95 / US 1 – Vero Beach Regional Airport, Historic Downtown Vero Beach	Southern end of SR 60 concurrency
Vero Beach	2.73	4.39	Royal Palm Boulevard / Royal Palm Place / Royal Palm Pointe to Royal Palm Pointe Business District	
Vero Beach	3.12	5.02	SR 60 east (Beachland Boulevard) to SR A1A – Vero Beach Museum of Art, Riverside Theatre	Northern end of SR 60 concurrency; Merrill P. Barber Bridge
Vero Beach	3.74	6.02	37th Street - Cleveland Clinic Indian River Hospital	Access to Cleveland Clinic Indian River Hospital
Gifford	4.45	7.16	CR 630 west (41st Street)	Unsigned S Gifford Road
Gifford	6.57	10.57	US 1 / CR 5A (Old Dixie Highway)	Northern terminus; continues west as 53rd Street without designation
1.000 mi = 1.609 km; 1.000 km = 0.621 mi: Concurrency terminus
