= Senator Melvin =

Senator Melvin may refer to:

- Al Melvin (politician) (born 1944), Arizona State Senate
- Woodrow M. Melvin (1912–1994), Florida State Senate
