= Pork Chop Gang =

Group of North Floridian Democratic legislators

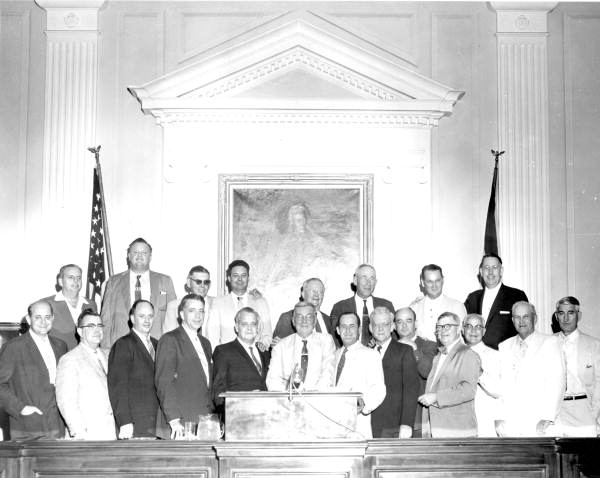
Pork Chop Gang, 1956.

The Pork Chop Gang was a group of twenty Democratic Party legislators from rural areas of North Florida who worked together to dominate the Florida legislature, especially to maintain segregation and conserve the disproportionate political power of mostly rural northern Florida. The origins of the name are obscure, referring either to a purported divide in the state's cuisine (pork supposedly being preferred in the north and lamb being preferred in the south) or to the legislative pork that the members of the Gang were allegedly awarding themselves. They were active primarily from the 1930s to the 1960s, although the final "nail in their coffin" was in 1977. The spokesman was Senator Charley Johns.

They "had become unusually powerful in the 1950s because the legislative districts of the state had not been redrawn to account for the massive growth of urban areas in earlier years." The key figure in the group, coordinating their activities, although not a legislator, was industrialist Ed Ball. Legislator Howell Lancaster was a leader of the group. Their favorite haunt was the fish camp of legislator Raeburn C. Horne, at Nutall Rise, in Taylor County on the Aucilla River. The group targeted communists and homosexuals.

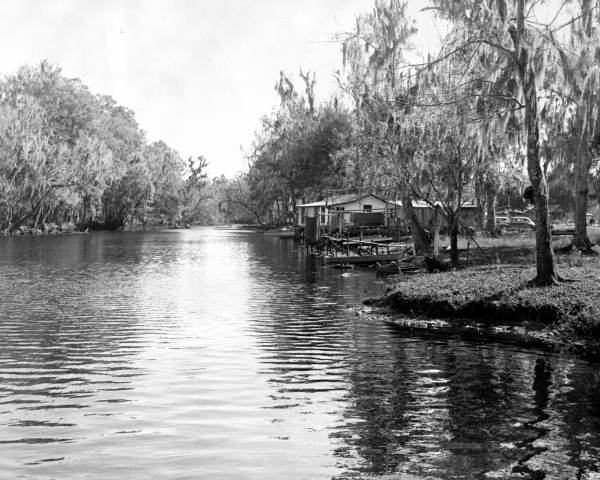
Photograph of the Aucilla River at Nutall Rise by Raeburn C. Horne's fish camp

In a 2014 article, Professor Judith Poucher called the Johns Committee "Florida's version of McCarthyism".

== Membership ==
The following legislators were members of the Pork Chop Gang in 1956, according to the captions on a photo of them in the state archives of Florida:

Members of the Pork Chop Gang in 1956
Legislator	Hometown
James E. "Nick" Connor	Brooksville
L. K. Edwards Jr.	Irvine
Irlo Bronson Sr.	Kissimmee
W. E. Bishop	Lake City
H. B. Douglas	Bonifay
William A. Shands	Gainesville
W. Randolph Hodges	Cedar Key
Charley Eugene Johns	Starke
John S. Rawls	Marianna
Philip D. Beall Jr.	Pensacola
Harry Stratton	Callahan
F. Wilson Carraway	Tallahassee
W. Turner Davis	Madison
Scott Dilworth Clarke	Monticello
Dewey M. Johnson	Quincy
J. Edwin Baker	Umatilla
Edwin Fraser	Macclenny
Bill Pearce	East Palatka
Woodrow M. Melvin	Milton
J. Graham Black	Jasper
J. C. Getzen	Bushnell

== Activities ==
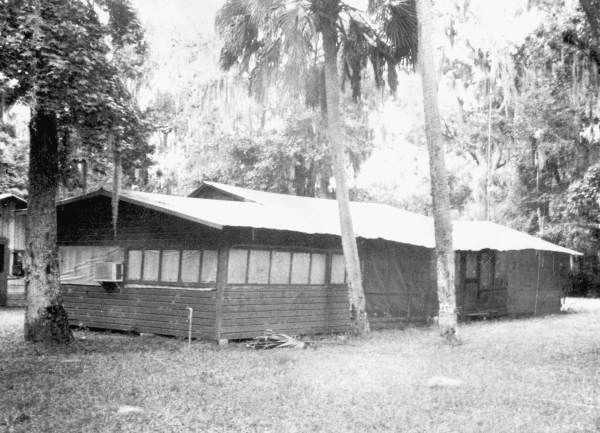
The Raeburn C. Horne fish camp (1960s)

For nine years, the Pork Chop Gang, having failed in its investigation of alleged communism in the NAACP, devoted its efforts to identifying homosexuals in Florida universities and schools. "By 1963, more than 39 college professors and deans had been dismissed from their positions at the three state universities, and 71 teaching certificates were revoked." In January 1964, the Florida Legislative Investigation Committee (FLIC) of the Florida Legislature, led by state senator Charley Eugene Johns published the anti-gay propaganda pamphlet Homosexuality and Citizenship in Florida, also known as the Purple Pamphlet. It was sold for 25 cents a copy, with a discount for bulk orders of 100 copies or more.

The downfall of the Pork Chop Gang was U. S. Supreme Court ruling in Reynolds v. Sims (1964), which required all states to apportion their state senate seats on the basis of equal population. The revised Florida Constitution of 1968, ended decades of malapportionment that favored rural north Florida over more populated central and south Florida, and eliminated mandatory school segregation.

== See also ==
- Mississippi State Sovereignty Commission
