= Senator Bishop =

Senator Bishop may refer to:

- Charles Bishop (Alabama politician) (fl. 1980s–2010s), Alabama State Senate
- Charles Pleasant Bishop (1854–1941), Oregon State Senate
- Click Bishop (born 1957), Alaska State Senate
- Dan Bishop (born 1964), North Carolina State Senate
- Isaac T. Bishop (1844–1920), Wisconsin State Senate
- Isaac W. Bishop (c. 1804–?), New York State Senate
- Mark Bishop (born 1954), Australian State Senate
- Mike Bishop (Michigan politician) (born 1967), Michigan State Senate
- Neil S. Bishop (1903–1989), Maine State Senate
- Phanuel Bishop (1739–1812), Massachusetts State Senate
- Robert R. Bishop (1834–1910), Massachusetts State Senate
- Sanford Bishop (born 1947), Georgia State Senate
- W. E. Bishop (1915–1990), Florida State Senate
- Wesley T. Bishop (fl. 2010s), Louisiana State Senate
- William D. Bishop (1827–1904), Connecticut State Senate
- William S. Bishop (1800s–1863), New York State Senate
