= Senator Stratton =

Senator Stratton may refer to:

- Harry Stratton (1910–1972), Florida State Senate
- Juliana Stratton (born 1965), U.S. Senator-elect from Illinois
- Keven Stratton (fl. 2010s–present), Utah State Senate
- Lois Stratton (1927–2020), Washington State Senate
