= Senator Douglas =

Senator Douglas may refer to:

== Members of the United States Senate ==
- Paul Douglas (1892–1976), U.S. Senator from Illinois from 1949 to 1967
- Stephen A. Douglas (1813–1861), U.S. Senator from Illinois from 1847 to 1861

== United States state senate members ==
- Beverly B. Douglas (1822–1878), Virginia State Senate
- Curtis N. Douglas (1856–1919), New York State Senate
- H. B. Douglas (1888–1971), Florida State Senate
- James Postell Douglas (1836–1901), Texas State Senate
- Mark Douglas (politician) (1829–1900), Wisconsin State Senate
- William Lewis Douglas (1845–1924), Massachusetts State Senate

== See also ==
- Brooks Douglass (born 1963), Oklahoma State Senate
- Neria Douglass (born 1952), Maine State Senate
