= Merrill P. Barber =

American politician

Member of the Florida Senate from the 12th District
- In office 1954–1958
- Preceded by: Evans Crary
- Succeeded by: Harry J. Kicliter

Member of the Florida Senate from the 29th District
- In office 1963–1968
- Preceded by: Edwin Fraser
- Succeeded by: Beth Johnson

8th Mayor of Vero Beach, Florida
- In office December 10, 1947 – December 14, 1949
- Preceded by: Alexander MacWilliam, Sr.
- Succeeded by: Alexander MacWilliam, Sr.

Personal details
- Born: December 18, 1910 Marshall, Missouri
- Died: December 21, 1985 (aged 75) Indian River County, Florida
- Party: Democratic
- Spouse: Helen Clarkson Barber (m. March 9, 1931)
- Children: Helen C. Barber Stabile, Carolyn E. Barber

Merrill P. Barber (December 18, 1910 – December 21, 1985) was the mayor of Vero Beach, Florida from December 10, 1947, to December 14, 1949. He was a member of the Florida Senate from the 12th District from 1954 to 1958 and from the 29th District from 1963 to 1968.

He was born in Marshall, Missouri in 1911 and was the son of Merrill J Barber and Lelia E Barber. He came with his family to Vero Beach in 1913 at the age of three.

He was President of the Indian River County Citrus Bank.

== Legacy ==
- The Merrill P. Barber Bridge is named for him.

Preceded by Alexander MacWilliam, Sr.	Mayor of Vero Beach, Florida; December 10, 1947–December 14, 1949	Succeeded by Alexander MacWilliam, Sr.
Preceded by Evans Crary	Member of the Florida Senate from the 12th District; 1954–1958	Succeeded by Harry J. Kicliter
Preceded by Edwin Fraser	Member of the Florida Senate from the 29th District; 1963–1968	Succeeded by Elizabeth J. Johnson
