= S. D. Clarke =

American politician

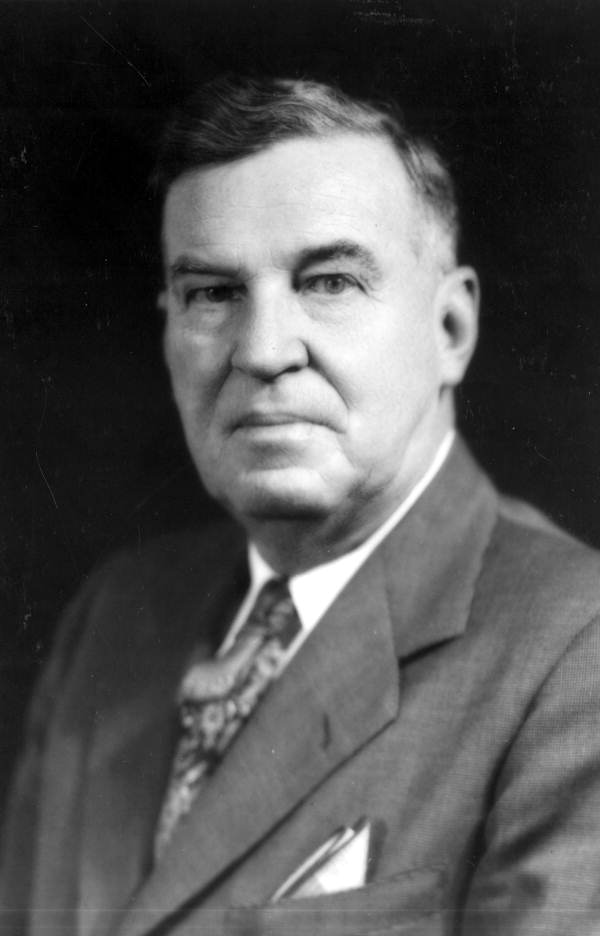

Member of the Florida Senate
- In office 1931–1965

Personal details
- Born: Scott Dilworth Clarke; March 31, 1881 Monticello, Florida, U.S.
- Died: December 28, 1966 (aged 85) Monticello, Florida, U.S.
- Party: Democratic
- Spouse: Carrie Bailey
- Children: two
- Education: University of Virginia; South Florida Military Academy
- Occupation: attorney and bank president

Scott Dilworth "Dill" Clarke (March 31, 1881 – December 28, 1966) was an American politician in the state of Florida. A Democrat, he served in the Florida Senate including as its president.

Clarke was born in Monticello, Florida in 1881, to Thomas L. and Daisy (Bird) Clarke and was educated at South Florida Military College and the University of Virginia after he attended local schools in his hometown. He was an attorney and bank president. Clarke served in the Florida State Senate from 1931 to 1965 as a Democratic member for the 31st district. In 1947, he was President of the Florida Senate. He was a member of the Pork Chop Gang, a group of legislators from rural areas that dominated the state legislature due to malapportionment and used their power to engage in McCarthyist tactics.
