= Harry J. Kicliter =

American politician

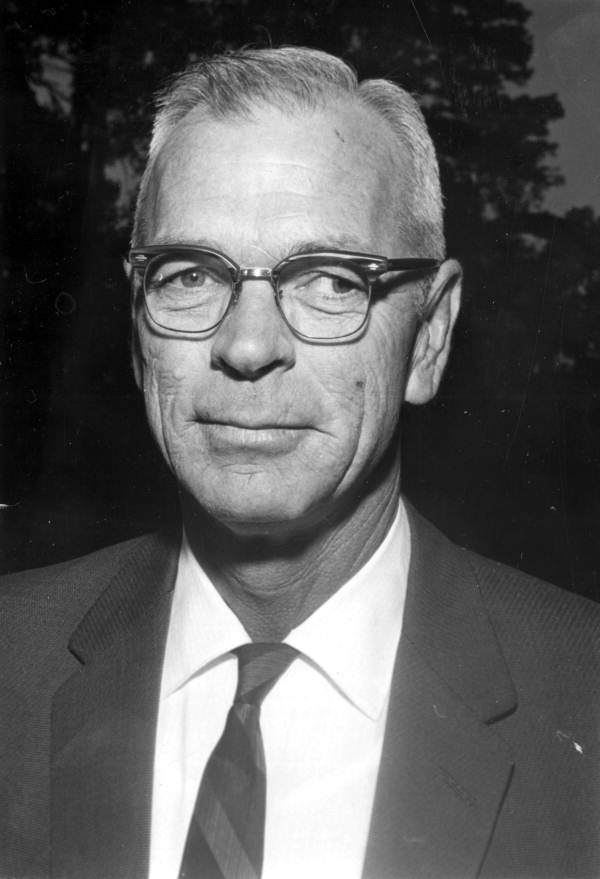
- Kicliter in 1961

Member of the Florida Senate from the 12th district
- In office 1959–1962
- Preceded by: Merrill P. Barber
- Succeeded by: John M. McCarty

Personal details
- Born: May 1, 1914
- Died: December 19, 1969 (aged 55)
- Party: Democratic

Harry J. Kicliter (May 1, 1914 – December 19, 1969) was an American politician. He served as a Democratic member for the 12th district of the Florida Senate.

== Life and career ==
Kicliter was a St. Lucie County commissioner.

Kicliter served in the Florida Senate from 1959 to 1962, representing the 12th district.

Kicliter died on December 19, 1969, at the age of 55.
