= J. Wofford Lindler =

American politician

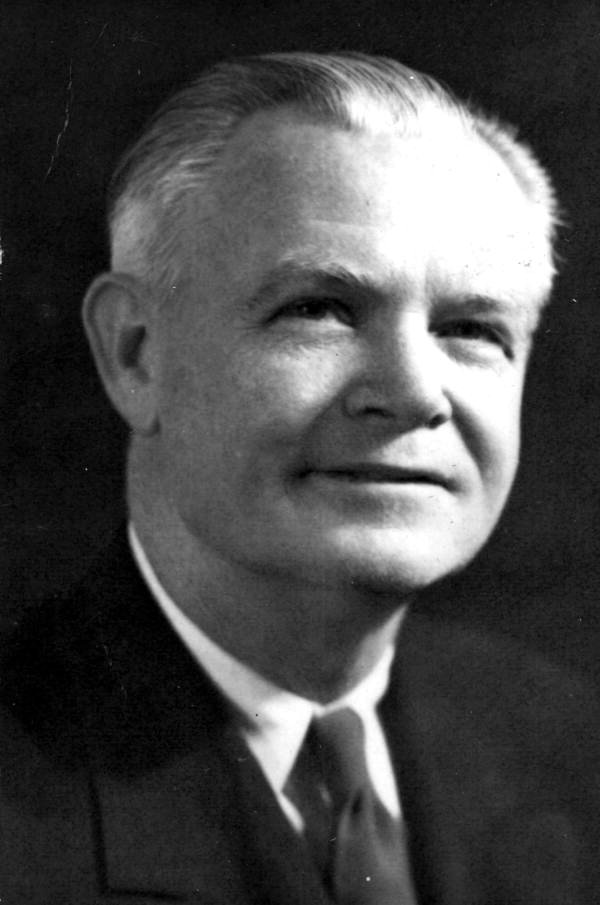
- Lindler in 1947

Member of the Florida House of Representatives from Columbia County
- In office 1931

Member of the Florida Senate from the 14th district
- In office 1939–1953
- Preceded by: Samuel C. Smith
- Succeeded by: J. O. Phillips

Personal details
- Born: August 20, 1897
- Died: June 24, 1954 (aged 56)
- Party: Democratic

J. Wofford Lindler (August 20, 1897 – June 24, 1954), also known as James Wofford Lindler, was an American politician. He served as a Democratic member of the Florida House of Representatives. He also served as a member for the 14th district of the Florida Senate.
