= John S. Rawls =

American politician

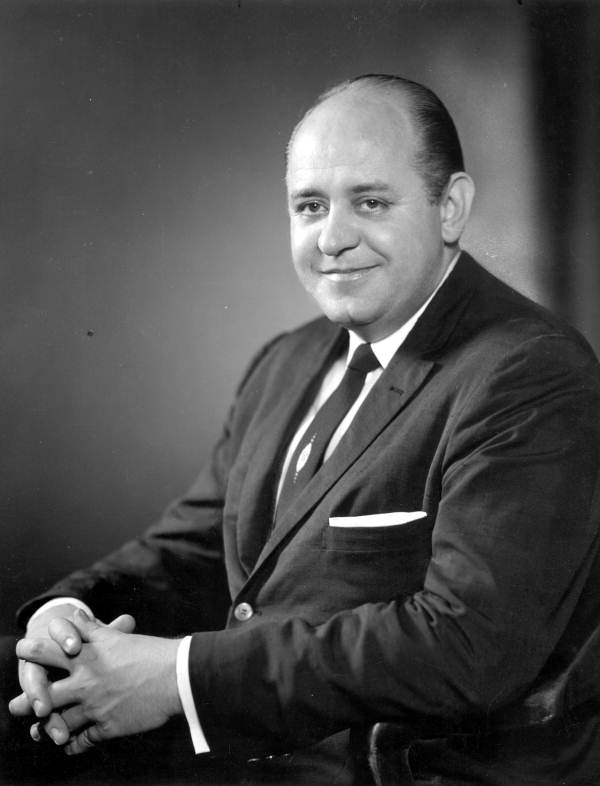

Member of the Florida Senate
- In office 1955–1961

Personal details
- Born: John Samuel Rawls; January 1, 1921 Florida, U.S.
- Died: May 11, 1993 (aged 72) Leon County, Florida, U.S.
- Party: Democratic
- Education: University of Florida
- Occupation: lawyer

John Samuel Rawls (January 1, 1921 – May 11, 1993) was an American politician in the state of Florida. He served in the Florida State Senate from 1955 to 1961 as a Democratic member for the 4th district. He was a member of the Pork Chop Gang, a group of legislators from rural areas that dominated the state legislature due to malapportionment and used their power to engage in McCarthyist tactics.
