= Merrill P. Barber Bridge =

Concrete bridge in Florida, United States

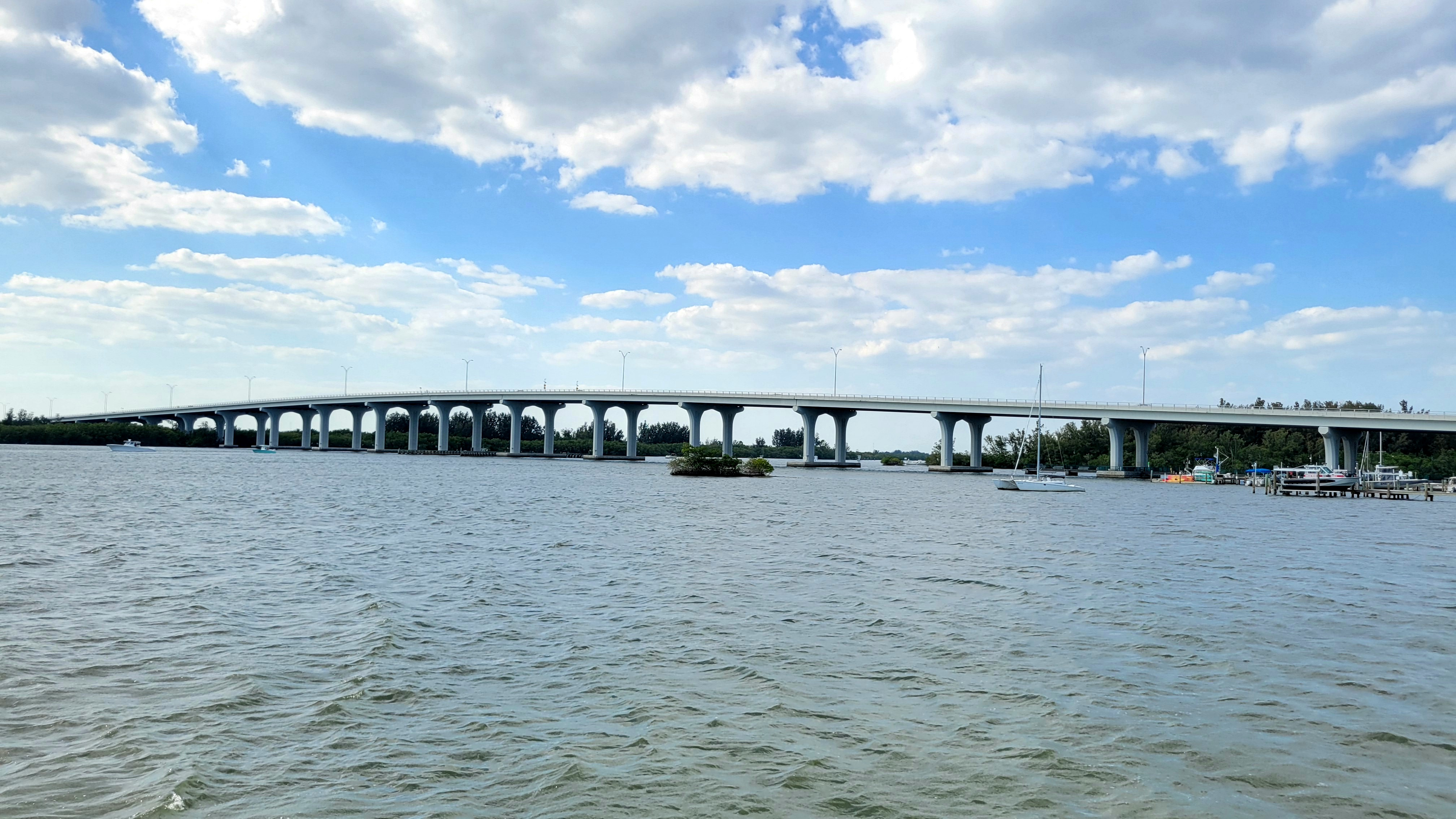
- Coordinates: 27.65293°N 80.37329°W
- Carries: SR 60
- Crosses: Indian River Lagoon
- Locale: Indian River County, Florida

Characteristics
- Design: concrete deck arch
- Total length: 3,834 feet (1,169 m)
- Width: 49 feet (15 m) each side

History
- Opened: 1951 (original bridge); 1995 (current bridge)

Location
- Interactive map of Merrill P. Barber Bridge

The Merrill P. Barber Bridge is a concrete arch bridge that spans the Indian River Intracoastal Waterway in Indian River County, Florida. The bridge was completed in 1995. A fishing pier is constructed below the bridge on the east side.

The bridge is named for Merrill P. Barber, the mayor of Vero Beach from 1947 to 1949, and member of the Florida Senate from the 12th District from 1954 to 1958 and from the 29th District from 1963 to 1968. The bridge has a total length of 3,834 feet (1,169 m) with a main span of 100 feet (30 m). The vertical clearance is 65 ft. The Florida Department of Transportation number is 880087.

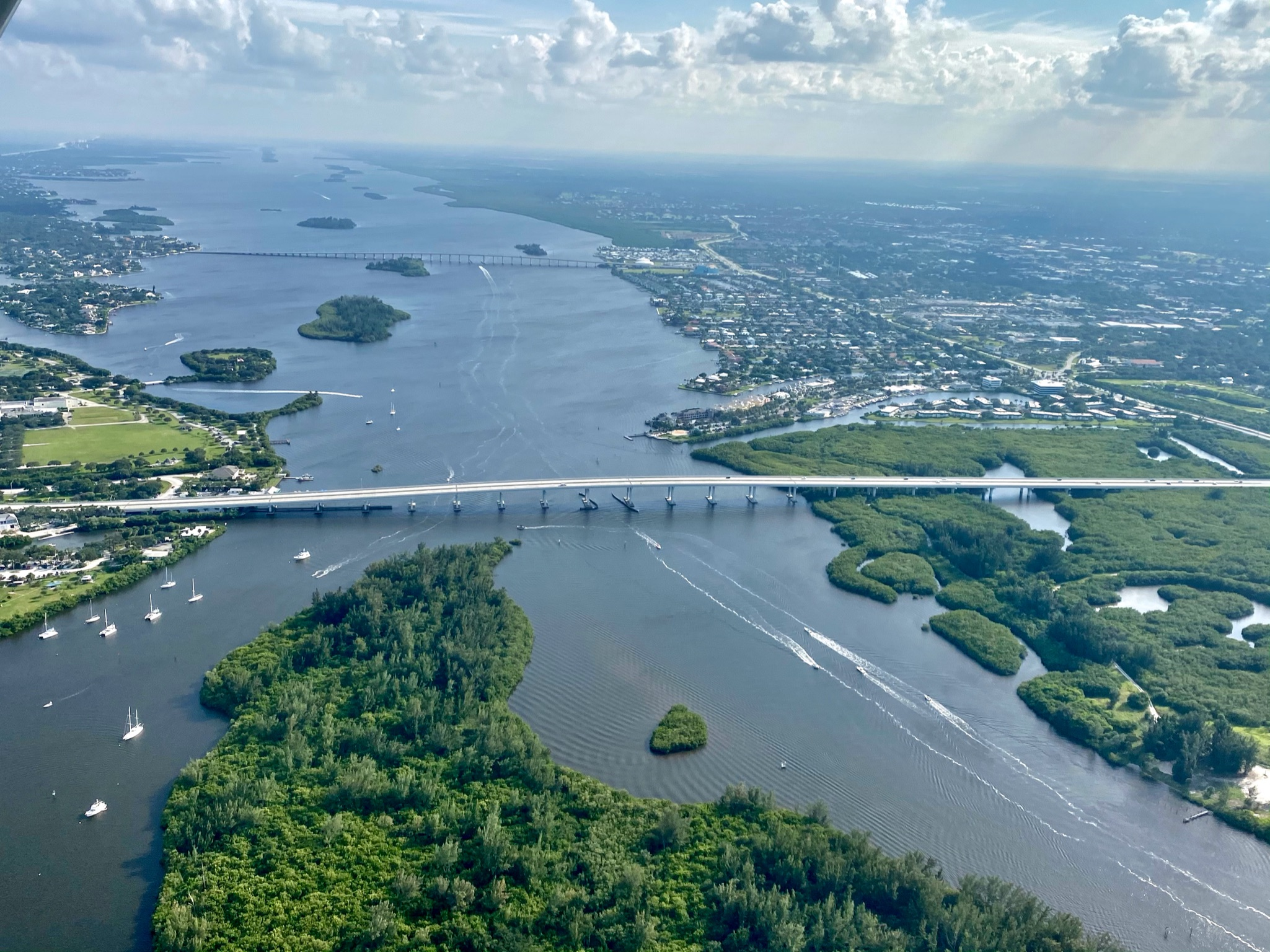
Aerial view looking south of the new barber bridge and the location of the previous drawbridge at royal palm pointe. Veterans Island and 17th St. bridge visible in the background.

The bridge replaced the old Barber Bridge, built in 1951, which was concrete and had a steel bascule span. This bridge was in constant state of disrepair and was removed, barged out to sea and sunk to become a reef. The steel bascule span was purchased by Disney and is in Orlando at the Walt Disney World theme park.
