= Raeburn C. Horne =

American politician

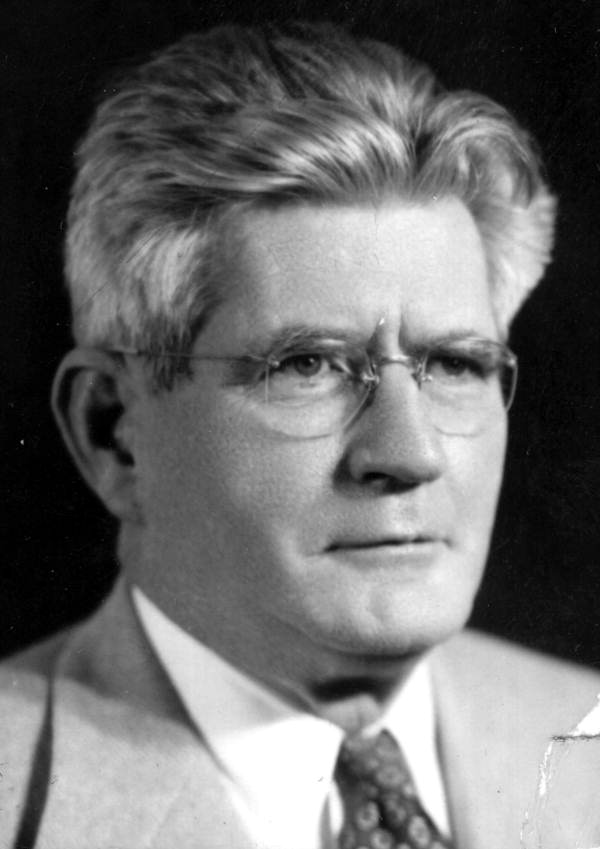

Member of the Florida House of Representatives for Madison County
- In office 1931, 1957

Personal details
- Born: October 7, 1896 Florida, U.S.
- Died: November 6, 1962 (aged 66) Hamilton County, Florida, U.S.
- Party: Democratic
- Spouse: Esther Knight

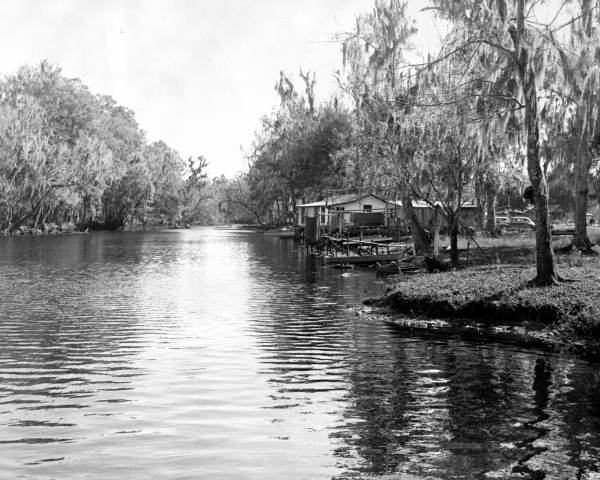
Aucilla River at Nutall Rise by Horne's fish camp

Raeburn C. Horne (October 7, 1896 – November 6, 1962) was a politician in the state of Florida. He served in the Florida House of Representatives in 1931 and 1957, as a Democrat, representing Madison County.

Horne was a member of the Pork Chop Gang, a group of legislators from rural areas that dominated the state legislature due to malapportionment and used their power to engage in McCarthyist tactics. The group often met at his fish camp at Nutall Rise in Taylor County, along the Aucilla River.
