= Louis B. Vocelle =

American politician

Louis B. "Buck" Vocelle

Member of the Florida House of Representatives from Indian River County
- In office 1957–1962
- Preceded by: Sherman N. Smith Jr.
- Succeeded by: Arthur E. "Art" Karst

Personal details
- Born: August 4, 1926
- Died: November 30, 1996 (aged 70)

Louis B. "Buck" Vocelle (August 4, 1926 – November 30, 1996) was a member of the Florida House of Representatives in from 1957 to 1962. He also served as chief judge of the Nineteenth Judicial Circuit Court of Florida.

Political offices
Preceded by Sherman N. Smith Jr.	Member of the Florida House of Representatives from Indian River County; 1957–1962	Succeeded by Arthur E. Karst
