= J&J Hunt submerged archaeological site =

Underwater archaeological site

Coordinates: 30.0198°N 84.008°W

J&J Hunt Site (8JE740) is an inundated prehistoric archaeological site located 6 km off the coast of northwestern Florida. The site which was discovered in 1989 is located in 3.7 to 4.6 m of salt water in the Gulf of Mexico along the PaleoAucilla River. In prehistory the site had at least two different occupations: a Late Paleoindian-Early Archaic and Middle Archaic. The J&J Hunt site was a major focus of the PaleoAucilla Prehistory Project conducted by Michael K. Faught.

== Submerged Paleoindian archaeology ==
Excavating submerged prehistoric sites on the continental shelf around Florida, and in other regions, helps archaeologists gain insight about prehistoric settlement patterns and aids in the reconstruction of the prehistoric landscape. By recovering and analyzing prehistoric stone tools, terrestrial faunal remains, and terrestrial floral remains – such as, helps excavators infer that the site was not fully inundated throughout prehistory.

In the late Pleistocene and early Holocene periods, much of the continental shelf around Florida was exposed and occupied by prehistoric people. During these periods the continental shelf was a vastly different landscape and was home to a variety of plants and animals, including forests and megafauna. It was not until the Holocene, as sea water transgressed, that the continent shelf was transformed into marsh lands and brackish water, eventually becoming fully inundated.

== PaleoAucilla Prehistory Project ==
The PaleoAucilla Prehistory Project (PAPP) was part of Florida State University's Program in Underwater Archaeology which at the time of this project was directed by Dr. Michael K. Faught. The main initiative of PAPP was to "search for and examine prehistoric archaeological sites on the continental shelf of Northwestern Florida". Since the J&J Hunt site's discovery in 1989, research has been carried out in six field seasons – 1992, 1998, 1999, 2000, 2001, and 2002.

== Sea-level rise ==
During the Late Glacial Maximum (ca. 18,000 years ago) the continental shelf around the Gulf Coast of Florida was exposed for at least 185 km from the present-day mouth of the Aucilla River. At this time and for the next 7,000 years the sea-level was around 90 m lower than today's present level. Then around 14,000 B.P. until approximately 11,000 B.P., at the onset of the Younger Dryas, massive melting of the ice sheets resulted in sea level rise and transgression of the continental shelf to about 140 km from the mouth of the Aucilla River. A second glacial melting began after 10,000 B.P. and lasted until about 7,000 B.P. when sea levels became relatively constant. As sea levels rose it forced people settled along the coast to move further and further inland.

== Paleoindian and Archaic culture in Florida ==
While the exact date of the peopling of the Americas is of major debate among archaeologists it is widely accepted that the first occupation occurred at least 13,500 – 14,000 years ago. Currently, the oldest known widespread Paleoindian culture in North America is the Clovis culture. It is believed that the Clovis people occupied many parts of North America by 13,500 years ago, including Florida. The next known occupation in North America (and Florida) is the Archaic culture. The archaeological evidence suggests that the Archaic culture appears after the Clovis culture around 11,500 years ago. The dates of these two cultures and the level of the sea at the time of their existence are very important to archaeologists. While many of these sites are unknown and lie underwater today, it is very important to remember that a site found on the coast or submerged in modern times was much farther inland in prehistory. In fact there are currently no known "truly" coastal Paleoindian sites with a maritime tradition.

== Stone tools recovered ==
During the excavations at the J&J Hunt site 1,632 lithic artifacts were recovered (Tobon and Pendleton 2002). "Tools consist of unifacial scrapers (22 percent), whole and broken bifacial items (42 percent), and utilized flakes (21 percent). Cores (mostly without much cortex) combine for a total of 18 percent of the tools, and hammer stones make up an additional 4 percent". The percentage of recovered bifacial lithic remains suggest the manufacture of bifaces and the remaining lithic finds indicate the possibility of tool re-use at the site. However, there is little evidence of secondary retouch flakes at the site. The fact that most of the cores and debitage are "mostly without much cortex" infers that the raw materials that these tools were manufactured from came from another location. This is supported by the fact that no quarry areas have been located at the site.

Among the artifact assemblage at the site there are several temporally diagnostic stone tools. Of the temporally diagnostic stone tools recovered seventeen have been projectile points and fragments. Among them was one late Paleoindian Suwannee base and possibly one Suwannee perform along with five side-notched Bolen projectile points. "Other tools found at J&J Hunt diagnostic of early Holocene age and activity include one broken adze bit and two formal unifacial side scrapers".

There are also several temporally diagnostic artifacts from the Middle Archaic period at the site. These include three Florida Archaic straight-stemmed points and one contracting-stemmed point. These points date to around 7,500 to 5,000 B.P., a period when the site is believed to have become completely submerged.

== Organic remains ==
Organic remains are the decaying matter of a once living organism. In this context organic remains are very important in determining if and when an underwater archaeological site was above water. Evidence of terrestrial faunal and floral remains found in undisturbed contexts strongly indicate that a site was at one time not submerged.

At the J&J Hunt site within one of the test pits excavated, "[…] a fragmentary cranium and dentition of a juvenile mastodon was found atop a sedimentological layer consisting of dolomitized silty clay". This is concrete evidence that the site was not always submerged in prehistory. Further "Within the contact zone of the marine and dolomitized silty clay sediments, charcoal, bone, and early Archaic artifacts were found in abundance". Evidence of human occupation levels further back-up the evidence that the site was not fully inundated throughout prehistory.

By analyzing the organic remains and global paleoclimate data archaeologists and other scientists can determine very reasonable dates for when a site was not submerged and when it became fully inundated. In the case of the J&J Hunt site, it is believed that around its final occupation 7,000 years ago the site slowly became fully inundated, with a latest possible date of transgression around 5,000 B.P.
