= John M. McCarty =

American politician

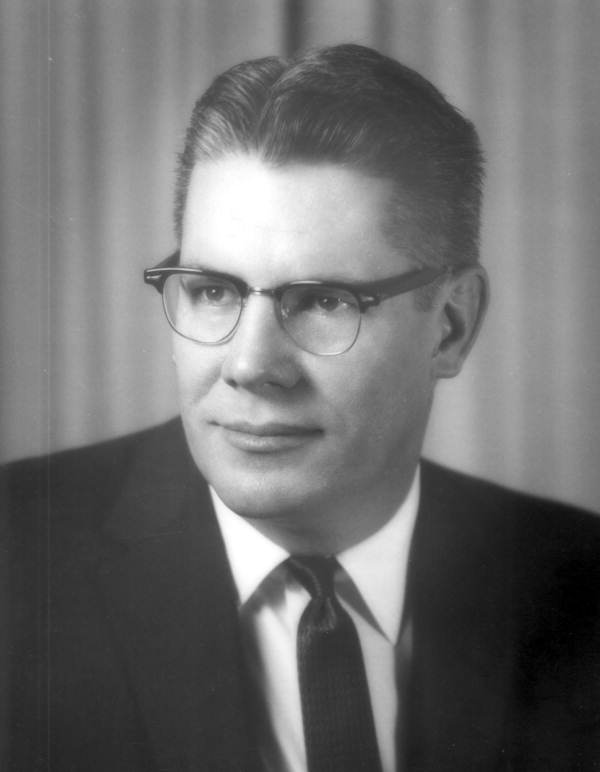
- McCarty in 1963

Member of the Florida Senate from the 12th district
- In office 1963–1967
- Preceded by: Harry J. Kicliter
- Succeeded by: Verle Pope

Personal details
- Born: November 23, 1915 Fort Pierce, Florida, U.S.
- Died: May 19, 1995 (aged 79)
- Party: Democratic
- Relatives: Dorothy Sample (cousin); Daniel T. McCarty (brother)

John M. McCarty (November 23, 1915 – May 19, 1995) was an American politician. He served as a Democratic member for the 12th District of the Florida Senate.

== Life and career ==
Born in Fort Pierce, Florida, McCarty served in the Florida Senate from 1963 to 1967, representing the 12th district. He died on May 19, 1995, at the age of 79.
