= Florida State Road 656 =

State highway in Florida, United States

State Road 656
- 17th Street

Route information
- Maintained by FDOT
- Length: 1.978 mi (3.183 km)

Major junctions
- West end: US 1 in Vero Beach
- East end: SR A1A in Vero Beach

Location
- Country: United States
- State: Florida
- Counties: Indian River

Highway system
- Florida State Highway System; Interstate; US; State; Former; Pre‑1945; Toll; Scenic
← SR 655	→ SR 659

State Road 656 (SR 656), also known as 17th Street, is a two-mile-long (3.2 km) state road in Indian River County, extending from U.S. Route 1 (US 1) to SR A1A mostly inside the city limits of Vero Beach. It is the southernmost of two crossings in Vero Beach between the mainland and the barrier island, with the other being at State Road 60 1.4 miles (2.3 km) to the north.

== Route description ==
State Road 656 begins at US 1 at the intersection of 17th Street in central Vero Beach, with SR 656 heading east on 17th Street. It passes through a commercial, then residential area before intersecting with County Road 603. The road crosses the Intracoastal Waterway to Dark Point on the barrier island, and ends at State Road A1A.

=== West of U.S. Route 1 ===
The road becomes a city street west of US 1. It is longer than SR 656 and is called 16th Street. Immediately west of the Florida East Coast Railway is County Road 605. The road is now only 2 lanes wide like SR 510. It becomes a residential street beyond this point. Next, it passes another intersection of former State Road 607. This road provides access to Vero Beach Municipal Airport. Then, it intersects with County Road 611, this road provides access to the farmlands of southern Indian River County and northern St. Lucie County. One block west of 56th Court is Kings Highway, the western terminus of 16th Street.

== Major intersections ==
The entire route is in Indian River County.

Location	mi	km	Destinations	Notes
Vero Beach	0.000	0.000	US 1 (SR 5)	Western terminus
Vero Beach	0.639	1.028	CR 603 (Indian River Boulevard) to SR 60	
Vero Beach	0.716– 1.614	1.152– 2.597	Alma Lee Loy Bridge over Indian River (Atlantic Intracoastal Waterway)	
Vero Beach	1.978	3.183	SR A1A	Eastern terminus
1.000 mi = 1.609 km; 1.000 km = 0.621 mi
