= Bayard Redstone =

American politician

Bayard Taylor Redstone

3rd Mayor of Vero Beach, Florida
- In office December 12, 1923 – December 15, 1927
- Preceded by: Fred E. King
- Succeeded by: Alexander MacWilliam, Sr.

Member of the Florida House of Representatives from Indian River County
- In office 1929–1931
- Preceded by: Freeman L. Knight
- Succeeded by: Charles A. Mitchell

Personal details
- Born: March 13, 1879 New Brunswick, Canada
- Died: September 17, 1969 (aged 90) Indian River County, Florida, US
- Party: Democratic
- Spouse: Anna Maria Jeffries Redstone
- Occupation: lumber merchant

Military service
- Battles/wars: World War I

Bayard Taylor Redstone (March 13, 1879 – September 17, 1969) was the mayor of Vero Beach, Florida from December 12, 1923, to December 15, 1927. He was a member of the Florida House of Representatives from Indian River County from 1928 to 1933.

He was born in New Brunswick, Canada, the son of Charles G. and Alice Redstone.

He was the President of Redstone Lumber & Supply Company, and together with George Paddison formed the East Coast Retail Lumber Dealers Association in 1917.

Preceded by Fred E. King	Mayor of Vero Beach, Florida; December 12, 1923–December 15, 1927	Succeeded by Alexander MacWilliam, Sr.
Preceded by Freeman L. Knight	Members of the Florida House of Representatives from Indian River County; 1929–1931	Succeeded by Charles A. Mitchell
