= Cleveland Clinic Indian River Hospital =

- Cleveland Clinic

- Front entrance of the hospital seen in September 2026

Geography
- Location: 1000 36th St, Vero Beach, Florida 32960
- Coordinates: 27.6587087°N 80.3944608°W

Organisation
- Type: Teaching, Specialist
- Affiliated university: Edward Via College of Osteopathic Medicine

Services
- Beds: 332

Helipads
- Helipad: FAA LID: 3FD7

History
- Former names: Indian River Memorial Hospital, Indian River Medical Center
- Opened: 1932

Links
- Website: my.clevelandclinic.org/locations/directions/529-indian-river-hospital

Cleveland Clinic Indian River Hospital (CCIRH) is a private non-profit academic health center operated by Cleveland Clinic in Vero Beach, Florida. Established in 1932 as a small clinic with 21 beds, the hospital has grown to a significant regional medical center with 332 beds and specialized centers such as the Welsh Heart Center, Scully Endoscopy Center, and Scully-Welsh Cancer Center.

CCIRH is part of a larger surrounding medical complex between US-1 and CR-603 along 37th Street in Vero Beach. In the 2025-2026 U.S. News and World Report, CCIRH was ranked 28th for Florida hospitals. CCIRH is the second largest employer and largest healthcare employer in Indian River County, with over 2,600 employees.

== History ==
Indian River Hospital was established in 1932 as a small 21-bed clinic in Vero Beach was organized by Nurse Garnett Radin, Dr. E. Bacon Hardee, and funeral director Charles Cox. By 1952, now named Indian River Memorial Hospital (IRMH) had expanded to 35 beds and rebuilt to a new facility in the city.

In 1959, a special act of the Florida Legislature led to the creation of the Indian River Hospital District, with the establishment of a permanent 7-member publicly elected Board of Trustees. Following the creation of this district, the hospital complex expanded rapidly over the following years, with the hospital management being transferred for the non-profit Indian River Memorial Hospital organization in 1980, when the hospital location was moved to its present location north of Vero Beach.

In 2017, Indian River Medical Center began construction on the Scully Endoscopy Center for $6.1 million (2017 USD). The center opened in January 2018.

In 2018, due to financial struggles at Indian River Medical Center, hospital leaders sought deals to transfer ownership of the complex. Later that year, it was announced that Indian River Memorial Hospital would transfer ownership to Cleveland Clinic as part of a $250 million investment. The new management took effect on January 1, 2019, and the facility was renamed Cleveland Clinic Indian River Hospital.

=== Education ===
In 2024, The Edward Via College of Osteopathic Medicine began a residency program at CCIRH, with a three-story medical school facility currently being leased by the college on the hospital campus.

== Future ==
Over the next few years, numerous expansion projects are planned for CCIRH. The Emergency Department is currently the site of a significant $5.5 million project. This project includes an 8,750 square foot expansion of the department, as well as the renovation of existing facilities. The project is currently under construction and is expected to finish in 2026. In addition, a $30-million third-floor expansion to the Scully-Welsh Cancer Center is currently being planned.

== Facilities ==
Cleveland Clinic Indian River Hospital Information Sign

CCIRH operates multiple specialized centers on its campus including the following:

- 24/7 Emergency Department
- Scully Endoscopy Center
- Scully-Welsh Cancer Center
- Welsh Heart Center
- Wound Healing Center

In addition to CCIRH, Cleveland Clinic operates multiple off-site medical facilities surrounding the hospital. These locations include:

- Cleveland Clinic Indian River Orthopaedic Center
- Cleveland Clinic Indian River Behavioral Health Center
- Cleveland Clinic Vero Radiology
- Cleveland Clinic Indian River Hospital Dermatology
- Cleveland Clinic Indian River Hospital Rosner Family Health and Wellness Center

== See also ==
- Tampa General Hospital
- AdventHealth
- Orlando Health
- Jackson Health System
