= Anthony W. Young =

American politician

Anthony William Young

Member of the Florida Senate from the 33rd District
- In office 1929–1931
- Preceded by: L. W. Jennings
- Succeeded by: A. O. Kanner

Member of the Florida House of Representatives from St. Lucie County
- In office 1921–1925
- Preceded by: Richard Whyte
- Succeeded by: W. R. Jackson

1st and 5th Mayor of Vero Beach, Florida
- In office June 12, 1919 – December 14, 1921
- Preceded by: Office established
- Succeeded by: Fred E. King
- In office December 10, 1935 – December 15, 1937
- Preceded by: Alexander MacWilliam, Sr.
- Succeeded by: Wiley F. Cox

Personal details
- Born: 1866 Illinois
- Died: 1948 Indian River County, Florida
- Party: Democratic
- Spouse: Irene D. Young
- Children: George T. Young

Anthony William Young (1866–1948) was a part of the pioneer families of the Indian Rive County, Young was a manager at the Indian River Farms Company in 1914 to 1919. He then became the first mayor of Vero Beach, Florida, on June 12, 1919, when the city was first incorporated, to his leave of office on December 14, 1921. He also became the fifth mayor of Vero Beach from December 10, 1935, to December 15, 1937. Young was a member of the Florida House of Representatives from 1921 to 1925, and a member of the Florida Senate from 1929 to 1931. He is considered to be the founder of Indian River County because he was the legislative author of the act which created it by splitting it off from St. Lucie County in 1925.

== Early Political Career ==
Young had petitioned a bill in May 1925 that would separate Vero Beach from Fort Pierce and made their own county of Indian River.In June 1925, Young was elected the first Mayor of Vero Beach, FL.

Preceded by Office established	Mayor of Vero Beach, Florida; June 12, 1919–December 14, 1921	Succeeded by Fred E. King
Preceded by Richard Whyte	Member of the Florida House of Representatives from St. Lucie County; 1921–1925	Succeeded by W. R. Jackson
Preceded by L. W. Jennings	Member of the Florida Senate from the 33rd District; 1929–1931	Succeeded by A. O. Kanner
Preceded by Alexander MacWilliam, Sr.	Mayor of Vero Beach, Florida; December 10, 1935–December 15, 1937	Succeeded by Wiley F. Cox
