= Senator Ball =

Senator Ball may refer to:

== Members of the United States Senate ==
- Joseph H. Ball (1905–1993), U.S. Senator from Minnesota from 1940 to 1942
- L. Heisler Ball (1861–1932), U.S. Senator from Delaware from 1919 to 1925

== United States state senate members ==
- George Washington Ball (Iowa Democrat) (1847–1915), Iowa State Senate from 1900 to 1904
- George Washington Ball (Iowa Republican) (1848–1920), Iowa State Senate from 1917 to 1920
- Greg Ball (politician) (born 1977), New York State Senate
- William Lee Ball (1781–1824), Virginia State Senate
- William Ball (Michigan politician) (1830–1902), Michigan State Senate

== See also ==
- Senator Beall (disambiguation)
