= Senator Bell =

Senator Bell may refer to:

== Members of the United States Senate ==
- James Bell (New Hampshire politician) (1804–1857), U.S. Senator from New Hampshire from 1855 to 1857
- John Bell (Tennessee politician) (1796–1869), U.S. Senator from Tennessee from 1847 to 1859
- Samuel Bell (1770–1850), U.S. Senator for New Hampshire from 1823 to 1835

== United States state senate members ==
- Charles H. Bell (politician) (1823–1893), New Hampshire State Senate
- Charles J. Bell (politician) (1845–1909), Vermont State Senate
- Charles W. Bell (1857–1927), California State Senate
- Clarence D. Bell (1914–2002), Pennsylvania State Senate
- Colin Bell (American politician) (born 1981), New Jersey State Senate
- Greg Bell (politician) (born 1948), Utah State Senate
- Hiram Parks Bell (1827–1907), Georgia State Senate
- J. Spencer Bell (1906–1967), North Carolina State Senate
- James A. Bell (New York politician) (1814–?), New York State Senate
- John J. Bell (1910–1963), Texas State Senate
- John Bell (Florida politician) (1916–1982), Florida State Senate
- Joseph M. Bell (died 1851), Massachusetts lawyer, Massachusetts State Senate
- Lance Bell (fl. 2020s), Alabama State Senate
- Mike Bell (politician) (born 1963), Tennessee State Senate
- Robert C. Bell (1880–1964), Minnesota State Senate
- Sam Bell (Rhode Island politician) (fl. 2010s–2020s), Rhode Island State Senate

== See also ==
- Senator Beall (disambiguation)
