= J. Graham Black =

American politician (1889–1957)

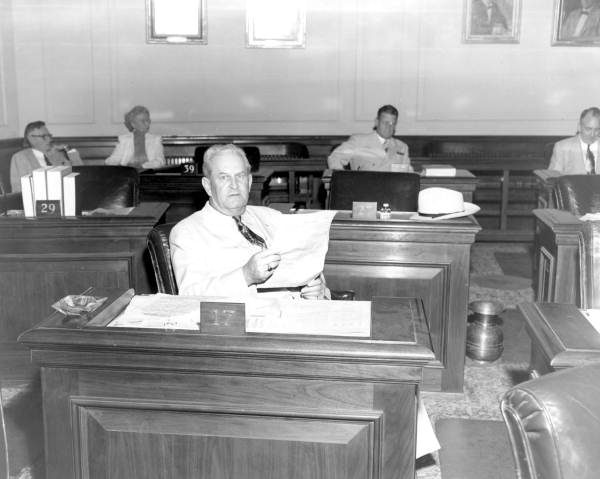
- Black in 1953

Member of the Florida Senate
- In office 1953–1955

Personal details
- Born: James Graham Black; June 22, 1889 Bamberg, South Carolina, U.S.
- Died: June 29, 1957 (aged 68) Hamilton County, Florida, U.S.
- Party: Democratic
- Spouse: Minnie Mabelle Vickers
- Education: Florida Southern College
- Occupation: turpentine producer, farmer

James Graham Black (June 22, 1889 – June 29, 1957) was an American politician in the state of Florida. He served in the Florida State Senate from 1953 to 1955 as a Democratic member for the 17th district. He was a member of the Pork Chop Gang, a group of legislators from rural areas that dominated the state legislature due to malapportionment and used their power to engage in McCarthyist tactics.
