= Sherman N. Smith Jr. =

American judge and politician

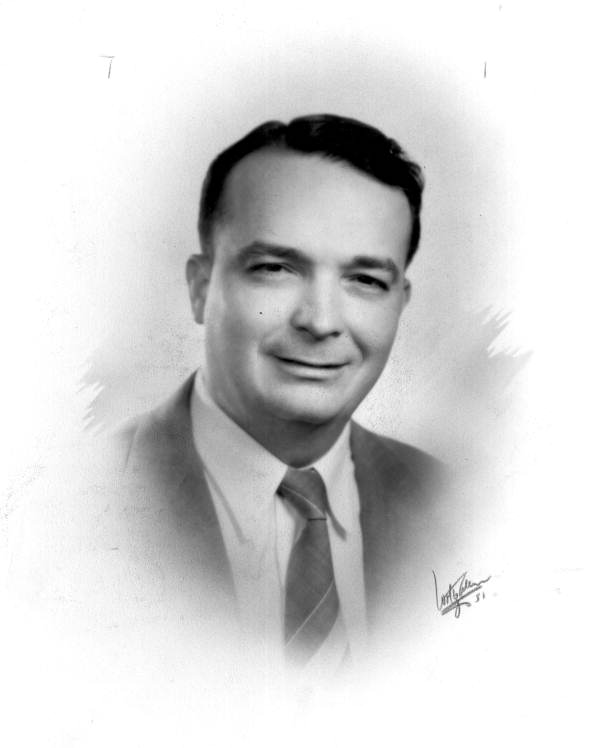
- Smith in 1953

Member of the Florida House of Representatives from Indian River County
- In office 1953–1956
- Preceded by: Alexander MacWilliam Sr.
- Succeeded by: Louis B. Vocelle

Judge of the Florida Second District Court of Appeal
- In office 1961–1965

Judge of the Florida Fourth District Court of Appeal
- In office 1965–1967

Personal details
- Born: June 13, 1914 Crossville, Tennessee, U.S.
- Died: January 7, 1998 (aged 83)
- Party: Democratic
- Spouse: Joyce Smith
- Children: 3
- Occupation: Judge

Sherman N. Smith Jr. (June 13, 1914 – January 7, 1998) was an American judge and politician. He served as a Democratic member of the Florida House of Representatives.

== Life and career ==
Smith was born in Crossville, Tennessee. He served in the United States Navy during World War II.

Smith was an attorney in Indian River County, Florida. In 1953, he was elected to the Florida House of Representatives, serving until 1956, when he was succeeded by Louis B. Vocelle.

In 1961, Smith was elected to serve as a judge for the Florida Second District Court of Appeal, serving until 1965, when he was elected to the Florida Fourth District Court of Appeal, serving until 1967.

Smith was married to Olive Heath Smith, with whom he raised three children. He died in January 1998 at the Indian River Memorial Hospital, at the age of 83.
