= J. O. Phillips =

American politician

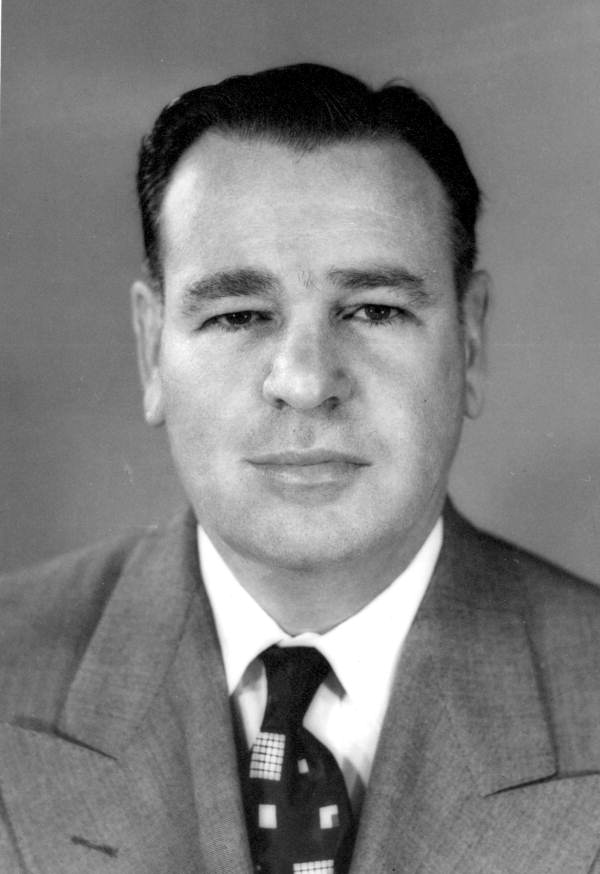
- Phillips in 1955

Member of the Florida Senate from the 14th district
- In office 1955
- Preceded by: J. Wofford Lindler
- Succeeded by: W. E. Bishop

Personal details
- Born: 1909
- Died: October 11, 1905 (aged 46)
- Party: Democratic

J. O. Phillips (1909 – October 11, 1955), also known as Jack O. Phillips, was an American politician. He served as a Democratic member for the 14th district of the Florida Senate.

== Life and career ==
Phillips was an attorney.

Phillips served in the Florida Senate in 1955, representing the 14th district.

Phillips died on October 11, 1955, at the age of 46.
