= Alexander MacWilliam Sr. =

American politician

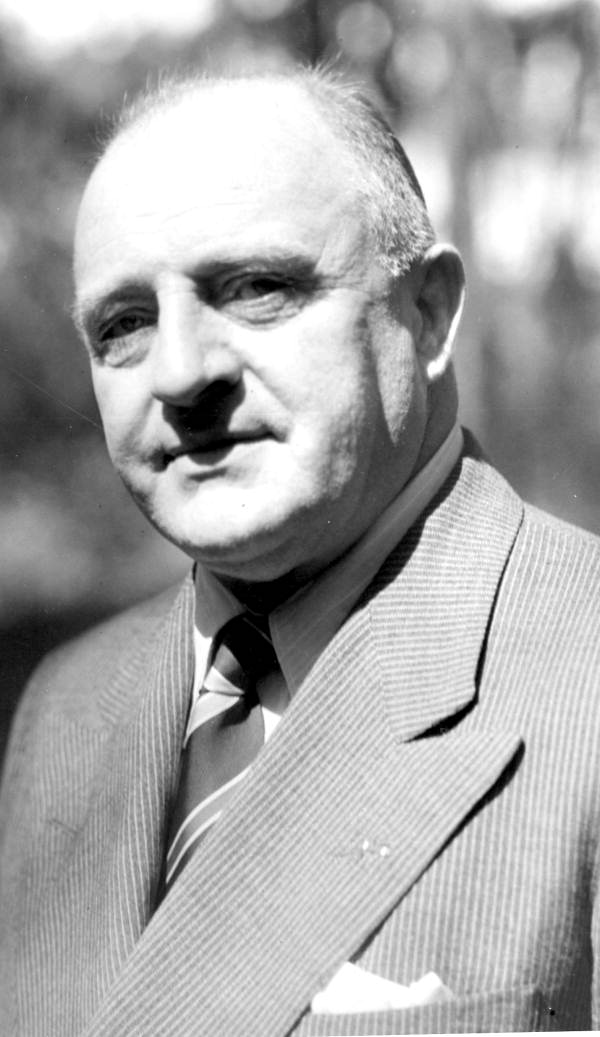
- MacWilliam in 1933

4th, 7th and 9th Mayor of Vero Beach, Florida
- In office December 15, 1927 – December 10, 1935
- Preceded by: Bayard Redstone
- Succeeded by: Anthony W. Young
- In office December 13, 1939 – December 11, 1947
- Preceded by: Wiley F. Cox
- Succeeded by: Merrill P. Barber
- In office December 14, 1949 – October 16, 1951
- Preceded by: Merrill P. Barber
- Succeeded by: Louis G. Burger

Member of the Florida House of Representatives from Indian River County
- In office 1933–1935
- Preceded by: Charles A. Mitchell
- Succeeded by: Eli C. Walker
- In office 1945–1953
- Preceded by: J. Hubert Graves
- Succeeded by: Sherman N. Smith Jr.

Personal details
- Born: May 25, 1891 Edinburgh, Scotland
- Died: August 13, 1966 Indian River County, Florida, US
- Party: Democratic
- Spouse: Delia Jeanette Flaherty MacWilliam (m. April 26, 1920)
- Occupation: landscape architect
- Awards: Purple Heart Distinguished Service Cross

Military service
- Branch/service: United States Army
- Unit: 313th Machine Gun Battalion
- Battles/wars: World War I: Battle of Meuse-Argonne

Alexander Duncan "Mac" MacWilliam Sr. (May 25, 1891 – August 13, 1966) was the mayor of Vero Beach, Florida from 1927 to 1935, from 1939 to 1947, and from 1949 to 1951, he also served in the Florida House of Representatives from Indian River County in the 1933, 1945, 1947, 1949 and 1951 sessions.

== Life ==
MacWilliam was born in Edinburgh, Scotland, and immigrated with his family to Cleveland, Ohio, when he was 18.

During World War I, serving with the 313th Machine Gun Battalion, 80th Division at the Battle of Meuse-Argonne, MacWilliam was shot in both legs while rescuing a trapped and wounded soldier. He was also the victim of a mustard gas attack, and suffered continuing health problems because of it. His doctor mentioned to him that he was investing in land in Florida, and MacWilliam decided to join him. In 1919, he moved from Ohio to Vero Beach, and he went on to supervise the construction of the golf course at Riomar. He met Jeanette Flaherty at the golf course, and married her in 1920.

In 1927, he was elected mayor. He supported the proposal to split off Indian River County from St. Lucie County. MacWilliam established the Indian River Mosquito Control Board, and introduced height restrictions on buildings.

== Legacy ==
- The Indian River Golf Foundation awards the Alex MacWilliam Sr. Trophy in memory of MacWilliam annually.

Preceded by Bayard Redstone	Mayor of Vero Beach, Florida; December 15, 1927–December 10, 1935	Succeeded by Anthony W. Young
Preceded by Wiley F. Cox	Mayor of Vero Beach, Florida; December 13, 1939–December 11, 1947	Succeeded by Merrill P. Barber
Preceded by Merrill P. Barber	Mayor of Vero Beach, Florida; December 13, 1949–October 16, 1951	Succeeded by Louis G. Burger
Preceded by Charles A. Mitchell	Member of the Florida House of Representatives from Indian River County; 1933–1935	Succeeded by Eli C. Walker
Preceded by J. Hubert Graves	Member of the Florida House of Representatives from Indian River County; 1945–1953	Succeeded by Sherman N. Smith Jr.
