= Woodrow M. Melvin =

American politician in Florida

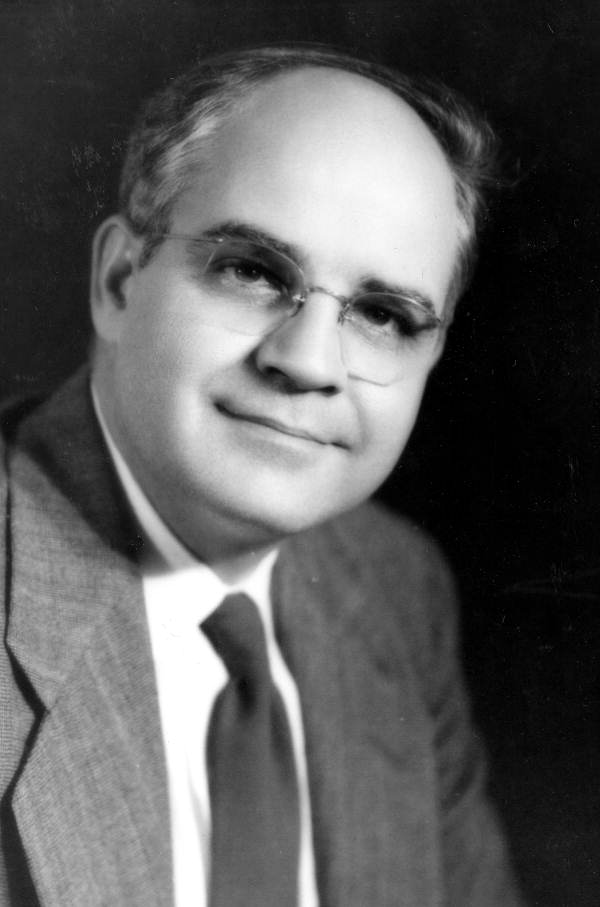

Member of the Florida Senate
- In office 1953–1955

Member of the Florida House of Representatives
- In office 1947–1952

Personal details
- Born: Woodrow Maxwell Melvin; December 16, 1912 Florida, U.S.
- Died: November 25, 1994 (aged 81) Escambia County, Florida, U.S.
- Party: Democratic
- Spouse: Juanita Weekes Melvin

Woodrow Maxwell Melvin Sr. (December 16, 1912 – November 25, 1994) was an American politician in the state of Florida.

He served in the Florida State Senate from 1953 to 1955 as a Democratic member for the 1st district. He also served briefly in the Florida House of Representatives, from 1947 to 1952 for Santa Rosa County. He was a member of the Pork Chop Gang, a group of legislators from rural areas that dominated the state legislature due to malapportionment and used their power to engage in McCarthyist tactics.
