= Philip D. Beall Sr. =

American politician (1891–1943)

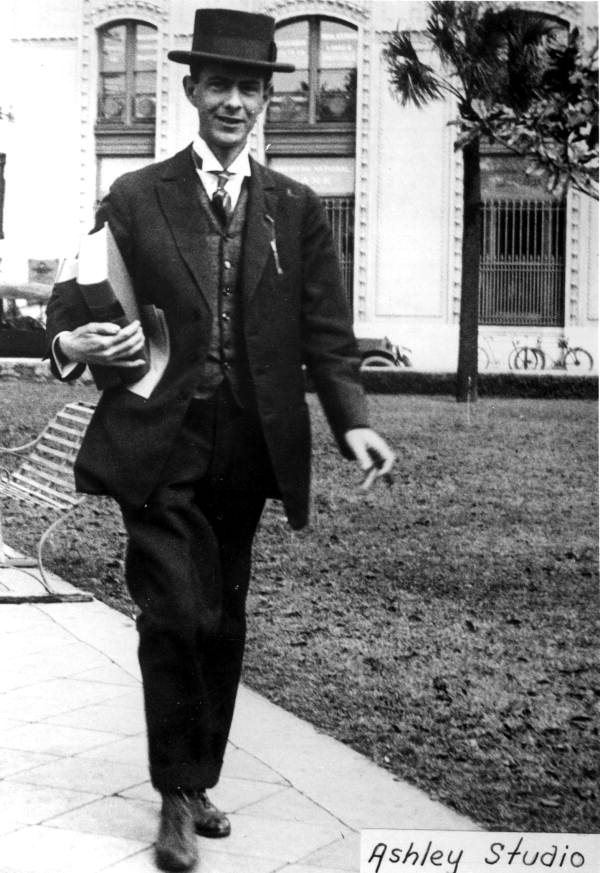
- Beall in 1913

Member of the Florida Senate from the 2nd district
- In office 1935–1943

Personal details
- Born: February 17, 1891 San Antonio, Texas, U.S.
- Died: December 14, 1943 (aged 52)
- Party: Democratic
- Children: 2; including Philip D. Beall Jr.

Philip D. Beall Sr. (February 17, 1891 – December 14, 1943) was an American politician. He served as a Democratic member for the 2nd district of the Florida Senate.

== Life and career ==
Beall was born in San Antonio, Texas.

Beall served in the Florida Senate from 1945 to 1953, representing the 2nd district.

Beall died on December 14, 1943, at the age of 53.
