= Edwin Fraser =

American politician

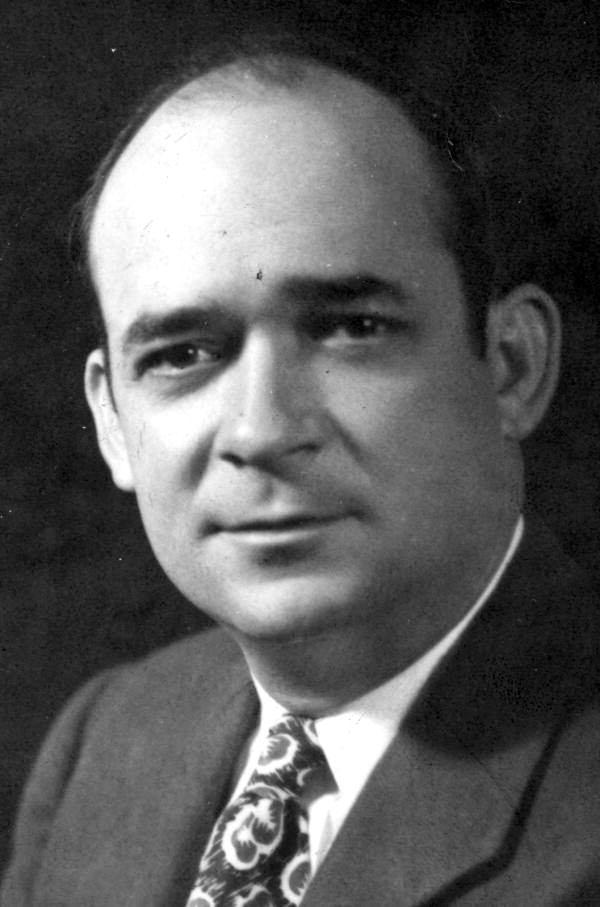

Member of the Florida Senate
- In office 1945–1948, 1953–1955, 1961–1963

Member of the Florida House of Representatives from Baker County
- In office 1937–1940

Personal details
- Born: Edwin Gardner Fraser; December 30, 1914 Florida, U.S.
- Died: December 23, 1978 (aged 63) Baker County, Florida, U.S.
- Party: Democratic
- Spouse: Jessie T. Fraser

Edwin Gardner Fraser (December 30, 1914 – December 23, 1978) was an American politician in the state of Florida.

He served in the Florida State Senate from 1945 to 1948, 1953 to 1955, and 1961 to 1963 as a Democratic member for the 29th district. He also served briefly in the Florida House of Representatives, from 1937 to 1940 for Baker County. He was a member of the Pork Chop Gang, a group of legislators from rural areas that dominated the state legislature due to malapportionment and used their power to engage in McCarthyist tactics.
