= Aucilla River =

River in Florida and Georgia, United States

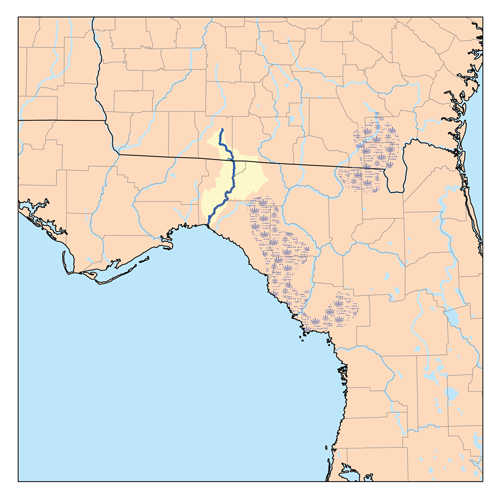

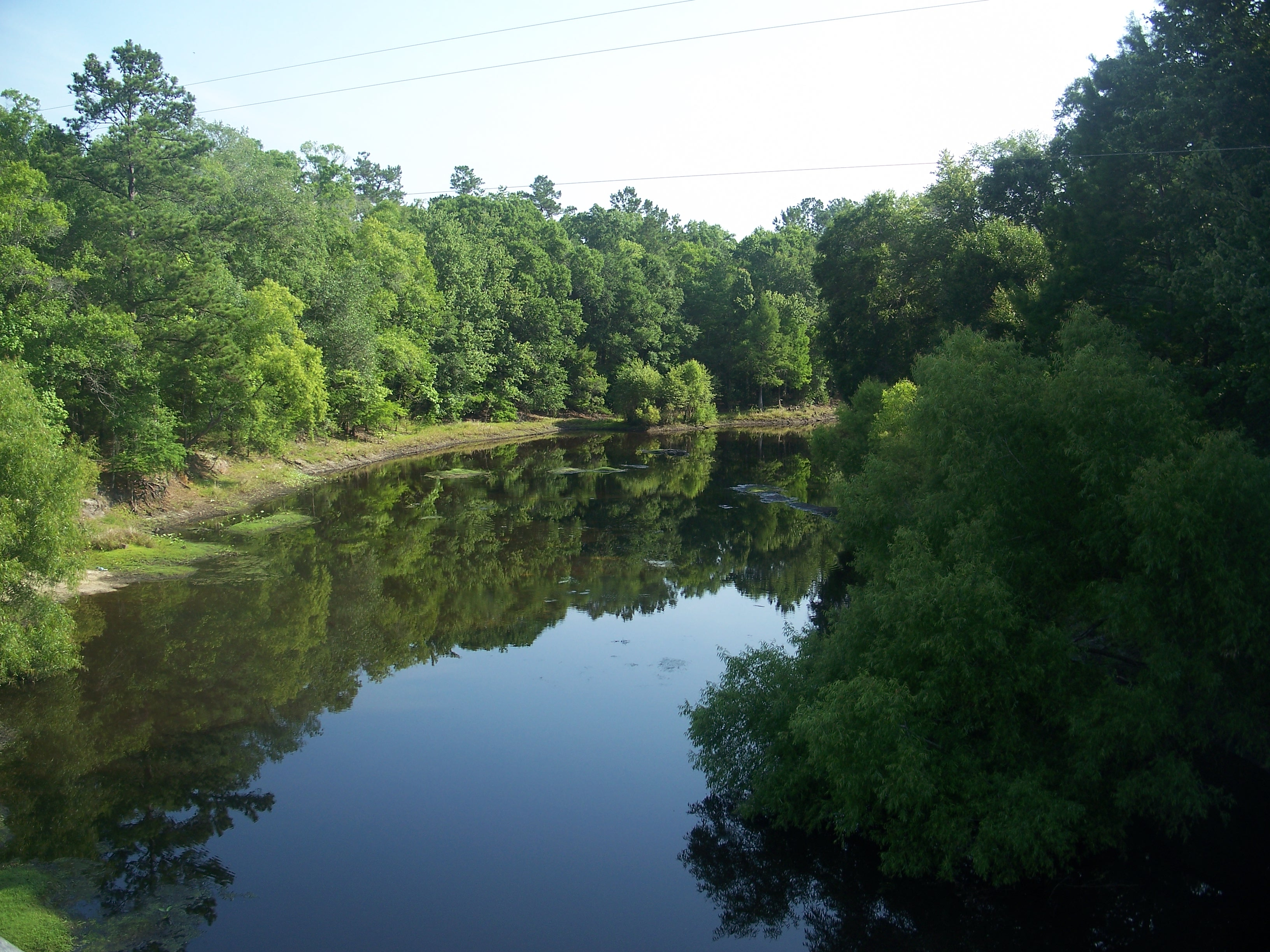
Aucilla River view from a bridge in Lamont, Florida

The Aucilla River rises in Thomas County, Georgia, USA, close to Thomasville, and passes through the Big Bend region of Florida, emptying into the Gulf of Mexico at Apalachee Bay. Some early maps called it the Ocilla River. It is 89 miles (143 km) long and has a drainage basin of 747 square miles (1,930 km^{2}). Tributaries include the Little Aucilla and Wacissa Rivers. In Florida, the Aucilla River forms the eastern border of Jefferson County, separating it from Madison County on the northern part, and from Taylor County to the south.

During the first Spanish period in Florida the Aucilla River was the boundary between the Apalachee people and the Timucua-speaking Yustaga (or Uzachile) people. The name "Aucilla" refers to an old Timucua village.

== Course and features ==
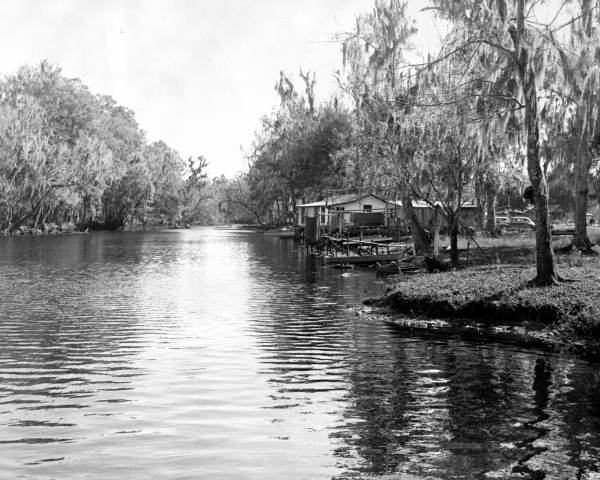
River at Nutall Rise bordering Raeburn C. Horne's fish camp

The Aucilla River flows across a karst landscape, disappearing underground and then reappearing, first at Howell Sinks near Boston, Georgia, and then approximately 30 times in the area known as the Aucilla River Sinks on the lower part of the river. Between the Florida-Georgia State line and U.S. Highway 90 the river flows through an area of springs, sinkholes and marshes without a main channel. From U.S. 90 to a few miles south of Lamont the river flows in a steep-sided valley with whitewater rapids. The Aucilla River Sinks, where many segments of the river are underground, starts north of Goose Pasture Road and runs to where the Wacissa River joins the Aucilla. The final few miles of the Aucilla below the mouth of the Wacissa flows over a broad floodplain.

Although the Wacissa River is the largest tributary of the Aucilla River, it breaks into a number of braided channels before reaching the Aucilla. In the first half of the 19th century, cotton growers of Jefferson and Madison Counties wanted to carry their cotton to seaports on the coast, but the intermittent underground segments of the Aucilla River and the narrow and shallow braided channels of the lower Wacissa did not permit the passage of barges. The Wacissa and Aucilla Navigation Company was chartered in 1831 to dig a canal from the navigable portion of the Wacissa to below Nuttall Rise, where the Aucilla returns above ground for the last time before reaching the Gulf of Mexico. Construction of the canal did not start until 1851. Slaves from local plantations were hired from their owners to dig the canal, which was cut through limestone. Work on the canal was halted in 1856, while parts of the canal were still too shallow for loaded barges. By that time, railroads had reached the plantation country, removing the urgency of the need for the canal. In the 21st century, a proposal to rename the Slave Canal proved to be unpopular and failed. Today, the Slave Canal is a popular paddling trail maintained by the state of Florida.

== Fossils and ancient people ==
The Aucilla River is a rich source of late Pleistocene and early Holocene animal bones and human artifacts. Close to 40 underwater archaeological sites have been identified in the river. The Florida Museum of Natural History's Aucilla River Prehistory Project studied several of the sites for 15 years, ending in 1998. The Page–Ladson site, which was examined again in 2012-2014 by a group sponsored by the Center for the Study of First Americans, is one of the best documented and earliest of pre-Clovis culture sites in North America. As of 2006, the Sloth Hole site was "believed to be one of the three oldest Clovis sites in the Americas." More than half of the "academically known worked ivory in the New World" has been collected from Sloth Hole. In the early 2000s, the Paleo Aucilla project led by Dr. Michael Faught investigated the Aucilla River (the PaleoAucilla) that has been submerged by the rise in sea level since the late Pleistocene Epoch. Two important sites have been found in the ancient channel of the Aucilla River that are now underwater in Apalachee Bay, the J&J Hunt and Ontolo sites. Currently, Dr. Jessi Halligan from Florida State University leads the effort to study the Pleistocene conditions of the Aucilla River.

== Crossings ==
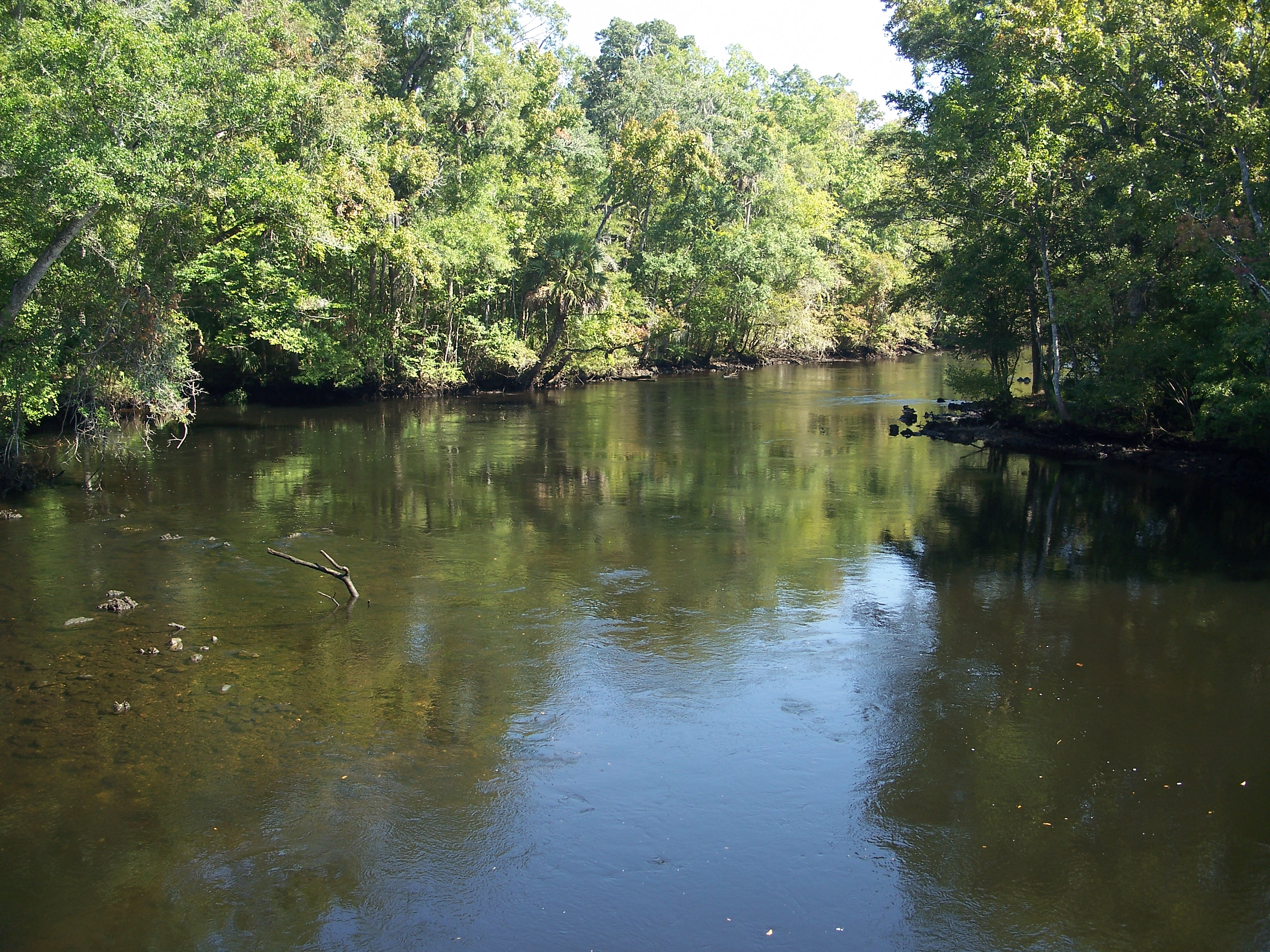
Jefferson and Taylor county division, at US 98 bridge

Crossing	Carries	Image	Location	Coordinates
=== Georgia ===
	Ponder Road			30.9193°N 83.8830°W
	Lawhorne Road			30.912170°N 83.878882°W
	SR 122		Pavo to Thomasville	30.8924°N 83.8556°W
	Coffee Road		Barwick to Thomasville	30.8815°N 83.8507°W
	Ozell Road			30.8634°N 83.8579°W
	Summerhill Road			30.8442°N 83.8569°W
	US 84 / SR 38		Eason to Thomasville	30.8146°N 83.8617°W
Rail bridge	CSX; Line formerly known as the Atlantic and Gulf Railroad			30.8061°N 83.8616°W
	New Hope Road		Eason to Metcalf	30.7947°N 83.8561°W
Howell Sinks	The Aucilla becomes a subterranean river for 2 miles			30.7961°N 83.8393°W
	SR 33		Boston to Monticello	30.7791°N 83.8031°W
	Whitney Camp Road		Boston	30.7446°N 83.7859°W
	12 Mile Post Road		Grooverville	30.7122°N 83.7451°W
=== Florida ===
	CR 146		Sneads Smokehouse Lake	30.5963°N 83.7211°W
	US 90		Aucilla	30.4922°N 83.7310°W
Rail bridge	CSX; Line formerly known as the Pensacola and Georgia Railroad			30.4750°N 83.7277°W
	I-10			30.4455°N 83.7243°W
Seven Bridges	Seven Bridges Road/ CR 331			30.4349°N 83.7218°W
Rail bridge	(Defunct) Former ACL Thomasville—Dunnellon Line		Lamont	30.3721°N 83.8064°W
	US 19 / US 27		Lamont	30.3707°N 83.8070°W
Walker Springs Bridge	CR 257 / CR 14			30.2732°N 83.8571°W
	Oneal Side (Defunct)			30.2310°N 83.9187°W
	The Aucilla River becomes a subterranean river intermittently for over 5 miles			30.2040°N 83.9255°W
a natural bridge	Goose Pasture Road		Goose Pasture	30.2009°N 83.9248°W
a natural bridge	an abandoned dirt road			30.1948°N 83.9271°W
a natural bridge	an abandoned dirt road			30.1920°N 83.9374°W
a natural bridge	an abandoned dirt road			30.1843°N 83.9512°W
a natural bridge			Nutall Rise	30.1506°N 83.9628°W
SP4 Billy Jacob Hartsfield Memorial Bridge	US 98		Nutall Rise	30.1462°N 83.9727°W
Rail bridge	(Defunct)			30.1281°N 83.9738°W

== See also ==
- List of fossil sites (with link directory)
- South Atlantic-Gulf Water Resource Region

Media related to Aucilla River at Wikimedia Commons
