= H. B. Douglas =

American politician

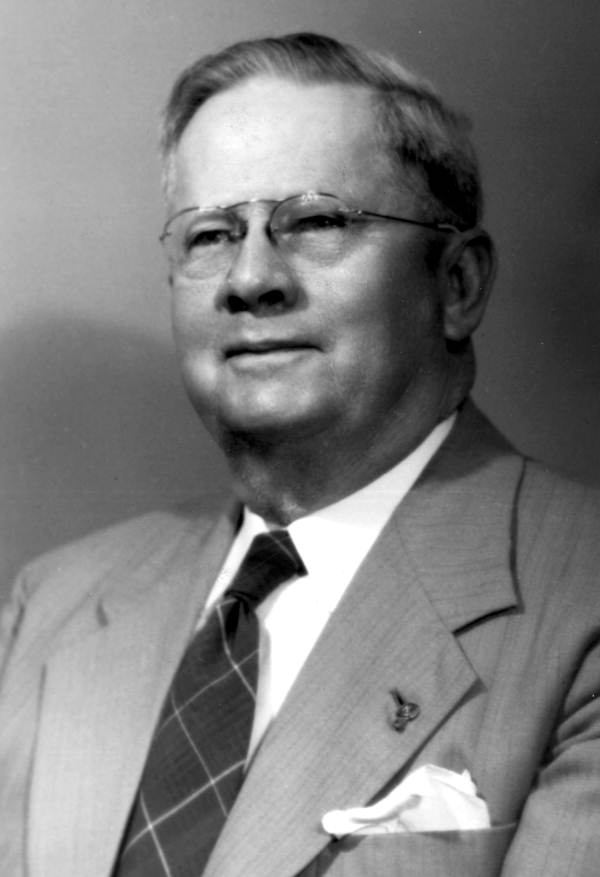

Member of the Florida Senate
- In office 1953–1955

Personal details
- Born: Henderson Bryant Douglas; December 25, 1888 Brewton, Alabama, U.S.
- Died: August 24, 1971 (aged 82) Bonifay, Florida, U.S.
- Party: Democratic
- Spouse: Perry
- Children: five
- Occupation: banker, druggist

Henderson Bryant Douglas (December 25, 1888 – August 24, 1971) was an American politician in the state of Florida. He served in the Florida State Senate from 1953 to 1955 as a Democratic member for the 3rd district. He was a member of the Pork Chop Gang, a group of legislators from rural areas that dominated the state legislature due to malapportionment and used their power to engage in McCarthyist tactics.
