= W. E. Bishop =

American Democratic Party politician (1915–1990)

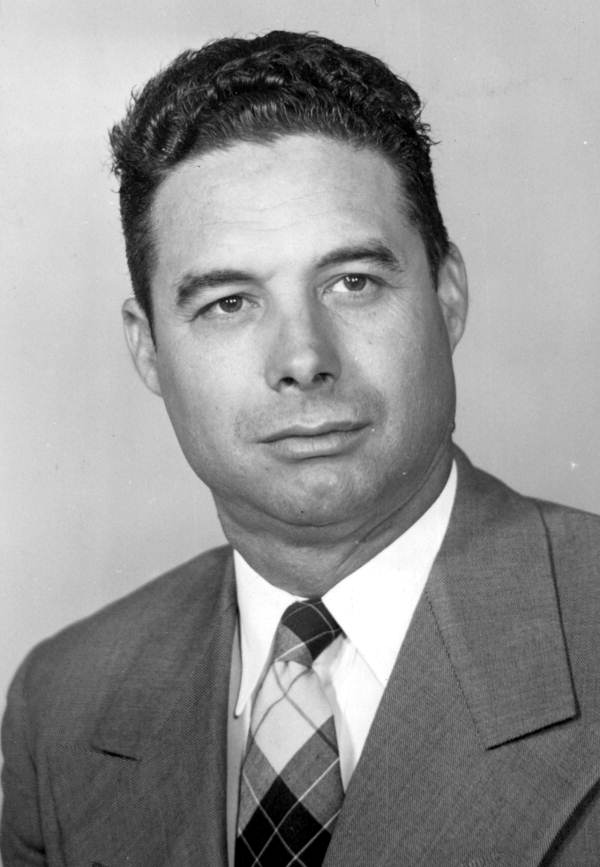

Member of the Florida House of Representatives from Columbia County
- In office 1955–1956

Member of the Florida Senate from the 14th district
- In office 1956–1957
- Preceded by: J. O. Phillips
- Succeeded by: G. T. Melton

Member of the Florida Senate from the 6th district
- In office 1968–1972
- Preceded by: L. P. Gibson
- Succeeded by: Jim Williams

Personal details
- Born: Waldo Emerson Bishop; January 14, 1915 Florida, U.S.
- Died: January 30, 1990 (aged 75) Lake City, Florida, U.S.
- Party: Democratic
- Spouse: Virginia Hodges

Waldo Emerson Bishop (January 14, 1915 – January 30, 1990) was an American politician in the state of Florida and a Democrat.

He served in the Florida Senate from 1956 to 1957 and again from 1968 to 1972 as a Democratic member for the 14th district (first term) and 6th district (second term). He also served briefly in the Florida House of Representatives from 1955 to 1956. He was a member of the Pork Chop Gang, a group of legislators from rural areas that dominated the state legislature due to malapportionment and used their power to engage in McCarthyist tactics.
