= Harry Stratton =

American politician

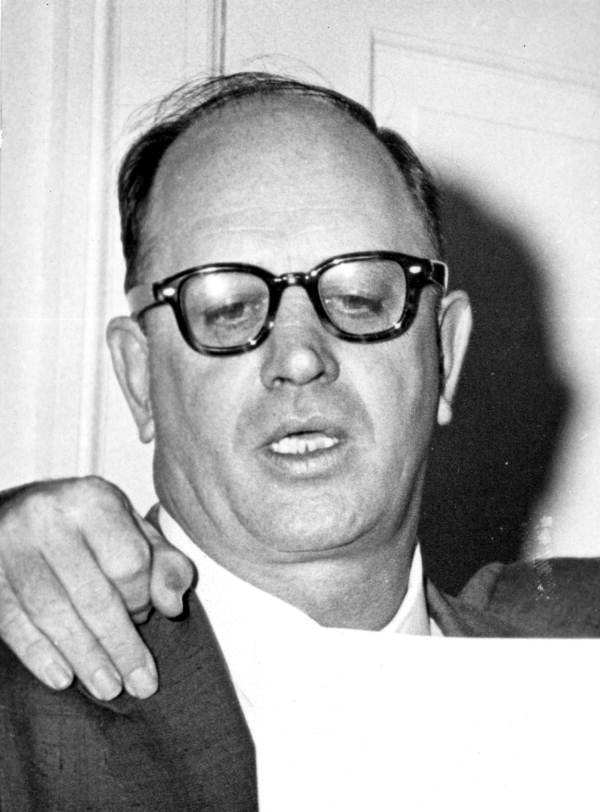

Member of the Florida Senate
- In office 1955–1965

Personal details
- Born: Harry Onis Stratton; March 23, 1910 Tellico Plains, Tennessee, U.S.
- Died: August 6, 1972 (aged 62) Leon County, Florida, U.S.
- Party: Democratic
- Children: five
- Occupation: Insurance agent

Harry Onis Stratton (March 23, 1910 – August 6, 1972) was an American politician in the state of Florida.

He served in the Florida State Senate from 1955 to 1965 as a Democratic member for the 16th district. In 1963, he was president pro tempore of the Senate. He also served briefly in the Florida House of Representatives, from 1945 to 1950. He was a member of the Pork Chop Gang, a group of legislators from rural areas that dominated the state legislature due to malapportionment and used their power to engage in McCarthyist tactics.
