= Philip D. Beall Jr. =

American politician

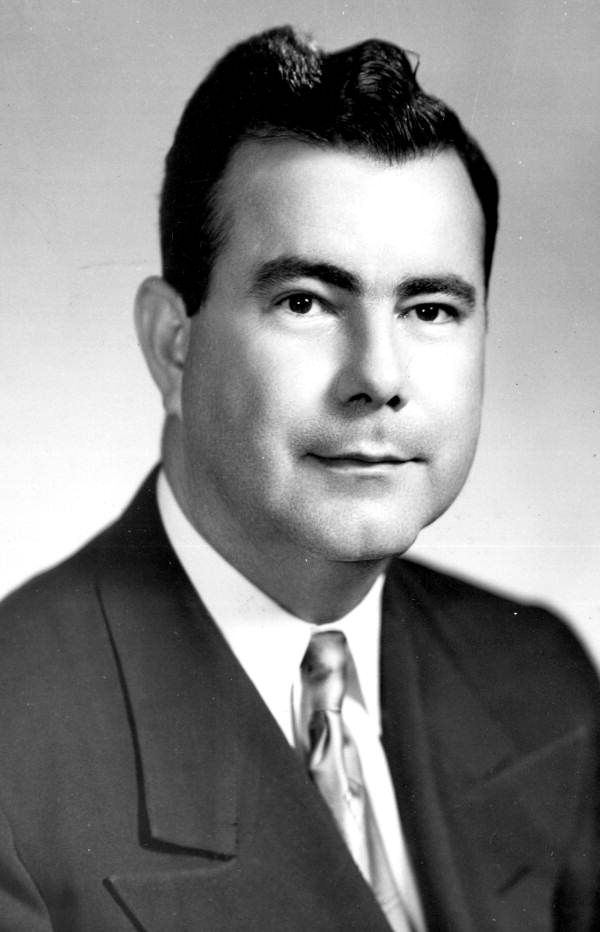

Member of the Florida Senate
- In office 1947–1962

Personal details
- Born: Philip Dane Beall Jr. June 15, 1915 Pensacola, Florida, U.S.
- Died: April 12, 1988 (aged 72) Gulf Breeze, Florida, U.S.
- Party: Democratic
- Spouse: Mary Ella Rivale

Philip Dane Beall Jr. (June 15, 1915 – April 12, 1988) was an American politician in the state of Florida. He served in the Florida State Senate from 1947 to 1962 as a Democratic member for the 2nd district. He succeeded his father, Philip D. Beall Sr. in the State Senate after his death in 1947.

A member of the Pork Chop Gang, he was active in tve group of legislators from rural areas that dominated the state legislature due to malapportionment and used their power to engage in McCarthyist tactics.
