= Alma Lee Loy Bridge =

Concrete bridge in United States

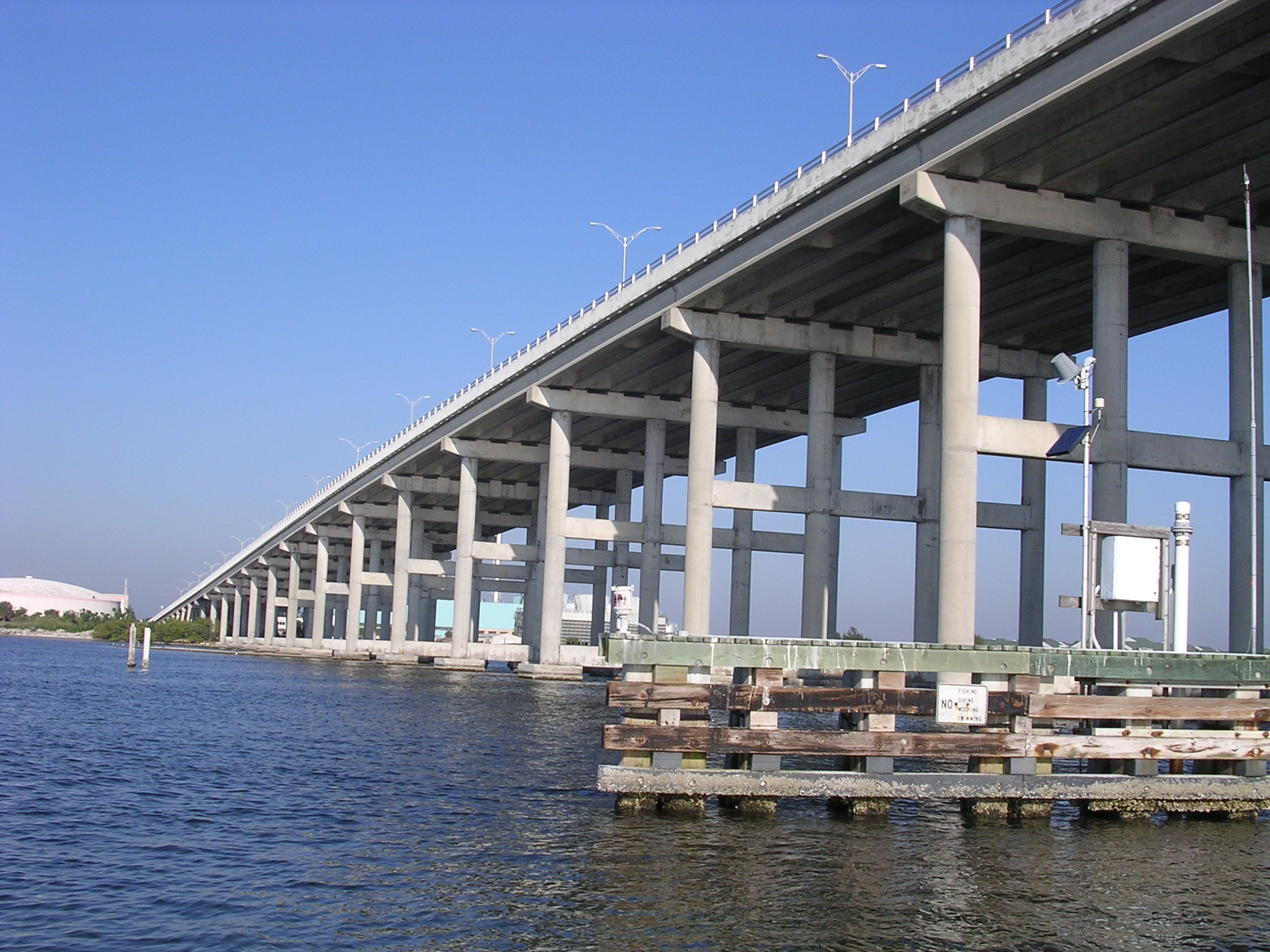
- Coordinates: 27.632°N 80.368°W
- Carries: SR 656 (17th Street)
- Crosses: Indian River
- Locale: Indian River County, Florida

Characteristics
- Design: Concrete deck 4 lane

History
- Opened: 1979

Location
- Interactive map of Alma Lee Loy Bridge

The Alma Lee Loy Bridge (known locally as the 17th Street Bridge), is a fixed concrete bridge that spans the Indian River intracoastal waterway in Indian River County, Florida. The bridge, started in 1977, was constructed by Gulf Contracting Inc, FL and was completed in 1979.

The Florida Department of Transportation bridge number is 880077.

The bridge has a total of four motor vehicle lanes and two bicycle lanes. The vertical clearance is 65 ft (20 m).

On the river it crosses the ICW at Statute Mile 953, south of flashing day beacon #145A.

== Structural Issues ==
In 2018, the bridge was found to be in critical condition, needing prompt repair. It was assessed to be structurally deficient in May 2020 according to Florida Department of Transportation inspection reports. A major overhaul was planned for 2024.

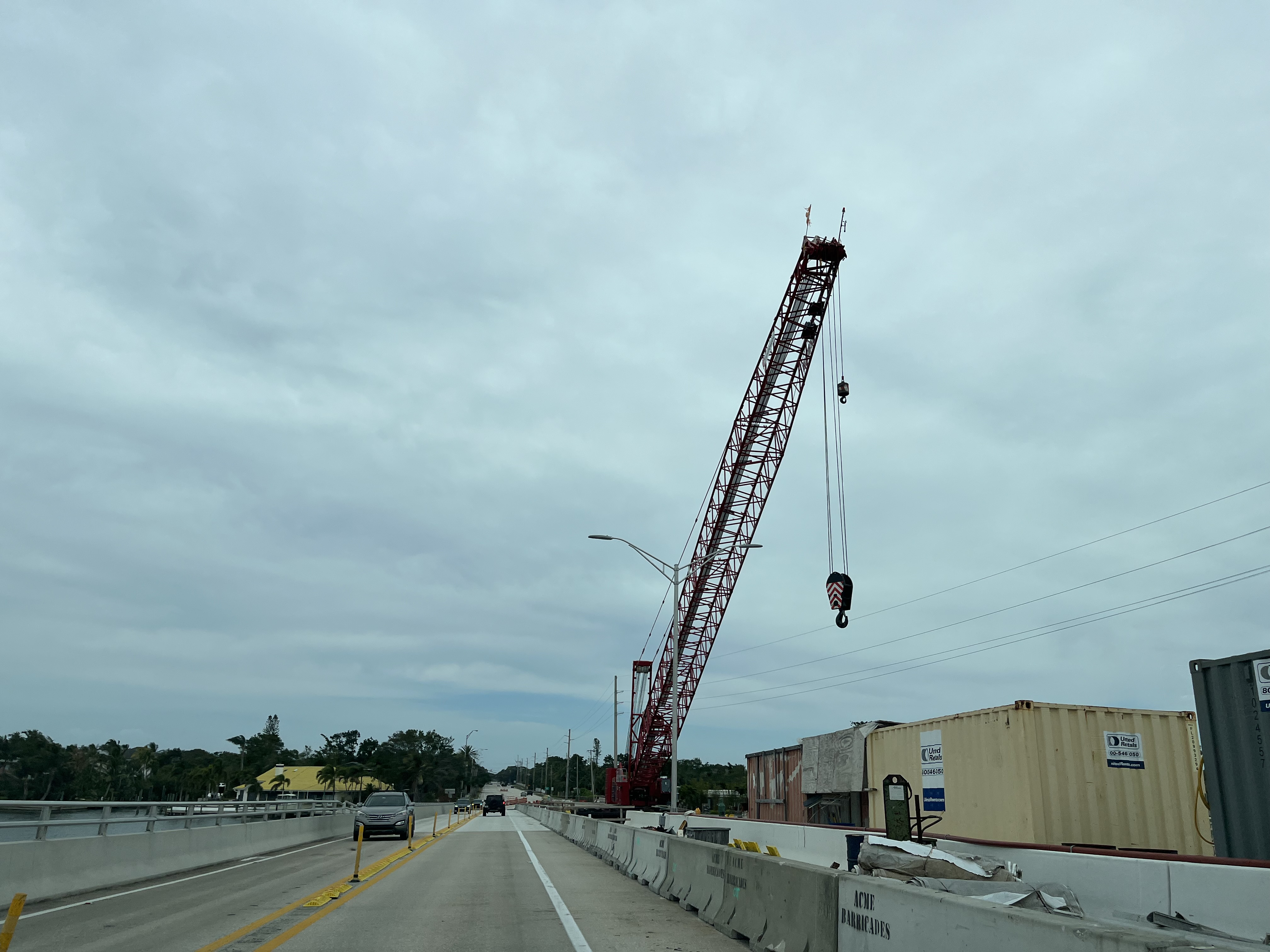
Repairs on the bridge in 2025

The project has been criticized because of the lengthy and "slow moving" process.

== Controversy ==
Citizens are petitioning the government to add concrete barriers to protect the bicycle lanes after a child was killed crossing the bridge. The Florida DOT insists the 38 foot width each direction is too narrow for two travel lanes and a protected bicycle lane.
