= Florida State Road 607 =

State highway in Florida, United States

State Road 607
- Emerson Avenue

Route information
- Maintained by FDOT
- Length: 4.925 mi (7.926 km)

Major junctions
- South end: SR 614 near Lakewood Park
- North end: SR 606 in Florida Ridge

Location
- Country: United States
- State: Florida

Highway system
- Florida State Highway System; Interstate; US; State; Former; Pre‑1945; Toll; Scenic
← SR 606	→ SR 608

State Road 607 (SR 607) is a state highway that extends 4.9 miles (7.9 km) from its southern terminus (an intersection with SR 614 near Lakewood Park) to SR 606 in Florida Ridge. A north–south road in northern St. Lucie County and southern Indian River County, it is locally known as Emerson Avenue throughout its route.

== Route description ==
SR 607's north–south lanes pass through parts of Lakewood Park in St. Lucie County, before crossing into Florida Ridge in Indian River County.

== History ==
According to a 1960 map prepared by State Road Department (forerunner of the Florida Department of Transportation), Emerson Road shared its SR 607 designation with Indrio Road (present SR 614) and Kings Highway (present SR 713). At that time, Angle Road east of Kings Highway was signed State Road 607A.

The road originally ran 8.5 miles (13.7 km) long, extending into Indian River County along 27th Avenue to SR 60 in Vero Beach. This portion threads between residential developments and is an important commuter road for this growing section of the eastern coast of Florida.

Prior to 1978, SR 607 was a primary access road for the local orange groves, once the primary source of commerce of the region (and still a significant industry). Between 1978 and 1980, it served to "bridge the gap" between the incomplete Interstate 95 (SR 9) and Florida's Turnpike in Indian River and St. Lucie counties. Southbound motorists would exit I-95 at the temporary southern end at SR 60 (Osceola Boulevard/20th Street) west of Vero Beach, travel southward the length of SR 607, then right one mile (1.6 km) on SR 614 (Indrio Road) before going south the remaining 7.5 miles (12.1 km) on SR 713 (Kings Highway) to SR 70 (Okeechobee Road) and a trumpet interchange with the Turnpike in Fort Pierce.

== Major intersections ==
County	Location	mi	km	Destinations	Notes
	0.000	0.000	SR 614 (Indrio Road) to US 1 / I-95 / Florida's Turnpike	Southern terminus	
Lakewood Park	4.925	7.926	SR 606 (Oslo Road) to I-95 / US 1	Northern terminus	
1.000 mi = 1.609 km; 1.000 km = 0.621 mi
