= Candie's Foundation =

Defunct American non-profit organization

- Founded: June 2001
- Founder: Neil Cole
- Dissolved: 2017
- Type: Non-profit
- Website: candiesfoundation.org

The Candie's Foundation, founded by CEO of Iconic Group Neil Cole, was a non-profit organization promoting abstinence-only education through paid advertising campaigns. After facing public criticism over financial decisions and stigmatizing campaigns, the Candie's Foundation rebranded as TheNext.Org in May 2016, then ceased operations in 2017. In 2019, the founder of Candie's Foundation, Neil Cole, was charged with accounting fraud between 2013 and 2014.

== History ==
In 2001, Neil Cole, head of the fashion brand Candie's and an executive at Iconix Brand Group, founded The Candie's Foundation, in response to accusations that his clothing brand sexualized teenagers. The Candie's Foundation mission was to educate teenagers as to the risks and consequences of teen pregnancy.

The Candie's Foundation implemented national ad campaigns that discouraged teenagers from sexual activity. Fox News reports that the foundation "advocates for abstinence to prevent unwanted pregnancies." Actresses Jenny McCarthy and Hayden Panettiere, as well as teen mom Bristol Palin, have been paid "ambassadors" for the foundation. In 2009, Bristol Palin was paid $262,500 to participate in the campaign. More than 20 celebrities have been hired to participate in Candie's Foundation PSA campaigns, including Vanessa Hudgens, Usher, Macy Gray, Rihanna, Ciara, Amar'e Stoudemire, Ashanti Douglas, Lupe Fiasco, Jennifer Hudson, Michael Sorrentino, Kenneth Cole, Matt Garza, Hilary Duff, Ashley Tisdale, Ashlee Simpson, Fall Out Boy, Vanessa Minnillo, Natasha Bedingfield, Fergie, Elizabeth Berkley, Bruno Mars, Taylor Swift, and Destiny's Child.

The Candie's Foundation was an operating foundation rather than a grant-making foundation. However, the foundation has received criticism for spending more money on spokespeople than on grants to teen pregnancy health and counseling clinics.

After investigations in 2003, Neil Cole and Candie's reached an agreement to settle charges of fraudulent accounting practices brought against it by the Securities and Exchange Commission. Neil Cole agreed to pay $75,000 to settle charges without admitting or denying wrongdoing. In 2019, Cole was again charged with 10 criminal counts, including conspiracy, securities fraud, making false filings with the SEC and conspiracy to destroy records.

== Campaigns ==
Celebrities that have participated in the campaigns include Hayden Panettiere, Beyoncé, Ciara, Fergie, Jenny McCarthy, Vanessa Minnillo, Ashley Tisdale, Hilary Duff, Ashlee Simpson, Fall Out Boy, Usher, Rachel Bilson, Bristol Palin, Teddy Geiger, Diggy Simmons, Lea Michele and Vanessa Hudgens.

== Event to prevent ==
Each year The Candie's Foundation hosted the Event to Prevent to raise awareness about teen pregnancy in the United States. The event brought together leaders in the media, entertainment, business, and political worlds. The event raised money to support their marketing and advertising campaigns, and honored individuals who helped advance the Foundation's message.

== Criticism ==
The organization has come under criticism. From the $1,242,476 donated by the public, $35,000 went to charities and a $262,500 paycheck was given to Bristol Palin for her role as an ambassador for their teen pregnancy prevention campaign in 2009, who again became pregnant out-of-wedlock to an unconfirmed father in 2015.

In 2013, a group of young mothers, including Gloria Malone and Natasha Vianna, petitioned Candie's to eliminate stigma, sexism, and racism from their teen pregnancy prevention campaigns and requested a meeting with Cole. While he publicly responded to their national campaign, he refused to speak to or meet with the young women.
