= Vero Beach Outlets =

Outlet mall in Vero Beach, Florida, US

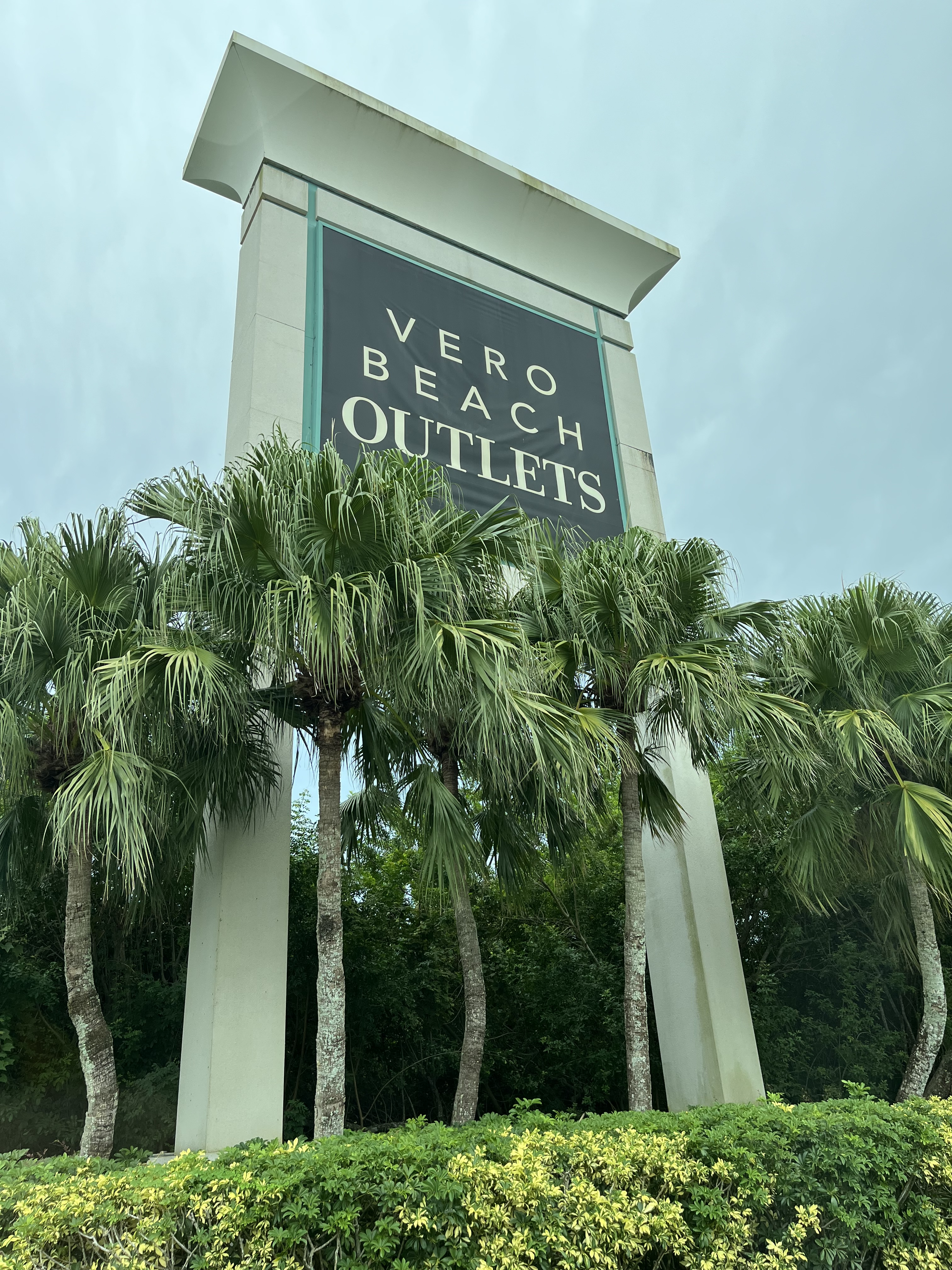
- The mall's signage in 2025
- Location: Vero Beach, Florida, United States
- Coordinates: 27.6356579°N 80.5212514°W
- Address: 1824 94th Dr, Vero Beach, Florida
- Opened: October 22, 1994; 32 years ago
- Previous names: Horizon Outlet Center, Prime Outlets at Vero Beach, Tanger Outlets Vero Beach, Outlets at Vero Beach
- Developer: Horizon Outlets
- Owner: Simpson Organization, Inc.
- Num. of stores: 45+
- Floor area: 340,000 sq ft (32,000 m^{2})
- Floors: 1
- Website: https://verobeachoutlets.com/

Vero Beach Outlets is an outdoor outlet mall in Vero Beach, Florida, United States. Opened in 1994 as Horizon Outlet Center, it expanded in 1995 and underwent a number of name and ownership changes since. The outlet mall consists of more than 50 stores. It is owned and managed by Simpson Organization Inc. The mall is located at the intersection of SR 60 and I-95.

== History ==
Horizon Group, an outlet mall developer based in Muskegon, Michigan, first announced plans to build a property in Vero Beach, Florida, in 1993. The company selected a site at the southwestern corner of I-95 and SR 60, with initial plans calling for approximately 40 stores in 150,000 square feet (14,000 m^{2}) of retail space, and planned to have the center opened by December 1994. By year's end, Horizon Group had begun submitting plans to the Florida Department of Community Affairs to review the site for possible habitats of protected species. In addition, the company stated plans to expand the mall by about 147,500 square feet (13,700 m^{2}) by 1996, due to interest from prospective retailers.

Indian River County agreed to rezone the 115-acre (47 ha) site for commercial use in March 1994, with ground breaking starting soon afterward. Horizon Group confirmed in August 1994 that the outlet mall would include Casual Corner, Corning, and London Fog among its tenants. Building costs were estimated at $7,500,000. The mall opened for business as Horizon Outlet Center on October 22, 1994. Upon opening, the mall's largest tenant was a 12,100-square-foot (1,120 m^{2}) Levi Strauss & Co. outlet store. The mall's decor consisted of a pink and turquoise motif described by Mike Shambora of the Indian River Press Journal as "Mediterranean".

== After opening ==
Spiegel opened a 25,000-square-foot (2,300 m^{2}) store at the mall in May 1995, as the first portion of an expansion.

In 1998, Horizon Group merged with Prime Retail, and the mall was renamed to Prime Outlets at Vero Beach. Due to financial complications stemming from the merger, which included management of another outlet mall in Minnesota which Prime Retail reported was under-performing, ownership was briefly transferred to John Hancock Financial. Tanger Inc. then bought the property from John Hancock Financial in September 2002, renaming it a second time to Tanger Outlet Vero Beach. Tanger sold the mall to Stoltz Management one year later, at which point it was renamed Outlets at Vero Beach. By 2012, it was renamed again to Vero Beach Outlets. The Simpson Organization acquired the mall a year later.

In 2018, improvements for the shopping center were revealed including the addition of four restaurants and two new stores, as well as improvements to walkways. A new Design Within Reach store also opened, making for their first location in an outlet shopping center. Michael Kors opened a store at the mall in the same year.
