= Florida State Road 606 =

State road in Indian River County, Florida

State Road 606

Route information
- Maintained by FDOT
- Length: 7.258 mi (11.681 km)
- Existed: 2026–present

Major junctions
- West end: I-95 (SR 9) near Vero Beach
- SR 607 in Florida Ridge
- East end: US 1 (SR 5) in Florida Ridge

Location
- Country: United States
- State: Florida

Highway system
- Florida State Highway System; Interstate; US; State; Former; Pre‑1945; Toll; Scenic
← SR 600	→ SR 607

State Road 606 (SR 606), or Oslo Road, is a 7.25-mile (11.67 km) state road in southern Indian River County, Florida. Starting in the west of the county at and interchange with Interstate 95 (I-95), the road ends at US-1 (SR 5) in Florida Ridge. In August 2023, a $95 million (2023 USD) project known as the "Oslo Exchange" began to connect the road with a partial-cloverleaf exit at I-95. The project was completed on October 5, 2026.

On September 14, 2026, the highway was redesignated State Road 606 (SR 606) when the roadway was transferred to the Florida Department of Transportation (FDOT).

Route 15 of the GoLine also services the road.

== Route description ==
SR 606 begins at I-95 near Vero Beach South, at a partial cloverleaf interchange. The road continues eastward through southwestern Indian River County, intersecting 82nd Avenue (CR 619), 58th Avenue (CR 613), and 43rd Avenue (CR 611).

Signage seen near Oslo Rd and 66th Ave in October 2026

After having an intersection that serves as the northern terminus for SR 607, SR 606 continues eastward in Florida Ridge and ends on US-1.

== History ==
=== Pre-designation ===
The settlement of Oslo, Florida (now located in present-day Florida Ridge) was first settled by Europeans in the area around Oslo Road and US-1 around 1883, notably by the Helseth, Hallstrom, and Gifford families. When the settlement established a postal stop in 1898, the local residents were required to choose a 4-letter name for the settlement. Ole Olsen (O.O.) Helseth, the community’s de facto leader, chose to name it Oslo, honoring his family’s Norwegian heritage. When deciding to build a road in the settlement, the local settlers chose the name Oslo Road, after the settlement’s name.

=== I-95 Interchange ===
On August 14, 2023, work began to create a new $95.7 million (2023 USD) I-95 exit for SR 606 (Oslo Road), designated Exit 143. Oslo Road was widened from two to four lanes between 58th avenue and I-95. A partial cloverleaf interchange was constructed for the interchange with I-95. The previous bridge over I-95 was rebuilt, and 82nd avenue (County Road 619) was realigned to make room for the partial cloverleaf ramps.

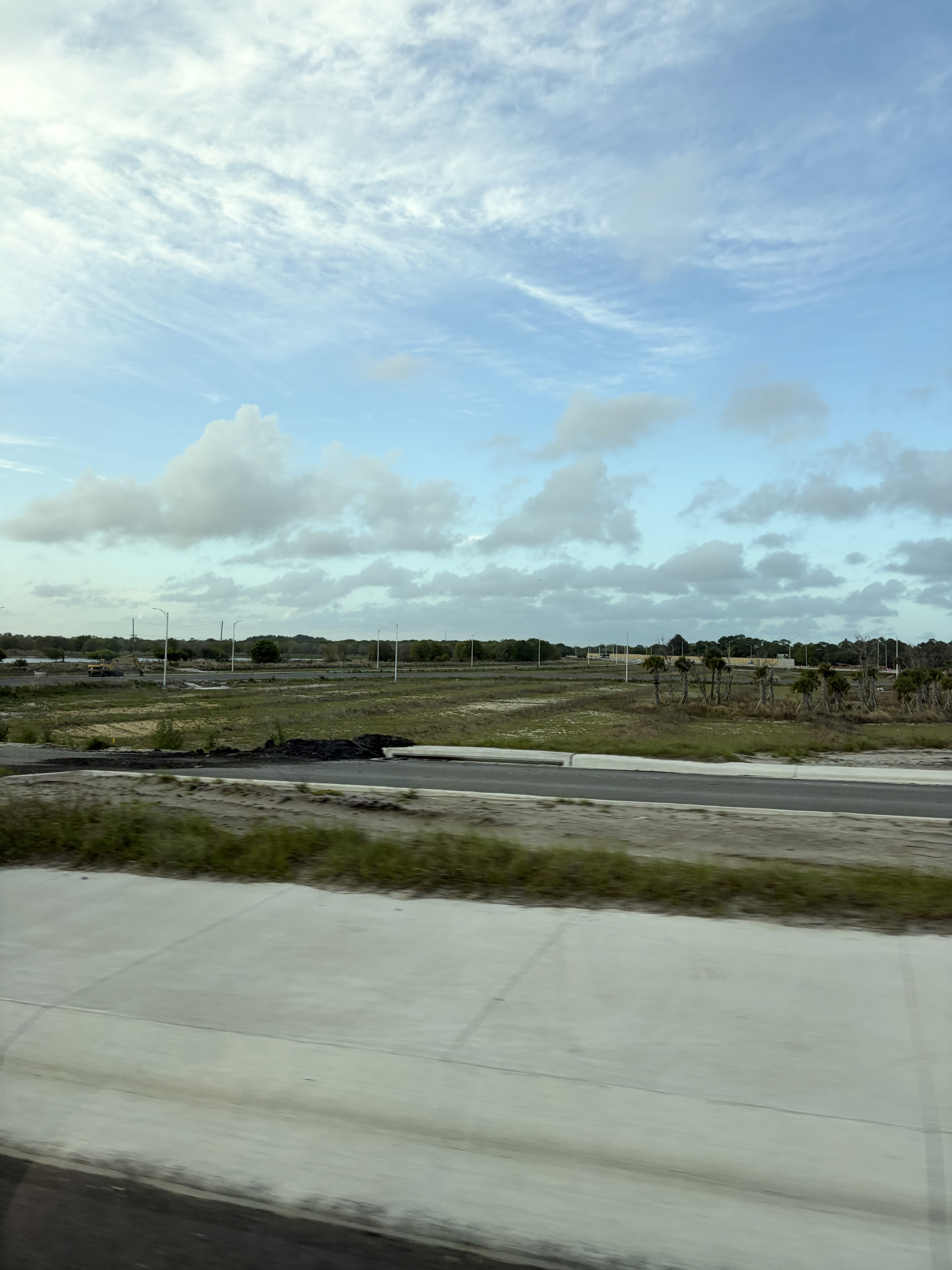
Work on the Oslo Road I-95 exit in March 2026

An article by Hometown News in November 2024 stated that the project was “making progress", and that ramps for the I-95 interchange were starting to "take shape".

As part of the Oslo Exchange project, on September 14, 2026, the highway was redesignated State Road 606 (SR 606) when the roadway was transferred to the Florida Department of Transportation (FDOT).

==== Opening ====
Exit signage seen from I-95 in October 2026

According to the Treasure Coast Palm, the project was initially projected to be finished by summer 2027. However, the project ran significantly ahead of schedule, and the new interchange at I-95 opened on October 5, 2026, nearly 400 days ahead of schedule. The widening project to widen SR 606 from two to four lanes was also opened on the same day.

== Major intersections ==
The entire route is in Indian River County.

Location	mi	km	Destinations	Notes
	0.00	0.00	I-95 (SR 9) – Daytona Beach, West Palm Beach	Western terminus; Exit 143 on I-95; partial cloverleaf interchange opened on October 5, 2026.
	0.82	1.32	CR 619 north (82nd Avenue)	
Vero Beach South	3.51	5.65	CR 613 north (58th Avenue)	
Vero Beach South–Florida Ridge line	4.53	7.29	CR 611 (43rd Avenue) to SR 614	
Florida Ridge	5.54	8.92	SR 607 south (Emerson Avenue)	Northern terminus of SR 607
Florida Ridge	7.64	12.30	CR 605 (Old Dixie Highway)	
Florida Ridge	7.79	12.54	US 1	Eastern terminus
1.000 mi = 1.609 km; 1.000 km = 0.621 mi

== Controversy ==
As the Oslo Road corridor transitioned from a rural roadway to a commercial and suburban artery, the highway faced community scrutiny regarding traffic safety. The intersection of Oslo Road and Citrus Springs Boulevard became of particular local concern following a 2018 fatal collision between a passenger vehicle and a commercial tractor-trailer, and a 2020 hit-and-run pedestrian fatality.

In response to these accidents, residents of the adjacent Citrus Springs community launched advocacy efforts and lobbied county officials for the installation of a traffic signal; however, as of 2026, no permanent signal infrastructure has been approved or installed at the intersection.

In addition, the construction of the interchange with I-95 brought significant local pushback, due to increased projected traffic volume and freight traffic.
