= Victoria Janashvili =

American fashion photographer

Victoria Janashvili (Nelson)
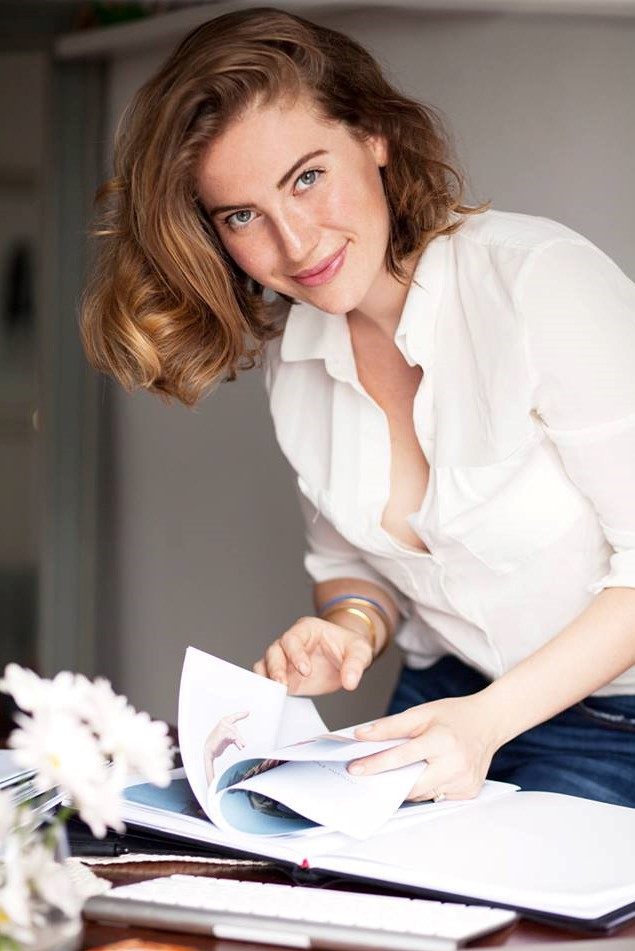
- Janashvili in 2015
- Occupations: Photographer, public speaker, entrepreneur

Victoria Nelson (Janashvili) is an American fashion photographer, book author, and entrepreneur.

== Early life and education ==
Victoria Janashvili was born in St Petersburg, Russia. She moved to London, UK at the age of 17. She attended the London College of Fashion and moved to New York City in 2009.

== Photography career ==
Janashvili shot multiple advertising campaigns for fashion houses such as Badgley Mischka, Guess, MiracleSuit, Macy's, Lord and Taylor, Target and many others.

She has shot covers and spreads for GQ, Cosmopolitan, Elle, L'Officiel, Maxim and Esquire magazines worldwide.

Her editorial published in the January 2012 issue of PLUS Model Magazine which highlighted the disparities between real women and runway models was widely acclaimed in the media. Since then Victoria created many more images featuring plus size models that made headlines all over the world. Janashvili is also known for her expert appearances and features on television such as MTV, ABC News, FOX news, Canal + France and many others. Janashvili has also made guest appearances at the ABC's Today Show as well as in a TV shows Real Housewives of Miami and Curvy Girls on Nuvo TV.

== Activism ==
In 2015 Janashvili published a highly controversial art book, Curves, that was widely critically acclaimed. The book features semi nude portraits of 70 women of various ethnic and social backgrounds along with stories about self discovery and empowerment. The book helped change the landscape of modern fashion casting.

== Entrepreneurship ==
In 2017 Janashvili co-founded a sustainable fashion company, ChicCartel. The company is an incubator for local female designers making sustainable fashion.
