= Badgley Mischka =

American fashion label

- Type: Private
- Industry: Fashion industry, textiles
- Founded: 1988 (38 years ago) in Beverly Hills, California, US
- Founders: Mark Badgley; James Mischka
- Number of locations: 1 store (2018)
- Parent: Titan Industries
- Website: www.badgleymischka.com

Badgley Mischka (/ˌbædʒli ˈmɪʃkə/ BAJ-lee MISH-kə) is an American fashion label designed by Mark Badgley and James Mischka. Their collections are said to be largely influenced by the style of the glamour of 1940s Hollywood while remaining simple and streamlined.

== History ==
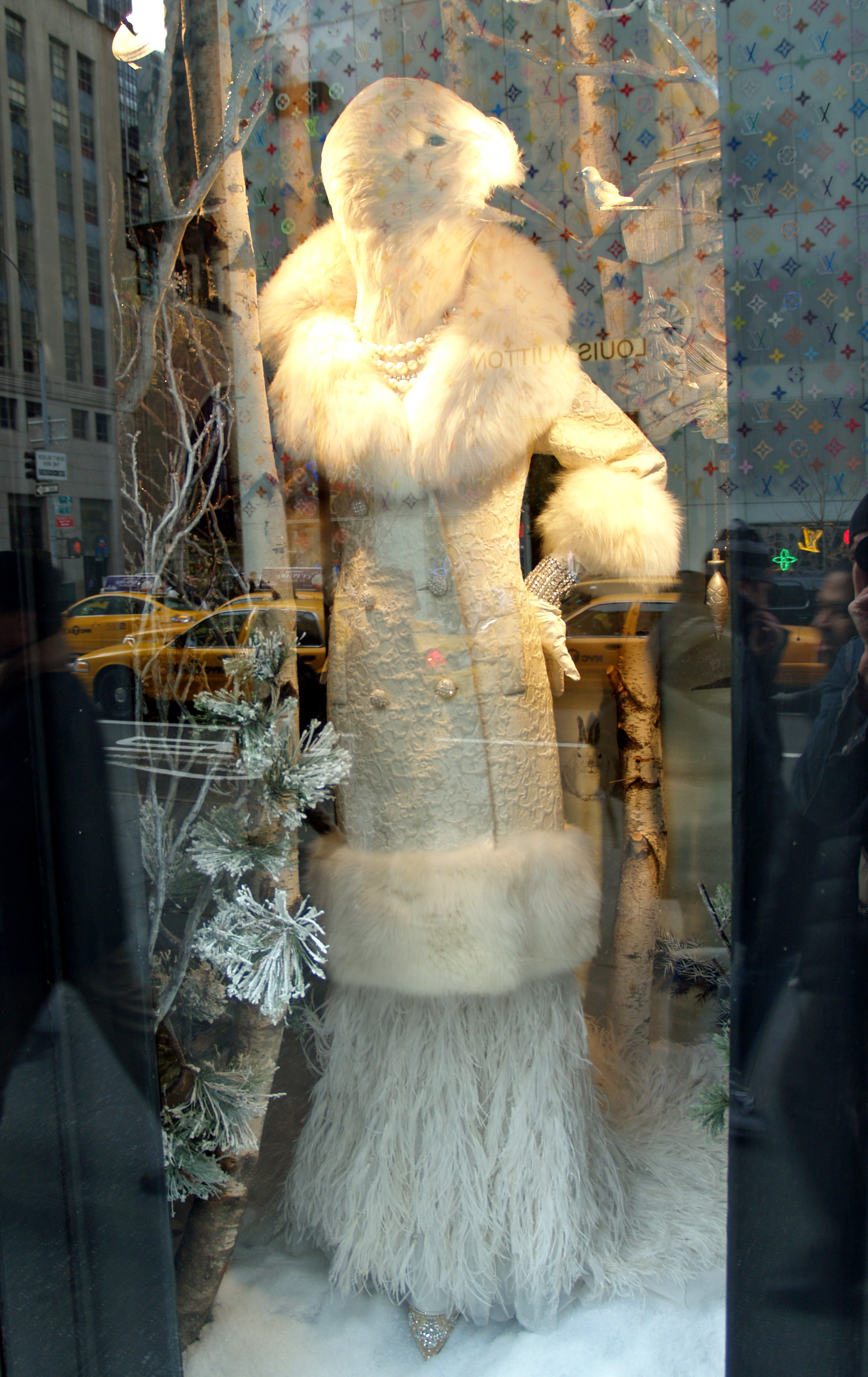
A Badgley Mischka fur coat on display in the window of Bergdorf Goodman's Fifth Avenue store.

James Mischka began at Rice University as a biomedical engineering major and ultimately graduated with degrees in art history and managerial studies in 1985. Badgley and Mischka met at Parsons School of Design in Manhattan. The two launched the label Badgley Mischka in 1988, though their bridal business launched in 1996. In 1989, they won the Fashion Institute of Technology's second annual Mouton-Cadet Young Designer Award, presented by Philippine de Rothschild.

In 1992, Badgley Mischka was acquired by Escada; Badgley and Mischka retained creative control and a financial stake in the brand.

In 2004, Escada sold Badgley Mischka to Candie's (later renamed Iconix Brand Group). In 2006, the brand launched licensed eyewear, handbags and cold-weather accessories lines, along with its first fragrance. It also introduced bridge sportswear, shoes, wedding gowns and bridesmaid dresses through other licensing agreements. By 2020, Badgley Mischka was running more than ten licensing deals.

In September 2006, Badgley Mischka announced that Sharon Stone would replace Mary-Kate and Ashley Olsen as the brand's spokesperson. Melania Trump is a regular client of the label.

In 2017, Iconix sold Badgley Mischka to Mark Badgley, James Mischka, and Titan Industries for $16 million in cash. Still in 2017, the label launched its home furnishings collection. In 2018, the label signed a beauty license with TPR Holdings LLC. In 2024, the label launched its first prestige fragrances.

== Gallery ==
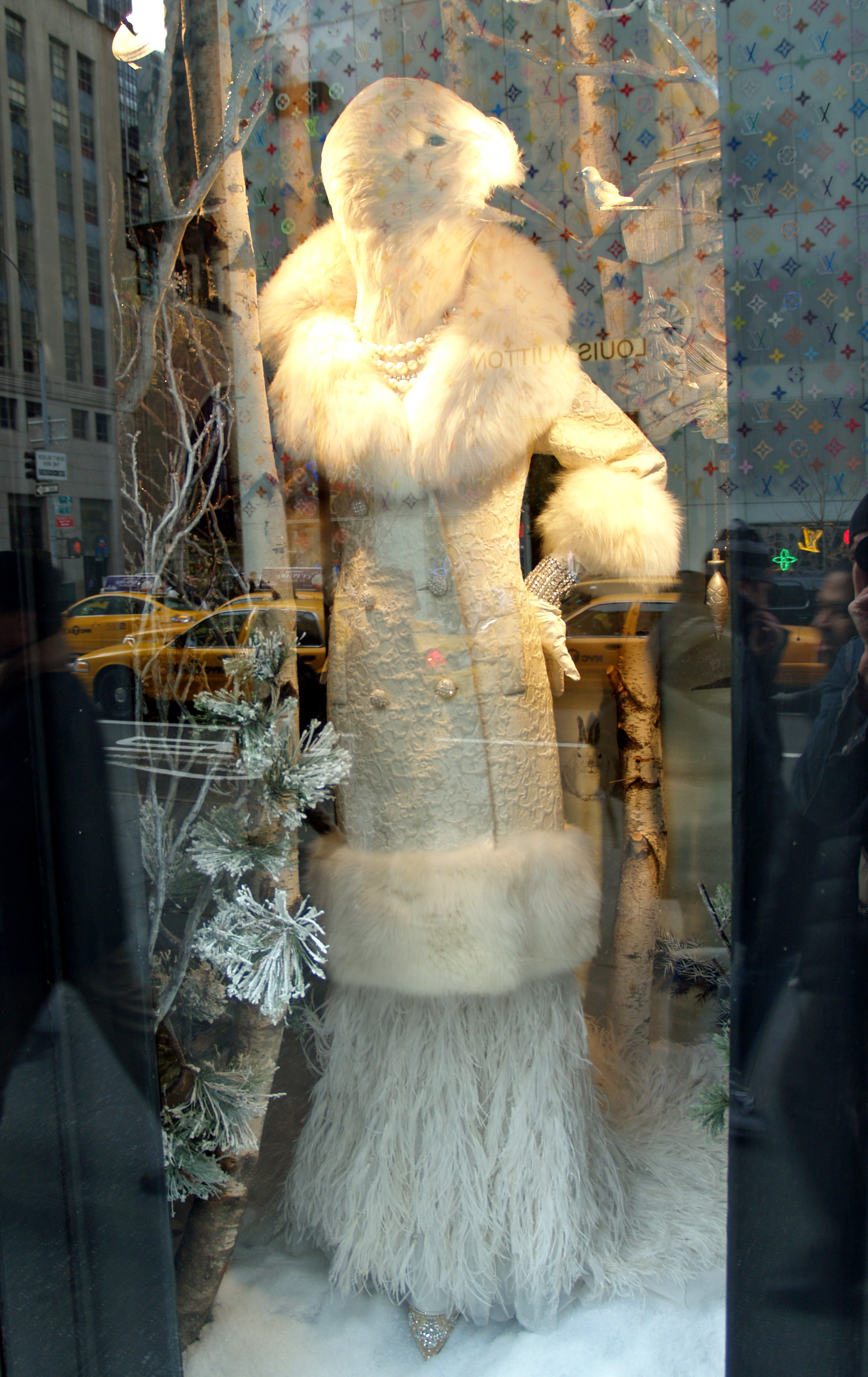

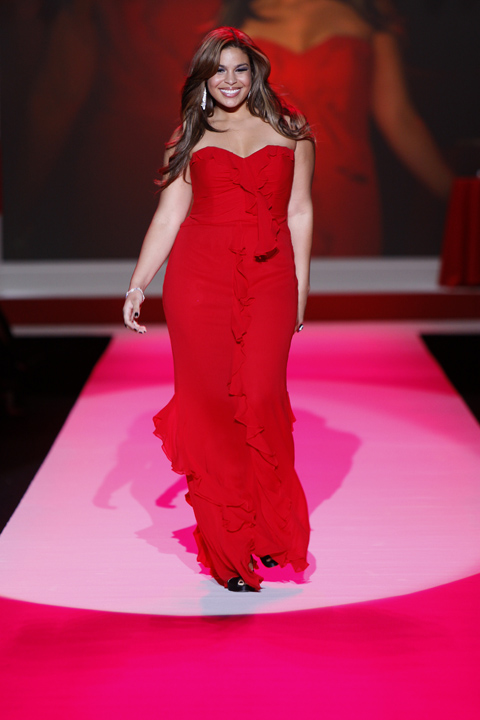

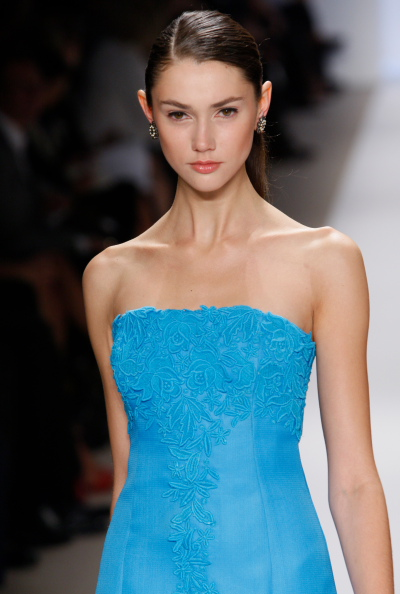

== See also ==
- List of fashion designers
