= Londontown Manufacturing Company, Inc. =

Historic building in Maryland, USA

- U.S. National Register of Historic Places
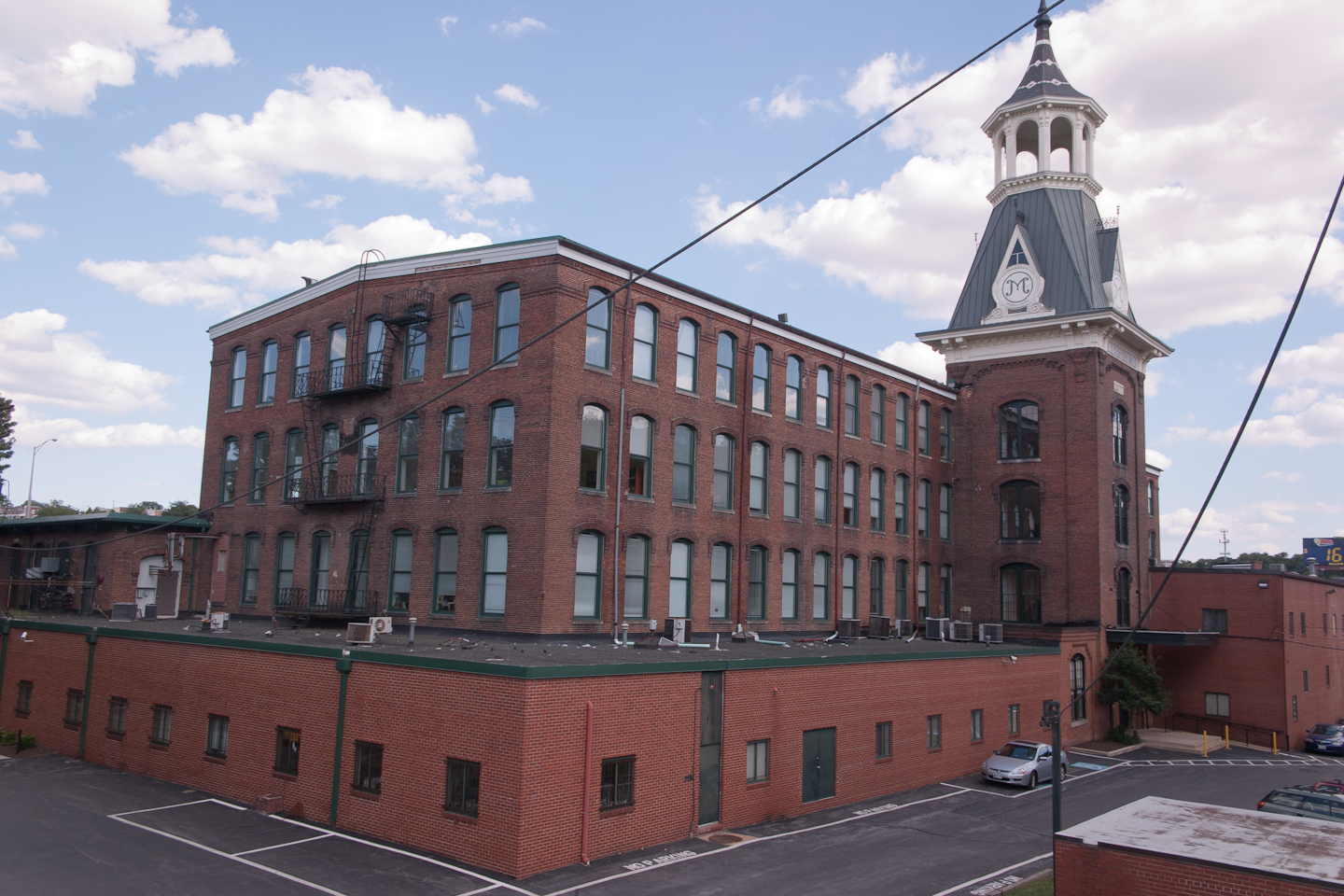
- Londontown Manufacturing Company, Inc., August 2011

- Location within Baltimore Location within Maryland Location within the United States
- Location: 3600 Clipper Mill Road, south of Union Avenue, Baltimore, Maryland
- Coordinates: 39°19′53″N 76°38′34″W
- Area: 6 acres (2.4 ha)
- Built: 1877
- NRHP reference No.: 73002188
- Added to NRHP: January 12, 1973

Londontown Manufacturing Company, Inc., also known earlier as the Meadow Mill of the old Woodberry Manufacturing Company is a historic cotton mill industrial complex located at Baltimore, Maryland, United States. It is a four-story, Italianate red brick structure that features a square tower structure with a truncated spire-like roof having an open bell tower cupola. It sits on the west bank of the Jones Falls stream which runs north to south, parallel to the elevated Jones Falls Expressway (Interstate 83 in Maryland, built 1960–1962).

It is sited between the Woodberry neighborhood on the western heights with historic Druid Hill Park perched above (one of the nation's oldest and largest urban parks). To the east is the Hampden residential community. Both twin neighborhoods are on steep valley slopes with many original thick-walled stone and brick millworkers houses with pitched roofs and dormer windows for second floor or attics of the 1800s, along with later versions of typical early 20th century Baltimore style rowhouses, plus some century-and-half old wood-frame or shingled cottages with tiny front yards.

It is surrounded by numerous other massive stone and brick large mills and factory complexes (similar to New England typical mill towns) up and down the often frequently flooding stream, dating to the early 19th century and the beginnings of the Industrial Revolution for making flour, cotton canvas duck cloth and various foundries and machine shops which were active into the mid-20th century.

The distinctive Victorian era Meadow Mill with its tall cupola tower is a well-known scenic landmark, which was erected in 1877 as one of five mills which comprised the old Woodberry Manufacturing Company. It was originally intended for the manufacture of seine twines.

It was home for three decades to the Londontown Manufacturing Company, Inc., founded 1922–1923 by Israel Myers for making what became the world-famous London Fog outerwear / all-weather rain coats. The headquarters offices were located here since the early 1950s with a small modern single-story brick annex for company offices built wrapping around the first floor northwest corner of the original 1870s mill factory structure. Londontown and President Israel Myers offices were located here along with the older four-stories tall factory building. An additional gray concrete walled two-stories high warehouse annex was added in the 1960s on the south side of the mill factory with loading trucks/trailer bays on its east and west sides for shipping plus an additional parking lot further south alongside the Jones Falls stream. The complex was heavily damaged again during the floods resulting from Hurricane/Tropical Storm "Agnes" in June 1972 which devastated the Middle Atlantic states / Chesapeake Bay region. This complex remained the center of "London Fog" production up until 1976, prior to its move 15 miles further northwest to then rural (now suburban) southern Carroll County, Maryland in Eldersburg, Maryland on newly laid-out Londontowne Boulevard. However some industrial manufacturing work remained here at Meadow Mill along the Jones Falls stream for another decade until 1988.

Londontown Manufacturing Company, Inc. in its old Meadow Mill buildings / campus was listed on the National Register of Historic Places in 1973, three years before its move to Eldersburg, Carroll County.
