= Umbro =

British athletic equipment company

- Trade name: Umbro
- Type: Subsidiary
- Industry: Sports; Textile
- Founded: 23 May 1924; 102 years ago in Wilmslow, England
- Founder: Harold & Wallace Humphreys
- Headquarters: Manchester, England
- Area served: Worldwide
- Key people: Anthony Little (Managing Director)
- Products: Footballs, football kits, goalkeeper gloves, boots, sportswear, rugby kit
- Number of employees: 4
- Parent: Iconix Brand Group
- Website: umbro.com umbro.com.au umbro.co.uk

Umbro is an English sports equipment manufacturer founded in 1924 in Wilmslow, Cheshire, and based in Manchester. They specialise in football and rugby sportswear featuring their "double diamond" logo. Umbro products are sold in over 100 countries.

The business was started by brothers Harold and Wallace Humphreys. The name is a portmanteau of um, from Humphreys, and bro from brothers. Since 2012, the marque is a subsidiary of U.S-brand management company Iconix Brand Group.

== History ==
=== Beginning and expansion ===
Inspired by the rapidly growing interest in football witnessed nationwide, the business started at the family's pub, once owned by the parents of Harold Humphreys and his brother Wallace, who founded Humphreys Brothers Limited in 1924, initially working out of a small cupboard in the pub before moving to a workshop in Wilmslow. The company name was changed in the same year to "Umbro" and is a quasi-portmanteau inspired by Humphreys Brothers. Umbro's kit debut was in the 1934 FA Cup final, when both teams – Manchester City and Portsmouth – wore kits designed and manufactured by the company. Other notably successful teams supplied by Umbro during the 1930s and 40s were Sheffield United, Preston North End, Manchester United, Tottenham Hotspur and Blackpool.

In 1952, the British team at the Summer Olympics wore Umbro kits, tailored for the needs of their individual sports. Umbro would supply kits for the British Olympics team for the next 20 years. In 1955, Umbro introduced their first replica football kit, the 'Sportswear Xmas Pack'. The kit, designed for young boys, included a matching shirt, shorts, and socks. In 1957, Umbro entered the tennis market, producing sports clothing in collaboration with player Ted Tinling. This collaboration extended for three decades. Another sportsman who collaborated with Umbro was Manchester United manager Matt Busby, in 1959.

=== Football pinnacle ===
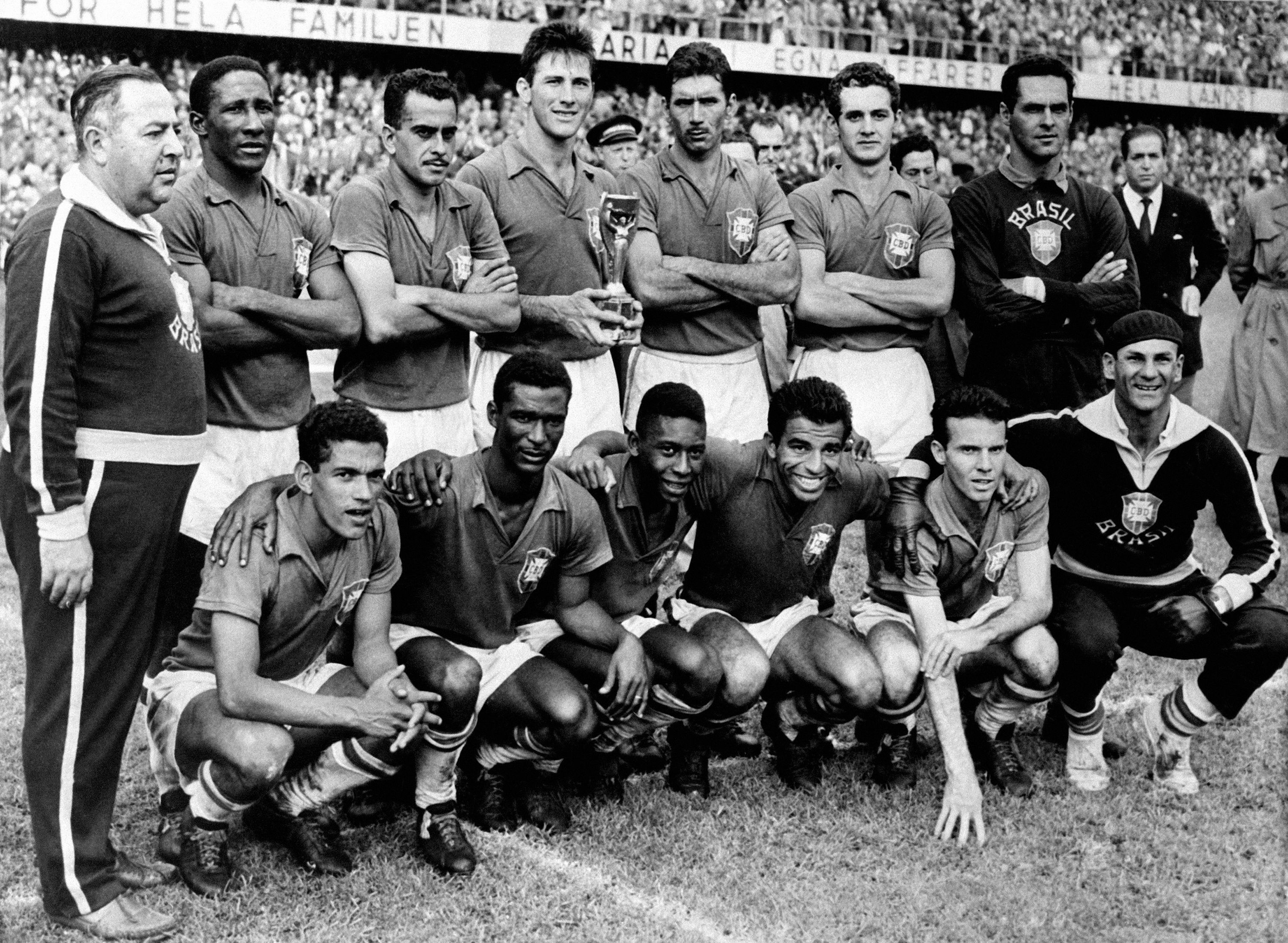
Brazil won its first FIFA World Cup in 1958 wearing Umbro kits

Brazil became the first FIFA World Cup champion to wear kits by Umbro in 1958. Two years later, Manchester United Scottish player Denis Law signed an exclusive agreement with the brand, becoming the first footballer to be sponsored by Umbro. The England national team won its only title in 1966 wearing kits by Umbro (the deal had been signed in 1954). Of the 16 teams that competed, 15 wore kit manufactured by Umbro, the only exception being the USSR. By the late 1960s, 85% of British football teams wore kits manufactured by the company, including Celtic, the first British team to win a European Cup in 1967. Liverpool F.C. won the first four of their six European Cups while wearing Umbro kits, in 1977, 1978, 1981 and 1984.

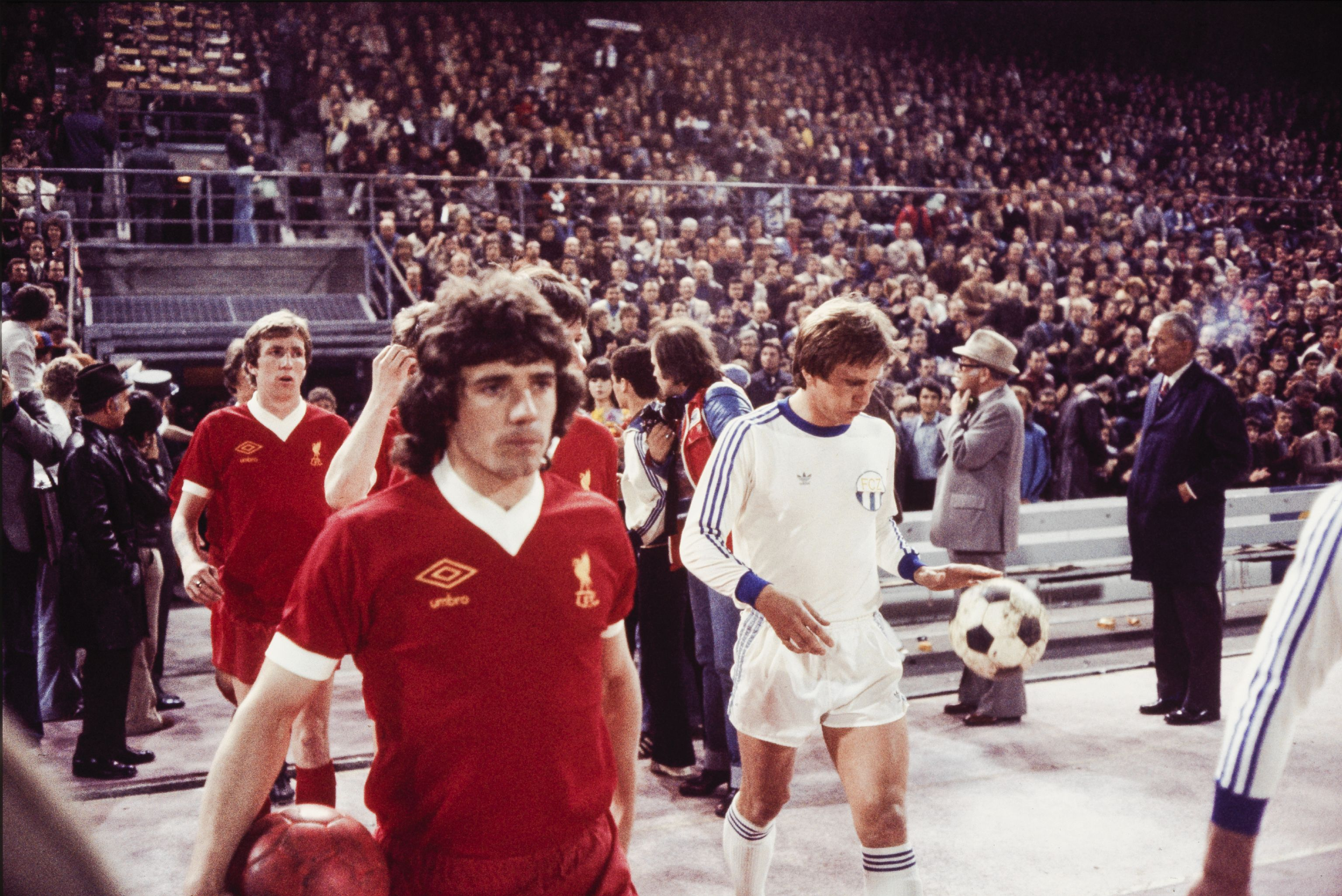
Liverpool F.C. players (Kevin Keegan the nearest pictured) in Umbro kits prior to a game in 1977

After more than a decade wearing Admiral kits, the England national team signed with Umbro again in 1984. In 1986, Umbro began to manufacture its own football boots. The company added footballers Alan Shearer and Michael Owen to its list of sponsored athletes.

Looking back at heritage outfits of the 1950s, Umbro designed an oversized, baggy silhouette kit and took a big opportunity to debut the radical new look for Tottenham Hotspur at the 1991 FA Cup final, in Paul Gascoigne's final match for the club. Although the kit was initially ridiculed in the British press, it quickly gained popularity after Tottenham's victory and Umbro rolled out their looser design for other clubs including Ajax, Inter Milan and Celtic in the 1991/92 season. Rival manufacturer Adidas also decided to make a looser design inspired by Umbro for Arsenal. Within two seasons, almost all kit manufacturers worldwide had abandoned the older slim-fitting design for its club and national team kits. This included the England team with Umbro releasing an updated kit in February 1993 which at the time was the most expensive kit deal in history.

In 1994, Brazil won its fourth FIFA World Cup title in the 1994 FIFA World Cup and club teams AFC Ajax (in 1995), and Manchester United (in 1999) obtained the UEFA Champions League and the Intercontinental Cup, in Tokyo, all of them wearing Umbro kits. Umbro was the official sports manufacturer of the English FA Cup and official sponsor of The FA, being the exclusive supplier of balls to the body's leagues.

=== Losses and Nike agreement ===
After the company's golden decade, Umbro lost its kit deals with Everton in 2000, Manchester United in 2002 and Chelsea in 2005, after already having lost deals with other big European clubs.

In the United States, Umbro was the majority owner (94%) of United Soccer Leagues, the parent organisation for North America's lower division men's soccer (tiers two through four in the American Soccer Pyramid), and the second tier women's league (W-League) and youth league (Super Y-League). During the 2009 USL First Division season, the Carolina RailHawks, Charleston Battery, Vancouver Whitecaps, Rochester Rhinos, Austin Aztex, and Puerto Rico Islanders all wore Umbro kits. During the 2012 USLPro season, the Dayton Dutch Lions wore Umbro.

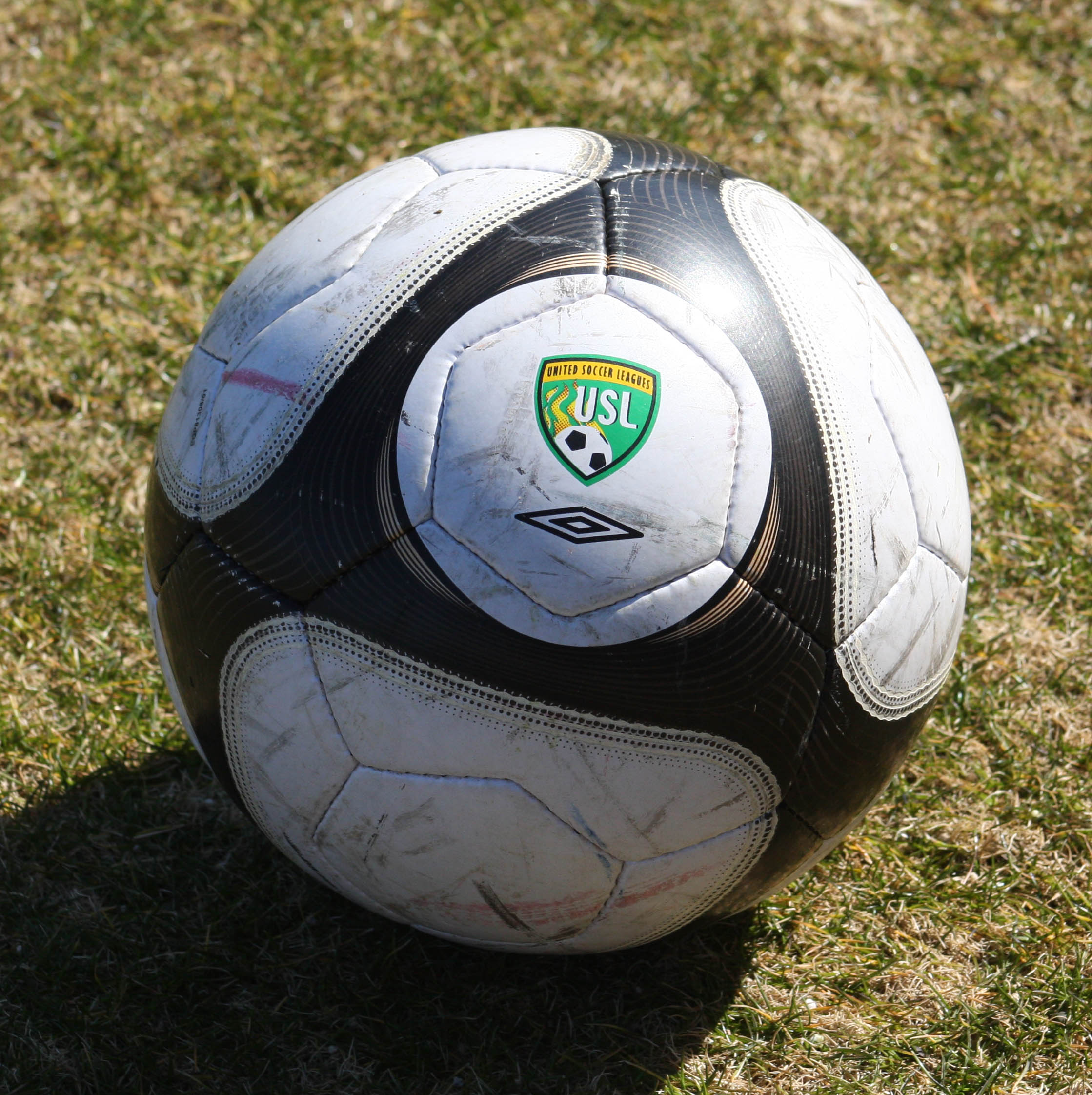
Umbro Dynamis match ball used in the United Soccer League for the 2009–10 season

In October 2007, JJB Sports bought a 10.1% stake in Umbro in a move to protect its stake in the market for England football shirts. Then on 23 October 2007, it was announced Umbro had agreed to be bought out by Nike in a deal worth £285 million, the equivalent of 193p per share. The Umbro board recommended to its shareholders they vote in favour of the approach, as it offered a very competitive price for the business. Umbro's share price at the time of the offer was close to 130p. The deal was approved by regulators in December 2007 and concluded in February 2008. With the objective of revitalising the brand, Umbro launched the "Tailored by England" lines. As of 4 June 2009, Umbro signed a deal with Manchester City to supply kits for the team. Wearing Umbro kits, Manchester City won their first major trophy in 34 years.

In 2010, Umbro became sponsor of reformed American team New York Cosmos to be its exclusive kit supplier. In May 2012, Nike reported that it would be selling Umbro (along with Cole Haan) to focus on their sports brands, including Nike, Converse, Hurley and Air Jordan. In September 2012, The FA announced that future England kits would be manufactured by Nike, ending a near 60-year period of supplying England kits.

=== Iconix Brand Group ===
In October 2012, Nike announced that it had agreed with Iconix Brand Group to sell Umbro for US$225 million. The acquisition was completed in December 2012. In February 2014, it was announced that Umbro would supply Everton from the start of the 2014–15 football season. This was the first new club announcement since Iconix Brand Group bought Umbro, and was followed by the announcement of similar deals with Hull City and French clubs Lens and Nantes. On 9 June 2014, Derby County announced that their kits for the 2014–15 season would be made by Umbro. Later in 2014, Umbro announced deals to supply a number of teams, including the Serbia national football team, the Malawi national football team, Vasco da Gama and Grêmio.

In February 2015, Dutch Eredivisie champions PSV announced a new kit deal with Umbro, replacing PSV's previous deal with Nike, which had been in existence since 1994. The deal coincided with PSV's return to the UEFA Champions League after a six-year absence. In late April 2015, West Ham United announced a new five-year agreement with Umbro as the club's official technical partner. This agreement included creating a commemorative kit for the Hammers' final year in the historic Boleyn Ground. In early December 2015, German club 1. FC Nürnberg announced a long-term kit deal with Umbro as the club's official kit supplier, replacing Adidas. In May 2016, it was announced that Umbro had become the technical sponsor of Blackburn Rovers in a five-year deal. It would also return to making AFC Bournemouth's kit after two occasions in the 1970s and 1980s for the 2017–18 season.

In June 2017, seven-time German champion FC Schalke 04 announced a five-year deal with Umbro, replacing Adidas after 55 years. Also in December 2017, Umbro announced a deal with the Jamaica national team.

In Europe, Iconix holds a brand licensing agreement with Scottish company GL Dameck Ltd to produce Umbro clothing and products. On 25 March 2024, it was reported that GL Dameck had sublicensed the Umbro brand to Manchester-based Castore; the latter became the sole licensee for Umbro Professional Team Sports apparel, enabling them to distribute the Umbro brand across several key European markets.

== Products ==
Umbro currently focuses on football and rugby union equipment, with products such as kit (jerseys, shorts and socks), and boots, as well as manufacturing other clothing such as t-shirts and jackets.

Until the mid-1980s, the company manufactured only sports clothing, in particular football jerseys, shorts and socks, but had no footwear range. Eventually, in 1985, Umbro decided to introduce its first football boot into the Brazilian market. This design, cheaper than the products of existing boot brands such as Adidas, proved popular and went into mass production internationally two years later.

Umbro also manufactured a popular style of shorts that reached its peak in the United States in the late 1980s and early 1990s. They were made of nylon, had a drawstring waistband, and often came in bright colours. With the growth of youth soccer leagues in the U.S. in the 1980s, many youths, teens and young adults began wearing them as everyday clothing. At the height of the "Umbro fashion," other brands of football shorts, such as Adidas, Diadora, Hummel, Lotto and Mitre, also became popular. Its major competitors in this market include Reebok, Nike, Adidas, Puma and Lotto.

Other releases by Umbro include the Stealth boot, released in 2010 and worn by players such as Gaël Clichy and Phil Jagielka. The same year, the company released the GT, worn by then-Fulham striker Darren Bent. The company announced it as its lightest ever boot. This was succeeded by the GT II model. June 2011 saw the release of the Umbro Geometra Pro. In 2013, Umbro introduced to a new wave of releases that included the Speciali IV and the Geometra II.

Following the end of the Nike partnership, one of Umbro's first major product releases was the UX-1 shoe.
