= Mudd Jeans =

American women's clothing brand

Mudd
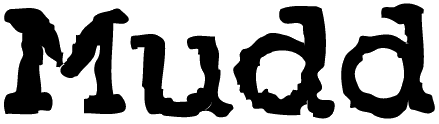
- Product type: Clothing
- Current owner: Iconix Brand Group
- Introduced: 1995; 31 years ago
- Markets: United States
- Website: muddjeans.com

Mudd Jeans (or simply Mudd) is a women's clothing brand marketed to adult and young women, founded by Dick Gilbert, George Fontini, Marty Weisfeld and Joanne Jacobsen in 1995. The brand became popular when they introduced their affordable flare-leg jeans, which was a popular style at the time.

The brand then expanded to a wider line of products, which currently includes jeans, dresses, jackets, shirts, t-shirts, blouses, tops, shorts, sweaters, and lingerie.

In 2006, Mudd was bought by Iconix Brand Group who owns various fashion and home brands. Under new ownership Mudd has continued to expand their brand and has introduced "Mudd Girls Move the World" which features real girls and their stories about helping out in their community. Until 1997, Mudd products could be found in the United States at Kohl's, JCPenney, Sears, Shoe Dept., Target, Famous Footwear, Bealls, Bon Ton, Dillard's, Carson Pirie Scott, and Stage. Mudd is also available in Panama and Mexico. Mudd later became an exclusive of Kohl's stores. As of 2 November 2022, Kohls.com reports that they no longer carry the Mudd brand.
