= Starter (clothing line) =

American clothing manufacturer

Starter, Inc.
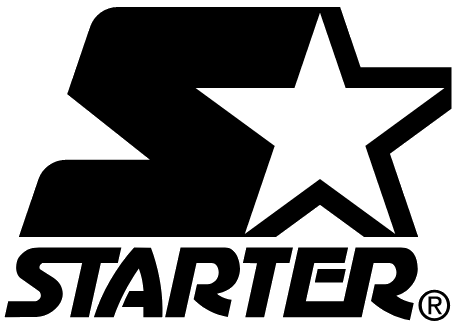
- Type: Subsidiary
- Industry: Textile
- Founded: 1971; 55 years ago
- Founder: David Beckerman
- Headquarters: New Haven, Connecticut, United States
- Area served: North America, Europe, Asia
- Products: Casual wear and accessories
- Parent: Iconix Brand Group
- Website: starter.com

Starter, Inc. is an American clothing manufacturer, focusing on major league sports teams. Starter's current licenses include MLB, NBA, NFL, and NHL teams. Non-sports agreements include a partnership with Coca-Cola.

Starter became notable in the early 1990s, with its licensed jackets of the main professional sports leagues in the US. Those jackets became iconic and a status symbol of that era. Apart from jackets, some of the products currently manufactured by Starter include casual wear (t-shirts, hoodies, sweatpants, leggings, socks) and accessories (bags, hats).

Since 2007, Starter has been a subsidiary company of the Iconix Brand Group, who acquired Starter from Nike, Inc.

== History ==
=== Rise and expansion ===
Starter was founded in New Haven, Connecticut by David Beckerman, a University of New Haven alumnus, to manufacture team uniforms for high school athletic programs.

In 1976, the company entered into non-exclusive licensing agreements with a number of professional sports leagues, paying royalties of 8–10% for the right to manufacture and market copies of professional athletic apparel. Its first retail product was a line of jackets emblazoned with the insignias of Major League Baseball teams. Soon the company expanded its licensed apparel line to include headgear, activewear and accessories.

By 1983, the company had entered licensing agreements with the NBA, the NFL, the NHL and the Canadian Football League (CFL). But the company's growth during this decade can also be attributed to an aggressive marketing strategy. Not only had the company made licensed sports apparel a fashion status symbol, it also created brand loyalty by making its "S and Star" logo a prominent part of the apparel's design. Starter innovatively placed its embroidered logo on jacket sleeves and on the back of baseball caps.

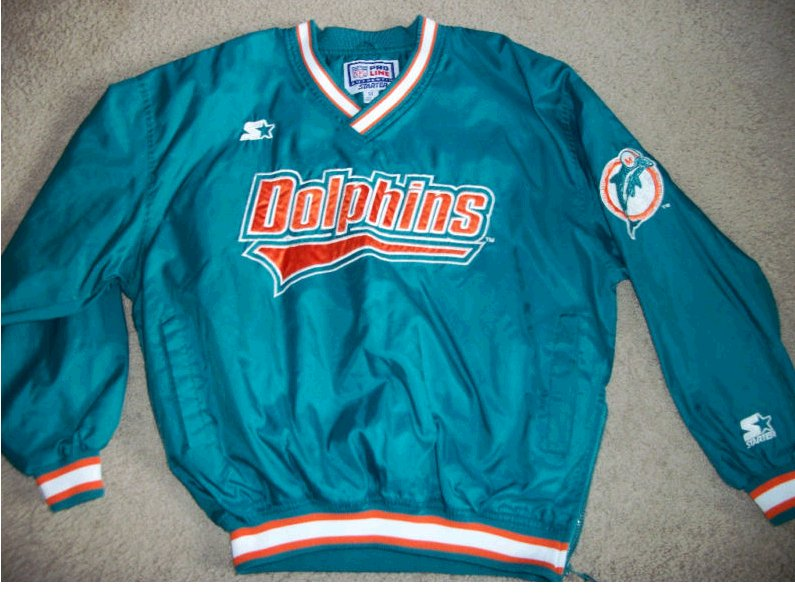
Starter Miami Dolphins breakaway jacket

Starter won a contract to create the parkas that coaches wore on NFL sidelines. For the retail market, Starter designed the "breakaway jacket", a pullover jacket that closely resembled the coach's parka. Sales in 1989 were $58.9 million. By 1990, they had more than doubled to $124.6 million.

In the early 1990s, Starter began to expand its distribution networks to reach over 25 countries in North America, Europe, and the Pacific Rim. The baseball jackets gave way to a hooded design with a side zipper, and eventually to a padded half-zip pullover. Starter apparel also expanded beyond sports clubs into styles such as plaid. A famous ad campaign featured Hip-Hop stars such as DJ Jazzy Jeff. Within two years, Starter's net sales nearly doubled to $356 million. The company went public on the New York Stock Exchange in April 1993, earning an estimated $98 million. Proceeds from the initial public offering were used to expand sales to Europe and the Pacific Rim and also to launch "Brand Starter", the company's own sportswear line minus team logos. Capitalizing on the high recognizability of its name, Starter went head-to-head against brands such as Champion and Russell.

Starter's competition in the licensed sports apparel business intensified in 1994 when Logo 7 Inc., the 2nd. licensed sports apparel manufacturer, won a much coveted NFL Pro Line license and beefed up its advertising budget in an attempt to knock Starter from its number one position. Overall, the boom in the licensed sports apparel market began to slacken in early 1994, slowing from an average of 38 percent annual growth to 15 percent annual growth. Starter moved into new markets with its licensed sports apparel, focusing on sales to young children and youth, and signed a new contract to manufacture the center ice jersey for the National Hockey League. The company purchased a retail chain, First Pick Stores, for $5 million of new stock in March 1994, and also established a Hong Kong office to better coordinate relations with manufacturers. Beckerman stepped down as president, although he retained the posts of chairman and chief executive. John Tucker, former president and chief executive of a sporting goods and sportswear concern, assumed the position of president.

As part of an M&A transaction, Starter acquired all shares of the screen-printing company Galt Sand Co. in 1996 for a total value of $26 million. No contribution to earnings was projected for the current year, but one was anticipated for the following fiscal year, 1997.

=== Decline and restructuring ===
Although Starter began 1994 with a 23-percent increase over the first quarter 1993, it suffered a loss of $2.2 million in the second quarter. Second quarter 1994 sales were flat: $57.8 million, slightly lower than second quarter sales from 1992. Starter had predicted the loss, which it blamed on late deliveries from vendors, shipping delays to retailers, additional advertising and personnel costs, as well as start-up and contractor costs for a new Memphis distribution facility.

1997 saw Starter become one of three suppliers (along with Champion and then-rival Nike) of uniforms for the NBA, most notably the New York Knicks and Charlotte Hornets. When the original company declined financially, their accounts went to Puma. In 2000, when 29 other MLB teams switched to the MLB Authentic Collection, the New York Yankees were the last team to wear Starter jackets.

Starter filed for bankruptcy and the Starter name was purchased in 1999 by Official Starter Properties and Official Starter. These holding companies were in turn purchased by Nike on August 12, 2004, for about $43 million.

=== 2000–present ===
Starter partnered with Walmart during the late 2000s/early 2010s. On November 15, 2007, Iconix Brand Group bought the Starter brand from Nike, Inc. In 2009, Starter signed an exclusive endorsement agreement with quarterback Tony Romo, who was the featured brand ambassador for Starter's national advertising. In those years, Starter manufactured compression shirts, similar to Under Armour brand compression shirts, compression shorts, basketball shorts, snapbacks for other companies/brands, basketball sneakers, tennis shoes, sport team logo-less jackets and slide sandals. Starter had a Tony Romo line of track pants, jerseys and jackets. On March 12, 2013, it was announced that Starter would be relaunching the Starter satin and pull-over jackets in the latter half of Summer in Foot Locker stores and Sports Authority stores within the United States and Canada. The new line of satin and pull-over jackets were sold in stores and online. Starter operated with the assistance of G-III Apparel Group, which produces the jackets had helped Starter acquire licensing to the MLB, NBA, NFL, NHL and NCAA.

On July 24, 2018, it was announced that Starter was selected as the official on-field apparel and game day uniform supplier for all eight teams of the Alliance of American Football, which would shut down midway through its only season in 2019. Starter provided equipment to all teams until the league folded in April 2019. In November 2019, the company announced an agreement with Coca-Cola to produce and commercialise apparel with the logo and image of the brand.

== Former sponsorships ==
=== American/Canadian football ===
==== Leagues ====
- (United States) Alliance of American Football (AAF) – all teams (2019)
- (Canada) CFL – all teams (1993–99)

==== Teams ====
- (United States) San Diego Chargers (1994–98)
- (United States) Miami Dolphins (1997–98)
- (United States) Philadelphia Eagles (1997–98)
- (United States) New York Jets (1999–2000)
- (United States) Green Bay Packers (1992–96)
- (United States) New England Patriots (1995–98)
- (United States) Los Angeles Raiders (1992–95)
- (United States) Baltimore Ravens (1997–98)
- (United States) Washington Redskins (1991–96, 1998)
- (United States) Pittsburgh Steelers (1992–96)
- (United States) Minnesota Vikings (1995–98)

==== Players ====
- (United States) Tony Romo (2008–13)
- (United States) Troy Polamalu (2008–12)

=== Association football ===
- (England) Oxford United (2016–18)

=== Basketball ===
- (United States) New York Knicks
- (United States) Charlotte Hornets
- (United States) Denver Nuggets
- (United States) Cleveland Cavaliers
- (United States) Golden State Warriors
- (United States) Houston Rockets
- (United States) Milwaukee Bucks
- (United States) Minnesota Timberwolves
- (United States) Sacramento Kings

=== Ice hockey ===
- (Canada) (United States) NHL – Boston Bruins, Colorado Avalanche, Florida Panthers, Hartford Whalers/Carolina Hurricanes, Los Angeles Kings, Montreal Canadiens, New York Rangers, Phoenix Coyotes, Pittsburgh Penguins, St. Louis Blues and apparel supplier of the New Jersey Devils 1992–1996

=== NASCAR ===
- (United States) Jeffrey Earnhardt, Circle Sport – The Motorsports Group
- (United States) Elton Sawyer, Akins Motorsports

== Merchandising licensed manufacturer ==
During the 1980s and 1990s, Starter was a prominent manufacturer in the market of licensed uniforms of the main sports leagues in USA and Canada. The following is a list of the products made and commercialized by the company in those years:

=== Jackets ===
- (United States) AAF – all teams
- (Canada) CFL – all teams
- (Canada) (United States) MLB – all teams
- (Canada) (United States) NBA – all teams
- (Canada) (United States) NHL – all teams
- (United States) NFL – all teams
- (United States) NCAA – all teams

=== Replica jerseys ===
- (United States) AAF – all teams (2019)
- (Canada) CFL – all teams (1993–1999)
- (United States) NFL – all teams (1992–1998)
- (Canada) (United States) NHL – all teams (1994–1999)
