= London Fog (company) =

Manufacturer of coats and other clothes

- Type: Subsidiary
- Industry: Textile
- Founded: 1923; 103 years ago
- Founder: Israel Myers
- Headquarters: U.S.A.
- Products: Trench coats, raincoats, jackets, parkas, handbags, umbrellas, Handbags, Luggage, Sleepwear, Footwear, Hosiery, Pet Accessories, Eyewear, Watches, Homeware
- Brands: F.O.G., London Fog Heritage
- Parent: Iconix Brand Group Herman Kay Company
- Website: londonfog.com

London Fog is an American manufacturer of coats and other apparel. The company was founded in 1922–1923 as the Londontown Manufacturing Company, Inc., a clothing company established by Israel Myers.

Products manufactured by London Fog include trench coats, raincoats, jackets, and parkas. Accessories include handbags and umbrellas.

== History ==
By its third decade during World War II (1939/1941–1945), the Londontown Manufacturing Company was known for making waterproof clothing for the United States Navy. Following the war the company partnered with DuPont of Wilmington, Delaware to make material for use in raincoats. These coats, which were the first to have a patented removable liner, were sold in nearby Philadelphia, where they became very popular.

Myers started experimenting with different fabrics in 1951, working with blends of cotton and polyester to help make a waterproof fabric. London Fog introduced its first Maincoat and was found/sold in Saks Fifth Avenue luxury department stores in 1954, being one of the first companies to sell the raincoats and trench coats. The coat originally sold for $29.95, and named as a "Maincoat" by Myers so it could be worn all year around. The company went public in the 1960s. By the 1970s the company had its own stores and was manufacturing not only raincoats but also other types of clothes and accessories. At the time two-thirds of all raincoats sold in the United States were London Fog. London Fog expanded internationally during the 1990s selling in places like the United Kingdom (Great Britain) and China.

By 1976 Interco bought the Londontown Manufacturing Company, Inc. / London Fog, then in a Wall Street take over, they leveraged a buyout that then pushed the company into bankruptcy by 1991. Ultimately the company was renamed to "London Fog Inc."

The original location of the Londontown Manufacturing Company, Inc. included its longtime London Fog mill factory building, which operated for almost four decades. In the 1950s, a small single-story office structure was added at the northwest corner (facing Clipper Mill Road and Union Avenue), along with a large, two-story concrete-walled warehouse annex on the south side, adjacent to the stream bank.

The Londontown Company President Israel Myers (c. 1906–1999), who attended / graduated in 1927 from The Baltimore City College, in the last class to graduate from its old third of four major building sites (before the move in April 1928 to its current landmark stone "Castle on the Hill" structure of Collegiate Gothic architecture on "Collegian Hill" at 33rd Street and The Alameda). The old City College then at the southwest corner of North Howard and West Centre Streets and adjacent to the first downtown campus of The Johns Hopkins University, was an all-boys secondary institution, recognized as the third oldest public high school in America, founded 1839. It has a unique academic reputation with a humanities / liberal arts / social studies and Classics traditions and has had many honored alumni and faculty since. He is pictured and described in "The 1927 Green Bag" yearbook. Myers was later inducted into the B.C.C. Hall of Fame as an outstanding alumnus / "Collegian", Baltimorean / Marylander and businessman / entrepreneur and is listed / pictured in the series of commemorative plaques in the Memorial Corridor at The Castle.

Three decades after the establishment of his Londontown Company in 1923, Myers and his staff occupied the old 1877 Victorian era of Italianate style huge and historic Meadow Mill factory, four stories high of the old Woodberry Manufacturing Company with a distinctive tall clock / bell tower with cupola on its west side and visible up and down the Jones Falls stream valley. It was situated along the west bank of the Jones Falls stream that flowed south from northern Baltimore County to the Inner Harbor of the waterfront Downtown Baltimore / central business district five miles south and divided the city into east and west areas. It had a small steel car bridge and employees gate on the east side crossing the Falls stream underneath the overhead Expressway to reach Hampden and Clipper Mill Road going further south. The complex lay in the frequently heavily flooding stream valley which also contained numerous other early 19th century to early 20th century stone mills for making flour, canvas duck cloth and several metal iron and steel foundries and fabricating machine shops. It was sited between the Woodberry neighborhood on the slope to the west (with famous Druid Hill Park at the top of the heights, one of largest urban parks in America), along with the soon-to-be landmark of the three-pronged "candelabra" television transmitting tower on renamed Television Hill, with its two adjoining TV stations studios. To the east across the Falls lay the other slope with the Hampden residential community. Both twin neighborhoods with many similar thick-walled stone / brick millworkers houses with pitched roofs and dormer windows for the second floor or attics along with early 20th century Baltimore-style rowhouses with little front yards, plus some century-and-half old wood-frame / shingled cottages. Hampden – Woodberry was a longtime unique prosperous working class communities in the northern reaches of Baltimore City.

After almost a quarter-century and suffering another disastrous flood from Hurricane / Tropical Storm Agnes in June 1972, the company headquarters and some industrial manufacturing work was moved in 1976 fifteen miles northwest to Eldersburg, Maryland, in southern then rural / suburban Carroll County, Maryland, to a more modern one-level complex on a newly laid-out Londontown Boulevard, anchored by a modernistic replica steel-frame "Big Ben" British / London style clock tower. The old historic Meadow Mill factory continued to make London Fog raincoats until 1989, when it was later redeveloped / renovated into commercial offices, apartments / condos and a large gymnasium / athletic club in the newer 1950s era annex warehouse reusing the old original historic name of "Meadow Mill" with its refurbished landmark clock / bell tower still visible after 147 years to heavily streaming vehicular traffic along the parallel Jones Falls Expressway (Interstate 83 in Maryland).

In 1994 the London Fog company briefly left Eldersburg for Darien, Connecticut, but returned after a sojourn of less than a year. London Fog had to file for bankruptcy protection in the fall of 1999, they also had to close over 100 stores. In 2000, most of London Fog's offices moved to Seattle, Washington, although the distribution center in Eldersburg remained in operation until 2002. London Fog Industries, was set to emerge from bankruptcy after shedding more than $100 million in debt in 2001.

In 2006 London Fog was acquired by Iconix Brand Group, selling the outerwear division to Herman Kay Company. Iconix Brand Group agreed to purchase the London Fog name for $30.5 million dollars (cash) with an additional $7 million dollars in stock. At the time, executive vice president David Conn of Iconix had plans to market London Fog alongside Coach and Burberry.

During its period under Iconix Brand Group ownership, London Fog has expanded its global footprint and brand visibility through a combination of international retail growth, high-profile partnerships, and marketing initiatives. The brand launched advertising campaigns featuring celebrity ambassadors including Eva Longoria, Nicole Scherzinger, and Neil Patrick Harris. London Fog established a significant presence in China, operating more than 100 standalone stores, while maintaining global distribution across over 2,300 retail locations worldwide. These include major department stores and retailers such as Macy’s, Nordstrom, Hudson’s Bay, Kohl’s, and Boscov’s, among others. During this time, the brand also engaged in select collaborations, including projects with fashion designer Jeremy Scott and the National Gallery, reinforcing its positioning as a modern-classic outerwear label focused on accessible luxury.

== In popular culture ==
London Fog appears as a client of the fictional advertising agency, Sterling Cooper, in the season 3 premiere of Mad Men. In August 2010, Mad Men cast member Christina Hendricks was contracted as the new celebrity model for London Fog.
