= Candie's =

American women's fashion brand

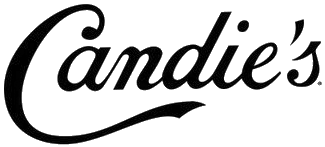
- Product type: Clothing, Footwear, Beauty Products
- Current owner: Iconix Brand Group
- Introduced: 1978; 48 years ago
- Previous owners: List: El Greco, Inc. (1978–86); Pentland Group (1986–91); Charles Cole's (1991–93)
- Website: candies.com

Candie's is an American women's clothing brand launched in 1978. Originally a shoe brand, it has increased its range of products, currently commercializing T-shirts, blouses, dresses, jackets, pants, lingerie, sweaters, etc.

== History ==
Candie's was originally a Charles Cole line of high-heeled wood-bottom shoes from El Greco Inc. The brand shot to fame partly due to Olivia Newton John wearing a pair of Candie's in the final scene of Grease, following which, one of every four women in the United States owned a pair of Candie's by the mid-1980s.

In 1986, Pentland Group acquired El Greco. Pentland sold Candie's to Charles Cole's son Neil in 1991. Candie's Inc. (later renamed Iconix Brand Group) acquired the Candie's brand in 1993. Candie's has also sold juniors' jewelry and apparel. The brand also commercialized two fragrances: Candie's Heartbreaker Perfume Collection and Candie's Luxe Eau de Toilette Perfume Spray. The brand has also added curtains and girls' clothing and apparel.

In June 2001, Candie's launched a non-profit foundation called The Candie's Foundation. The foundation's mission is to fight teenage pregnancy.

Since 2005, Kohl's Department Stores has had exclusive rights to the Candie's brand in all departments except shoes. As of 2020, Kohl's Department Stores stopped carrying the Candie's brand.

== Endorsements ==
Several artists have signed endorsements with Candie's. Some of them are Sarah Hyland, Fifth Harmony, Bella Thorne (the previous spokesperson in 2015 and 2014) while Carly Rae Jepsen, Lea Michele, Vanessa Hudgens, Britney Spears, Dixie Chicks, Hayden Panettiere, Alyssa Milano, Fergie, Lil' Kim, Ashlee Simpson, Hilary Duff, Kelly Clarkson, Jenny McCarthy, Brandy, Vanessa Carlton, Ashanti, and Destiny's Child have also represented the brand.
