= Iconix Brand Group =

American brand management company

Iconix Brand Group, Inc.
- Type: Subsidiary
- Industry: Textile, footwear
- Founded: 1978; 48 years ago
- Founder: Neil Cole
- Headquarters: New York City, U.S.
- Area served: Worldwide
- Key people: Peter Cuneo (executive chairman); Robert C. Galvin (president & CEO)
- Products: Clothing, athletic shoes
- Revenue: US$400 million FY 2011
- Net income: ▲US$80M FY 2011
- Owner: Lancer Capital, LLC
- Number of employees: 120
- Subsidiaries: List: Bonjour; Candie's; Cannon Mills; Cherokee; Ed Hardy; Guess (company); Joe Boxer; Jordache; Lee Cooper; London Fog; Marc Ecko; Material Girl; Mossimo; Mudd; Ocean Pacific; Pony; Rocawear; Sasson; Starter; Umbro; Zoo York
- Website: www.iconixbrand.com

Iconix Brand Group, Inc. is an American brand management company that licenses brands to retailers and manufacturers, primarily in the apparel, footwear and apparel accessory industries.

== History and operations ==
The company began as Candie's, Inc., whose brand it purchased in 1993. The Bongo brand was bought in 1998, then the Badgley Mischka brand was purchased in 2004. The Joe Boxer and Rampage brands were acquired on July 22, 2005, and September 15, 2005, respectively. In 2006, the company acquired the Mudd, London Fog, Mossimo, and Ocean Pacific brands on April 11, August 29, November 1, and November 6, respectively. The company continued with acquisitions in 2007 with the purchase of Cannon, Danskin, Artful Dodger, and Rocawear brands.

On November 15, 2007, Iconix bought the Starter brand from Nike.

On October 27, 2009, Iconix paid $109 million for a 51% stake in urban fashion brand Eckō Unltd. It acquired full ownership in May 2013.

On June 3, 2010, Iconix and Charles M. Schulz Creative Associates jointly acquired all assets related to the Peanuts comic strip from its longtime owner, United Media, using the property to form a new company, Peanuts Worldwide, which is 80% owned by Iconix and 20% owned by Schulz Associates. Peanuts Worldwide also acquired United Media's licensing arm, which represents licensing for its other properties including Dilbert and Nancy.

In 2011, Iconix acquired electronics brand The Sharper Image. In October 2012, Nike Inc. announced that it had signed with Iconix Brand Group to sell the English brand Umbro for US$225 million. The acquisition was completed in December 2012.

In 2013, Iconix acquired Lee Cooper from Sun Capital Partners. In February 2013, Iconix acquired control of the Buffalo David Bitton brand in an effort to expand into higher-end brands. Iconix paid Buffalo International ULC $76.5 million in cash for a 51% stake in the brand.

In February 2015, Iconix bought the Strawberry Shortcake brand from American Greetings. Also that month, Iconix and Anthony L&S Athletics, LLC acquired intangible assets of Pony along with North American rights to the brand from Symphony Holdings, LLC, with the option to purchase additional markets. A new subsidiary, with 75% and 25% stakes owned by Iconix and Anthony L&S Athletics respectively, would hold the Pony rights.

In 2015, several top executives, including founder Neil Cole, resigned following a statement that Iconix was under investigation by the Securities and Exchange Commission. The investigation was triggered by Iconix's 2014 financial statements, after which it received a letter from the SEC. Stock prices fell 24% after Iconix confirmed the investigation. On December 5, 2019, the SEC charged Iconix and three of its former top executives with fraud. The COO, Seth Horowitz, pleaded guilty to the charges, and Iconix agreed to pay a $5.5 million penalty. As of July 2020, the suit against the founder and previous CEO, Neil Cole, is still ongoing.

In 2017, Iconix sold Badgley Mischka and The Sharper Image.

On May 10, 2017, DHX Media announced that it had acquired the Iconix entertainment division for $345 million. The sale was closed on June 30, 2017, giving DHX rights to the Strawberry Shortcake franchise, and more prominently, the 80% majority stake of Peanuts Worldwide.

On October 15, 2018, Iconix announced the hiring of Robert Galvin as CEO.

On July 14, 2020, Iconix announced that the company is up for sale. The next year, the company went private, with private equity investor Lancer Capital, LLC purchasing all outstanding shares and delisting it from Nasdaq.

In September 2024, Iconix acquired the Salt Life brand out of bankruptcy in partnership with Hilco Consumer-Retail Group for just under $39 million, following a Chapter 11 filing by its then-owner Delta Apparel. The company closed all 28 of Salt Life's retail stores and transitioned the brand to a licensing model. By November 2025, CEO Robert Galvin reported that the brand had doubled in size to $100 million in revenue since the acquisition, and predicted it could grow to $500 million.

In March 2026, Iconix International signed a global licensing agreement with Revlon Consumer Products to develop and launch the first Salt Life fragrance collection, set to debut in 2027, marking the second licensing deal between the two companies following the renewal of the Ed Hardy fragrance license.

== Federal investigations ==
After investigations in 2003, Neil Cole and Candie's reached an agreement to settle charges of fraudulent accounting practices brought against it by the Securities and Exchange Commission. Neil Cole agreed to pay $75,000 to settle charges without admitting or denying wrongdoing.

In 2019, Cole was again charged with 10 criminal counts, including conspiracy, securities fraud, making false filings with the SEC and conspiracy to destroy records. Iconix agreed to pay a civil penalty of $5.5 million to settle the SEC's claims.

In October 2025, the United States Court of Appeals for the Second Circuit overturned Cole's 2022 conviction, ruling that retrying him on charges a previous jury had deadlocked on constituted double jeopardy. The court ordered the indictment dismissed.

Following his acquittal, Cole filed a $45 million lawsuit in November 2025 against Iconix and former COO Seth Horowitz, seeking $25 million from Iconix for breach of contract and $20 million from Horowitz for malicious prosecution, alleging that Horowitz had provided false testimony to investigators that led to the fraud charges against him.

== Brands ==
Through its history, Iconix has owned a large portfolio of brands, which include:

=== Current ===
- Artful Dodger
- Bongo
- Buffalo David Bitton
- Candie's
- Cannon Mills
- Charisma
- Danskin
- Ed Hardy
- Eckō Unltd. and Marc Eckō Cut & Sew
- Fieldcrest
- Joe Boxer
- Lee Cooper
- London Fog
- Material Girl
- Modern Amusement
- Mossimo
- Mudd
- Ocean Pacific/OP
- Pony
- Rampage
- Rocawear
- Royal Velvet
- Starter
- Umbro
- Waverly
- Zoo York

=== Former brands ===
- Pillowtex
- Truth or Dare
- Badgley Mischka (2004–17)
- Peanuts Worldwide (80%; 2010–17); sold in 2017 to DHX Media (now WildBrain)
- The Sharper Image (2011–17)
- Strawberry Shortcake acquired in 2015 from American Greetings; sold in 2017 to DHX Media (now WildBrain)

== See also ==
- Phillips Van Heusen
- Authentic Brands Group
