= Florida Ridge, Florida =

- CDP
- Location in Indian River County and the state of Florida
- Coordinates: 27°34′49″N 80°22′45″W
- Country: United States
- State: Florida
- County: Indian River

Area
  - Total: 12.58 sq mi (32.59 km^{2})
  - Land: 10.77 sq mi (27.89 km^{2})
  - Water: 1.81 sq mi (4.70 km^{2})
- Elevation: 23 ft (7.0 m)

Population (2020)
  - Total: 21,302
  - Density: 1,977.9/sq mi (763.67/km^{2})
- Time zone: UTC-5 (Eastern (EST))
  - Summer (DST): UTC-4 (EDT)
- ZIP codes: 32962, 32968
- Area code: 772
- FIPS code: 12-23050
- GNIS feature ID: 2402489

Florida Ridge is a census-designated place (CDP) in Indian River County, Florida, United States. As of the 2020 census, Florida Ridge had a population of 21,302.

Florida Ridge is part of the Sebastian–Vero Beach Metropolitan Statistical Area.

== Geography ==
According to the United States Census Bureau, the CDP has a total area of 12.6 square miles (33 km^{2}), of which 10.8 square miles (28 km^{2}) is land and 1.8 square miles (4.7 km^{2}) (14.15%) is water.

== Demographics ==
Historical population
Census	Pop.	Note	%±
2020	21,302		—
U.S. Decennial Census

=== 2020 census ===
As of the 2020 census, Florida Ridge had a population of 21,302. The median age was 47.0 years. 19.8% of residents were under the age of 18 and 26.4% of residents were 65 years of age or older. For every 100 females there were 94.5 males, and for every 100 females age 18 and over there were 92.2 males age 18 and over.

100.0% of residents lived in urban areas, while 0.0% lived in rural areas.

There were 8,830 households in Florida Ridge, of which 25.6% had children under the age of 18 living in them. Of all households, 48.0% were married-couple households, 16.8% were households with a male householder and no spouse or partner present, and 27.1% were households with a female householder and no spouse or partner present. About 26.7% of all households were made up of individuals and 16.1% had someone living alone who was 65 years of age or older.

There were 10,218 housing units, of which 13.6% were vacant. The homeowner vacancy rate was 1.6% and the rental vacancy rate was 7.5%.

Racial composition as of the 2020 census
Race	Number	Percent
White	14,452	67.8%
Black or African American	3,082	14.5%
American Indian and Alaska Native	88	0.4%
Asian	362	1.7%
Native Hawaiian and Other Pacific Islander	27	0.1%
Some other race	1,066	5.0%
Two or more races	2,225	10.4%
Hispanic or Latino (of any race)	3,234	15.2%

=== 2000 census ===
As of the census of 2000, there were 15,217 people, 6,412 households, and 4,437 families residing in the CDP. The population density was 1,409.3 inhabitants per square mile (544.1/km^{2}). There were 7,330 housing units at an average density of 678.9 per square mile (262.1/km^{2}). The racial makeup of the CDP was 85.54% White, 11.10% African American, 0.19% Native American, 0.68% Asian, 0.01% Pacific Islander, 0.99% from other races, and 1.49% from two or more races. Hispanic or Latino of any race were 4.07% of the population.

There were 6,412 households, out of which 26.6% had children under the age of 18 living with them, 54.6% were married couples living together, 10.6% had a female householder with no husband present, and 30.8% were non-families. 25.4% of all households were made up of individuals, and 15.3% had someone living alone who was 65 years of age or older. The average household size was 2.37 and the average family size was 2.81.

In the CDP, the population was spread out, with 22.6% under the age of 18, 6.0% from 18 to 24, 25.3% from 25 to 44, 20.0% from 45 to 64, and 26.1% who were 65 years of age or older. The median age was 42 years. For every 100 females, there were 91.9 males. For every 100 females age 18 and over, there were 88.6 males.

The median income for a household in the CDP was $37,608, and the median income for a family was $43,395. Males had a median income of $29,104 versus $21,753 for females. The per capita income for the CDP was $19,671. About 6.4% of families and 9.5% of the population were below the poverty line, including 14.0% of those under age 18 and 4.5% of those age 65 or over.
