= Al Black =

American landscape artist

- Born: Albert Lee Black; July 12, 1947; Barlow, Mississippi, U.S.
- Died: May 12, 2025 (aged 77); Fort Pierce, Florida, U.S.
- Other name: Blood Black
- Occupation: Painter
- Known for: A member of Florida Highwaymen
- Children: 8

Albert Lee Black (July 12, 1947 – May 12, 2025) was an American landscape artist. He was an original member of the Florida Highwaymen, a group of fellow African American landscape artists. Black started as salesperson for the Highwaymen artists, but learned from them how to paint. He spent 12 years in prison for fraud but continued his work as an artist there. Black was inducted into the Florida Artists Hall of Fame in 2004 as one of the 26 members of the Highwaymen.

== Early life ==
Black was born July 12, 1947 in Barlow, Mississippi. When he was 14-years-old, he left home rather than become a farm worker. Black found work in Florida delivering typewriters. Alfred Hair and other Highwaymen painters began using Black as a roadway salesman for their paintings. Because the still-wet paintings sometimes suffered damage in the trunk of his car, Black learned painting techniques to repair the damage.

== Career ==
Following the death of Hair in 1970, Black switched from being just a salesman for the Highwaymen to being a landscape artist himself.

=== Conviction ===
In November 1996, Black was charged with grand theft for swindling an elderly widow of more than $1 million. Over a five-year period, the woman had given Black daily support money and a trailer to live in exchange for the promise of sharing the proceeds of his art sales and an alleged inheritance of his deceased parent's estate. Black was arrested in his trailer and charged with crack cocaine and drug paraphernalia in addition to fraud. Black had previous arrests for burglary, battery, check fraud, and drug possession. In 1997, Black was sentenced to 12 years for fraud.

=== Prison murals ===
While incarcerated at the Florida Department of Corrections CFRC in Orlando for three years, Black was permitted by the warden to paint 90 large wall murals. Black then painted more wall murals after his transfer to the Tomoka Correctional Institution in Daytona Beach and was commissioned to paint a mural at the prison in Zephyrhills, Florida. He was released in 2006.

Following release from prison, Black returned to live in Fort Pierce where he continued a career as a landscape artist. He also gave painting workshops and made personal appearances at art festivals.

== Personal life ==
Black was the father of eight children. He died on May 12, 2025 following hospitalization for pulmonary disease.
