= Lori McNamara =

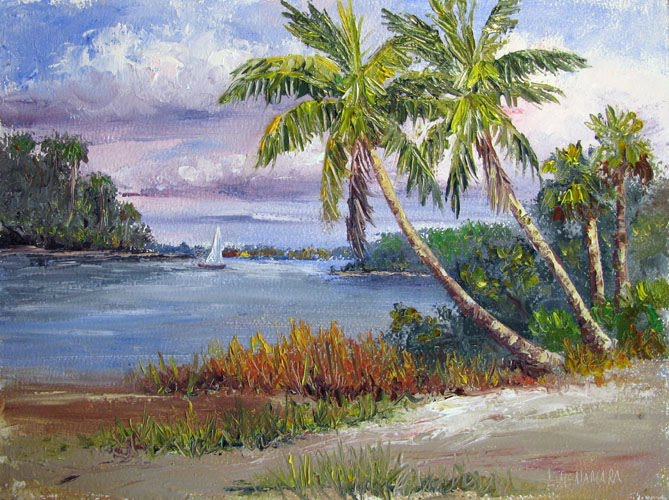
Coconut Cove, 2010, oil on masonite, 9x12 inches

Lenore "Lori" McNamara (born April 30, 1952) is an artist in Fort Pierce, Florida. She works en plein air and paints in an Impressionist style. Her work has been featured in several galleries, especially in the A. E. Backus Gallery & Museum in Fort Pierce, and it is currently on display in her studio at the ArtBank, also in Fort Pierce.

McNamara is best known for her landscapes, which depict natural Florida environments, executed with a bold impasto technique. She is a highly prolific artist, and has published over 1,000 of her paintings on the Daily Painters Art Gallery website.

She is currently the leader of the Plein Air Painters of the Treasure Coast. In 2005 McNamara published an article in Plein Air Magazine about the history of this organization.

A native of Fort Pierce, Florida, McNamara has painted since childhood, when she received a few lessons from A.E. Backus.
