= The Highwaymen (landscape artists) =

African-American group of artists

The Highwaymen, also referred to as the Florida Highwaymen, are a group of 26 African American landscape artists from the area of Fort Pierce, Florida. They made a living selling their paintings door-to-door to businesses and individuals throughout Florida from the mid-1950s through the 1980s. Due to the racial segregation that was in place in Florida in the 1950s, they faced many racial and cultural barriers. No professional galleries would accept the work of Black artists so they also sold their art work from the trunks of their cars along the eastern coastal roads earning the moniker of Highwaymen. The roads Florida State Road A1A and U.S. Route 1 in Florida were roads where they sold their work.

Many members of the Highwaymen credit their training and style to their high school art teacher Zanobia Jefferson and to the mentorship of prominent local artist Alfred "Beanie" Backus. The Highwaymen created large numbers of relatively inexpensive landscape paintings using construction materials rather than traditional art supplies. As a group, an estimated 200,000 paintings were sold.

== History ==
Several of the Highwaymen artists received their first training at the Lincoln Park Academy in Fort Pierce, Florida, under the guidance of a young art teacher, Zanobia Jefferson. In 1950s segregated Florida, Lincoln Park Academy was the high school for Fort Pierce's African-American students and Jefferson's passionate teaching became a draw for serious black art students. In 1955, Jefferson introduced one particularly talented student, 14-year-old Alfred Hair, to her friend A. E. Backus, a prominent Florida landscape artist. Backus agreed to train Hair in his backyard studio. During the same year, 19-year-old African American artist Harold Newton also met Backus and was inspired to paint landscapes in Backus' style rather than religious scenes. Newton sold his landscapes from the trunk of his car because art galleries in South Florida refused to represent African Americans. After three years of lessons with Backus, Hair also began selling landscape paintings.

Newton and Hair attracted a group of a "young, energetic" artists who painted large quantities of brilliantly colorful impressionistic landscapes that they each sold from their cars. Newton was recognized by fellow artists for his technical inspiration while Hair was considered the leader and catalyst "who set the tone for the group through the 1960s." Future Highwaymen artists Charles Walker, Livingston Roberts, and James Gibson credit Backus' mentorship and the afternoons they spent watching him paint at his studio with their growth as painters. According to Gibson, they couldn't sell their paintings to wealthy people, so instead they painted and sold in quick quantities. Gibson said, "Mr. Backus would say, 'Slow Down. Slow down.' But that's not what it was all about for us. It was about painting fast so we could sell our paintings." While Backus could sell one painting for $350, the Highwaymen would sell ten paintings for $35 each.

In 1970, the group lost its charismatic leader when Hair was killed in a barroom brawl at age 29 and the prodigious output of the movement's artists began to wane. By the 1980s, a shift in public tastes and the growth of corporate entities like Disney World further reduced the demand for the movement's art.

In 1995 Jim Fitch, a Florida art historian, and Jeff Klinkenberg, of the St. Petersburg Times, wrote articles about the group whom Fitch dubbed "The Florida Highwaymen" for their business of selling art door-to-door along US Highway 1 in Florida. The attention created new interest for their idyllic landscapes of natural settings in Florida igniting sales of the paintings. This activity increased the value of the artwork and created further demand. All 26 Florida Highwaymen were inducted into the Florida Artists Hall of Fame in 2004.

=== Members ===
In 2004, twenty-six African-American artists were identified as Highwaymen. These artists were inducted into the Florida Artists Hall of Fame in 2004 as the Highwaymen and include: Curtis Arnett, Hezekiah Baker, Al "Blood" Black, brothers Ellis and George Buckner, Robert Butler, Mary Ann Carroll (the only woman in the group), brothers Johnny and Willie Daniels, Rodney Demps, James Gibson, Alfred Hair, Isaac Knight, Robert Lewis, John Maynor, Roy McLendon, Alfonso "Poncho" Moran, brothers Sam, Lemuel and Harold Newton, Willie Reagan, Livingston "Castro" Roberts, Carnell "Pete" Smith Sr., Charles Walker, Sylvester Wells, and Charles "Chico" Wheeler.

Of the twenty six, nine are considered "original" (or the earliest) Highwaymen: Harold Newton, Alfred Hair, Roy McLendon, James Gibson, Livingston Roberts, Mary Ann Carroll, Sam Newton, Willie Daniels, and Al Black.

As of May 2022, eighteen were deceased, Alfred Hair, Alfonso Moran, Carnell Smith, Charles Wheeler, Ellis and George Buckner, Harold Newton, Hezekiah Baker, Isaac Knight, James Gibson, John Maynor, Johnny Daniels, Lemuel Newton, Livingston Roberts, Mary Ann Carroll, Robert Butler, Rodney Demps, and Willie Daniels.

== Style ==
The Highwaymen were mostly self-taught painters, who mentored each other. Excluded from the traditional world of art shows and galleries, the Highwaymen painted on inexpensive upson board or masonite and framed their paintings with crown molding (brushed with gold or silver paint to "antique" them). They packed these paintings into the trunks of their cars and sold them door-to-door throughout the south-eastern coast of Florida. Sometimes the paintings were stacked before the oil paint was dry. Painting en plein air style, the Highwaymen artists "eschew[ed] any formal color theory and rel[ied] on instinct and intuition to depict their steady stream of beaches, palm trees and Everglades scenes. Organic colors were not their main focus; they wanted to wow buyers with burnt-orange Florida skies or unnaturally florescent clouds."

Most of the paintings are signed, but there are a number of paintings that weren't, there are a number of paintings that are sold as "Highwaymen Style" that emulate the iconic landscapes of the Highwaymen artists. Older paintings from the 1950s and early 60s era are more sought after by collectors.

== Highwaymen Museum ==
The City of Fort Pierce Florida Highwaymen Museum opened during Black History month in February 2026. The museum, located at 1234 Avenue D in Fort Pierce, Florida features exhibitions of paintings by the 26 original members of the Florida Highwaymen art movement. The museum also highlights the difficulties experienced by the Highwaymen artists during the Jim Crow era.

== Legacy ==
In 2008, an hour-long PBS-TV documentary film was released called The Highwaymen: Legends of the Road. It was produced by father and son team Jack and John Hambrick (both veteran TV news journalists). The original, titled The Highwaymen: Florida's Outsider Artists premiered at the Appleton Museum in Ocala in 2003 and was picked up by PBS. It generally airs during Black History month. Narrated by Spencer Christian, the Hambrick team was responsible for this one as well and the second, more commercial oriented documentary.

On May 18, 2011, Mary Ann Carroll, the only female Highwayman was an honored guest at Michelle Obama's First Lady's Luncheon. Carroll presented a poinciana tree painting to the First Lady.

In August thru to October 2011, at Howard University, Washington, D.C., entitled "The Road to Freedom," a selection of early Highwaymen paintings, was exhibited at the university's Blackburn Gallery.

In February 2016, an exhibition in Ottawa, Canada was sponsored by the United States Embassy for US Black History month. The exhibit at the SAW Gallery included 30 paintings by all members of the Florida Highwaymen and a documentary.

In March 2020, the Florida legislature passed a bill creating specialty license plates to honor the group's work.

Venues for exhibits have included the Smithsonian National Museum of African American History and Culture (Washington D.C.), the Homer & Dolly Hand Art Center at Stetson University,Orange County Regional History Center (Orlando, Florida), A. E. Backus Gallery & Museum in Fort Pierce, Florida, The Florida House (Washington, D.C.), Elliott Museum (Stuart, Florida), and The Florida Aquarium (Tampa, Florida).

The Museum of Florida History in Tallahassee has paintings by twenty-three of the original twenty-six artists.

== See also ==
- African American art
