= Jacqueline Brice =

American painter

Jacqueline "Jackie" Brice (born 1935) is an American painter, teacher and volunteer in Florida. She was born in Florida and started painting in 1967. She resides in Jupiter, Florida and travels widely, depicting Florida's rivers, back country, and wetlands.

Brice studied for ten years with Vela Boss of Miami. She then studied for eleven years with her mentor and friend A.E. Backus of Fort Pierce. She was a 2012 inductee into the Florida Artists Hall of Fame. A teacher and volunteer, she is known for her landscapes. She traveled to the Loire Valley in France to study and paint and has made many painting expeditions in Florida, including to St. Marks National Wildlife Refuge in Wakulla, Jefferson, and Taylor Counties, the Florida Keys, and the Fakahatchee Strand State Preserve (in search of the ghost orchid).

One of her commissions was an oil painting to commemorate Barry University's 50th anniversary.
