= Alfred Hair =

American painter

Alfred Warner Hair
- Born: May 20, 1941; Fort Pierce, Florida
- Died: August 9, 1970 (aged 29); Fort Pierce, Florida
- Movement: Florida Highwaymen
- Spouse: Doretha
- Children: 4

Alfred Warner Hair (1941-1970), also Freddy Hair, was an American painter from Fort Pierce, Florida who, along with Harold Newton, was instrumental in founding the Florida Highwaymen artist movement. Hair was the leader of a loose-knit group of prolific African American painters who sold their vibrantly colorful landscapes from the trunks of cars along the eastern coastal roads of South Florida. In 2004, Hair was inducted into the Florida Artists Hall of Fame.

== Early life ==
Alfred Warner Hair was born 20 May 1941 in Fort Pierce, Florida, one of seven children of Samuel and Annie Mae Hair. Hair graduated from Lincoln Park Academy in 1961, and attended one year at community college before dropping out to pursue his career as an artist.

== Career ==
Hair's artistic talent had been noticed by his high school art teacher Zanobia Jefferson and she introduced him to the prominent Florida landscape artist, A. E. Backus. Backus had been encouraging several young African American artists and persuading them to paint landscapes rather than religious motifs. In 1956, when Hair was 14 years old, he began taking painting lessons from Backus. After three years, Hair set out on his own to earn a living as an artist. Because of Jim Crow era racism, art galleries in Florida would not represent African American artists, forcing Hair to find other methods of selling his artwork. Following the example of Backus' former student Harold Newton, Hair peddled his landscape paintings door-to-door from the trunk of his car.

Hair and Newton inspired a loose-knit group of 26 African American artists to follow their leads. While Newton is recognized by fellow artists for his technical inspiration, Hair is considered the leader and catalyst "who set the tone for the group through the 1960s." He gathered a group of a "young, energetic" artists who painted large quantities of brilliantly colorful impressionistic landscapes.

Hair created dozens of paintings at a time. He later hired friends to drive along the highways, selling his paintings door-to-door for $20 or $25. According to fellow members of the Highwaymen, Hair had vowed that his art would make him a millionaire by the time he was 35 years old.

In 1970, Hair was killed in a barroom brawl at age 29 and the prodigious output of the movement's artists began to wane.

== Style ==
Hair "eschew[ed] any formal color theory and rel[ied] on instinct and intuition to depict [a] steady stream of beaches, palm trees and Everglades scenes. Organic colors were not their main focus; they wanted to wow buyers with burnt-orange Florida skies or unnaturally florescent clouds." Hair worked on dozens of canvasses at once. According to visual arts professor Gary Monroe, "He would tack up 20 boards at a time outdoors, then quickly lay down the color without sketches, as fast as he could, going from board to board, painting parts of sky, a tree or some other element. The essence of his paintings was spontaneity, bold colors, palm trees, surf, sand and incredible skies. 'Painting fast was a prerequisite, not a deterrent to Hair's art,' Mr. Monroe writes. 'He simply "threw paint" on his boards to miraculously achieve images that are more about being alive than about the manipulation of plastic values.' "

Hair signed his original works "A. Hair." Several dozen paintings produced in 1966 and 1967 were signed "Freddy." According to his widow, the Freddy paintings were collaborative works in which she painted the backgrounds and Hair completed all of the detail work.

== Personal life ==
Hair was married to Doretha Hair (later Truesdell) with whom he had four children, Alfred Jr., Sherry, Roderick and Lisa. On 9 August 1970, Hair was shot to death during a barroom dispute.
