= Florida Council on Arts and Culture =

Florida Council on Arts and Culture is a 15-member advisory council appointed to advise the Florida Secretary of State regarding cultural grant funding and on matters pertaining to culture in Florida including appointments to the Florida Artists Hall of Fame.

Appointments are determined by the Governor of Florida, President of the Florida Senate and Speaker of the Florida House in consultation with the Florida Secretary of State. The Governor manages seven seats that serve four-year terms. The President and Speaker manage four seats each, with terms of two years. According to the council's website: "The appointments are based on geographic representation, as well as demonstrated history of community service in the arts and culture."

The current members of the Florida Council on Arts and Culture are:

Mr. Rivers Buford, III	Leon County	
Ms. Lisa Burgess	Broward County	
Ms. LaVon Bracy Davis	Orange County	Chair
Ms. Tara Forman	Broward County	
Mr. Richard Forsyth	Hillsborough County	
Mr. Towson Fraser	Leon County	
Ms. Patricia Frost	Miami-Dade County	
Commissioner Deborah Kynes	Pinellas County	
Ms. Carroll Hanley Goggin	Orange County	
Mr. Frank Gromling	Flagler County	
Ms. Heather Mayo	Leon County	
Dr. Alix Miller	Leon County	
Representative Holly Raschein	Monroe County	Vice Chair
Mr. Jason Tapia	Miami-Dade County	
Ms. Pat Williams	Martin County	Secretary
