= Robert Butler (artist) =

American visual artist (1943–2014)

- Born: September 25, 1943; Baxley, Georgia
- Died: March 19, 2014; Lakeland, Florida
- Known for: Paintings depicting Florida's wildlife and landscapes
- Board member of: The Florida Highwaymen LLC (Pres.)
- Children: 9
- Parent: Annie Talifer Butler
- Website: robertbutler.org

Robert Butler (September 25, 1943 – March 19, 2014) was a postwar and contemporary artist best known for his portrayals of the woods and backwaters around Florida's Everglades. He was a member of the well-known African-American artists group, The Highwaymen.

== Early life ==
Butler was born in the small timber and farming community of Baxley, Georgia, on September 25, 1943. He was raised by his mother, Annie Talifer Butler, who worked as a farm hand, maid, and waitress.

In 1947, Butler moved to Okeechobee, Florida, where he later became intimately familiar with the woods and waters of the Florida Everglades, and especially Lake Okeechobee, that feature prominently in his paintings. Robert Butler's goal in his paintings was to preserve the nature around him which was easily accessible due to his location. The inspiration for the content of his paintings was drawn from those various landscapes.

His professional career began in 1968. In the early days, he often sold his paintings door-to-door or on the roadside. The term "Highwayman" which Butler helped to coin for his category of artist was given due to their method of producing paintings and then traveling along the highways of Florida to sell the paintings for a living. He honed his skills by creating upwards of one hundred paintings per year. Despite a lack of formal training, Butler developed his own style, which was exemplified by dramatically-lit portrayals of landscapes.

Butler was named a Knight by a member of the Royal Family of Ethiopia, namely Prince Ermias Sahle Selassie. The Imperial Order of the Star of Honor of the Ethiopian Empire, the order to which Butler was inducted, was created to honor both domestic and foreign individuals who had given exemplary service to the Ethiopian Empire.

== Personal life ==
Butler had nine children, five of whom became artists. Sometime in his 40s Butler was diagnosed with diabetes. Butler died at a nursing home in Lakeland, Florida on March 19, 2014, at the age of 70, due to complications from diabetes.

== Bibliography ==
- 2014 - Highwaymen Artists, An Untold Truth
