= Sunrise Theatre =

- U.S. National Register of Historic Places
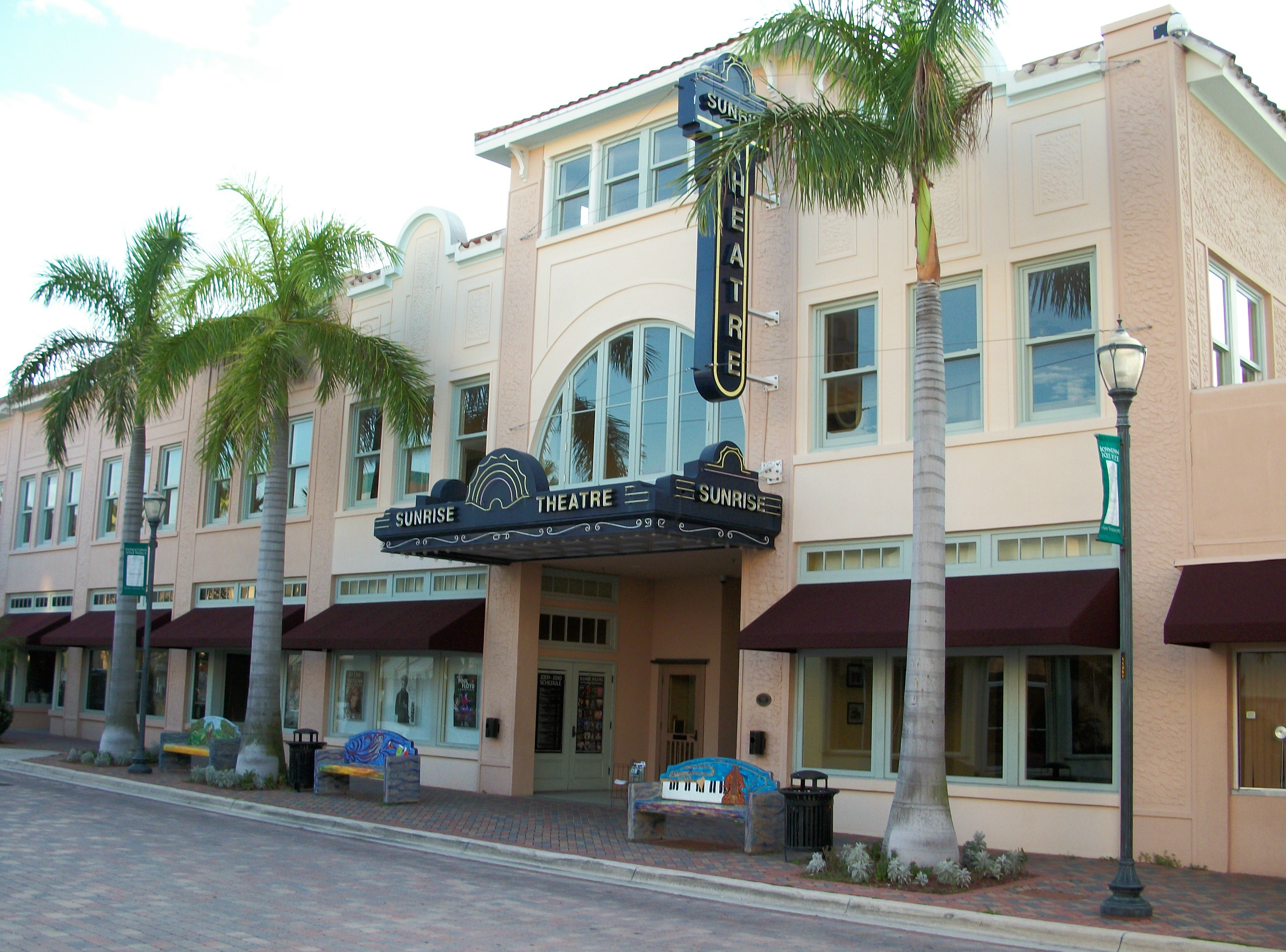

- Location within Florida Location within the United States
- Location: 117 South Second Street; Fort Pierce, Florida 34950
- Coordinates: 27°26′46″N 80°19′26″W
- Built: 1923
- Architects: John N. Sherwood, C.E. Cahow
- Architectural style: Mediterranean Revival
- NRHP reference No.: 01001339
- Added to NRHP: December 7, 2001

The Sunrise Theatre (also known as the Sunrise Building) is a historic theater in Fort Pierce, Florida. It is located at 117 South 2nd Street.

== History ==
Built in 1923 by builder C.E. Cahow, the Sunrise Theatre was designed in the Mediterranean Revival Style by architect John N. Sherwood. Opening day was August 1, 1923 as a vaudeville house. The theatre earned its reputation for becoming the cultural center of the city of Fort Pierce as well as being the greatest and biggest cultural institution in Florida at the time. At the time it had the largest stage between Jacksonville and Miami. It was designed for plays, movies and variety shows. In 1930 the young A.E. Backus became resident artist for the theater. Backus created displays and posters for the theatre's films and celebrity appearances.

=== Closure & renaissance ===
The theater closed in 1983 after it had fallen into disrepair. In 1997, the St. Lucie Preservation Association Inc. bought the building. It later partially reopened in 1999 after a $750,000 grant was awarded to renovate and restore the structure to its former condition. After a complete renovation including adding additional support areas in 2005, the venue opened on January 6, 2006.

On December 7, 2001, it was added to the U.S. National Register of Historic Places.

It now presents a wide variety of entertainment events from local groups to world-famous artists such as Willie Nelson, Itzhak Perlman, Diana Ross, 3 Dog Night, Lindsey Buckingham, Bryan Adams, Vince Gill, Tony Bennett, Ziggy Marley, the late Dave Brubeck plus world renowned Operas, Broadway Shows, Ballet performances, and various Rock and Jazz concerts.

On February 5, 2020 Kris Kristofferson made his last full performance at the Sunrise Theatre as he was backed by the Strangers.

The theater received $1 million grant in 2021 from the Small Business Administration to help keep it afloat during the COVID-19 pandemic. The grant came through the Shuttered Venues Operator program, a part of the American Rescue Plan.

== See also ==
- Old Fort Pierce City Hall: a nearby structure also built by C.E. Cahow

== External List ==
- St. Lucie County listings at National Register of Historic Places
- Sunrise Theatre History
- Sunrise Theater renovation panoramic views and Spherical panorama views of the finished theater on stage at the Sunrise and in the balcony from i-ota.net's Panoramas of the Treasure Coast, Kennedy Space Center, Vero Beach, Fort Pierce, and Stuart
