= Boston House =

Historic house in Florida, United States

- Cresthaven
- U.S. National Register of Historic Places
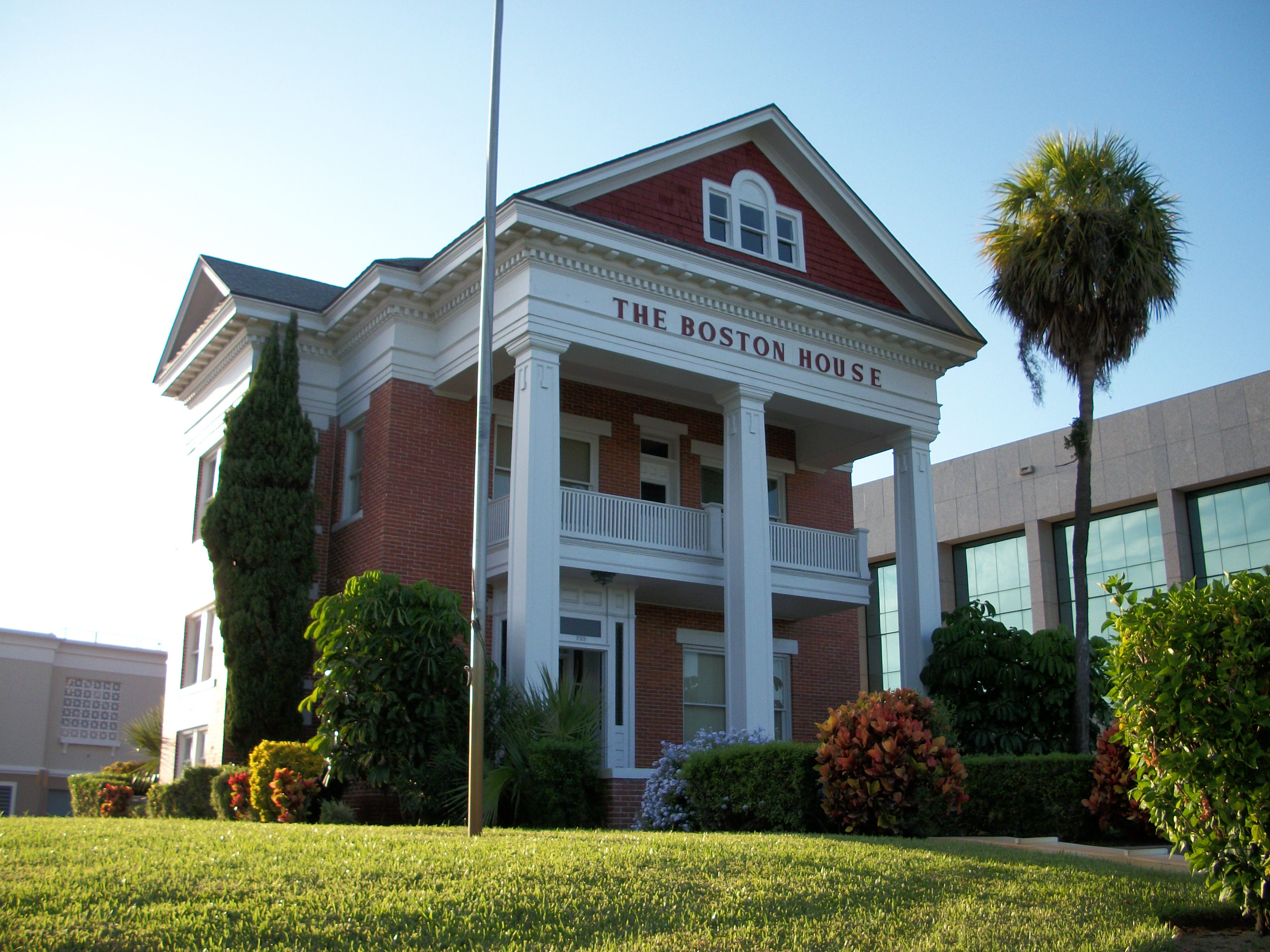

- Location within Florida Location within the United States
- Location: 239 S. Indian River Drive (CR 707) Fort Pierce, Florida 34950
- Coordinates: 27°26′44″N 80°19′25″W
- Built: 1909
- Architect: C.A. Justice
- Architectural style: Colonial Revival, Classical Revival, Georgian Revival
- NRHP reference No.: 85000770
- Added to NRHP: 11 April 1985

The Boston House (also known as Cresthaven) is a historic building in downtown Fort Pierce, Florida. It is located at 239 South Indian River Drive (County Road 707). On April 11, 1985, it was added to the U.S. National Register of Historic Places. It is recognized for its unique mixture of Neo-classical and Georgian architecture. It is also recognized for its part in local history. On April 18, 2012, the AIA's Florida Chapter placed the building on its list of Florida Architecture: 100 Years. 100 Places as Cresthaven/Boston House.

== History ==
In the early 1900s, William T. Jones, who later became the third Sheriff of St. Lucie County, worked as an engineer for Henry Flagler on the Florida East Coast Railway. Jones suffered an injury in a railroad accident and received a settlement for his injury. With his settlement he built Cresthaven which is known today as The Boston House. Historical records show the cost of building the house was $6,000 and it wasn't completed until 1909. Some of the materials used to build the house were brought to Fort Pierce from Georgia by the FEC Railroad as Jones was a personal friend of Henry Flagler. Jones lost the house during the Great Depression.

The McCarty family, whose most famous member was Dan McCarty, the thirty-first governor of Florida, bought the house in 1949, but didn't live in it. They preferred to stay across Boston Avenue in the family home built in 1905. That house was later known as The Governor's House until its demolition. The Boston House (Cresthaven) was restored in 1984–85 and is now a law firm's office. There are many myths surrounding the house's history.
