= Will McLean =

American singer-songwriter (1919–1990)

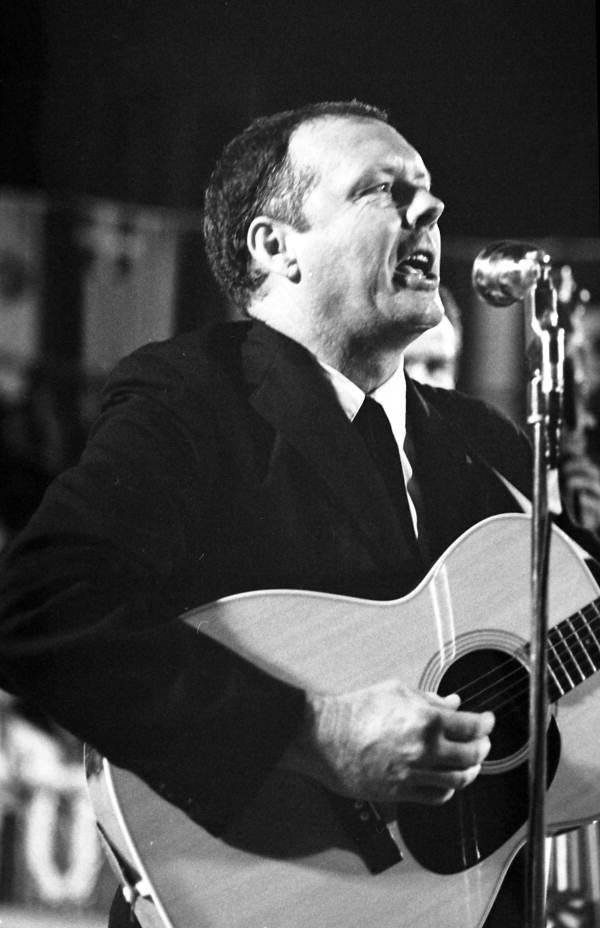
- Will McLean performing at the 1970 Florida Folk Festival
- Born: 1919; Chipley, Florida, US
- Died: January 1990 (aged 70–71)
- Occupation: Singer-songwriter

Will McLean (1919–1990) was a Florida folk singer-songwriter. He was inducted into the Florida Artists Hall of Fame in 1996.

McLean also wrote "Osceola's Last Words", a stirring tribute to the Seminole chief. Michael Peter Smith, with his wife Barbara Barrow, recorded the best-known version of this song.

== Will McLean music festivals ==
A weekend music festival is held every March at the Sertoma Youth Camp in Brooksville, Florida. The original festival was held in White Springs. In 2007, Florida film producer Elam Stoltzfus, in conjunction with the Will McLean Foundation, created a short film; "Will McLean: Songs about Florida” for the festival. The College of Central Florida hosted “Hold Back the Waters: A Festival of Will McLean and Florida Folk” in September 2014.

== McLean archives ==
Will McLean's song lyrics, correspondence, photographs, recordings, newspaper articles and personal artifacts such as his guitar, harmonica and black hat, Florida Artists Hall of Fame Award and more are preserved in the Special Collections Area of the University of Florida George A. Smathers Libraries. A collection of photographs of Will McLean are maintained in an archive kept by the state of Florida, entitled, Florida Folklife Collection.
