= Heathcote Botanical Gardens =

Botanical garden in Fort Pierce, Florida, US

Coordinates: 27°25′5.8″N 80°19′26.4″W

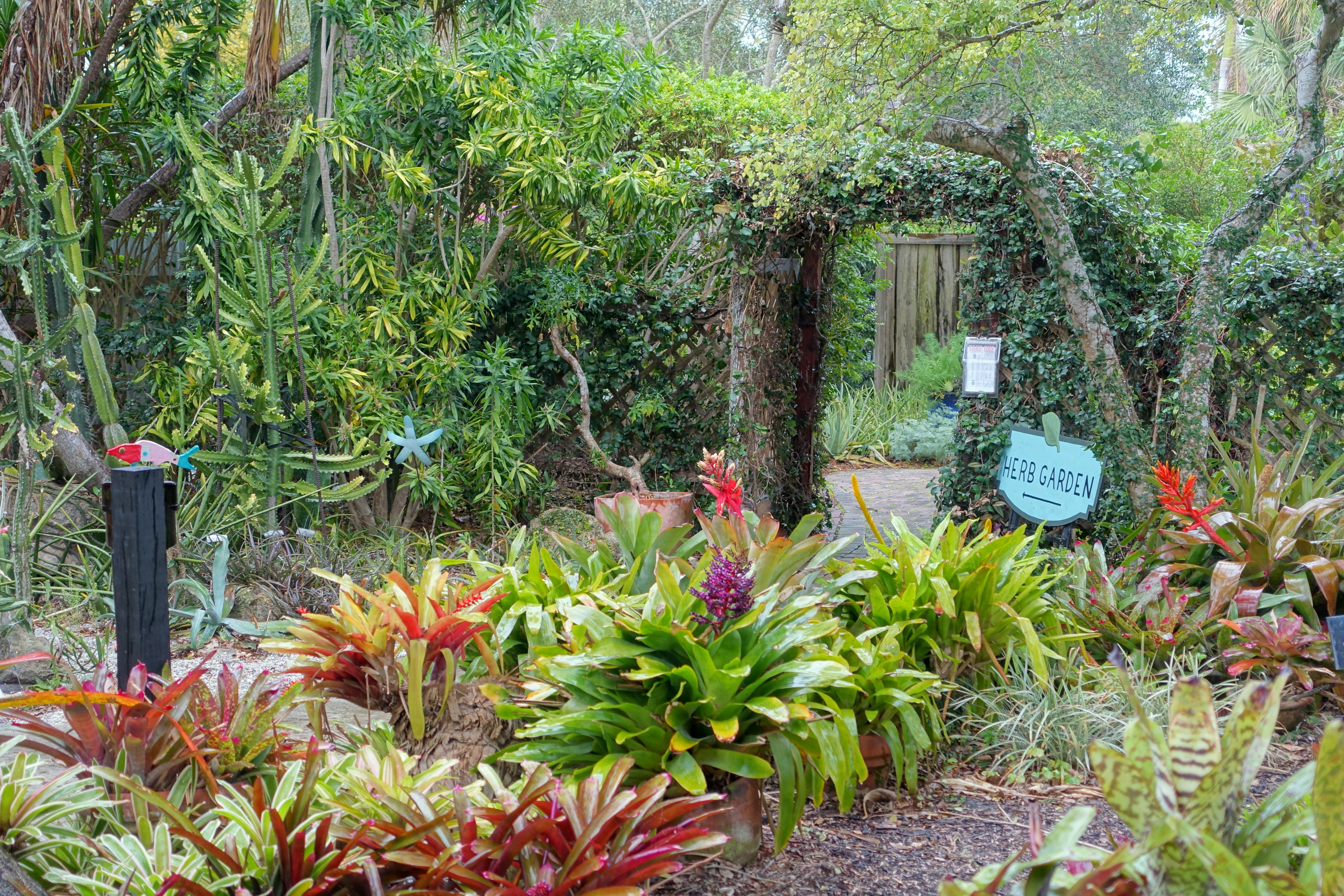
Heathcote Botanical Gardens

Heathcote Botanical Gardens is a five-acre subtropical botanical garden located at 210 Savannah Road, Fort Pierce, Florida, United States. Heathcote is a non-profit, 501 (C)3 educational foundation that bills itself as the "Green Heart of the Treasure Coast." It began in 1960 as the commercial nursery of landscape architect Molly Crimmons and her husband, Jim.

Heathcote Botanical Gardens was established in 1986 when the site was purchased by local citizens with contributions from the City of Fort Pierce, St. Lucie County, the State of Florida and Friends of Heathathcote Botanical Gardens.

== About ==
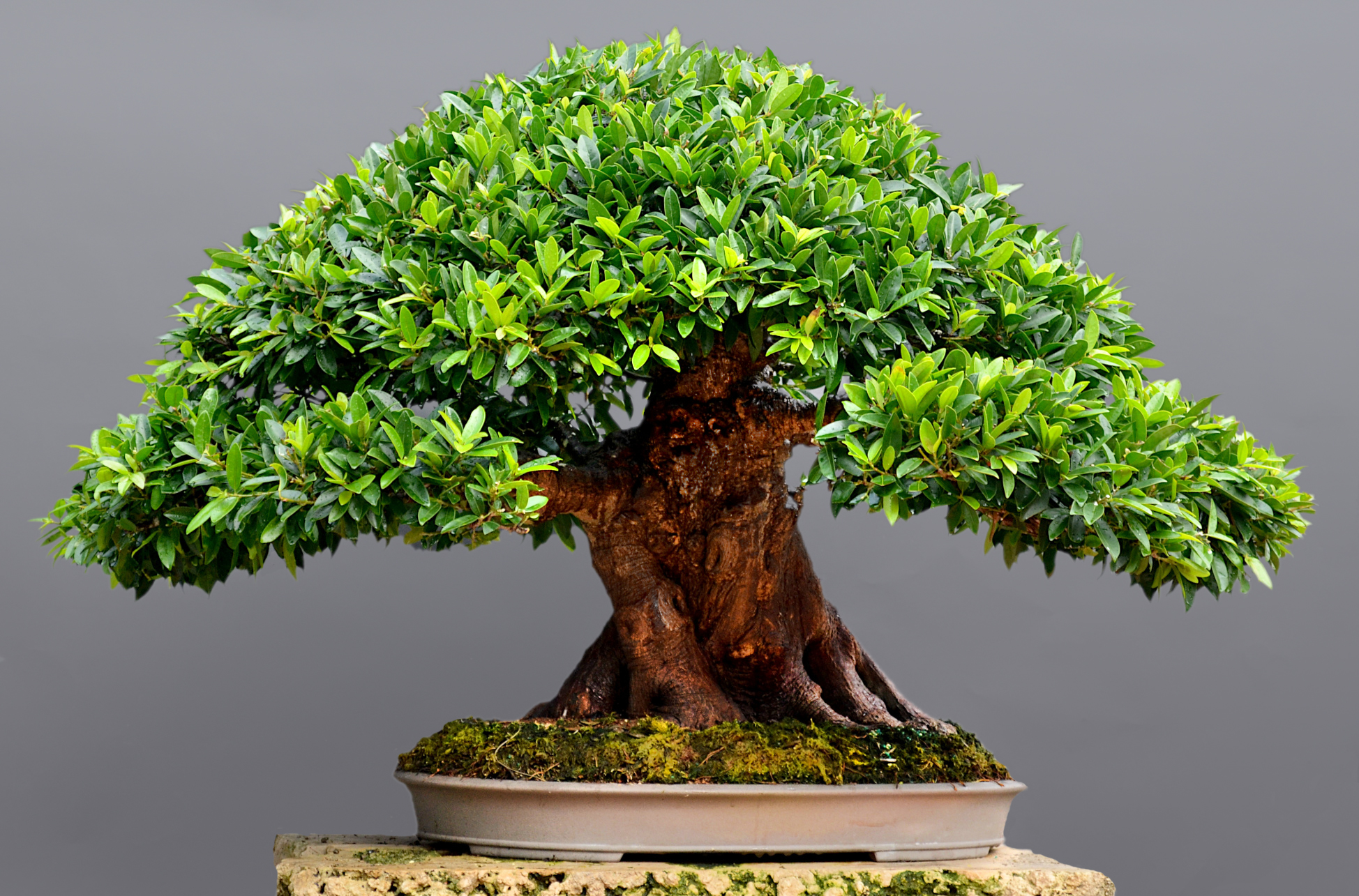
This formal upright Ficus greets visitors entering the main gate to the James J. Smith Bonsai Collection. It is more than four feet four feet (1.2 m) across.

It currently includes a Japanese garden with teahouse, Reflection Garden, Herb Garden, Rainforest Display, Native Plants Garden, Children's Garden, and a Palm and Cycad Walk.

Other garden plants include: bamboo, a banyan tree, bromeliads, Clerodendrums, Clusia rosea, Coccoloba uvifera, Codiaeum sp., crotons, Encephalartos gratus, orchids, Pandanus utilis, Petrea volubilis, philodendrons, pineapple, Podocarpus gracilior, Tillandsias, and Zamia pumila.

The Garden of Lights is a major fundraiser that sees the entire garden decorated with tens of thousands of tiny Christmas lights. It draws more than 10,000 people each year during weekend evenings leading up to Christmas.

The Adams/Peterson Pioneer house is a replica of an 1870 "Cracker"-style home that shows what it was like to live in Old Florida.

== James J. Smith Bonsai Gallery ==
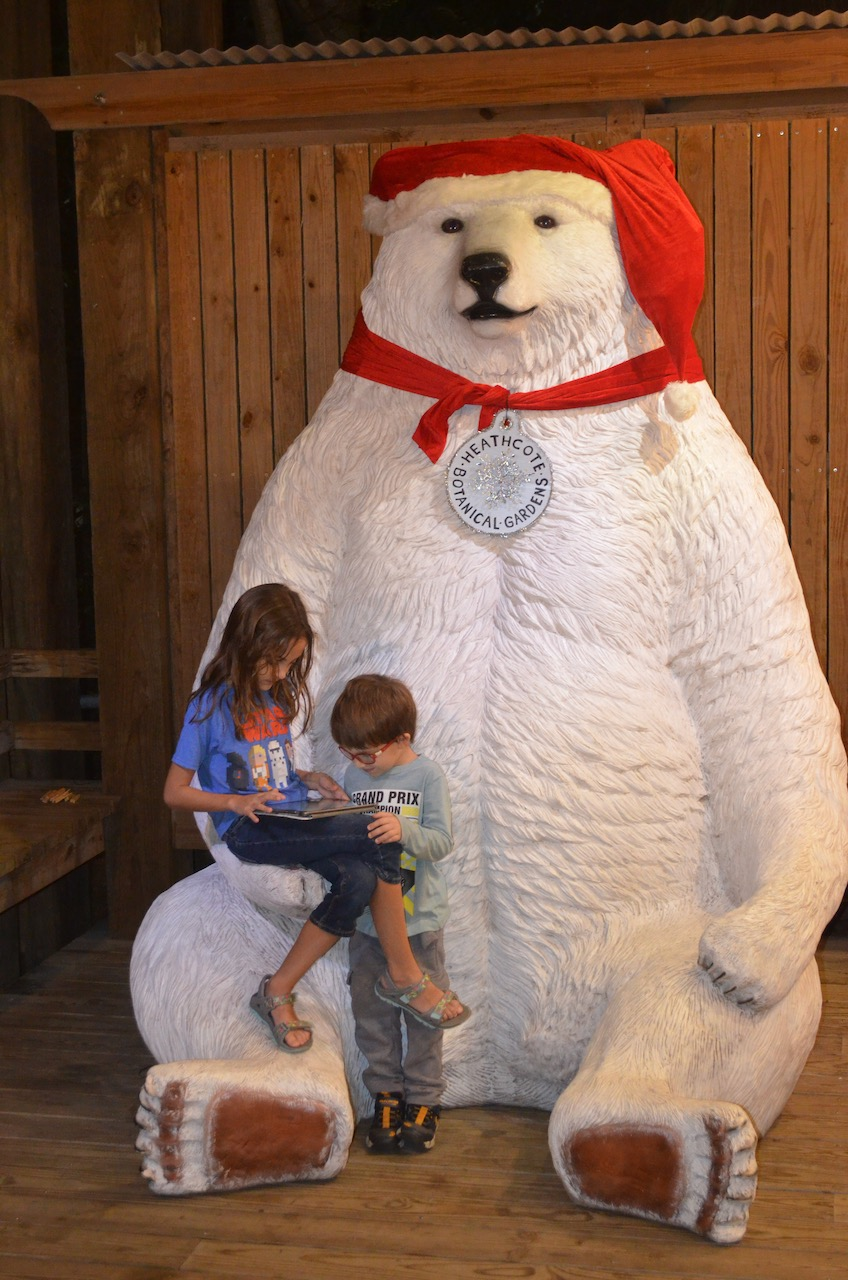
Thousands of visitors flock to the bonsai pavilion during Garden of Lights to have their children's pictures taken with Heathcote the Bear.

Heathcote is most well known for being the home of the James J. Smith Bonsai Collection, the largest public display of bonsai in the country. The collection has more bonsai on year-round display than any other public exhibit in the United States. Although there are 26 species represented in the collection, almost half the trees are species of ficus. The more than 100 specimen bonsai range from a huge buttonwood, estimated to be 200 years old, to a twin-trunk Jaboticaba, originally styled by John Naka in 1973.

James J. Smith was an internationally recognized authority on bonsai who operated a wholesale bonsai nursery in Vero Beach, Florida. He learned from some of the most famous bonsai masters in the world including John Naka and Toshio Saburomaru. For decades, Smith conducted a free monthly workshop at his Durastone Nursery on Old Dixie Highway. He was mentor to several generations of Florida bonsai artists. His bonsai are in numerous important collections around the world, and numerous books picture his trees and discuss his work.

When he was in his 80s, he agreed to give most of his private collection to Heathcote if it could develop a suitable display area. Heathcote conducted a major fundraising campaign and developed a plan for a 10,000-square-foot garden complete with stone stands and a Japanese-influenced pavilion that is a favorite scene for weddings and garden parties. Smith died in 2016.

== See also ==
- List of botanical gardens in the United States
