= Florida Artists Hall of Fame =

Coordinates: 30.438060°N 84.285074°W

Florida Artists Hall of Fame recognizes artists who have made significant contributions to art in Florida. It was established by the Florida Legislature in 1986. There is a Florida Artists Hall of Fame Wall on the Plaza Level in the rotunda of the Florida Capitol. The Florida Council on Arts and Culture reviews nominations annually and makes recommendations to the Florida Secretary of State. No more than two inductees are selected in any year until 2012 when four inductees were added.

In 1986, the Hall was established by the Florida Legislature. It provides recognition to persons, living or dead, who "made significant contributions to the arts in Florida either as performing or practicing artists in individual disciplines." The awards recipients show diversity of artistic accomplishment in the state's "cultural tapestry." Inductions take place each March during the Florida Heritage Awards. Each honoree receives a commemorative bronze sculpture. The sculpture, La Florida was created by Enzo Torcoletti.

== Alphabetical list of inductees ==
Year	Name	City	Lifetime	Artform
2004	Alfred Hair and the Florida Highwaymen	Fort Pierce, Florida	1941–1970	Folk artists
1993	George Abbott	Miami Beach, Florida	1887–1995	Thespian and theater impresario
1993	A. E. "Bean" Backus	Fort Pierce, Florida	1906–1990	Artist
2024	Roger Bansemer	St. Augustine, Florida	1948–	Visual Artist
2018	The Bellamy Brothers	Darby, Florida	Howard: 1946– , David: 1950–	Singers/Songwriters/Recording Artists
2022	Wayne Brady	Orlando, Florida	1972–	Actor/Performer
2012	Jacqueline Brice	Jupiter, Florida	1935–	Painter
2016	Romero Britto	Miami, Florida	1963–	Visual Artist
2012	Robert C. Broward	Jacksonville, Florida	1926–2015	Architect
2012	Ricou Browning	Tallahassee, Florida	1930–2023	Underwater film actor and director
2000	Jimmy Buffett	Key West, Florida	1946–2023	Musician
2002	Fernando Bujones	Miami, Florida	1955–2005	Dancer
1998	Clyde Butcher	Ochopee, Florida	1942–	Photographer
1992	Ray Charles	Greenville, Florida	1930–2004	Musician
2024	George Clinton	Tallahassee, Florida	1941–	Musician
2023	Nilda Comas	Fort Lauderdale, Florida	1953–	Sculptor
2020	Rita Coolidge	Tallahassee, Florida	1945–	Musician
2024	Xavier Cortada	Miami, Florida	1964–	Visual Artist
2009	Harry Crews	Gainesville, Florida	1935–2012	Writer
2003	Earl Cunningham	St. Augustine, Florida	1893–1977	Folk artist
2017	Billy Dean	Quincy, Florida	1962–	Singer/Songwriter
2010	Bo Diddley	Archer, Florida	1928–2008	Blues musician
2016	Jane Davis Doggett	Jupiter Island, Florida	1929–2023	Artist & Environmental Graphic Designer
1993	Marjory Stoneman Douglas	Coconut Grove, Florida	1890–1998	Author
2013	Gloria Estefan	Miami, Florida	1957–	Singer and songwriter
2017	Don Felder	Gainesville, Florida	1947–	Musician/Guitarist
1988	George Firestone	Miami, Florida	1931–2012	Politician who supported arts
2021	Tom Fitz	Jupiter, Florida	1958–	Cameraman/Director/Producer
2015	Carlisle Floyd	Tallahassee, Florida	1926–2021	Opera composer
2003	William P. Foster	Tallahassee, Florida	1919–2010	Marching band director and innovator
2021	Mary GrandPré	Sarasota, Florida	1954–	Illustrator/Painter
1992	Duane Hanson	Davie, Florida	1925–1996	Artist/ sculptor of human figures
1995	Martin Johnson Heade	St. Augustine, Florida	1819–1904	Painter of nature
2014	Bruce Helander	West Palm Beach, Florida	1947–	Collage artist, painter, arts critic and curator
1987	Ernest Hemingway	Key West, Florida	1899–1961	Author
2019	Bertie Higgins	Tarpon Springs, Florida	1944–	Singer/Songwriter/Recording Artist
2017	Lee Bennett Hopkins	Cape Coral, Florida	1938–2019	Poet/Anthologist
1990	Zora Neale Hurston	Eatonville, Florida	1891–1960	Folklorist, historian, and novelist
2011	James F. Hutchinson	Stuart, Florida	1932–2023	Painter
2019	George Inness, Jr.	Tarpon Springs, Florida	1854–1926	Painter
2002	Lou Jacobs	Sarasota, Florida	1903–1992	Circus clown
2000	James Weldon Johnson	Jacksonville, Florida	1871–1938	Writer
2006	John Rosamond Johnson	Jacksonville, Florida	1873–1954	Composer and singer during the Harlem Renaissance
2005	Stetson Kennedy	Beluthahatchee, Florida	1916–2011	Journalist
2022	E.L. "Buster" Kenton	Kissimmee, Florida	1920–1991	Painter/Illustrator
2000	Elaine L. Konigsburg	Ponte Vedra Beach, Florida	1930–2013	Author and illustrator
2020	Guy LaBree	Hollywood, Florida	1941–2015	Painter
1999	Doris Leeper	New Smyrna Beach, Florida	1929–2000	Painter and sculptor
2022	Sandra Lloyd	Port Orange, Florida	1936–	Painter
2007	Lawrence Hankins "Hank" Locklin	McLellan, Florida	1918–2009	Songwriter
2024	Lynyrd Skynyrd	Jacksonville, Florida	1964–	Musicians
1991	John D. MacDonald	Sarasota, Florida	1916–1986	Writer
1996	Will McLean	Chipley, Florida	1919–1990	Folk singer/ songwriter
2001	Addison Mizner	Boca Raton, Florida	1872–1933	Architect
2019	Ann Norton	West Palm Beach, Florida	1905–1982	Sculptor
1994	Ralph Hubbard Norton	West Palm Beach, Florida	1875–1953	Art collector and museum founder
2008	Victor Nuñez	Tallahassee, Florida	1945–	Film director
2014	Tom Petty	Gainesville, Florida	1950–2017	Singer and songwriter
2004	Albin Polasek	Winter Park, Florida	1879–1965	Sculptor
2006	W. Stanley "Sandy" Proctor	Tallahassee, Florida	1939–	Sculptor
1991	Robert Rauschenberg	Captiva, Florida	1925–2008	Painter
1987	Marjorie Kinnan Rawlings	Cross Creek, Florida	1896–1953	Author
1993	Burt Reynolds	Jupiter, Florida	1936–2018	Actor
1987	John N. Ringling	Sarasota, Florida	1866–1936	Circus empresario
1998	Gamble Rogers	St. Augustine, Florida	1937–1991	Folk musician and storyteller
2012	Louis Roney	Winter Park, Florida	1921–2017	Opera singer
2001	James Rosenquist	Aripeka, Florida	1933–2017	Artist
2022	Bob Ross	Daytona Beach, Florida	1942–1995	Television Personality/Painter
2008	Augusta Savage	Green Cove Springs, Florida	1892–1962	Sculptor
1999	Patrick D. Smith	Merritt Island, Florida	1927–2014	Author
2017	Jim Stafford	Winter Haven, Florida	1944–	Musician/Entertainer
2010	Christopher M. Still	Tarpon Springs, Florida	1961–	Painter
2013	Frank Thomas	Lake Wales, Florida	1943–2020	Musician
2009	Mel Tillis	Silver Springs, Florida	1932–2017	Musician
2011	Johnny Tillotson	Jacksonville, Florida	1938–	Singer and songwriter
1994	Jerry N. Uelsmann	Gainesville, Florida	1934–2022	Photographer
1997	Edward Villella	Miami, Florida	1936–	Ballet dancer
1994	Hiram D. Williams	Gainesville, Florida	1917–2003	Painter and professor of art
1989	Tennessee Williams	Key West, Florida	1911–1983	Author
2013	Laura Woodward	Palm Beach, Florida	1834–1926	Painter
2018	Purvis Young	Miami, Florida	1943–2010	Visual Artist
1994	Ellen Taaffe Zwilich	Miami, Florida	1939–	Music composer

== See also ==
- Great Floridians
- List of music museums
