= Hiram D. Williams =

American painter

Hiram Draper Williams (February 11, 1917 – January 5, 2003) was an American painter and professor of art at the University of Florida in Gainesville, Florida. Williams was inducted into the Florida Artist Hall of Fame. His work is included in the collections of the Whitney Museum of American Art, the Museum of Modern Art, the Guggenheim Museum, all of New York, and the National Gallery of Art in Washington, D.C.

Williams donated a collection of his work to University of Florida's Harn Museum and the Smithsonian has a collection of his papers in their Archives of American Art from 1955 to 1965. Williams was inducted into the Florida Artists Hall of Fame in 1994.

Williams' Notes for a Young Painter, a collections of thoughts directed at beginning artists, first printed in 1963 and reprinted in 1984, was required reading at major art schools and academies for generations.
