= Old Fort Pierce City Hall =

- U.S. National Register of Historic Places
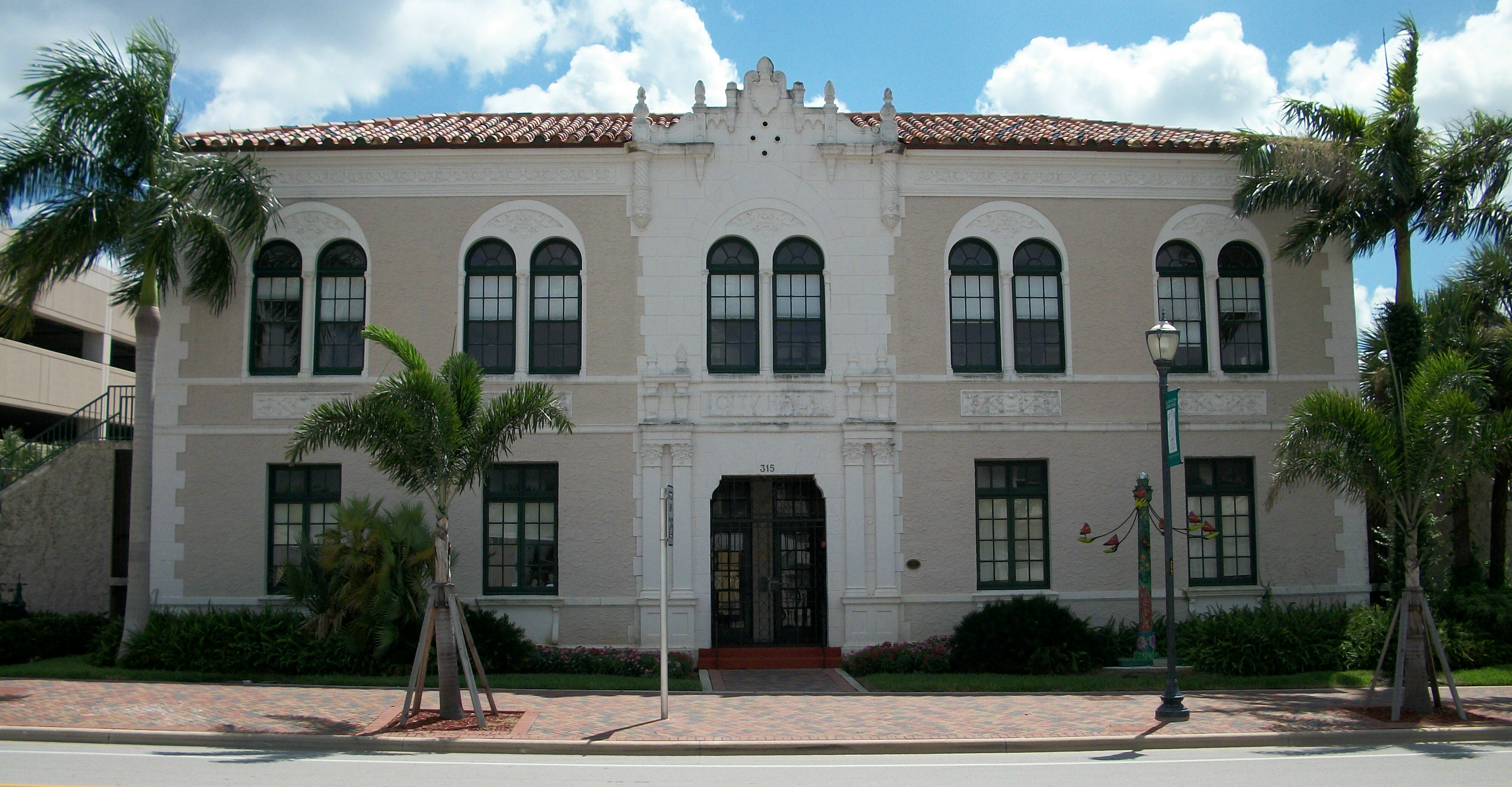

- Location within Florida Location within the United States
- Location: 315 Avenue A Fort Pierce, Florida 34950
- Coordinates: 27°26′52″N 80°19′35″W
- Built: 1925
- Architect: William Hatcher
- Architectural style: Mediterranean Revival, Italian Renaissance
- NRHP reference No.: 01001338
- Added to NRHP: December 7, 2001

Located at 315 Avenue A, the Old Fort Pierce City Hall (also known as the Old City Hall) is a historic building in downtown Fort Pierce, Florida. Designed with both Mediterranean Revival Style and Italian Renaissance Revival elements by architect William Hatcher, the structure was built in 1925 at the peak of the Florida land boom by builder C.E. Cahow.

The building was used as the Fort Pierce City Hall until 1983. It was restored in 1995 for $500,000, being the first of many of Fort Pierce's successes in preservation. On December 7, 2001, it was added to the U.S. National Register of Historic Places.

== See also ==
- Sunrise Theatre: a nearby structure also built by C.E. Cahow
