= A. E. Backus =

American painter (1906–1990)

- Born: Albert Ernest Backus; January 3, 1906; Fort Pierce, Florida, U.S.
- Died: June 6, 1990 (aged 84); Fort Pierce, Florida, U.S.
- Other names: Beanie; Bean
- Occupation: Artist
- Years active: 1920s–1990
- Spouse: Patricia Hutchinson (m. 1950; died 1955)

Albert Ernest Backus (January 3, 1906 – June 6, 1990), also known as Bean or Beanie Backus, was an American artist famous for his vivid Florida landscape paintings.

== Early life ==
In 1899, Bachus' mother and father, Josephine "Ma" Backus (née Sheridan) and George "Pa" Backus, moved to Fort Pierce, Florida from their home in Newark, New Jersey with their three children, Rodman Thereaux "Tod" Backus, Elizabeth "Bess" Backus Hunter, and George "Dord" Backus. Albert Ernest Backus was born on January 3, 1906. He was named after a family friend, Albert Hoofnagle, and the doctor who delivered him as a baby and cared for him when he became critically ill, Dr. Ernest E. Van Landingham.

His nickname, originally "Beanpot," was bestowed upon him as an infant by a neighbor. Eventually his nickname was shortened to Bean or Beanie, which stuck with him for the remainder of his life. The fifth Backus child, Laura "Titter" Backus Nottage, was born a few years later.

Backus was raised in Fort Pierce, Florida. Because Backus was sickly as a toddler, diagnosed with bronchial pneumonia and peritonitis), his mother gave him a small set of watercolor paints to occupy his time restfully. He painted with watercolors until the fifth grade, and then began painting with oils.

Between the ages of 11 and 15, he worked at his father's boat shop, Goodwin and Backus, where he would clean, putty, and paint boats. While in junior high and high school, Backus became a freelance sign painter and operated a small business with his brother George until finding full-time employment as the resident artist at the Sunrise Theatre between 1930 and 1938. At the Sunrise Theatre, Backus would paint scenes from coming attractions on Upson board. The theatre also had shows by renowned Hollywood stars like Clark Gable, Greta Garbo, Sally Rand, and Robert Taylor, for whom Backus would use pastels to create portraits on velour paper adhered to wallboard to promote their guest appearances.

In 1938, after Backus left the Sunrise Theatre, he opened a studio with Don Blanding in the Arcade Building of downtown Fort Pierce.

== Career ==
=== Early influences ===
Beanie was mostly self-taught, although he did enjoy two summer stints at the Parsons School of Design in New York City in 1924–25. Backus always earned his living through his artistic talent, first as a commercial artist painting signs, billboards and theater marquees, and later encouraged by Dorothy Binney Palmer, his first true patron, to pursue his landscape paintings as a full-time occupation. He painted vivid Florida landscapes, including beautiful sunsets, beach and river scenes, and the spectacular vistas of the Everglades.

=== The War Years (1942–1945) ===
Shortly after WWII started, Backus volunteered for the Navy and completed his training at Naval Station Norfolk in Norfolk, Virginia. Beginning in 1942, he began his service as quartermaster, third class, aboard the troop carrier USS Hermitage, where his routine task was correcting nautical charts. He was also the staff artist for the ship's daily newspaper Scuttlebutt.

The skipper of the USS Hermitage, Captain Rockwell Townsend, was an amateur sculptor and befriended Backus as a fellow artist. With Townsend's support, Backus spent his free time painting the various ports where the ship docked. Much like a visual journal of his travels, Backus recorded his journeys through his artwork. He painted in both watercolor and oils the scenes of the South Pacific, the California coast, and the European ports he visited.

=== Studios ===
==== The Old Studio (1946-1959) ====
After WWII, Backus returned home to Fort Pierce and bought his father's boat shop on Moore's Creek, which he turned into an art studio. Later known as "the Old Studio," it was during this time that Backus’ career as an artist turned into a serious profession with national acclaim. For example, Backus was commissioned in 1948 to paint murals for the West Side State Bank in Green Bay, Wisconsin. Locally, his reputation flourished. Backus began teaching Saturday art classes for children in 1952, charging 50 cents per lesson. He continued these lessons for another ten years, even after moving into the New Studio.

In 1959, Backus sold the property back to the City of Fort Pierce for an expansion to the power plant.

==== The New Studio (1960–1990) ====
By the time Backus moved into the New Studio, he was enjoying a prolific career as an artist. The building itself assumed many identities in its lifetime before Backus turned it into his home and studio—built in 1896 by Dr. C. P. Platts, the first doctor of Fort Pierce, and later owned by the same doctor who delivered Backus as a baby, the two-story frame house was previously used as a welfare home and a church. As was his policy at the Old Studio, Backus opened his door to any visitor who came by. His younger sister Laura recalled him saying "What if someone who needed a place to stay came by and knocked on the door and I couldn't hear them? With the door open, they can come in and eat if they're hungry and have a place to sleep if they're tired."

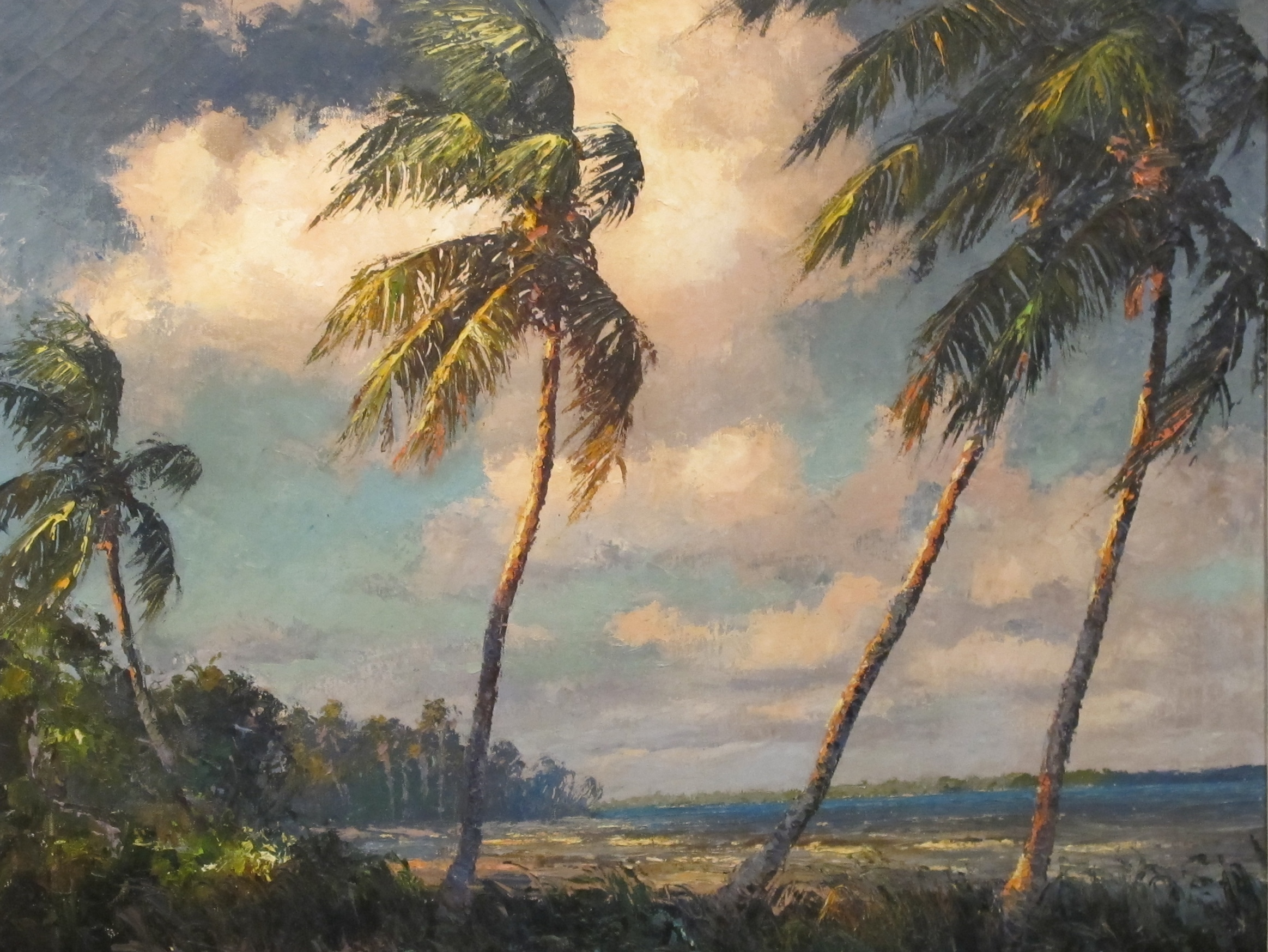
Backus used his palette knife to make this painting in the 1960s

=== Impressionistic works ===
Many of Backus' earlier paintings dating from the 1930s to the late 1960s are categorized as being more impressionistic than most of his later works and were often done with a palette knife. Paint was applied to the canvas or board with generous strokes.

=== Later works ===
Later in his life, he created a series of scenes of the Caribbean focusing on the Bahamas, Haiti and—most prolifically—his second home in Jamaica. Backus' style became more refined, and relied increasingly on the brush rather than the palette knife.

==== The Florida Highwaymen ====
Backus is credited for inspiring and mentoring a group of 26 African American landscape artists who became known collectively as The Highwaymen. In the 1950s, Backus was introduced to 14-year-old Alfred Hair by a friend, the local high school art teacher Zanobia Jefferson, and agreed to formally train Hair in the art of painting. During the same period, 19-year-old African American artist Harold Newton also met Backus and was convinced by him to paint landscapes rather than religious scenes. Hair and Newton's involvement in painting soon attracted a group of a "young, energetic" artists who painted large quantities of brilliantly colorful impressionistic landscapes that they each sold from their cars. Several Highwaymen artists, including Charles Walker, Livingston Roberts, James Gibson, George Buckner and Ellis Buckner have also credited Backus' tutelage and their visits to watch Backus paint at his studio with their growth as painters.

== Legacy ==
=== The Backus School ===
Backus's work inspired the art movement known as The Backus School, described by expressive and atmospheric paintings of southeastern Florida landscapes. Over the course of his life, Backus mentored many students of art on an informal basis. Because of his open-door policy and willingness to engage with any interested individual, there are no extant records of his work as a teacher or a comprehensive list of his students. It is known, however, that there are at least 45 artists who studied under Backus’ tutelage. According to Sherrie Johnson, a Backus student from 1983 to 1990, “Bean’s students didn’t pay for their lessons. He shared, for free, his vast artistic knowledge with anyone who asked." Among the most notable of Backus’ students are fellow Florida Artist Hall of Fame inductees Alfred Hair (inducted in 2004), one of the founding members of the Florida Highwaymen, and Jacqueline Brice (inducted in 2012).

== Personal life ==
Backus married Patricia Nell "Patsy" Hutchinson on April 9, 1950. After only five years of marriage, Patsy died at age 29 from complications following open heart surgery for rheumatic heart disease.

Backus was known for always having music playing in his home. He often had his record player playing, and some times even had Jazz musicians jamming. He was known to keep company with Zora Neale Hurston. The two were known to be very good friends and both had a fervent passion for the youth of the Fort Pierce area. He liked to keep a lively conversation and often quoted Waldo E. Sexton: "I'd rather be a liar than a bore." Upon his death in 1990, Backus left a half-finished oil painting now displayed in the A.E. Backus Museum & Gallery.

== A.E Backus Museum and Gallery ==
Much of Backus’ work is now on display at the A. E. Backus Museum & Gallery in Fort Pierce, Florida.
