= Arcade Building (Fort Pierce, Florida) =

- U.S. National Register of Historic Places
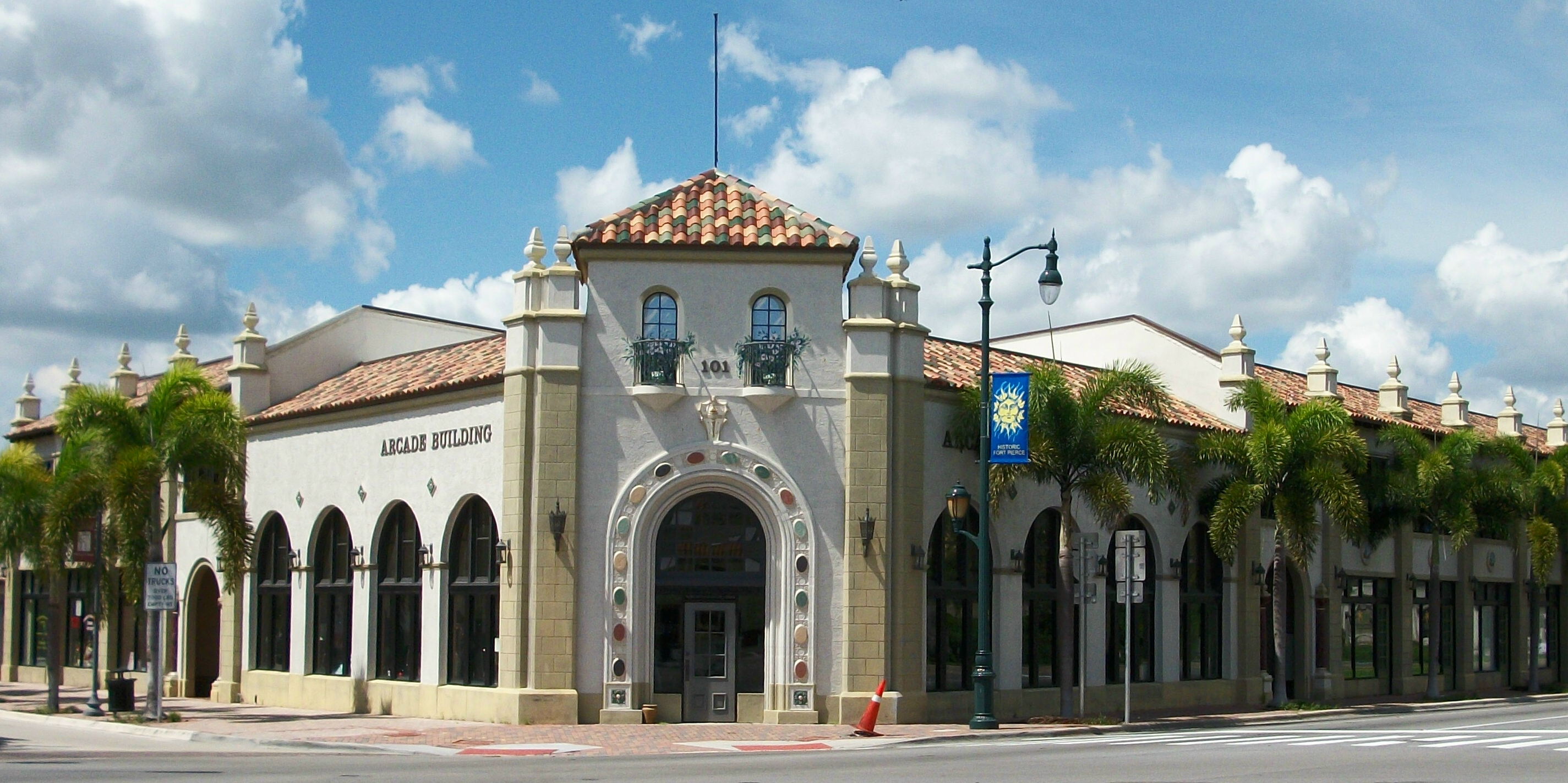

- Location within Florida Location within the United States
- Location: 101 US 1, N. Fort Pierce, Florida
- Coordinates: 27°26′49″N 80°19′37″W
- Built: 1926
- Architect: Willis Irwin
- Architectural style: Spanish Colonial Revival
- NRHP reference No.: 01001085
- Added to NRHP: October 12, 2001

Built in 1926, the Arcade Building is a historic building in downtown Fort Pierce, Florida. It is located at 101 U.S. 1, North. Built in a Spanish Colonial Revival style, when built it was the largest commercial building in Fort Pierce. On October 12, 2001, the structure was listed on the U.S. National Register of Historic Places. The building was used for retail and office space until the 1980s when a fire damaged a third of the building.
