= Harold Newton =

American landscape artist

- Born: October 30, 1934; Gifford, Florida, U.S.
- Died: June 27, 1994 (aged 59); Gifford, Florida, U.S.
- Occupation: Painter
- Known for: A member of Florida Highwaymen
- Spouse: Dorothy Newton
- Children: 9

Harold Newton (October 30, 1934 – June 27, 1994) was an American landscape artist. He was a founding member of the Florida Highwaymen, a group of fellow African American landscape artists. Newton and the other Highwaymen were influenced by the work of Florida painter A.E. Backus. Newton depicted Florida’s coastlines and wetlands. Most of his paintings were of Florida landscapes.

Newton was successful in a time of racial segregation and disenfranchisement.

== Personal life ==
Newton died on June 27 1994 in Gifford, Florida. He was 59 years old. At the time of his death, he was married to his wife, Dorothy. He had 1 son and 8 daughters.
