= A. E. Backus Museum & Gallery =

Art museum in Fort Pierce, Florida, U.S.

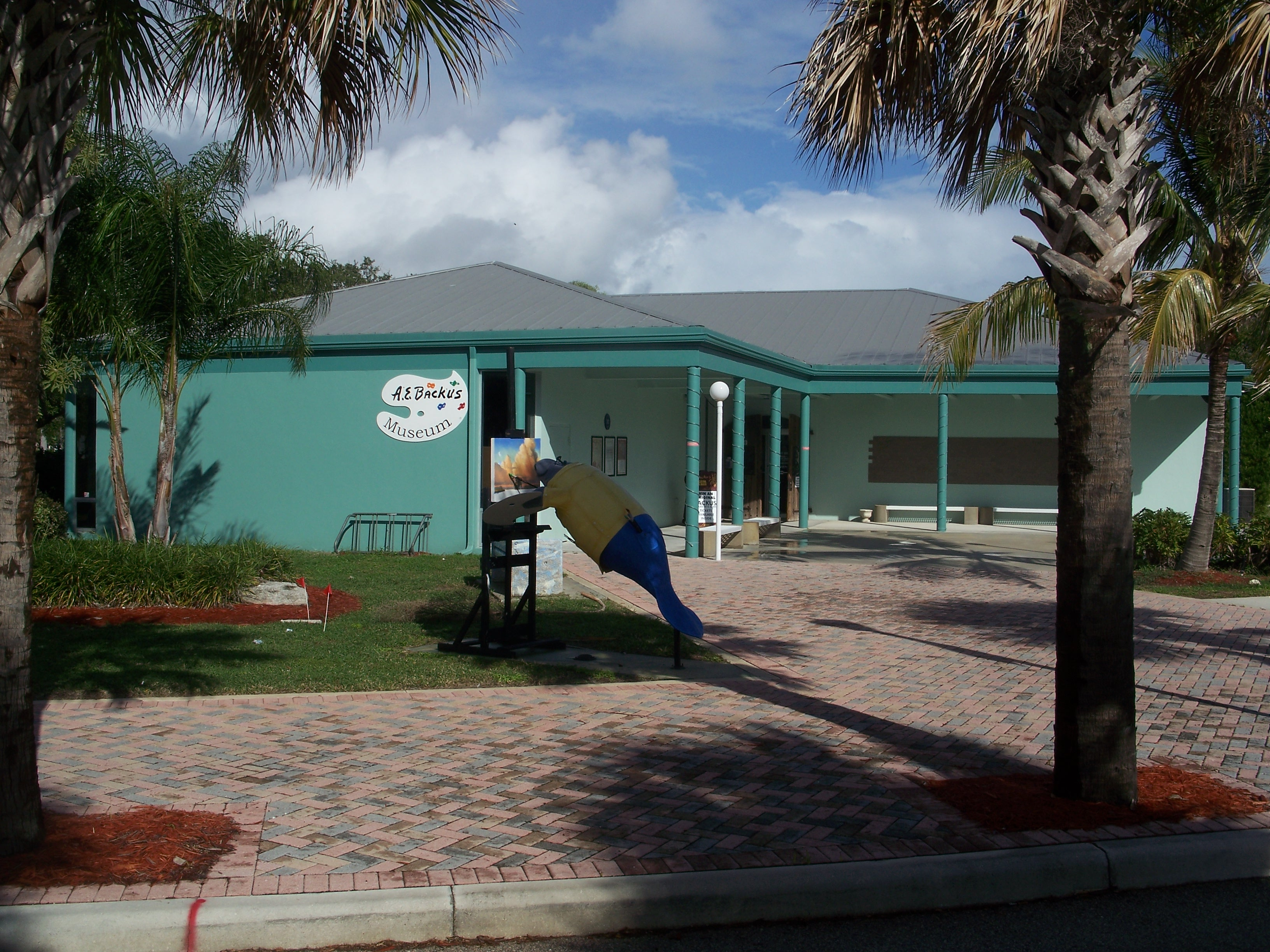

- Location within Florida Location within the United States
- Established: 1960
- Location: 500 North Indian River Drive; Fort Pierce, Florida
- Coordinates: 27.45245°N 80.32407°W
- Type: Art
- Director: J. Marshall Adams
- Website: www.backusmuseum.org

The A. E. Backus Museum & Gallery is located at 500 North Indian River Drive, Fort Pierce, Florida. This museum houses artwork by A. E. Backus and other Florida artists. The museum contains the largest public collection of paintings by Backus, a preeminent Florida landscape painter.

The A.E. Backus Museum & Gallery, an 8,000 sq. ft. public visual arts facility, was established in 1960 by Backus and a group of local art enthusiasts. The museum is dedicated to presenting and collecting works by Backus and the original Florida Highwaymen. Four additional exhibition wings feature changing exhibits of artwork by contemporary artists.

== History ==
Established in 1960, the A.E. Backus Museum & Gallery was originally named the Fort Pierce Art Gallery. A.E. Backus, a prominent figure in the Florida arts community who ushered in an era of art and culture into the Indian River area, played a pivotal role in the creation of the institution. The Fort Pierce Art Gallery was loosely modeled after the artist’s Old Studio on the north bank of Moore’s Creek.

When Backus was told by Arthur Shapiro, chairman of the Fort Pierce Arts League, that he needed an art gallery since his Old Studio was demolished in 1959, Backus replied “What the community needs is an art gallery.” Therefore, after successfully raising $12,000 via community donations and earning permission from the Fort Pierce City Commission to construct the facility on city-owned land, the Fort Pierce Art Gallery was built. Kendall P. Starratt was the architect and Ray Lein was the contractor for the building. With Backus as its first director, The Fort Pierce Art Gallery officially opened to the public on May 15, 1961.

In 1975, the gallery was remodeled to remove the structure’s breezeway because the courtyard was exposed to the elements and susceptible to damaging climate conditions, which threatened not only their own collection of artworks, but also thwarted attempts at hosting traveling exhibitions. The gallery installed a skylight to replace the open courtyard and added air conditioning for climate control during renovations.

The gallery was renamed the A.E. “Bean” Backus Gallery after the artist’s death in 1990.

In 2016, the museum underwent further renovations to expand the building by 2,500 sq. ft.

== See also ==
- A.E. Backus
- The Highwaymen
