= Fort Pierce, Florida =

- City
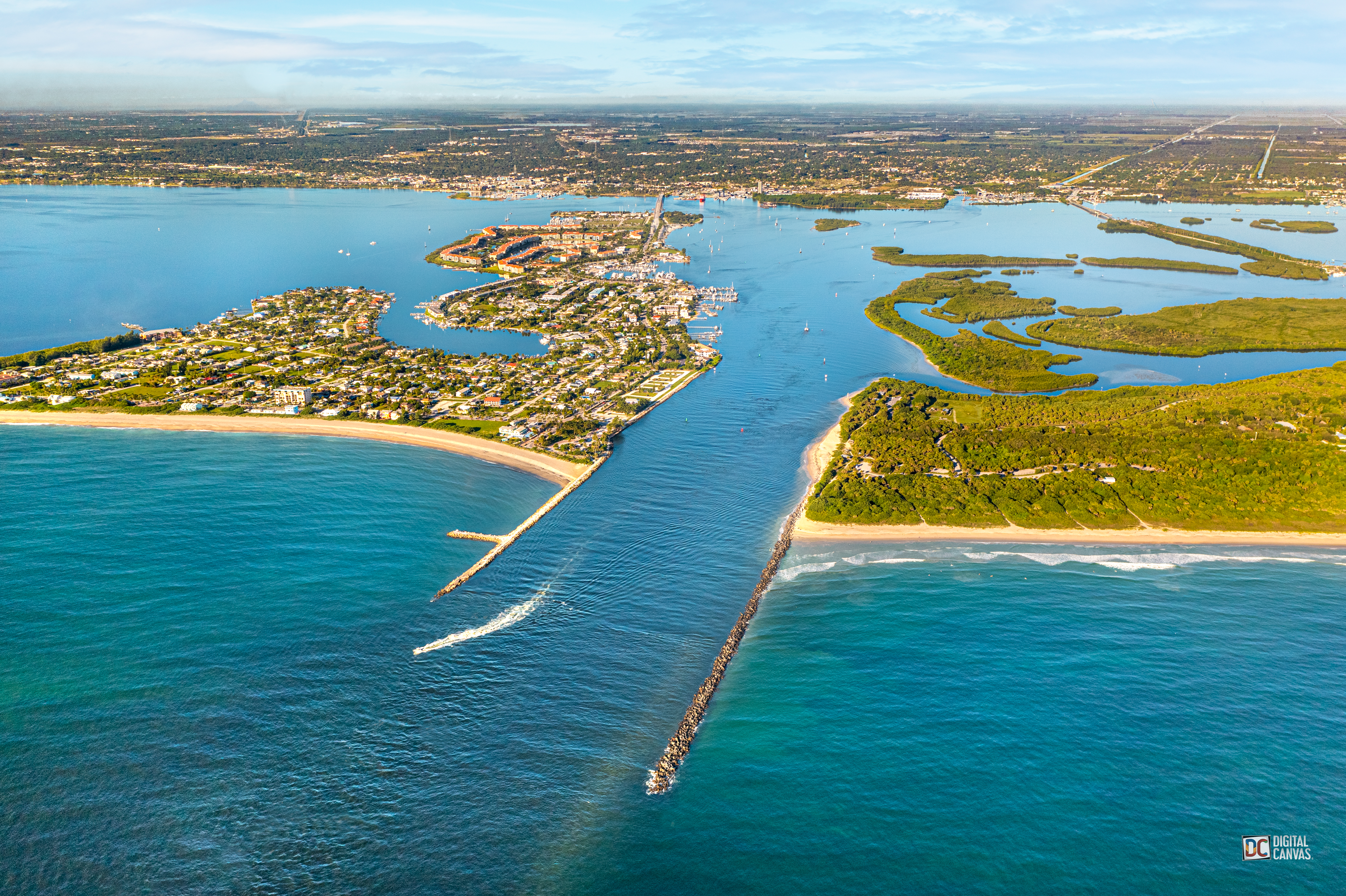
- Fort Pierce Inlet State Park

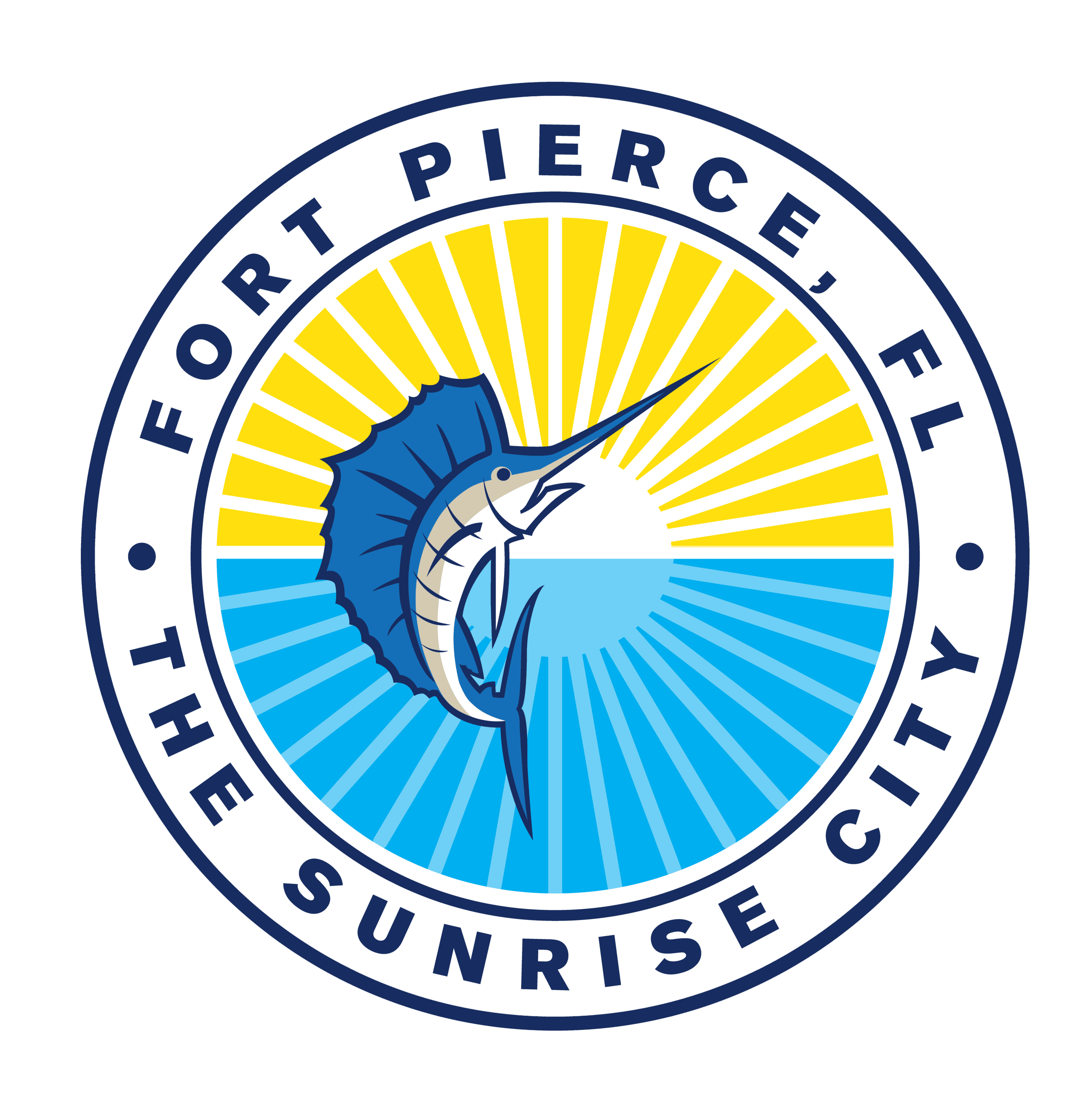
- Seal
- Nickname: The Sunrise City
- Location in St. Lucie County and the state of Florida
- Coordinates: 27°24′15″N 80°23′28″W
- Country: United States
- State: Florida
- County: St. Lucie
- Founded: 1838
- Settled: c. 1860s
- Incorporated (city): 1901

Government
  - Type: Commission-Manager
  - Mayor: Linda Hudson
  - Commissioners: List: Michael Broderick, District 2; Curtis Johnson, Jr. District 1; vacant, District 2; Arnold S. Gaines, District 1
  - City Manager: Richard Chess
  - City Clerk: Linda Cox
  - City Attorney: Andrea Duenas

Area
  - Total: 29.84 sq mi (77.29 km^{2})
  - Land: 23.79 sq mi (61.62 km^{2})
  - Water: 6.05 sq mi (15.67 km^{2})
- Elevation: 20 ft (6.1 m)

Population (2020)
  - Total: 47,297
  - Density: 1,988.0/sq mi (767.59/km^{2})
- Time zone: UTC−5 (Eastern (EST))
  - Summer (DST): UTC−4 (EDT)
- ZIP Codes: 34945–34951, 34954, 34979, 34981-34982
- FIPS code: 12-24300
- GNIS feature ID: 2403646
- Website: cityoffortpierce.com

Fort Pierce is a city in and the county seat of St. Lucie County, Florida, United States. An hour north of West Palm Beach, the city is part of the Treasure Coast region of Florida’s Atlantic Coast. It is also known as the Sunrise City. Per the 2020 census, the population was 47,297.

== History ==
The city was named after the Fort Pierce army post which was built nearby in 1838 during the Second Seminole War, and lasted until 1842. The military post had been named for Benjamin Kendrick Pierce, a career United States Army officer and the brother of President Franklin Pierce.

The first permanent settlement of the current city was during the 1860s. In 1901, the city was officially incorporated as a municipality. It was the largest city on Florida's Atlantic Coast between Daytona Beach and West Palm Beach until 1970, when it was surpassed by Melbourne.

=== Lincoln Park ===
The neighborhood of Lincoln Park, the area north of Moore's Creek, originated as Edgartown. The renowned writer, Zora Neale Hurston lived in the neighborhood. In its heyday, in the 1950s and 1960s, it had a thriving African-American community centered along Avenue D. It was the county's center for African-American businesses and the Lincoln Theater on Avenue D. Lincoln Park Academy is situated in the neighborhood on Avenue I, west of North 17th Street.

=== The Florida Highwaymen ===
Lincoln Park each February hosts a celebration of the artwork of the African-American collective of landscape artists formed in the 1950s. Local artist A.E. Backus mentored many of the artists at his gallery. Several of the artists got their start at Lincoln Park Academy under the leadership of teacher Zanobia Jefferson. Art historian Jim Fitch in 1994 gave the group the name of 'the Highwaymen'. Over the course of 2001 to 2020, Gary Monroe wrote several books on the artwork of the 26 artists known as Highwaymen (including one woman).

=== 2024 tornado ===
On October 9th, 2024, a deadly EF3 tornado would be spawned by Hurricane Milton and occurred within the Fort Pierce area with estimated windspeeds of 160 MPH causing 6 deaths.

== Geography ==
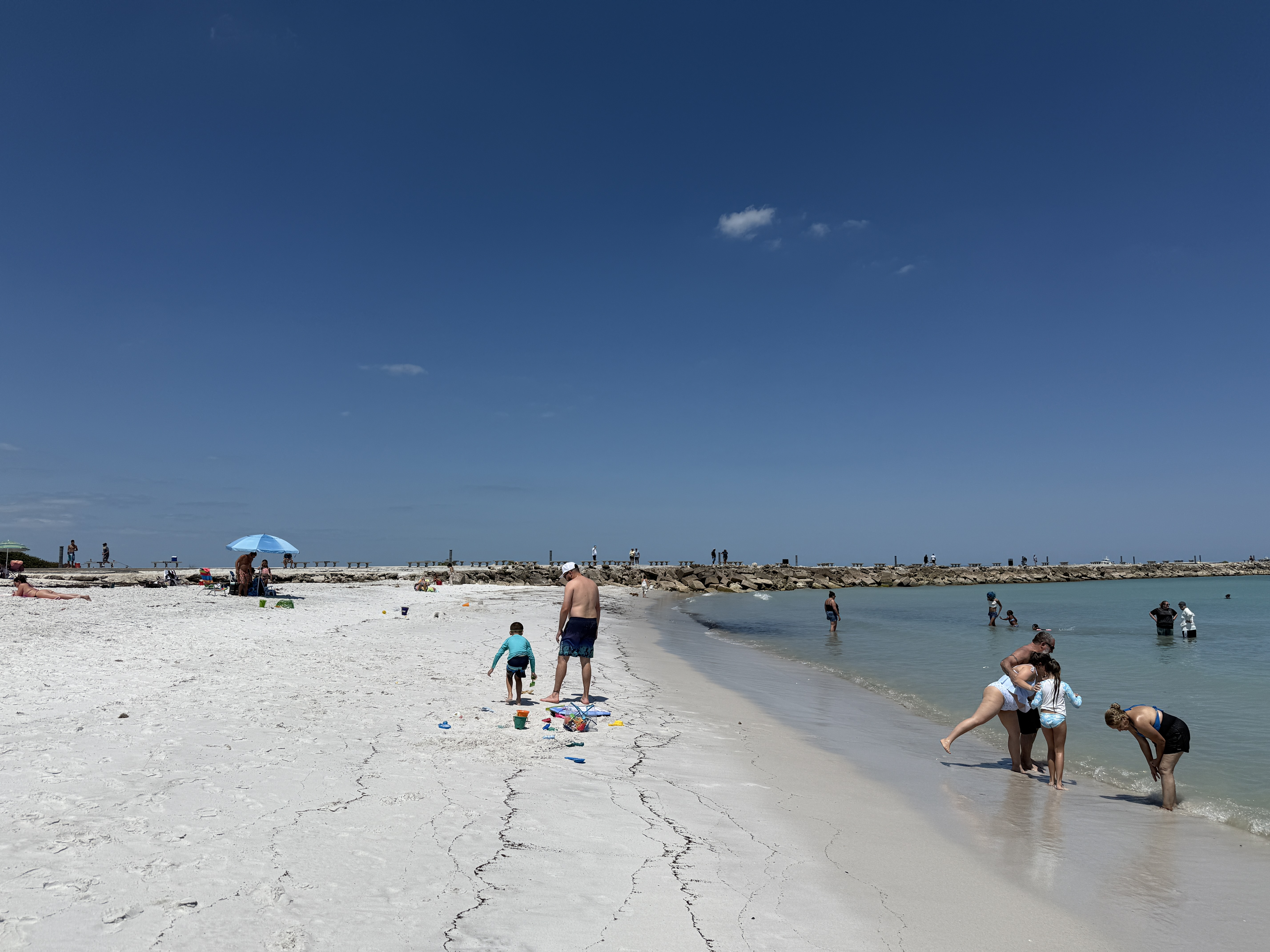
Beach in Fort Pierce

According to the U.S. Census Bureau, the city has a total area of 29.84 mi^{2} (77.29 km^{2}), of which 23.79 square miles (61.62 km^{2}) is land and 6.05 square miles (15.67 km^{2}) of it (20%) is water.

=== Environment ===
==== Shore Protection project ====
According to the U.S. Army Corps of Engineers, The Fort Pierce Beach Shore Protection project includes 1.3 miles (2.1 km) of shore-line running from immediately south of the Fort Pierce Inlet southward to Surfside Park. The project is on a two-year renourishment cycle due to impacts to the beach from the federal navigation project at Fort Pierce Inlet. This two-year renourishment cycle is a much shorter renourishment interval than what is typical for other projects along the east coast of Florida.

The initial construction of the project occurred in 1971, and the ninth nourishment was completed in May 2013. Completion of plans and specifications, advertisement and award for the 10th renourishment contract were completed in FY 2014. The project was scheduled to start mid-February 2015. Sand for the project is dredged from an approved offshore borrow area known as the Capron Shoal and then pumped via a pipeline onto the 1.3 miles (2.1 km) of beach south of the Fort Pierce Inlet. The sponsor, St. Lucie County, is preparing a General Reevaluation Report (GRR) for the project at their own expense that will evaluate extending Federal participation for an additional 50 years. Current Federal participation expires in 2020.

The U.S. Army Corps of Engineers estimates the total cost of the project to be $75.9 million, with an estimated U.S. Federal Government share of $46.4 million. No funding for the project was requested by the U.S. President from the U.S. Congress in Fiscal Year 2016.

==== Ecology ====
The Experimental Oculina Research Reserve preserves the Oculina Banks, a reef of ivory bush coral (Oculina varicosa) off the coast of Fort Pierce, Florida. In 1984, a 92 square-nautical-mile (316 km^{2}) portion of these reefs was designated the "Oculina Habitat Area of Particular Concern". In 1994, the area was closed to all manner of bottom fishing and was redesignated as a research reserve. In 2000, the marine protected area was expanded to 300 square nautical miles (1,030 km^{2}) and prohibited all gears that caused mechanical disruption to the habitat. The city is also known for its large manatee population.

==== Marina ====
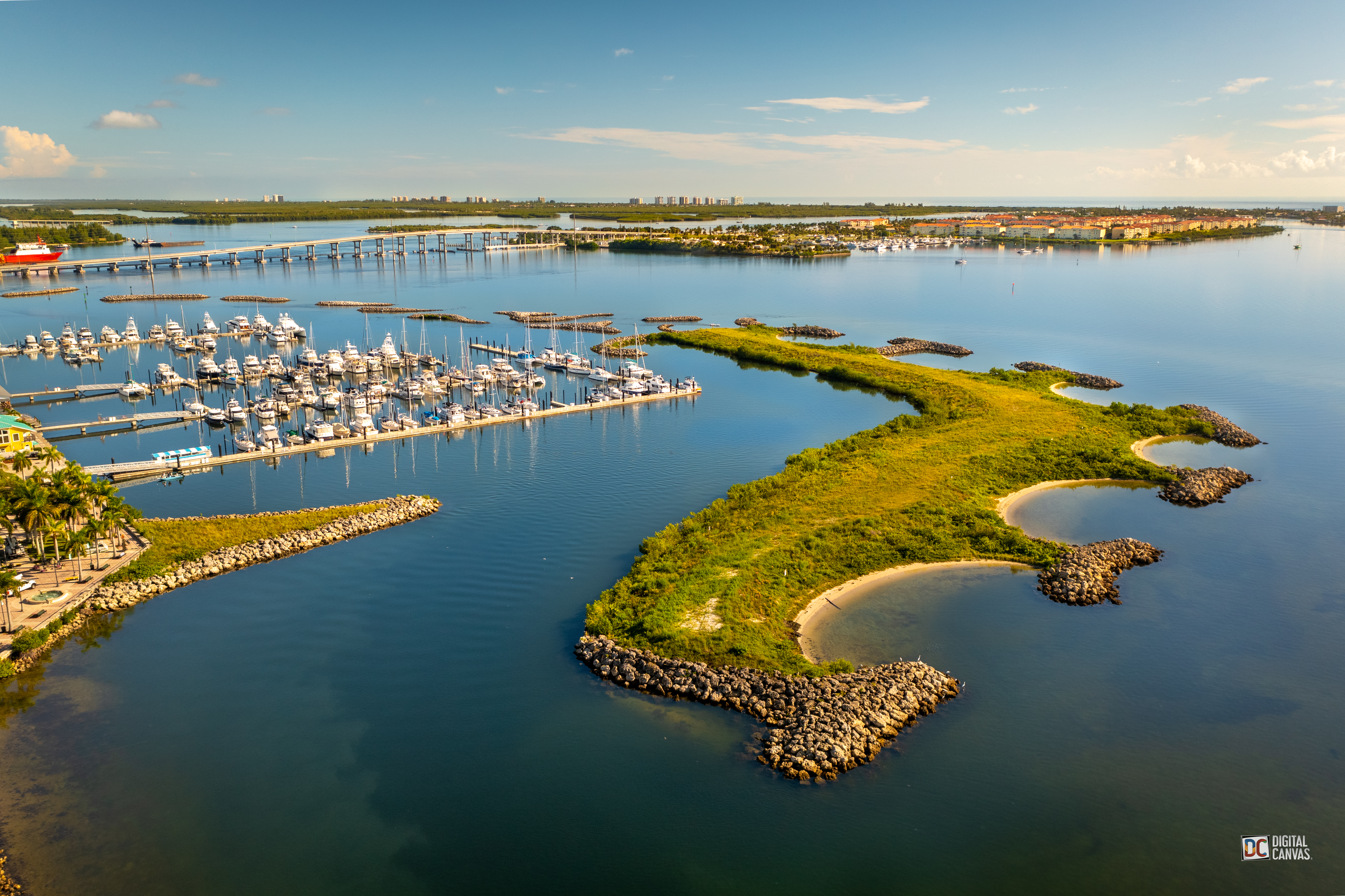
Fort Pierce Marina

Due to the devastation caused at the Fort Pierce City Marina by hurricanes Frances and Jeanne in 2004, FEMA mandated a plan to ensure that the rebuilt facility would be protected from future such events before FEMA would release funding for the repairs. Starting in 2012, construction began to create 12 artificial barrier islands including oyster beds, lime rock artificial reefs, mangrove fringes and coastal dune. The "core" of the islands was constructed of TITANTubes, sometimes referred to as geotextile tubes or geotubes, manufactured by Flint Industries and covered by a coastal marine mattress and then armor stone. The project was completed in 2013 after six years of planning, permitting and construction and a cost of $18 million.

=== Climate ===
Fort Pierce is located in the broad transition zone between a humid subtropical climate (Cfa), which dominates Central Florida, and within the northern extent of the tropical climate typical of South Florida.

Climate data for Fort Pierce, Florida (Treasure Coast International Airport), 1991–2020 normals, extremes 1901–present
Month	Jan	Feb	Mar	Apr	May	Jun	Jul	Aug	Sep	Oct	Nov	Dec	Year
Record high °F (°C)	89 (32)	90 (32)	93 (34)	97 (36)	98 (37)	101 (38)	101 (38)	101 (38)	99 (37)	98 (37)	92 (33)	89 (32)	101 (38)
Mean maximum °F (°C)	84.4 (29.1)	86.4 (30.2)	89.4 (31.9)	91.0 (32.8)	93.4 (34.1)	94.9 (34.9)	95.7 (35.4)	95.0 (35.0)	93.3 (34.1)	90.9 (32.7)	87.0 (30.6)	84.7 (29.3)	97.0 (36.1)
Mean daily maximum °F (°C)	73.4 (23.0)	75.7 (24.3)	78.3 (25.7)	81.9 (27.7)	85.6 (29.8)	88.5 (31.4)	90.3 (32.4)	90.2 (32.3)	88.1 (31.2)	84.2 (29.0)	79.2 (26.2)	75.4 (24.1)	82.6 (28.1)
Daily mean °F (°C)	62.3 (16.8)	64.8 (18.2)	67.4 (19.7)	71.5 (21.9)	76.2 (24.6)	79.9 (26.6)	81.4 (27.4)	81.6 (27.6)	80.3 (26.8)	76.4 (24.7)	69.9 (21.1)	65.5 (18.6)	73.1 (22.8)
Mean daily minimum °F (°C)	51.2 (10.7)	53.9 (12.2)	56.5 (13.6)	61.1 (16.2)	66.8 (19.3)	71.3 (21.8)	72.6 (22.6)	72.9 (22.7)	72.6 (22.6)	68.5 (20.3)	60.6 (15.9)	55.7 (13.2)	63.6 (17.6)
Mean minimum °F (°C)	34.0 (1.1)	37.0 (2.8)	41.3 (5.2)	47.6 (8.7)	56.7 (13.7)	66.5 (19.2)	68.7 (20.4)	69.2 (20.7)	67.2 (19.6)	53.9 (12.2)	44.7 (7.1)	38.1 (3.4)	31.8 (−0.1)
Record low °F (°C)	19 (−7)	23 (−5)	26 (−3)	33 (1)	45 (7)	56 (13)	61 (16)	61 (16)	59 (15)	42 (6)	31 (−1)	19 (−7)	19 (−7)
Average precipitation inches (mm)	2.82 (72)	2.17 (55)	2.88 (73)	3.03 (77)	3.93 (100)	6.69 (170)	5.85 (149)	6.94 (176)	6.27 (159)	5.25 (133)	3.01 (76)	2.33 (59)	51.17 (1,300)
Average precipitation days (≥ 0.01 in)	8.7	7.7	8.1	7.2	9.0	14.2	15.3	15.4	15.4	12.2	10.4	9.3	132.9
Source: NOAA all-time Feb low

== Demographics ==
Historical population
Census	Pop.	Note	%±
1910	1,333		—
1920	2,115		58.7%
1930	4,803		127.1%
1940	8,040		67.4%
1950	13,502		67.9%
1960	25,256		87.1%
1970	29,721		17.7%
1980	33,802		13.7%
1990	36,830		9.0%
2000	37,516		1.9%
2010	41,910		11.7%
2020	47,297		12.9%
U.S. Decennial Census; 2010 2020

=== Racial and ethnic composition ===
Fort Pierce racial composition (Hispanics excluded from racial categories) (NH = Non-Hispanic)
Race	Pop 2010	Pop 2020	% 2010	% 2020
White (NH)	14,639	15,465	35.20%	32.70%
Black or African American (NH)	16,787	17,936	40.36%	37.92%
Native American or Alaska Native (NH)	107	86	0.26%	0.18%
Asian (NH)	337	472	0.81%	1.00%
Pacific Islander or Native Hawaiian (NH)	20	15	0.05%	0.03%
Some other race (NH)	83	273	0.20%	0.58%
Two or more races/Multiracial (NH)	613	1,450	1.47%	3.07%
Hispanic or Latino (any race)	9,004	11,600	21.65%	24.53%
Total	41,590	47,297	100.00%	100.00%

=== 2020 census ===
As of the 2020 census, Fort Pierce had a population of 47,297. The median age was 38.7 years. 24.2% of residents were under the age of 18 and 18.6% of residents were 65 years of age or older. For every 100 females there were 94.7 males, and for every 100 females age 18 and over there were 90.9 males age 18 and over.

99.8% of residents lived in urban areas, while 0.2% lived in rural areas.

There were 18,613 households in Fort Pierce, of which 31.2% had children under the age of 18 living in them. Of all households, 32.3% were married-couple households, 22.9% were households with a male householder and no spouse or partner present, and 36.6% were households with a female householder and no spouse or partner present. About 31.3% of all households were made up of individuals and 14.2% had someone living alone who was 65 years of age or older. There were 10,005 families residing in the city.

There were 21,769 housing units, of which 14.5% were vacant. The homeowner vacancy rate was 2.5% and the rental vacancy rate was 7.7%.

Racial composition as of the 2020 census
Race	Number	Percent
White	18,016	38.1%
Black or African American	18,230	38.5%
American Indian and Alaska Native	297	0.6%
Asian	488	1.0%
Native Hawaiian and Other Pacific Islander	19	0.0%
Some other race	4,872	10.3%
Two or more races	5,375	11.4%
Hispanic or Latino (of any race)	11,600	24.5%

=== 2010 census ===
As of the 2010 United States census, there were 41,590 people, 15,207 households, and 9,515 families residing in the city.

As of the census of 2010, the population density was 2,021.9 inhabitants per square mile (780.7/km^{2}). There were 17,170 housing units at an average density of 1,164.7 per square mile (449.7/km^{2}).

In 2010, there were 15,207 households, out of which 32.9% had children under the age of 18 living with them, 37.3% were married couples living together, 19.6% had a female householder with no husband present, and 37.9% were non-families. 32.5% of all households were made up of individuals, and 11.7% had someone living alone who was 65 years of age or older. The average household size was 2.73 and the average family size was 3.50.

In 2010, in the city, the population was spread out, with 25.9% under the age of 18, 7.0% from 20 to 24, 13.3% from 25 to 34, 13.0% from 45 to 54, 9.8% from 55 to 64 and 6.8% who were 65 years of age or older. The median age was 35.2 years. For every 100 females, there were 97.4 males. For every 100 females age 18 and over, there were 94.9 males.

In 2010, the median income for a household in the city was $30,869, and the median income for a family was $36,337. Males had a median income of $32,412 versus $26,349 for females. The per capita income for the city was $16,782. 30.2% of the population were below the poverty line.

== Economy ==
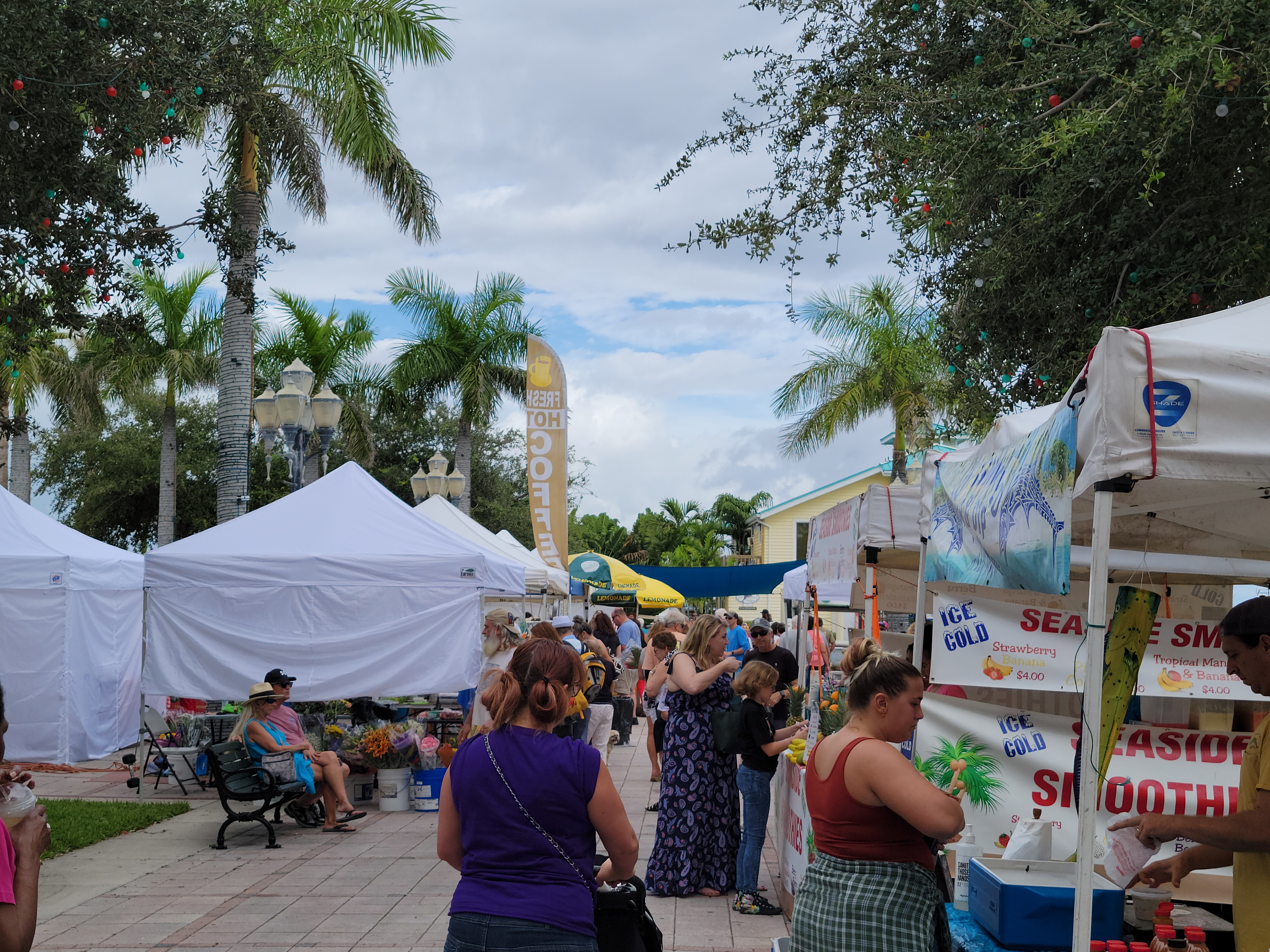
Fort Pierce Farmers Market

Largest employers
No.	Employer	Employees
1	HCA Florida Lawnwood Hospital	1,847
2	Walmart Distribution Center	1,273
3	Pursuit Boats	684
4	Maverick Boat Group	580
5	City of Fort Pierce	358

=== Port of Fort Pierce ===
According to the U.S. Army Corps of Engineers, an average of 350,000 tons of waterborne commerce moves through the Port of Fort Pierce annually. Major commodities which are dependent on the port include citrus exports, cement and aragonite imports. The last navigation improvements at Fort Pierce were authorized by the U.S. Congress in the Water Resources Development Act of 1988, and construction was completed in August 1996. The existing entrance channel is 400 ft (120 m) wide and 30 ft (9.1 m) deep, the interior channel is 250 ft (76 m) wide and 28 ft (8.5 m) deep, the existing turning basin is 1,100 ft (340 m) square and 28 ft (8.5 m) deep, and the north access channel is located immediately north of the main turning basin is 1,250 ft (380 m) feet long, 250 ft (76 m) wide and 28 ft (8.5 m) deep.

In late 2014, dredging efforts were completed in the port. The dredging effort included placement of beach quality sand on the beach immediately south of the Inlet and placement of non-beach quality sand in the approved offshore disposal area.

== Arts and culture ==
=== Tourist attractions ===
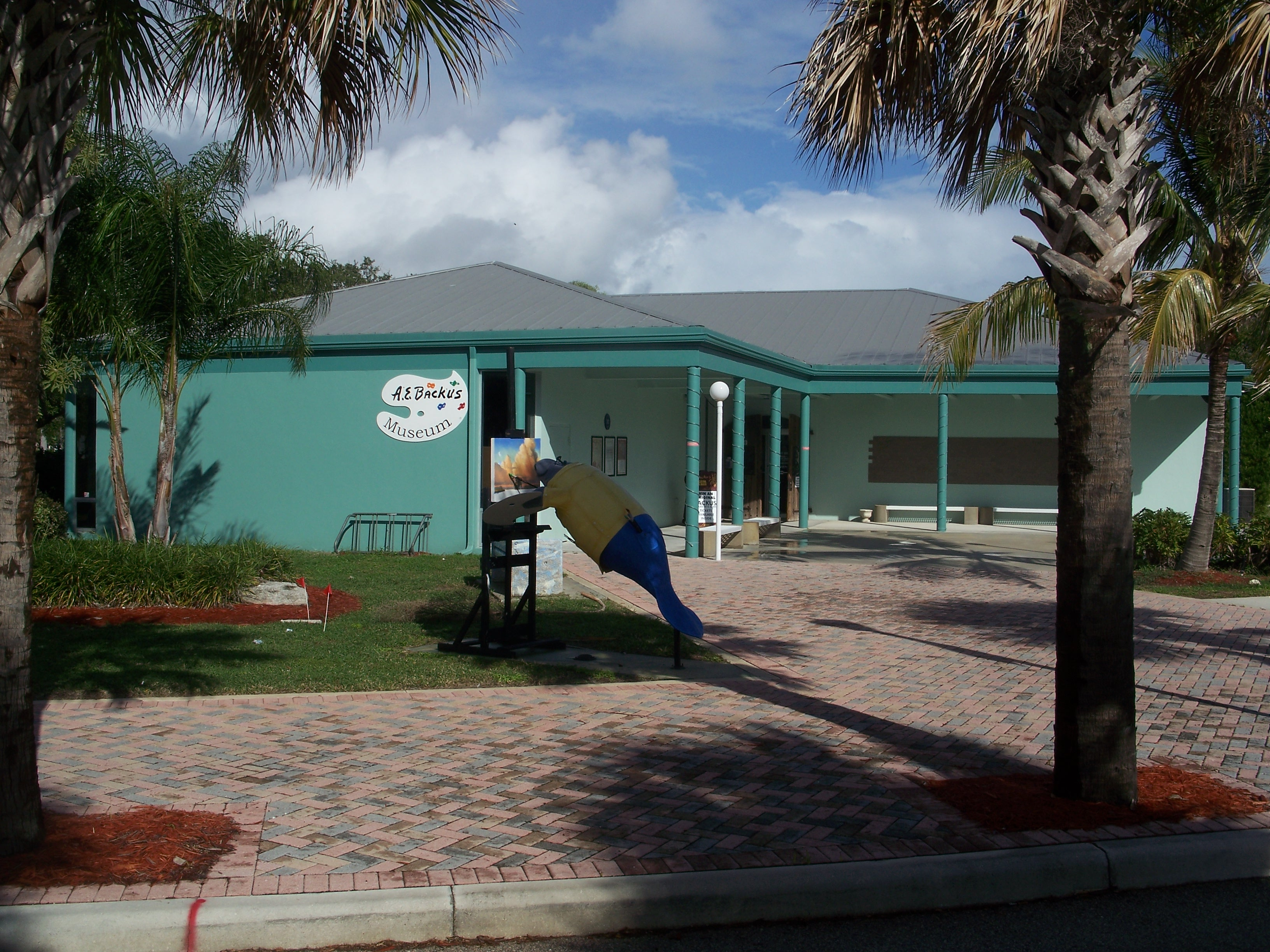
A.E. Backus Museum and Gallery

- A.E. Backus Museum and Gallery
- Arcade Building
- Art Mundo at the Art Bank
- Boston House
- Dust Tracks of Zora Neale Hurston
- Harbor Branch Oceanographic Institute
- Heathcote Botanical Gardens
- Historic Main Street
- Florida Power and Light Energy Encounter
- Lincoln Park Main Street
- Old Fort Pierce City Hall
- Old Fort Park
- Manatee Center
- Navy UDT-SEAL Museum (Fort Pierce was the original home of the United States Navy SEALs)
- Smithsonian Marine Ecosystem Exhibit
- St. Lucie County Marine Center
- St. Lucie County Regional History Center
- Sunrise Theatre

== Government ==
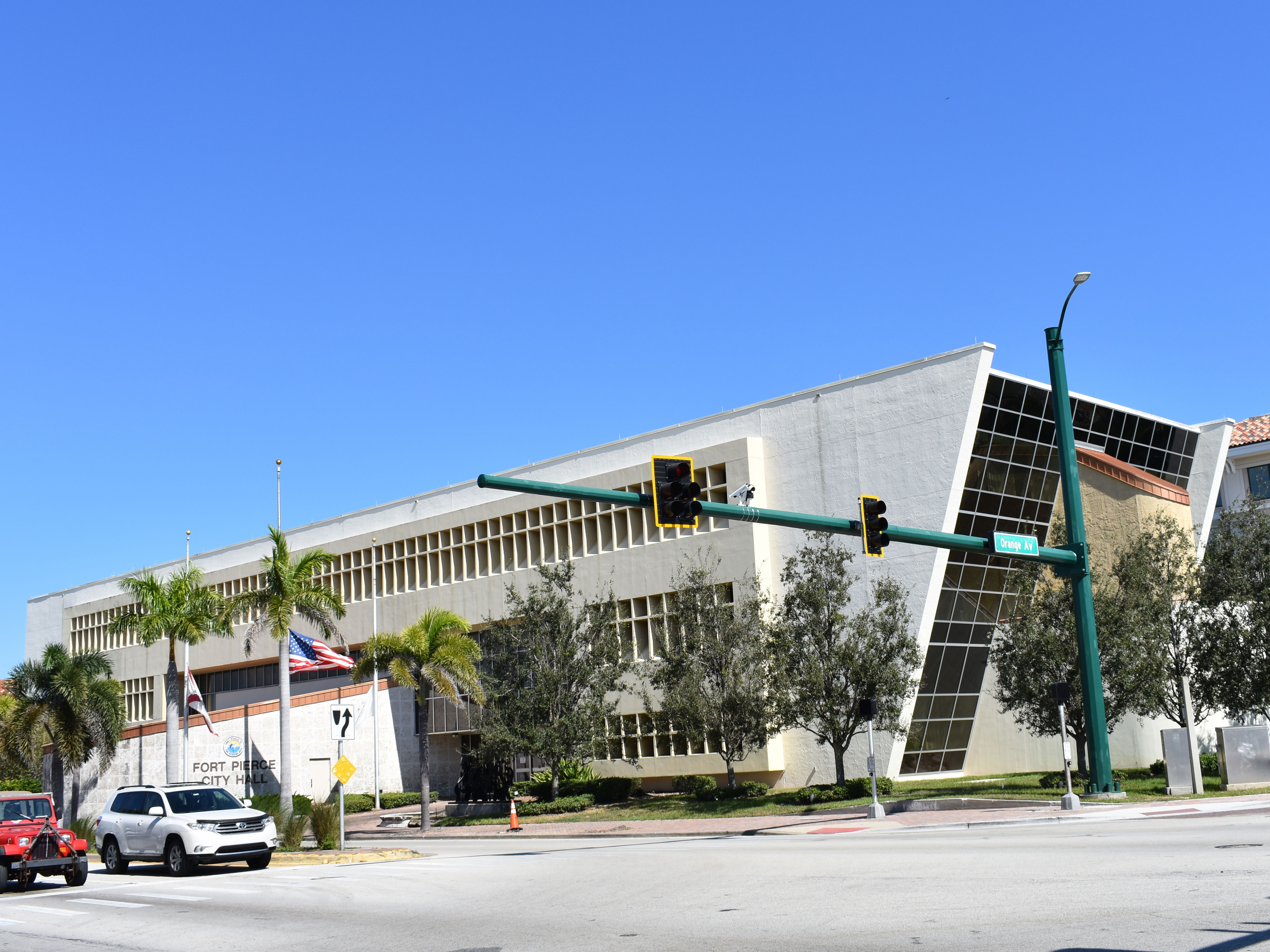
Fort Pierce City Hall

The city of Fort Pierce has a council–manager government form of local government. The offices of commissioner and mayor are nonpartisan, and have a term of four years.

== Education ==
=== Colleges and universities ===
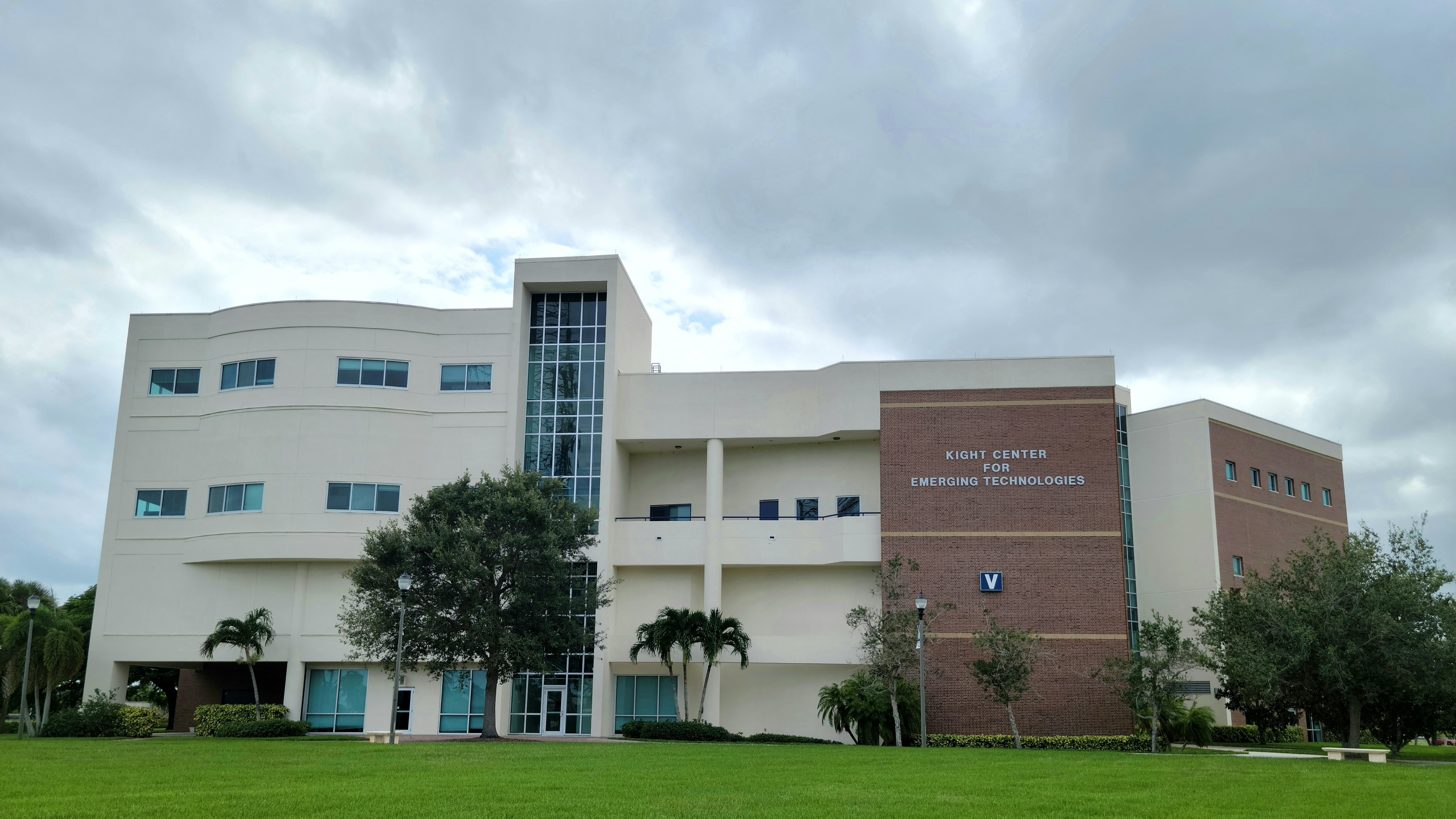
Kight Center for Emerging Technologies at the Fort Pierce campus of Indian River State College

- Florida Atlantic University Harbor Branch Oceanographic Institute
- Florida State University Medical School Regional Campus
- Indian River State College
- University of Florida Indian River Research and Education Center

=== High schools ===
- Faith Baptist School
- Fort Pierce Central High School
- Fort Pierce Westwood Academy
- John Carroll Catholic High School
- Lincoln Park Academy

=== Middle schools ===
- Creative Arts Academy of Saint Lucie
- Dan McCarty Middle School
- Forest Grove Middle School
- Lincoln Park Academy
- Saint Anastasia Middle School
- Saint Andrew's Academy
- Samuel S. Gaines Academy K–8

=== Elementary schools ===
- Chester A. Moore Elementary School
- Creative Arts Academy of Saint Lucie
- Fairlawn Elementary School
- Francis K. Sweet Elementary School
- Lakewood Park Elementary School
- Lawnwood Elementary School
- Samuel S. Gaines Academy K–8
- Weatherbee Elementary School
- White City Elementary School

== Infrastructure ==
=== Transportation ===
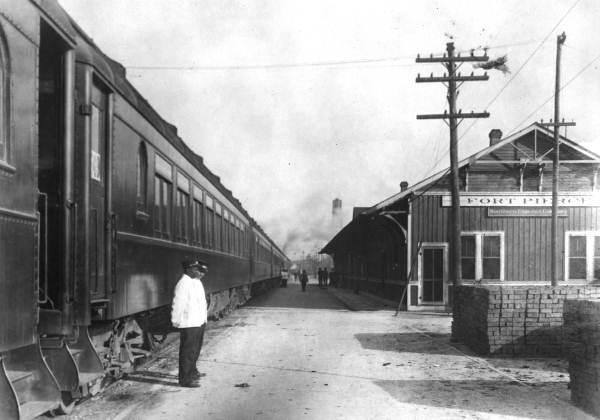
The Fort Pierce Railroad Station in the early 20th Century

Fort Pierce is located on US 1, near its intersection of SR 70. I-95 and Florida's Turnpike are nearby, at the west edge of town. The Intracoastal Waterway passes through the city. The nearest airport with scheduled passenger service is in Melbourne; the closest major airport is in West Palm Beach. The city itself has a general aviation airport, Treasure Coast International Airport.

Fort Pierce is served by the St. Lucie Transportation Planning Organization (TPO). The TPO is a Metropolitan Planning Organization (MPO), a federally mandated and federally funded transportation policy-making organization responsible for transportation planning, programming, and financing of State and Federal transportation funds for the City of Fort Pierce. The TPO is governed by a TPO Board, which is composed of elected officials, representatives from the St. Lucie County School Board, and representatives from Community Transit, a division of The Council on Aging of St. Lucie, Inc. The original bus system started as a demand response service bus in the 1990s; it only served St. Lucie County. Soon it expanded to a fixed route system, going to predetermined locations along a route. On June 3, 2002, the Florida Department of Transportation (FDOT) approved funding, expanding the bus service to Martin County, and it became the Treasure Coast Connector.

From 1894 to 1968, the Florida East Coast Railway served the city as a passenger railroad. Until a strike beginning in 1963, several long-distance passenger trains from Chicago, Cincinnati and New York City made stops there, en route to Miami. These long distances trains included the Illinois Central Railroad's City of Miami and the Louisville & Nashville Railroad's South Wind, both heading from Chicago; and the Atlantic Coast Line Railroad's East Coast Champion, the Havana Special, and the winter-only Florida Special originating from New York. Into the latter 1950s, passengers could take the Dixie Flagler to Chicago via Atlanta from the station. The FEC continued a six day a week Jacksonville-Miami train from 1965 to 1968, per court order.

Amtrak and the Florida East Coast Railway had been planning to make stations along Florida's East Coast. The cities cited by Amtrak and the Florida Department of Transportation included: Stuart, Fort Pierce, Vero Beach, Melbourne, Titusville, Cocoa, Daytona Beach and St. Augustine.

In 2023, Brightline, an inter-city rail route that currently runs between Miami and Orlando, announced that it was looking for sites for a new station on the Treasure Coast. As of 2024, there are currently no plans to add a station in Fort Pierce.

== Notable people ==
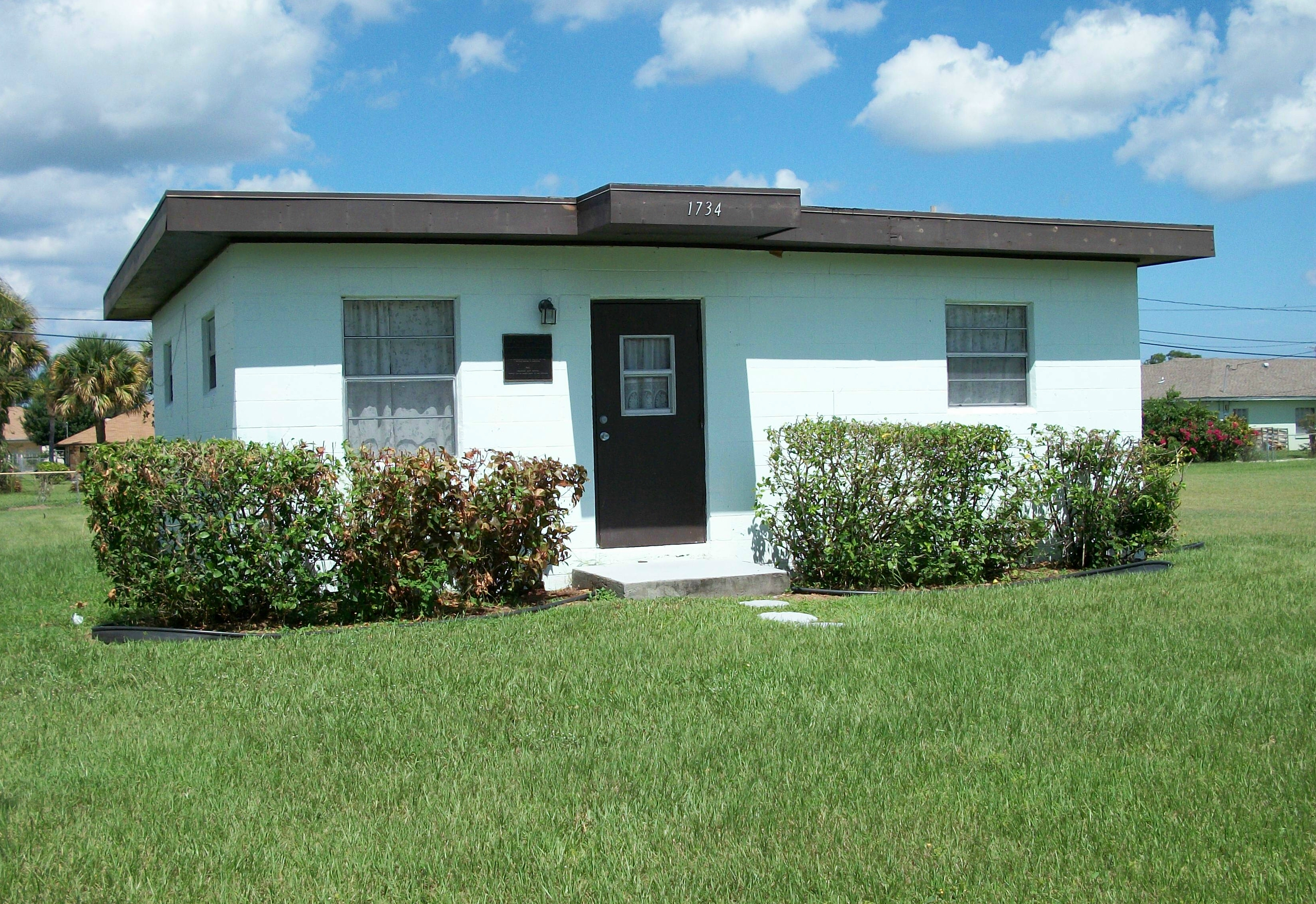
Zora Neale Hurston's house

=== Arts and entertainment ===
- Ricou Browning, stunt performer, filmmaker and actor
- Michael P. Nash, filmmaker
- Lisa Janti, actress
- A. E. Backus, painter
- Zora Neale Hurston, writer, anthropologist and folklorist
- Lori McNamara, painter
- Ted Hewitt, country music producer
- Gary Stewart, country singer

=== Politics ===
- Alto Adams, Chief Justice of the Supreme Court of Florida
- James E. Alderman, Chief Justice, Florida Supreme Court
- Dale Cassens, member of the Florida House of Representatives
- Brian Mast, U.S. Representative
- Daniel T. McCarty, 31st Governor of Florida
- Allen R. Sturtevant, Associate Justice of the Vermont Supreme Court

=== Sports ===
- Jeff Blackshear, NFL guard
- Jamar Chaney, NFL linebacker
- Yamon Figurs, NFL and CFL wide receiver
- Charles Johnson, MLB catcher
- Ladislav Karabin, Slovak ice hockey player
- Khalil Mack, NFL linebacker
- Terry McGriff, MLB catcher
- Ryan McNeil, NFL defensive back
- Wonder Monds, NFL defensive back
- Luther Robinson, NFL defensive end
- Larry Sanders, NBA player
- Jeff Schwarz, MLB pitcher
- Herbert Strong, golfer and golf course architect
- LaDaris Vann, CFL player

=== Other ===
- Kimberly Bergalis, victim of first known case of clinical transmission of HIV
- Edwin Binney, co-founder of Crayola Crayons
- Roslyn M. Brock, Chairman of the National Association for the Advancement of Colored People
- Louise Gopher, the first Seminole woman to earn a bachelor's degree
- John Houghtaling, entrepreneur and inventor
- CeeCee Lyles, Flight attendant on United Airlines Flight 93
