= Hammond House =

Hammond House may refer to:

in Canada

- Hammond House (Sackville, New Brunswick), one of Canada's National Historic Sites in New Brunswick

in the United States

(by state then city)

- Mary Alice Hammond House, Searcy, Arkansas, listed on the National Register of Historic Places (NRHP) in White County, Arkansas
- Hammond's Estate Site, Santa Barbara, California, NRHP-listed in Santa Barbara County
- Captain Hammond House, White City, Florida, NRHP-listed in St. Lucie County
- Fort-Hammond-Willis House, Milledgeville, Georgia, NRHP-listed in Baldwin County
- Edward J. Hammond Hall, Winter Harbor, Maine, NRHP-listed in Hancock County
- Hammond-Harwood House, Annapolis, Maryland, NRHP-listed
- Benson-Hammond House, Linthicum Heights, Maryland, NRHP-listed
- Hammond House (Newton, Massachusetts), NRHP-listed
- E. C. Hammond House, Newton, Massachusetts, NRHP-listed
- Ephraim Hammond House, Waltham, Massachusetts, NRHP-listed
- Jonathan Hammond House, Waltham, Massachusetts, NRHP-listed in Massachusetts
- Hammond House (Hawthorne, New York), NRHP-listed in Westchester County
- John Henry Hammond House, New York, New York, which houses the Consulate-General of Russia in New York City
- Moses Hammond House, Archdale, North Carolina, NRHP-listed in Randolph County
- Boggan-Hammond House and Alexander Little Wing, Wadesboro, North Carolina, NRHP-listed in Anson County
- Charles Hammond House, North Augusta, South Carolina, NRHP-listed in Aiken County
- Hammond House (Calvert, Texas), NRHP-listed in Robertson County

== See also ==
- Camp Hammond (Yarmouth, Maine), NRHP-listed
