= National Register of Historic Places listings in St. Lucie County, Florida =

Location of St. Lucie County in Florida

This is a list of the National Register of Historic Places listings in St. Lucie County, Florida.

This is intended to be a complete list of the properties and districts on the National Register of Historic Places in St. Lucie County, Florida, United States. The locations of National Register properties and districts for which the latitude and longitude coordinates are included below, may be seen in a map.

There are 16 properties and districts listed on the National Register in the county, including 1 National Historic Landmark.

This National Park Service list is complete through NPS recent listings posted September 26, 2025.

Contents: Counties in Florida (non-linked contain no National Register listings)
Alachua - Baker - Bay - Bradford - Brevard - Broward - Calhoun - Charlotte - Citrus - Clay - Collier - Columbia - DeSoto - Dixie - Duval - Escambia - Flagler - Franklin - Gadsden - Gilchrist - Glades - Gulf - Hamilton - Hardee - Hendry - Hernando - Highlands - Hillsborough (Tampa) - Holmes - Indian River - Jackson - Jefferson - Lafayette - Lake - Lee - Leon - Levy - Liberty - Madison - Manatee - Marion - Martin - Miami-Dade (Miami) - Monroe - Nassau - Okaloosa - Okeechobee - Orange - Osceola - Palm Beach - Pasco - Pinellas - Polk - Putnam - St. Johns - St. Lucie - Santa Rosa - Sarasota - Seminole - Sumter - Suwannee - Taylor - Union - Volusia - Wakulla - Walton - Washington

== Current listings ==
| | Name on the Register | Image | Date listed | Location | City or town | Description |
|---|---|---|---|---|---|---|
| 1 | Arcade Building | Arcade Building | October 12, 2001 (#01001085) | 101 U.S. Route 1, North; 27°26′49″N 80°19′37″W | Fort Pierce | |
| 2 | Casa Caprona | Casa Caprona | June 2, 1984 (#84000955) | 2605 St. Lucie Boulevard; 27°28′59″N 80°21′06″W | Fort Pierce | |
| 3 | Cresthaven | Cresthaven | April 11, 1985 (#85000770) | 239 South Indian River Drive (CR 707); 27°26′44″N 80°19′25″W | Fort Pierce | |
| 4 | Fort Pierce Old Post Office | Fort Pierce Old Post Office | February 11, 2002 (#01000567) | 500 Orange Avenue; 27°26′49″N 80°19′39″W | Fort Pierce | |
| 5 | Fort Pierce Site | Fort Pierce Site | January 11, 1974 (#74002181) | South Indian River Drive; 27°26′11″N 80°19′14″W | Fort Pierce | |
| 6 | Jules Frere House | Jules Frere House | April 20, 1995 (#95000467) | 2404 Sunrise Boulevard; 27°25′27″N 80°20′06″W | Fort Pierce | |
| 7 | Captain Hammond House | Captain Hammond House | February 23, 1990 (#90000310) | 5775 Citrus Avenue; 27°21′49″N 80°20′34″W | White City | |
| 8 | Zora Neale Hurston House | Zora Neale Hurston House | December 4, 1991 (#91002047) | 1734 School Court; 27°27′38″N 80°20′37″W | Fort Pierce | |
| 9 | Immokolee | Immokolee | July 29, 1994 (#93001450) | 8431 Immokolee Road; 27°28′53″N 80°24′35″W | Fort Pierce | |
| 10 | Moores Creek Bridge | Moores Creek Bridge | August 17, 2001 (#01000890) | North 2nd Street between Avenues B and C 27°27′02″N 80°19′32″W | Fort Pierce | |
| 11 | Old Fort Pierce City Hall | Old Fort Pierce City Hall | December 7, 2001 (#01001338) | 315 Avenue A 27°26′52″N 80°19′35″W | Fort Pierce | |
| 12 | Old St. Anastasia Catholic School | Old St. Anastasia Catholic School | August 10, 2000 (#00000941) | 910 Orange Avenue; 27°26′49″N 80°19′59″W | Fort Pierce | |
| 13 | St. Lucie High School | St. Lucie High School | January 26, 1984 (#84000956) | 1100 Delaware Avenue; 27°26′36″N 80°20′01″W | Fort Pierce | |
| 14 | St. Lucie Village Historic District | St. Lucie Village Historic District | December 1, 1989 (#89002062) | 2505-3305 North Indian River Drive; 27°29′17″N 80°20′10″W | St. Lucie Village | |
| 15 | Sunrise Theatre | Sunrise Theatre | December 7, 2001 (#01001339) | 117 South 2nd Street; 27°26′46″N 80°19′26″W | Fort Pierce | |
| 16 | Urca de Lima | | May 31, 2001 (#01000529) | 200 yards offshore of Jack Island Park, north of Ft. Pierce Inlet; 27°30′11″N 80°17′54″W | Fort Pierce | |

== See also ==
- List of National Historic Landmarks in Florida
- National Register of Historic Places listings in Florida
