= Capron (disambiguation) =

Capron is a surname. It may also refer to:

== Places in the United States ==
- Capron, Illinois, a village
- Capron, Oklahoma, a town
- Capron, Virginia, a town

== Other uses ==
- The BASF trade name for Nylon 6, a polymer
- Capron GmbH, a German manufacturer of motorhomes

== See also ==
- Capron House (disambiguation)
