= Capron =

Capron is a French and English surname. Notable people with the surname include:

- Capron (Sussex cricketer) (18th century), English cricketer
- Allyn Capron (1846–1898), American army captain
- Allyn K. Capron (1871–1898), American army captain
- Brian Capron (born 1947), English actor
- Frederick Capron (1860–1942), English cricketer
- Hiram Capron (1796–1872), American-born founder of Paris, Ontario
- Jean Pierre Capron (1921–1997), French landscape and portrait artist
- John Capron (1797–1878), American army officer and politician
- John Rand Capron (1829–1888), English astronomer
- Ralph Capron (1889–1980), American baseball player
- Robert Capron (born 1998), American actor
- Roger Capron (1922–2006), French ceramic artist
- Sarah B. Capron (1824–1918), American evangelical missionary
- Victor Capron (1868–1934), American politician

== See also ==
- Caprone, a synonym of Mantonico bianco, a white Italian wine grape variety
