= Jonathan Hammond =

Jonathan Hammond may refer to:

- Jonathan Hammond (filmmaker), American filmmaker
- Jonathan Hammond (footballer) (1891–1980), English footballer
- Jonathan Hammond (sport shooter) (born 1980), British sport shooter
- The namesake of the Jonathan Hammond House
