= Wilbur Bacon Camp =

American architect

- Wilbur Bacon Camp, ca. early 1900s
- Born: July 29, 1860; Herrick Township, Bradford County, Pennsylvania
- Died: March 24, 1918 (aged 57); Charleston, West Virginia
- Occupation: Architect
- Buildings: St. Lucie High School, Old Duval High School, Fire Station #2, Thurston Roberts Residence, R.H. McMillan Residence, Jones Brothers Furniture Company Building

Wilbur Bacon Camp (1860–1918) was one of a number of out-of-town architects and builders attracted to Jacksonville, FL by the construction opportunities created by the disastrous Great Fire of 1901.

== Early life ==
Wilbur B. Camp was born July 29, 1860, in Herrick Township, Bradford County, Pennsylvania, where he spent most of his early years. The sources of his architectural training have not been determined, but he had established a practice by 1890 advertising in an Athens, Pennsylvania, newspaper as an architect, contractor and builder. However, by 1898, Wilbur Camp reportedly moved to Geneva, New York, where he remained until relocating to Jacksonville in October or November 1901.

== Career ==
Camp appeared to have a successful practice in Athens with many of his residential designs being featured in the American Homes magazine where he also advertised his business. In some of his ads, Wilbur Camp promoted his plan book available for purchase, which had twenty different plans for houses costing $600 to $10,000. One of his noted designs before coming to Jacksonville was the First Methodist Episcopal Church in Towanda, Pennsylvania, constructed in 1895.

Continuing his business practice of selling stock plans, one of his contemporaries in Jacksonville criticized Camp for “coming to town like a patent medicine man, with a suitcase full of plans for sale”. This description was also reflected in a short ad placed by Camp in the 1902 city directory in which he stated, “I have over 600 sets of plans on file of nearly all classes of buildings that I shall be pleased to show anyone that is contemplating to build.” Camp went on to state that he had spent the last five months working with Jacksonville architect Henry John Klutho, in the design of the City Hall, the Dyal-Upchurch Building, the T.V. Porter residence, and the Congregational Church.

Initially opening an office with John K. Bliven in 1902, Camp went on to design several landmark structures during his two decades in Jacksonville. Camp is also recognized as one of the first architects in Jacksonville outside of Henry John Klutho that was utilizing the avant-garde Prairie School style architecture for residential design. Two noted Prairie Style residential designs by Camp include the Thurston Roberts Residence at 1804 Elizabeth Place (c. 1913), and the R.H. McMillan residence at 2317 Oak Street (1913). The source of his Prairie Style influence is not known, but may have resulted from national publications featuring the style or was exposed to it while working with Klutho.

In addition to the Old Duval High School (1907–1908), other more revival style buildings designed by Camp include the 1905 -06 addition to the Florida National Bank Building, Fire Station # 2 (1909), and the Springfield Methodist Church. He also designed the Jones Brothers Furniture Store (1913, demolished) which was a six-story reinforced concrete building reflecting the Chicago Style of high rise architecture. Residing in Springfield, Camp designed his own residence at 1824 North Pearl Street. During his time in Jacksonville from the fall of 1901 to his death in 1918, Camp designed a variety of houses, apartments, stores, warehouses, and schools in different parts of Florida and Georgia, as well as in other states. Some of these designs include the Bradford County Courthouse in Tawonda, Pennsylvania, St. Lucie High School in Fort Pierce, Florida, Methodist Episcopal Churches in Millen and Bainbridge, Georgia, and schools in St. Mary's, Thomasville, and Waycross, Georgia.

Although maintaining his residence and practice in Jacksonville, Wilbur B. Camp opened an office in Charlestown, West Virginia, during the early part of 1918. At the time he was designing the five-story St. Albans Hotel and First National Bank in Charleston. While in West Virginia, Wilbur B. Camp died at the age of 57 on March 24, 1918, and was interred in Woodlawn Cemetery (Evergreen Cemetery) in Jacksonville.

== Buildings ==
- First Methodist Episcopal Church of Towanda, Pennsylvania
- Old Duval High School at 605 North Ocean Street
- St. Lucie High School at 1100 Delaware Avenue, Fort Pierce, Florida
- Fire Station #2 at 1344 North Main Street
- Thurston Roberts Residence at 1804 Elizabeth Place
- R.H. McMillan Residence at 2317 Oak Street
- Jones Brothers Furniture Company Building (Demolished 1960s)
