= Archdale, North Carolina =

- City
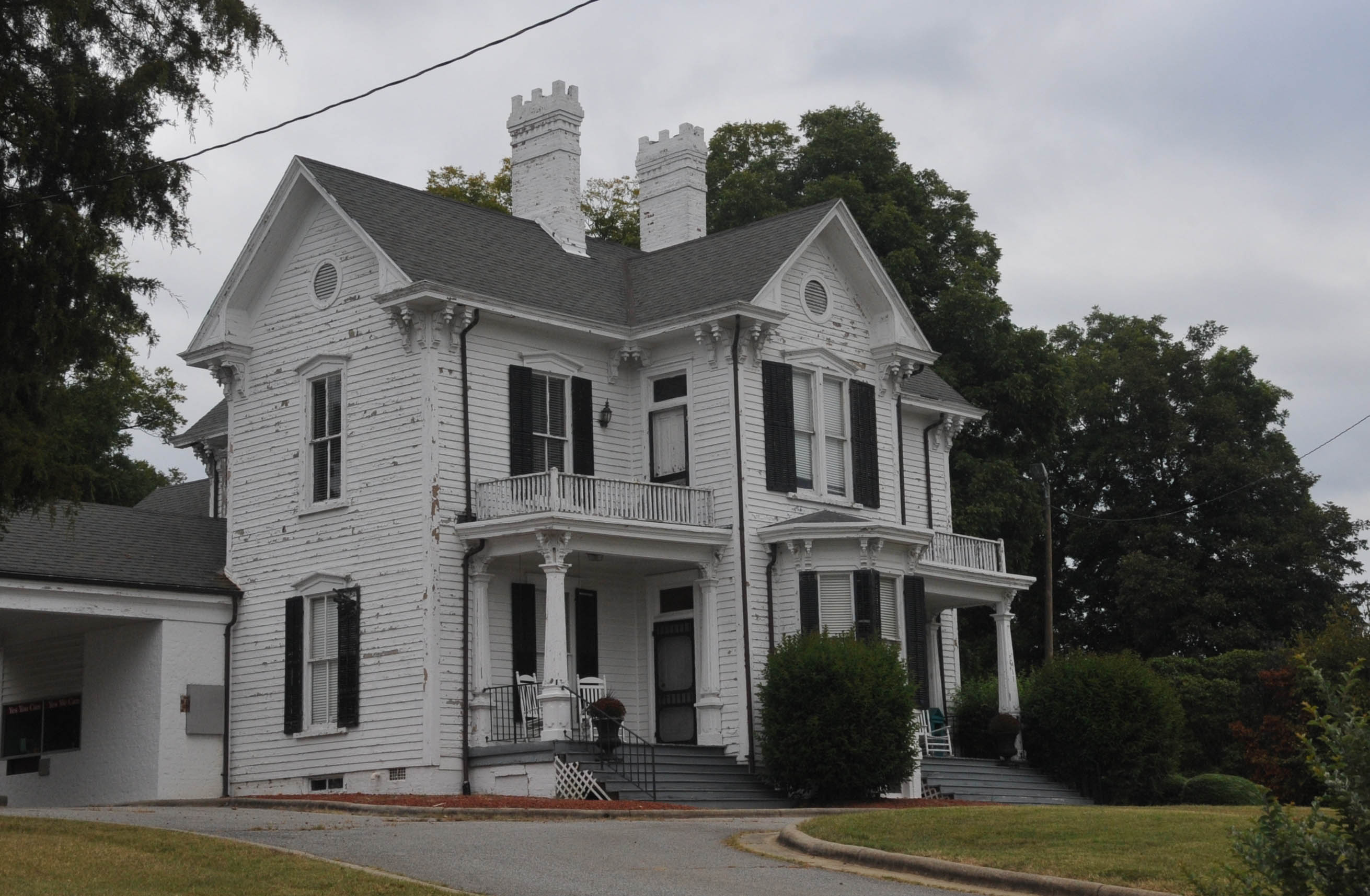

- Flag Seal Logo
- Motto: "Crossroad of progress"
- Location in Guilford County and the state of North Carolina
- Coordinates: 35°54′12″N 79°57′32″W
- Country: United States
- State: North Carolina
- Counties: Randolph, Guilford
- Founded: 1786
- Incorporated: 1874, 1969
- Named for: John Archdale

Government
  - Mayor: Lewis Dorsett

Area
  - Total: 8.86 sq mi (22.95 km^{2})
  - Land: 8.84 sq mi (22.89 km^{2})
  - Water: 0.023 sq mi (0.06 km^{2})
- Elevation: 804 ft (245 m)

Population (2020)
  - Total: 11,907
  - Density: 1,347.2/sq mi (520.15/km^{2})
- Time zone: UTC-5 (Eastern (EST))
  - Summer (DST): UTC-4 (EDT)
- ZIP code: 27263
- Area code: 336
- FIPS code: 37-01720
- GNIS feature ID: 2403108
- Website: www.archdale-nc.gov

Archdale is a city in Guilford and Randolph counties in the U.S. state of North Carolina. Located 15 miles southwest of Greensboro, it is part of the Greensboro-High Point Metropolitan Statistical Area of the Piedmont Triad metro region. The population of the city was 11,907 at the 2020 census.

== Geography ==
Archdale is located primarily in Randolph County and extends north into Guilford County. It is bordered to the southwest by the city of Trinity and to the north by the city of High Point.

Interstate 85 passes through Archdale, with access from Exits 111 and 113. I-85 leads northeast 16 miles (26 km) to Greensboro and southwest 77 miles (124 km) to Charlotte. Interstate 74 passes just east of Archdale, leading northwest 26 miles (42 km) to Winston-Salem and southeast 21 miles (34 km) to Asheboro.

According to the United States Census Bureau, Archdale has a total area of 8.2 square miles (21.3 km^{2}), of which 0.02 square miles (0.06 km^{2}), or 0.27%, is water. The city is within the watershed of the Deep River, a tributary of the Cape Fear River. Muddy Creek, a tributary of the Deep River rises within the city limits of Archdale.

== Demographics ==
Historical population
Census	Pop.	Note	%±
1890	224		—
1900	182		−18.7%
1910	145		−20.3%
1920	178		22.8%
1930	628		252.8%
1940	1,097		74.7%
1950	1,218		11.0%
1960	1,520		24.8%
1970	4,874		220.7%
1980	5,326		9.3%
1990	6,913		29.8%
2000	9,014		30.4%
2010	11,415		26.6%
2020	11,907		4.3%
2025 (est.)	12,254	▲	2.9%
U.S. Decennial Census

=== 2020 census ===
As of the 2020 census, Archdale had a population of 11,907. The median age was 43.8 years. 20.8% of residents were under the age of 18 and 19.6% of residents were 65 years of age or older. For every 100 females there were 90.1 males, and for every 100 females age 18 and over there were 85.7 males age 18 and over.

Archdale racial composition
Race	Number	Percentage
White (non-Hispanic)	8,831	74.17%
Black or African American (non-Hispanic)	744	6.25%
Native American	55	0.46%
Asian	1,061	8.91%
Pacific Islander	2	0.02%
Other/Mixed	427	3.59%
Hispanic or Latino	787	6.61%

98.2% of residents lived in urban areas, while 1.8% lived in rural areas.

There were 4,905 households in Archdale, including 2,977 families. Of all households, 29.2% had children under the age of 18 living in them, 47.6% were married-couple households, 16.6% were households with a male householder and no spouse or partner present, and 30.4% were households with a female householder and no spouse or partner present. About 29.6% of all households were made up of individuals and 13.0% had someone living alone who was 65 years of age or older.

There were 5,138 housing units, of which 4.5% were vacant. The homeowner vacancy rate was 0.9% and the rental vacancy rate was 6.6%.

=== 2010 census ===
As of the census of 2010, there were 11,415 people, 4,556 households, and 3,137 families residing in the city. The population density was 1,151.8 inhabitants per square mile (444.7/km^{2}). There were 4,916 housing units at an average density of 509.3 per square mile (196.6/km^{2}). The racial makeup of the city was 87.8% White, 4% African American, 0.6% Native American, 4% Asian, 1.4% from other races, and 1.4% from two or more races. Hispanic or Latino of any race were 4% of the population.

There were 4,556 households, out of which 30.7% had children under the age of 18 living with them, 52.3% were married couples living together, 12.3% had a female householder with no husband present, and 31.1% were non-families. 26.6% of all households were made up of individuals, and 9.8% had someone living alone who was 65 years of age or older. The average household size was 2.46 and the average family size was 2.97.

In the city, the population was spread out, with 23.8% under the age of 18, 7.2% from 18 to 24, 26.6% from 25 to 44, 26.8% from 45 to 64, and 15.6% who were 65 years of age or older. The median age was 40 years. For every 100 females, there were 90.7 males. For every 100 females age 18 and over, there were 86 males.

The median income for a household in the city was $48,291, and the median income for a family was $55,872. Males had a median income of $34,449 versus $24,456 for females. The per capita income for the city was $22,830. About 6.7% of families and 9.7% of the population were below the poverty line, including 13.9% of those under age 18 and 7.8% of those age 65 or over.

== History ==
Archdale, previously known as Bush Hill, began as a predominantly Quaker settlement and received the name "Archdale" as a tribute to John Archdale, a lord proprietor and an early Quaker governor. It was incorporated as a city in July 1969. Water and sewer service were needed because the area was "heavy clay". Voters in the area held a referendum, though residents of Trinity decided not to join Archdale.

The Moses Hammond House and Harper House are listed on the National Register of Historic Places.

Jerry W. Tillman (1940–2023), North Carolina legislator, was born in Archdale.

== Education ==
The portion in Guilford County (the majority) is in the Guilford County Schools school district.

The portion in Randolph County is in the Randolph County School System school district.

== Attractions ==
- Creekside Park, Archdale Parks and Recreation
- Kersey Valley Spookywoods
- The Bush Hill Festival
