= Harper House (Archdale, North Carolina) =

Historic house in North Carolina, United States

- U.S. National Register of Historic Places
- Location within North Carolina Location within the United States
- Location: SW of Archdale, near Archdale, North Carolina
- Coordinates: 35°51′36″N 80°0′56″W
- Area: 3.2 acres (1.3 ha)
- Built: c. 1815
- Architectural style: Federal
- NRHP reference No.: 79003347
- Added to NRHP: July 22, 1979

Harper House, also known as the Ragan House, is a historic farmhouse located in Trinity Township, near Archdale, Randolph County, North Carolina. It was built about 1815, and is a two-story, three bay by two bay, Federal period frame dwelling, with a lower two-story, three bay by two bay wing. It has a hipped roof, rests on a brick foundation, and has flanking exterior end chimneys.

It was added to the National Register of Historic Places in 1979.
