= Kersey Valley Spookywoods =

Seasonal haunted attraction in North Carolina

- Official Logo

- A scare actor holds a lantern, posing for the 40th anniversary of Spookywoods

- Location in North Carolina
- Location: Archdale, North Carolina, United States
- Coordinates: 35°55′49.471″N 79°56′7.401″W
- Status: Operating
- Opened: 1985
- Owner: Kersey Valley, Inc.
- Operated by: Tony and Donna Wohlgemuth
- Slogan: "Killin' It Since 1985"
- Operating season: Late September to early November
- Attendance: 40,000+
- Area: 92 acres (37 ha)
- Website: www.spookywoods.com

Tony and Donna Wohlgemuth

Kersey Valley Spookywoods (commonly known as Spookywoods or Spooky Woods) is a seasonal haunted attraction located in Archdale, North Carolina. It is one of the oldest and largest haunted attractions in the Southeastern United States.

== History ==
Spookywoods was founded in 1985 as a small Halloween attraction on a family farm in southeastern Guilford County, near the Randolph County line. It was created by Tony Wohlgemuth and a group of friends after they reportedly explored an abandoned 1920s farmhouse on the property and were startled by bats inside. Inspired by the experience, the group staged a one-night haunted house using homemade props and costumes. The attraction, initially intended as a single event, grew quickly in popularity as word spread throughout the Piedmont Triad. By the late 1980s, it was drawing thousands of visitors annually and became one of the earliest large-scale haunted attractions in the state of North Carolina.

The tobacco farm on which Spookywoods operates was purchased by the Wohlgemuth family in 1979 after immigrating to the United States from Zurich, Switzerland, in 1968 to pursue the American Dream. After farming efforts struggled, the land was eventually left in Tony's care in the early 1980s after his father returned to Switzerland. Originally, the attraction was called "The House of Death," with each subsequent year adding a Roman numeral. After "The House of Death IV," Tony drew inspiration from the pine trees on the property—originally planted to be sold as Christmas trees but left to grow wild—which helped create the wooded setting that ultimately gave rise to the attraction's permanent name. In the early 1990s, Tony's wife, Donna, joined the team and began contributing her skills to the business's marketing and growth.

During the 1990s and 2000s, Spookywoods expanded with more elaborate set designs, professional special effects, and theatrical-style costuming. Its growing reputation earned regional and national coverage, including features on the Travel Channel and recognition in listings of top haunted attractions in the United States. Today, approximately 180 seasonal scare actors are employed each year, with a permanent staff maintaining and developing sets during the off-season.

The attraction's success led to the establishment of Kersey Valley, Inc., the company that now manages the broader property. By the 2010s, the business had expanded into a multi-attraction destination offering year-round activities such as a zip line, laser tag, escape rooms, axe throwing, and seasonal family events. Despite this diversification, Spookywoods has remained the flagship attraction and continues to draw tens of thousands of visitors each Halloween season.

== Attractions ==
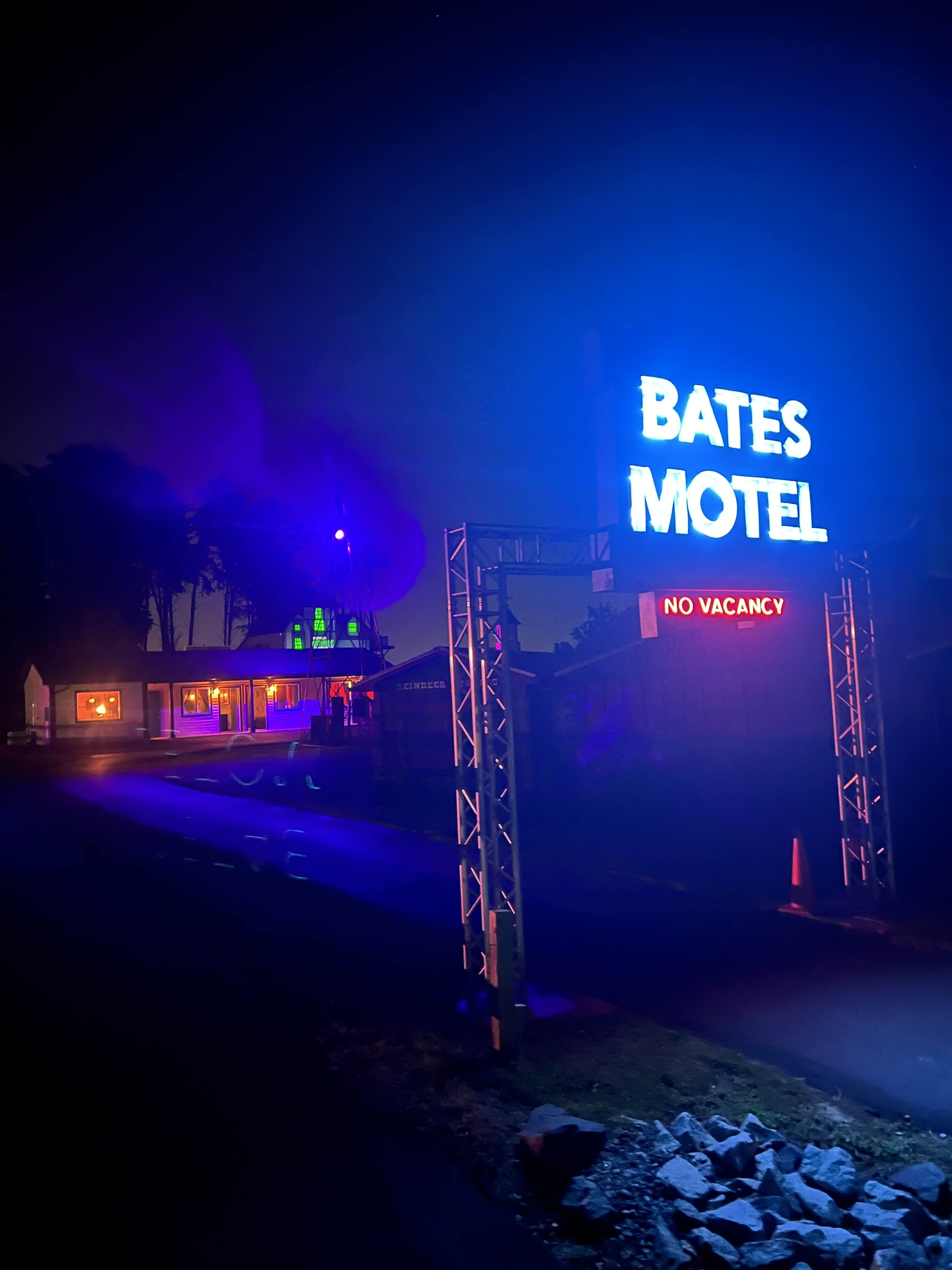
Walkway to the Bates Motel set

Spookywoods incorporates a range of horror-themed scenes. The attraction begins with a midway, which features a live DJ, lighting effects, food and beverage vendors, and scare actors who interact with guests.

Among its most notable sets are No Vacancy and Norman's Nightmare, both of which are walk-through scenes influenced by the Psycho film franchise and the popular television series Bates Motel. Other sections include Icons, which presents characters and settings inspired by classic horror films such as A Nightmare on Elm Street, Friday the 13th, Scream, and The Texas Chainsaw Massacre, and Strike!, a scene in which scare actors slide across paved surfaces using metal pads to create sparks.

Guests are transported across the property by tractor-drawn hayrides.

== Reception and media coverage ==
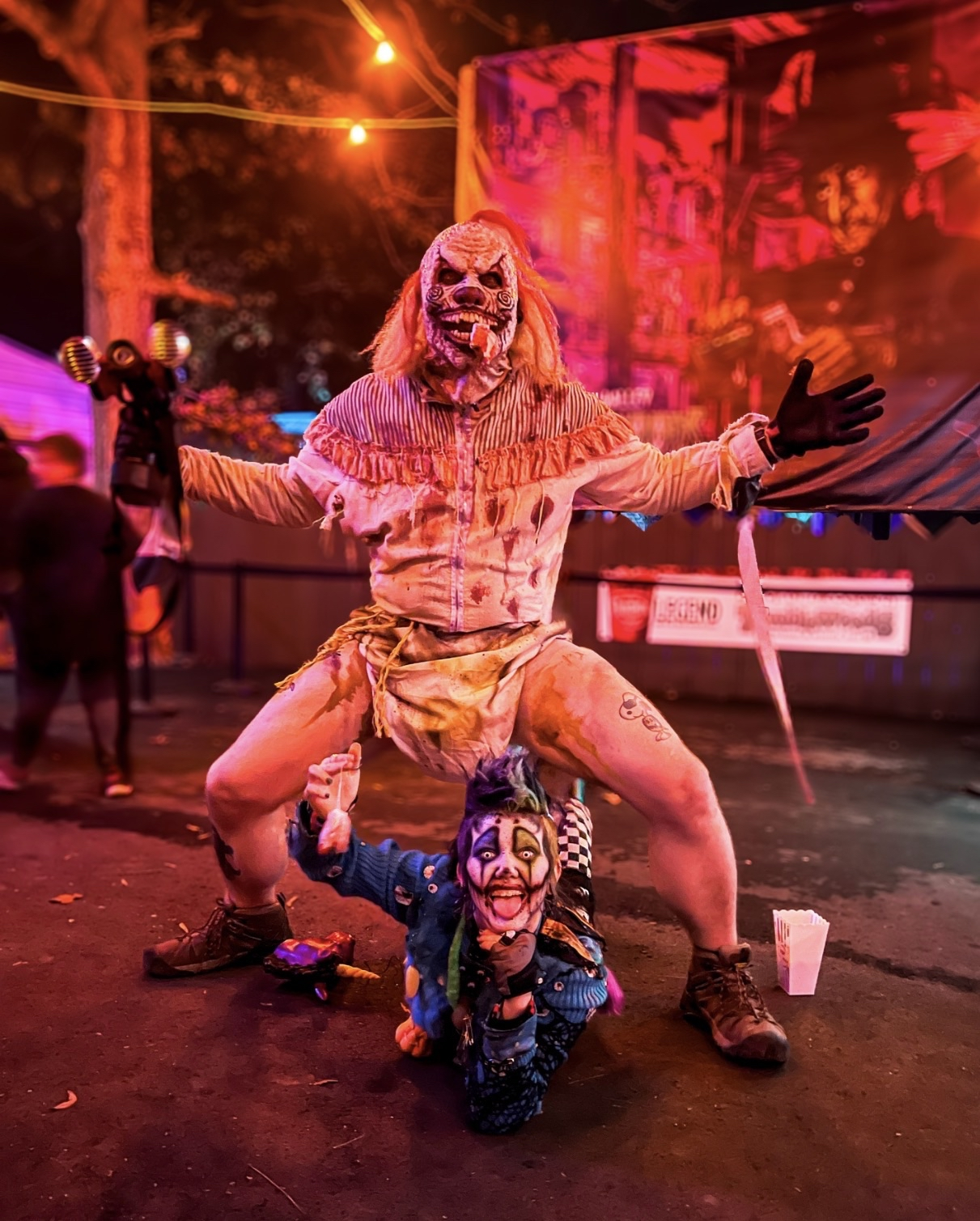
Two scare actors during the 2023 season

Since the 1990s, Spookywoods has received attention from regional and national media. It has been featured in television specials on the Travel Channel showcasing Halloween attractions in the United States, and has been included in industry rankings of top haunted attractions published by outlets such as USA Today and HauntWorld Magazine.

Local and regional media have chronicled the growth of Spookywoods from a modest farm-based event into one of North Carolina's most prominent seasonal attractions. The Greensboro News & Record noted in 2017 that "over 4,500 thrill seekers now visit the attraction each night" during the Halloween season. In 2021, USA Today placed Spookywoods 8th in its ranking of the best haunted attractions in the United States. More recently, Spectacular Magazine described Spookywoods as "one of America's most prominent haunted destinations." Additionally, ABC News 11 covered Spookywoods in 2025, noting that "each scene is designed with meticulous detail to deliver a blockbuster-worthy experience."

Our State, a monthly North Carolinian magazine, described Spookywoods as an "adventure park in the Triad... to die for. By night, the undead come alive for Halloween tricks."

Spookywoods has been featured in walkthrough videos and interviews by various media personalities and online content creators on sites like YouTube, Instagram, TikTok, and Facebook, showcasing both the attraction's sets and its performers.

High Point University covered Spookywoods on their student broadcast All Access on October 22, 2025.

In 2025, Tony and Donna were honored with the "Crypt Keeper" award by Fear Carolina, in recognition of their decades-long leadership, innovation, and hard work in the haunt attraction industry in the Carolinas.

Spookywoods, by itself, brings in more than 40,000 guests annually.

== Kersey Valley ==
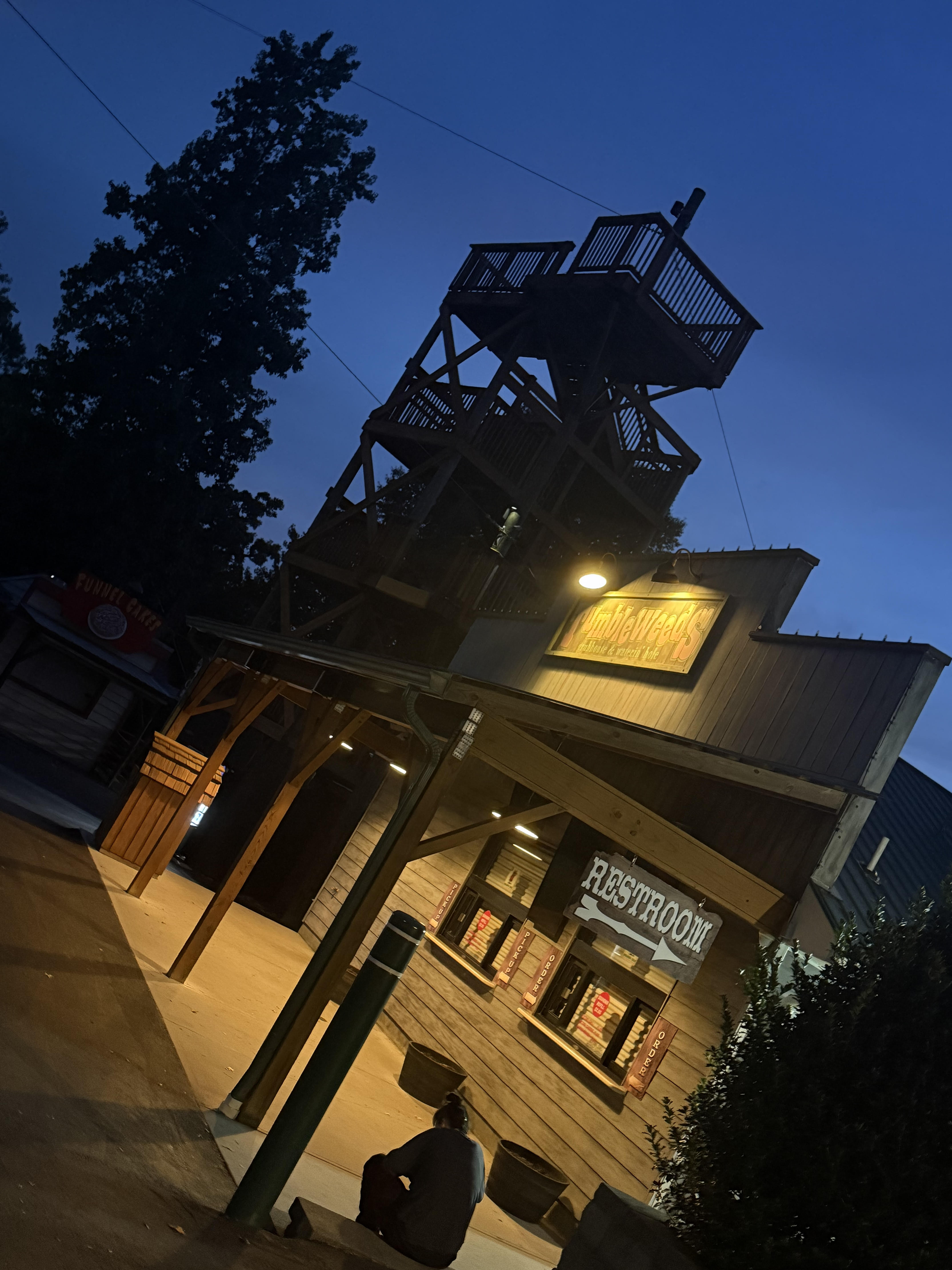
One of the zip line towers at Kersey Valley, with a food and beverage vendor shop in the foreground

Beyond Spookywoods, Kersey Valley has expanded into a multi-attraction destination operating year-round on its 92-acre (37 ha) property. Among its most prominent offerings is an aviation-themed zip lining adventure. The site also hosts an outdoor tactical laser tag facility, along with several escape rooms.

Additional attractions include both indoor and outdoor axe throwing ranges, as well as "bomb bowling," a hybrid group activity that combines aspects of football, bowling, horseshoes, and cornhole. Each December, the property transforms into Kersey Valley Christmas, showcasing large-scale holiday light displays and festive wagon rides. During the fall months, Maize Adventure offers family-oriented activities such as a corn maze, pumpkin patch, train rides, and other agritourism experiences. Altogether, attractions at Kersey Valley bring in more than 100,000 people annually.

In 2025, Kersey Valley was designated as a bona fide farm under North Carolina law and subsequently rezoned, allowing them to operate within agricultural zoning classifications while maintaining their status as an entertainment venue.

== Location ==
The business office for Spookywoods is located at 1615 Kersey Valley Road, Archdale, North Carolina, with additional land used for parking and various other purposes located at neighboring Cecil Farm Road. The attraction is accessible from Interstate 85, drawing visitors from Greensboro, High Point, Winston-Salem, with many also traveling from the Charlotte and Raleigh–Durham areas. While the majority of visitors come from the surrounding Piedmont Triad and nearby North Carolina metro areas, the attraction also draws occasional visitors from other states and abroad, according to online reviews and local tourism promotions.
