= Capron House =

Capron House may refer to:

in the United States

(by state then town)

- Capron-Phillips House, Coventry, Connecticut, listed on the National Register of Historic Places (NRHP)
- Casa Caprona, Ft. Pierce, Florida, NRHP-listed
- Capron House (Attleboro, Massachusetts), NRHP-listed
- George Capron House, Taunton, Massachusetts, NRHP-listed
- Charles Capron House, Uxbridge, Massachusetts, NRHP-listed
