= St. Lucie High School =

- U.S. National Register of Historic Places
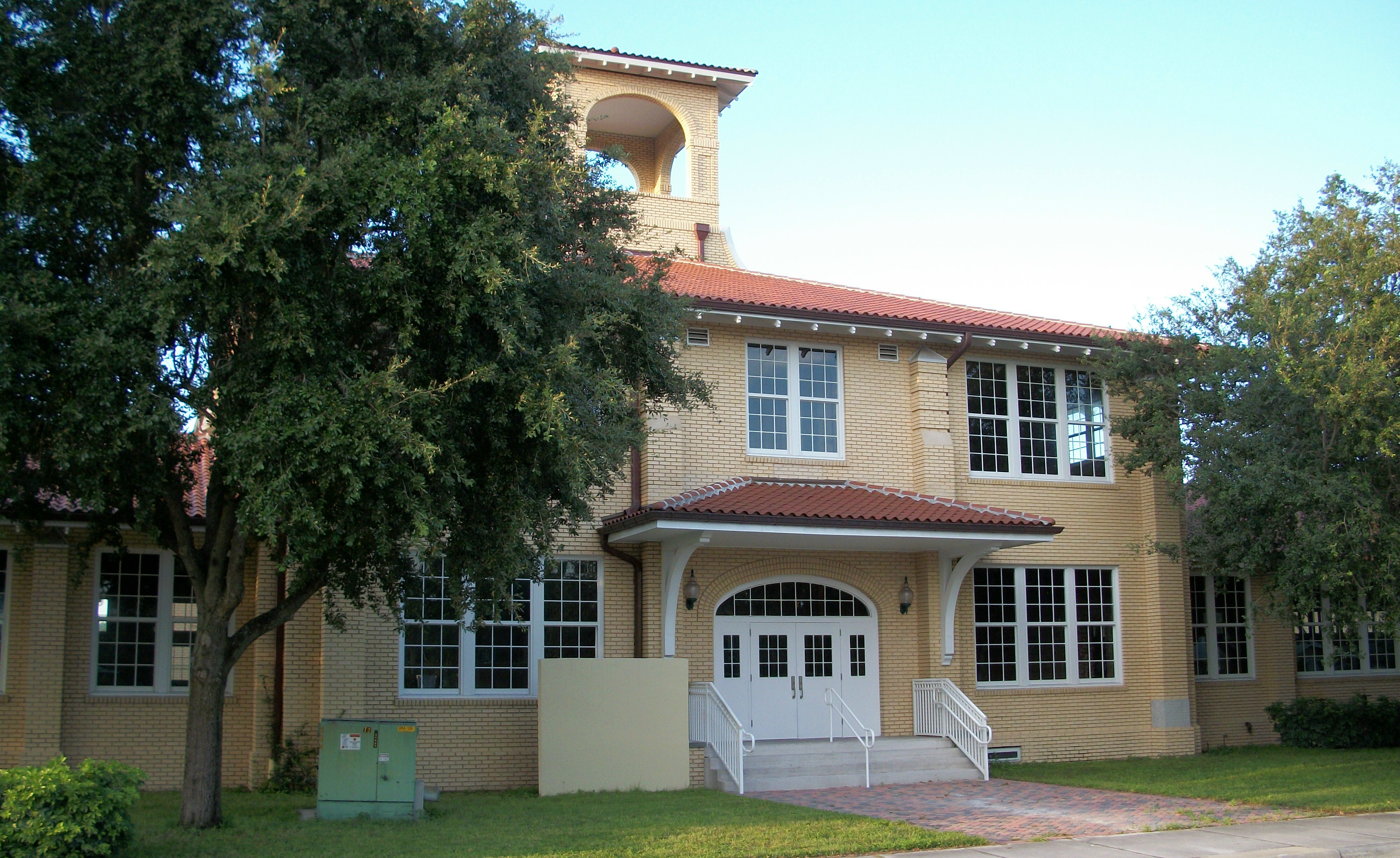

- Location within Florida Location within the United States
- Location: 1100 Delaware Avenue; Fort Pierce, Florida 34950
- Coordinates: 27°26′36″N 80°20′1″W
- Built: 1914, 1926
- Architect: W.B. Camp, William Hatcher, and Laurence Funke
- Architectural style: Mission Revival, Spanish Colonial Revival
- NRHP reference No.: 84000956
- Added to NRHP: January 26, 1984

The St. Lucie High School (also known as the Fort Pierce Elementary School) is a historic school in Fort Pierce, Florida. It is located at 1100 Delaware Avenue. On January 26, 1984, it was added to the U.S. National Register of Historic Places.

The building was first called Fort Pierce High School. For many years it was the only high school between Stuart and Melbourne. Originally designed by W.B. Camp, at one point it was "the most magnificent, the most modernly planned and the most architecturally beautiful public school building in Florida." As the school grew, architects such as William Hatcher and Laurence Funke made additions in 1926 closely following the original construction.

The building now houses the Creative Arts Academy of St. Lucie, which offers an interdisciplinary curriculum that features music, art, dance and drama for elementary and middle school students.

== Notable alumni ==
- Verne D. Mudge - Class of 1916, a major general in the United States Army during World War II
