= Ephraim Hammond House =

Historic house in Massachusetts, United States

- U.S. National Register of Historic Places
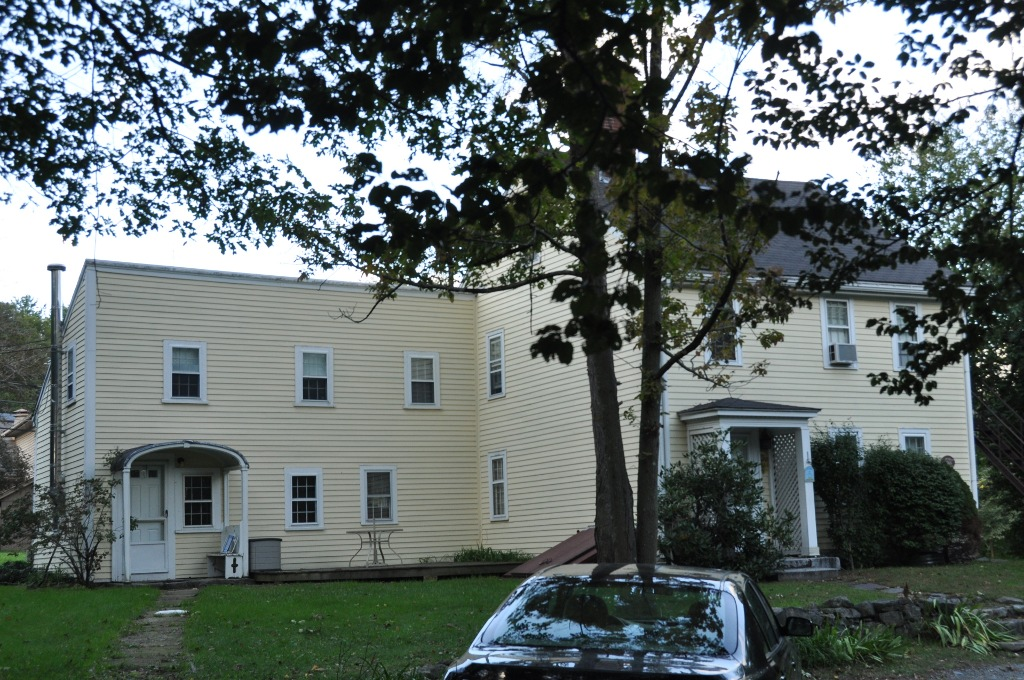

- Location within Massachusetts Location within the United States
- Location: 265 Beaver St., Waltham, Massachusetts
- Coordinates: 42°23′10″N 71°12′51″W
- Built: 1775
- Architectural style: Georgian
- MPS: Waltham MRA
- NRHP reference No.: 89001490
- Added to NRHP: September 28, 1989

The Ephraim Hammond House, also known as Cedar Hill, is a historic house at 265 Beaver Street in Waltham, Massachusetts.

The two-story wood-frame house was built in 1775 and is Waltham's only side-hall Georgian house. It was added to the National Register of Historic Places in 1989. In the 19th century it became part of the Cedar Hill estate of Cornelia Lyman Warren, after which it was donated to the Massachusetts council of the Girl Scouts of the USA in the early 20th century. The house was restored under the auspices of the Girl Scouts and Helen Storrow, an early leader of the girls' scouting movement, and serves as one of the council's service centers.

== See also ==
- Jonathan Hammond House
- National Register of Historic Places listings in Waltham, Massachusetts
