= Frederick Capron =

English cricketer (1860–1942)

Personal information
- Full name: Frederick William Capron
- Born: 1 October 1860; Westminster, London, England
- Died: 18 January 1942 (aged 81); Kensington, London, England
- Batting: Right-handed

Domestic team information
- Years: Team
- 1881–1882: Marylebone Cricket Club

Career statistics
Competition	First-class
Matches	2
Runs scored	13
Batting average	4.33
100s/50s	–/–
Top score	11
Catches/stumpings	–/–
- Source: Cricinfo, 1 September 2021

Frederick William Capron (1 October 1860 – 18 January 1942) was an English first-class cricketer and solicitor.

The son of Frederick Lucas Capron, he was born at Westminster in October 1860. He was educated at both Tonbridge School and Rugby School, before going up to Trinity College, Cambridge. While studying at Cambridge, Capron made two appearances in first-class cricket for the Marylebone Cricket Club against Hampshire at Lord's in 1881, and Cambridge University at Fenner's in 1882. He scored 13 runs in these two matches, with a highest score of 11. After graduating from Cambridge, Capron was admitted to practice as a solicitor in 1886. In 1936, he successfully sued his brother, George and his sister-in-law, for libel following letters they had written to The Reverend Brian Hunt; Capron was awarded £1,000 in damages. Capron died at Kensington in January 1942.
