= Moses Hammond House =

Historic house in North Carolina, United States

- U.S. National Register of Historic Places
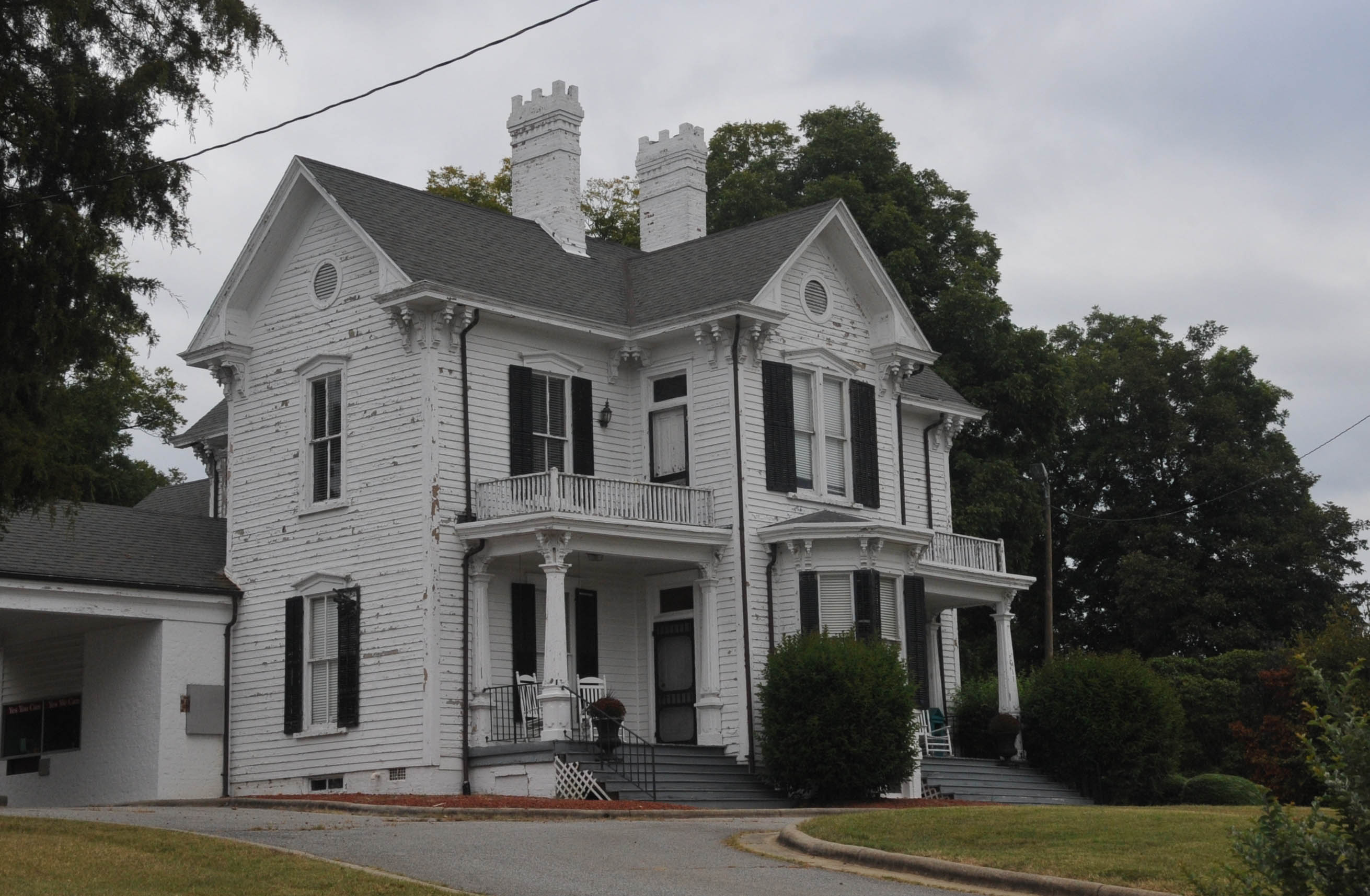
- Moses Hammond House, March 2007

- Location within North Carolina Location within the United States
- Location: 118 Trindale Rd., Archdale, North Carolina
- Coordinates: 35°54′51″N 79°58′31″W
- Area: 2.4 acres (0.97 ha)
- Built: 1880
- Built by: Pett, W.C, Sash & Blind Co.
- Architectural style: Italianate
- NRHP reference No.: 89000466
- Added to NRHP: June 12, 1989

Moses Hammond House, also known as the Ragan House, is a historic home in Archdale, Randolph County, North Carolina. It was built about 1880 and is a two-story, cruciform=plan, Italianate-style frame dwelling. It has a cross-gable roof with a front projecting bay with flanking decorative one-story frame porches. Also on the property is a barn. The house was adapted for use as a branch bank in 1988.

The building with the barn contributing was added to the National Register of Historic Places in 1989.
