= Victor Capron =

American politician

Victor James Capron Sr
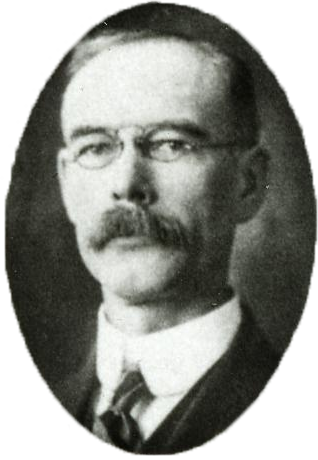
- Capron in 1913

Member of the Washington House of Representatives for the 52nd district
- In office 1913-1917; 1923-1927

Mayor of Friday Harbor
- In office 1912-1914; 1930-1932

Member, Friday Harbor Town Council
- In office 1911-1912

Personal details
- Born: August 25, 1868 Boonville, Oneida County, New York, United States
- Died: November 16, 1934 (aged 66) Seattle, Washington, United States
- Party: Republican
- Spouse: Fanny Valentine Kirk (1874-1956)
- Relations: father-in-law Peter Kirk Jr (steel manufacturer and founder of Kirkland, Washington)
- Children: Marjorie Kirk Capron (1903-1973) and Victor James Capron Jr (1908-1986)
- Education: Jefferson Medical College, Philadelphia, Pennsylvania, 1888
- Occupation: physician and legislator

Dr. Victor James Capron Sr (August 25, 1868 - November 16, 1934) was a physician and politician in the state of Washington.

He was born in Boonville, Oneida County, New York; a graduate of Jefferson Medical College in Philadelphia, Pennsylvania in 1888; a resident physician at St. Luke's Hospital in South Bethlehem, Pennsylvania; and a surgeon at the Norwegian Deaconess Home and Hospital in Brooklyn, New York.

In 1893, he became a government physician in Kau, Hawaii, where he was credited with containing a cholera epidemic.

In 1898, he became the town doctor at Roche Harbor, Washington. He opened a hospital in Friday Harbor; established the island's first telephone system (1901) so he could better respond to medical needs in Friday Harbor and Roche Harbor; invented an X-ray machine powered by his vehicle so he could assess injuries on-site; and invested in agricultural enterprises.

He served as a Friday Harbor Town Council member (1911–1912); Friday Harbor mayor (1912-1914 and 1930–1932); Washington House of Representatives member (1913–1917 and 1923–1927); and Washington State Board of Health member (1919–1934).

His most well-known legacies as a legislator on San Juan Island include Trout Lake Dam, the town's freshwater system established when he was mayor of Friday Harbor; and the Capron Fund, which returns to Island County and San Juan County a portion of gas tax revenue and vehicle registration fees they generate to help fund road maintenance and construction. Those counties are separated by water from the state's road network.

Dr. Capron married Fanny Valentine Kirk (1874-1956) in 1901. She was the daughter of Peter Kirk Jr (1840-1916) who was a steel manufacturer and founder of Kirkland, Washington. The Caprons' son, Victor James Capron Jr (1908-1986), served on the Friday Harbor Town Council from 1934 to 1941. A grandson, Victor Capron (1934-), served on the Friday Harbor Town Council from 1976 to 1979 and on the San Juan County Marine Resources Committee.

In 1934, Dr. Capron died at Virginia Mason Hospital in Seattle, Washington from tuberculosis & streptococcal sepsis.

Dr. Capron is the subject of chapter five in the book "Roche Harbor" (Arcadia Publishing, 2009).
