= Jules Frere House =

Historic house in Florida, United States

- U.S. National Register of Historic Places
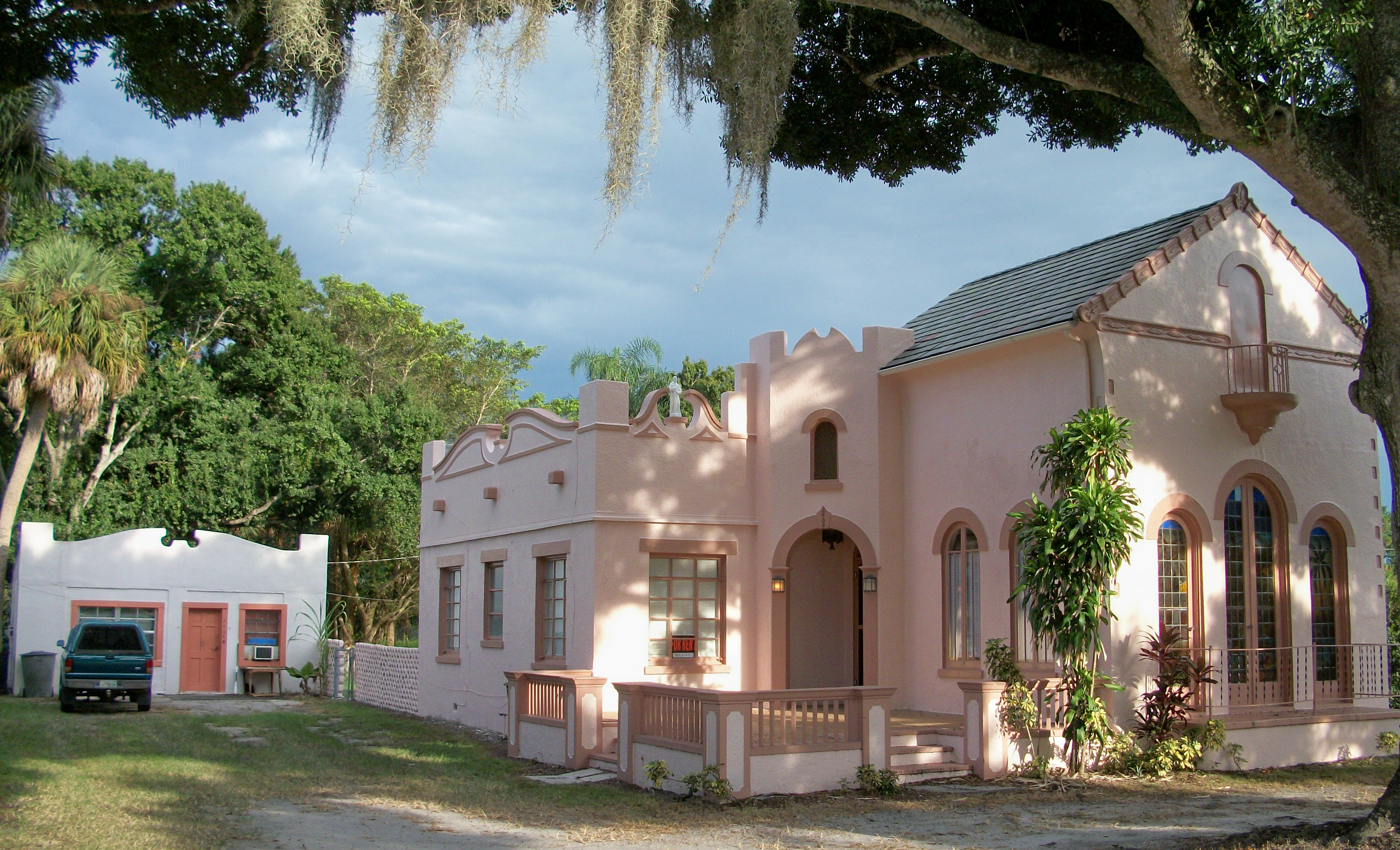

- Location within Florida Location within the United States
- Location: 2404 Sunrise Boulevard; Fort Pierce, Florida 34982
- Coordinates: 27°25′27″N 80°20′6″W
- Built: 1931
- Architectural style: Mission Revival, Spanish Revival
- NRHP reference No.: 95000467
- Added to NRHP: April 20, 1995

The Jules Frere House is a historic house located at 2404 Sunrise Boulevard in Fort Pierce, Florida. It is locally significant as one of the best examples of the Spanish Colonial Revival style in Fort Pierce, maintaining its original qualities exceptionally well.

== Description and history ==
Jules Frere was a Fort Pierce merchant and owner of Sunrise Lumber Company. He built the original square, flat-roofed structure and subsequently added the front cathedral portion which was completed in 1931.

The cathedral has leaded stained glass in the spine of the ceiling and detailed Florida themed leaded stained glass in the west-facing French doors. A spiral staircase, which is no longer in existence, leads to a door leading out onto the flat roof of the original structure. The unique functional wood-burning fireplace is surrounded by marble with decorative appointments. The cathedral structure ceiling and upper walls are plaster, with roughly the lower 6ft of the walls tiled to the floor. The floors of the structure are tile.

The Underwood family purchased the home from Jules Frere. Around 1940 it was sold to the McDonald family for $4,800.00

In a game of football, the McDonald children damaged the stained glass doors. Famed Florida artist Albert Ernest A. E. Backus, also known as Beanie Backus, was commissioned to hand paint the broken lead tiles to match the broken glass.

Over the years the home changed ownership and the detached 2 car garage was converted into a full apartment.

In 2017, the property and adjacent acreage was again sold. Current resident has painstakingly renovated the features of the home, including authentic roofing and wrought iron work. Fruit trees, landscaping and upgraded hardscape on the site as well as the adjoining 2 acres has been completed.

The interior layout of the Historic home has stayed relatively the same since it was finished in 1931. An arched entryway separates the cathedral addition from the original section. Arched doorways continue into the kitchen and mudroom. Original hardwood flooring runs throughout the dining area and bedrooms. The bathroom, kitchen and mudroom/laundry have tiled flooring.

The east-facing backdoor opens out to the expansive 2 acre backyard filled with native plants, tropical fruit trees, and oak and pine trees draped in Spanish moss. A new hardscape walkway leads to the parking area and apartment which were added in 2019.

It was added to the National Register of Historic Places on April 20, 1995.

== Gallery ==
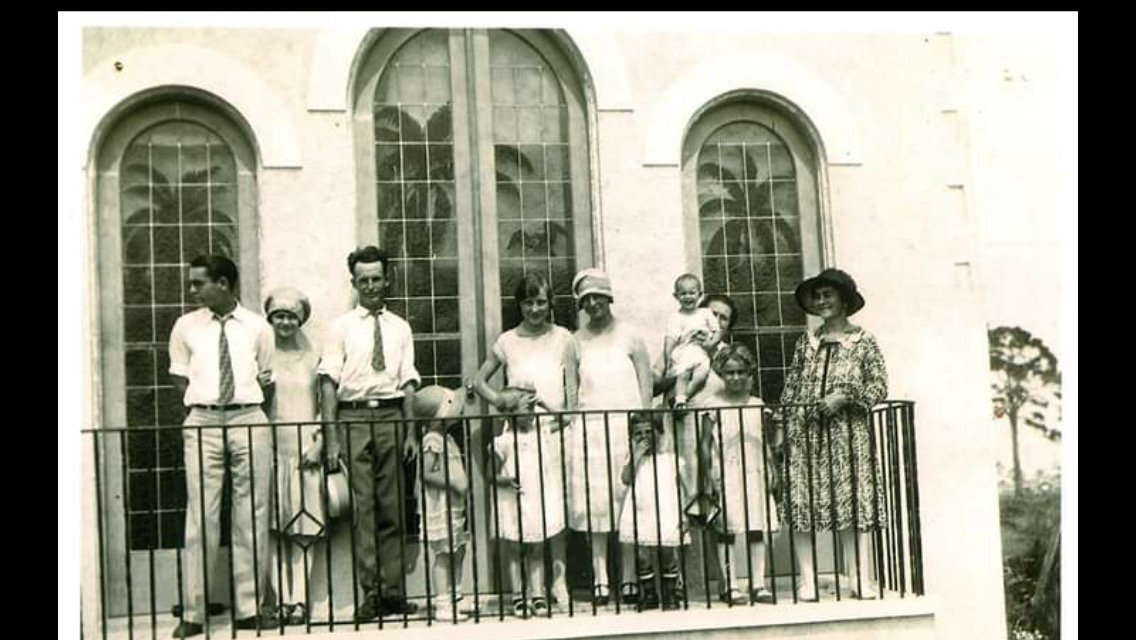

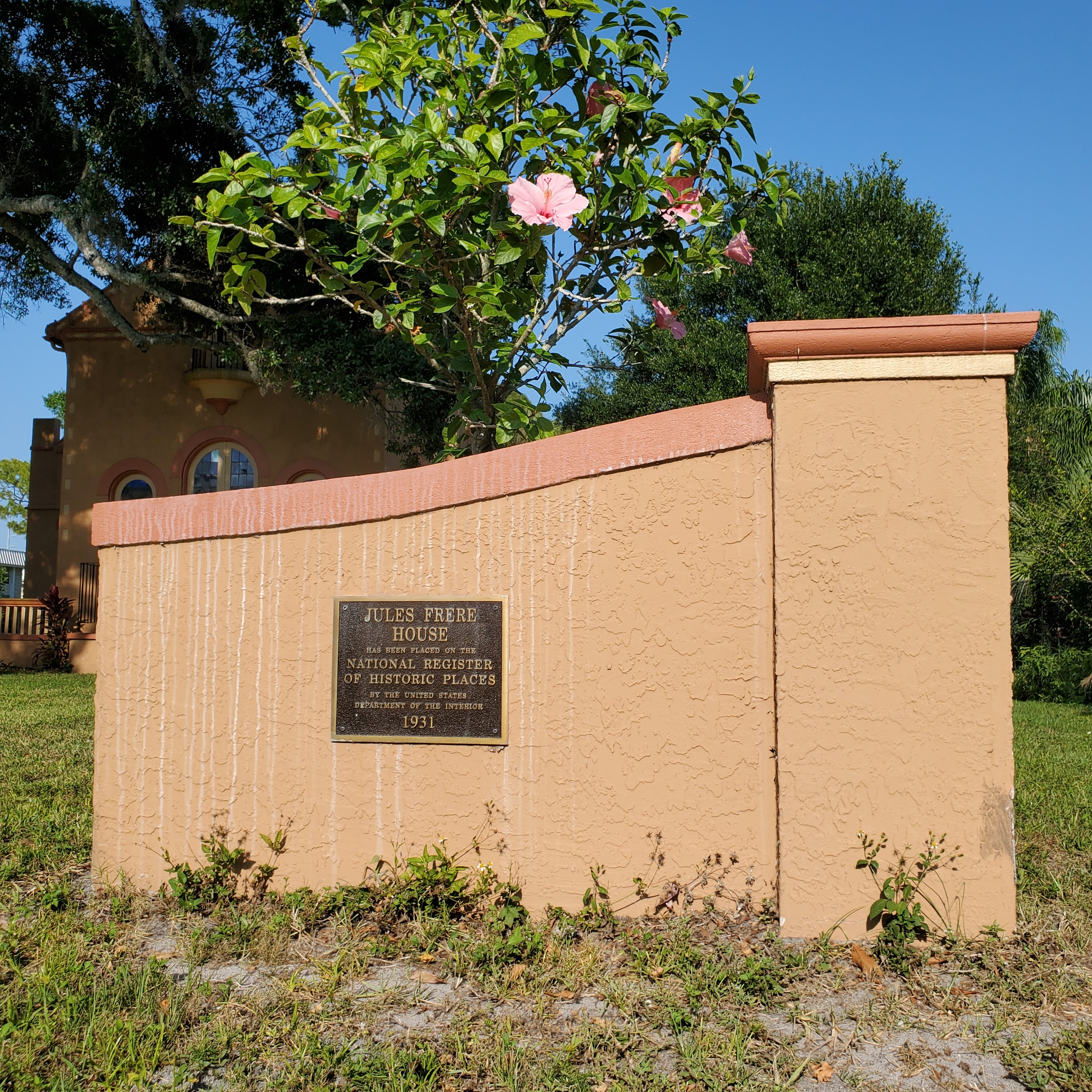

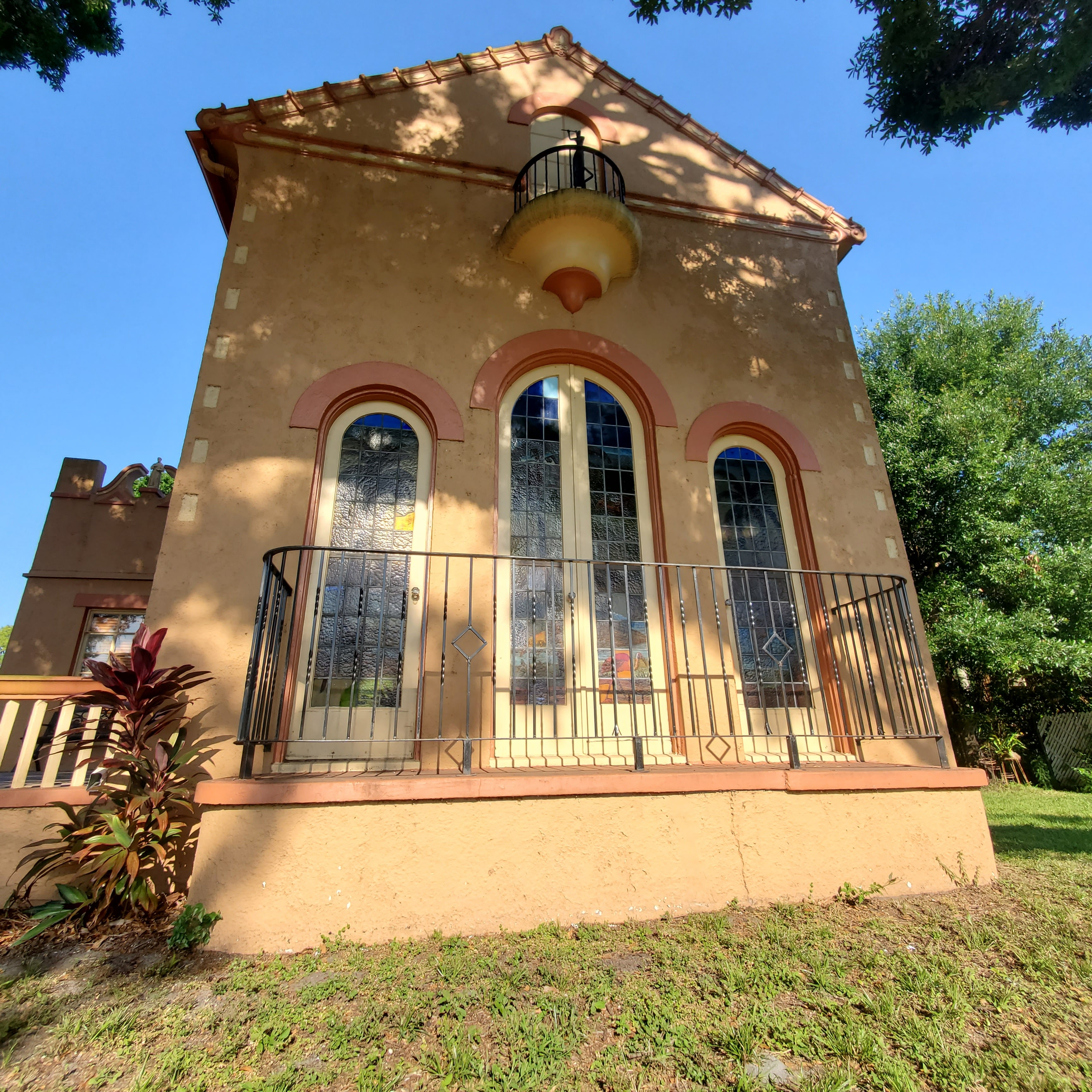

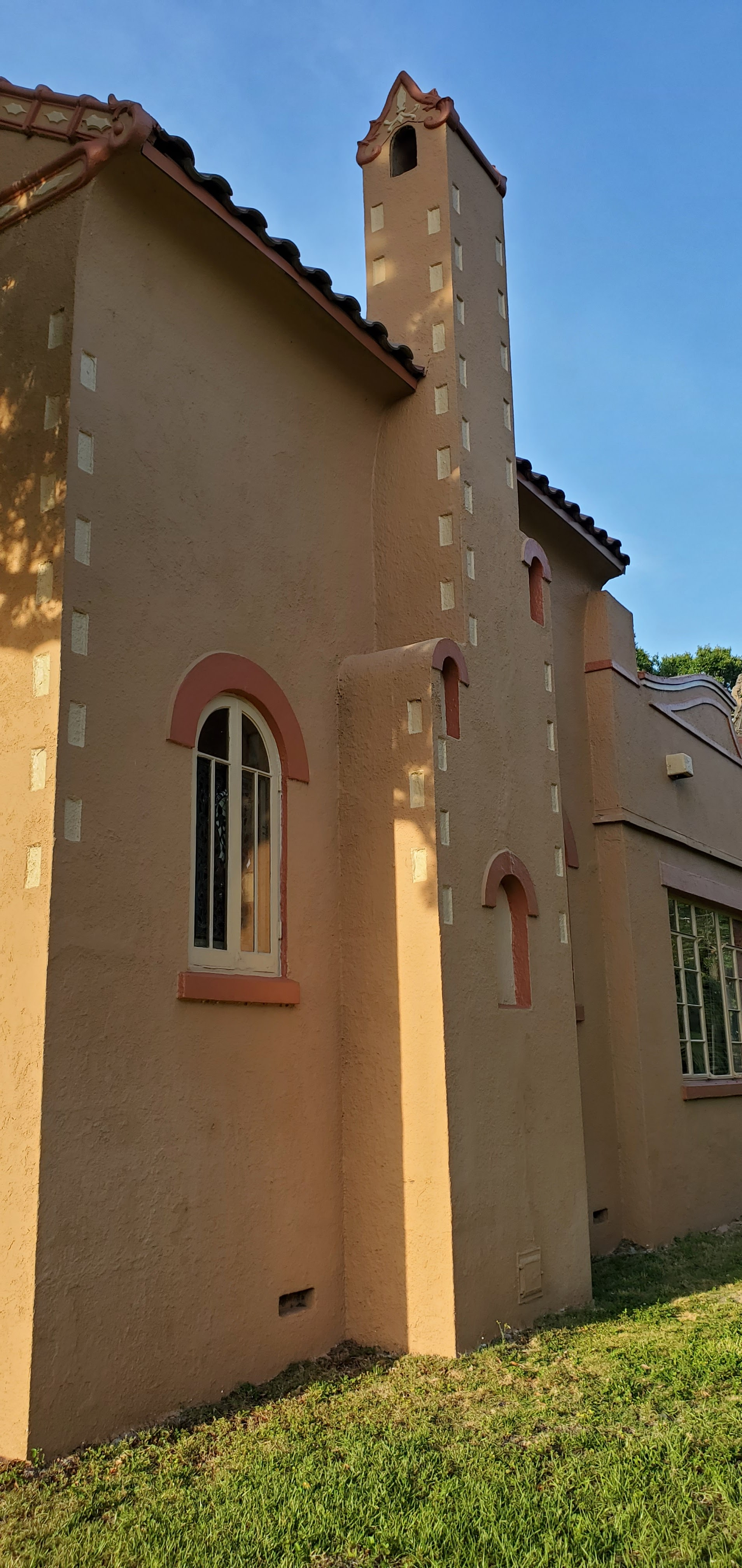

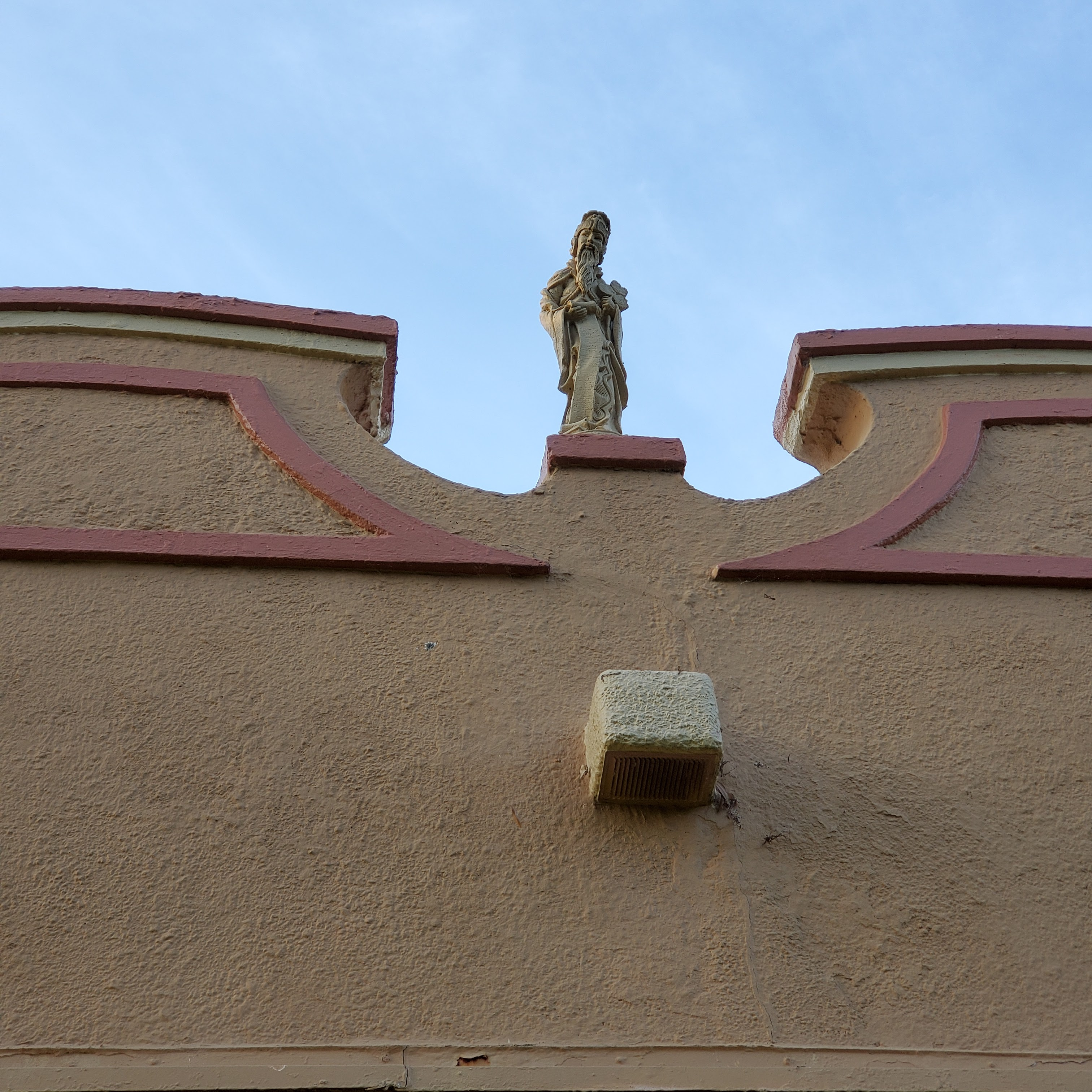

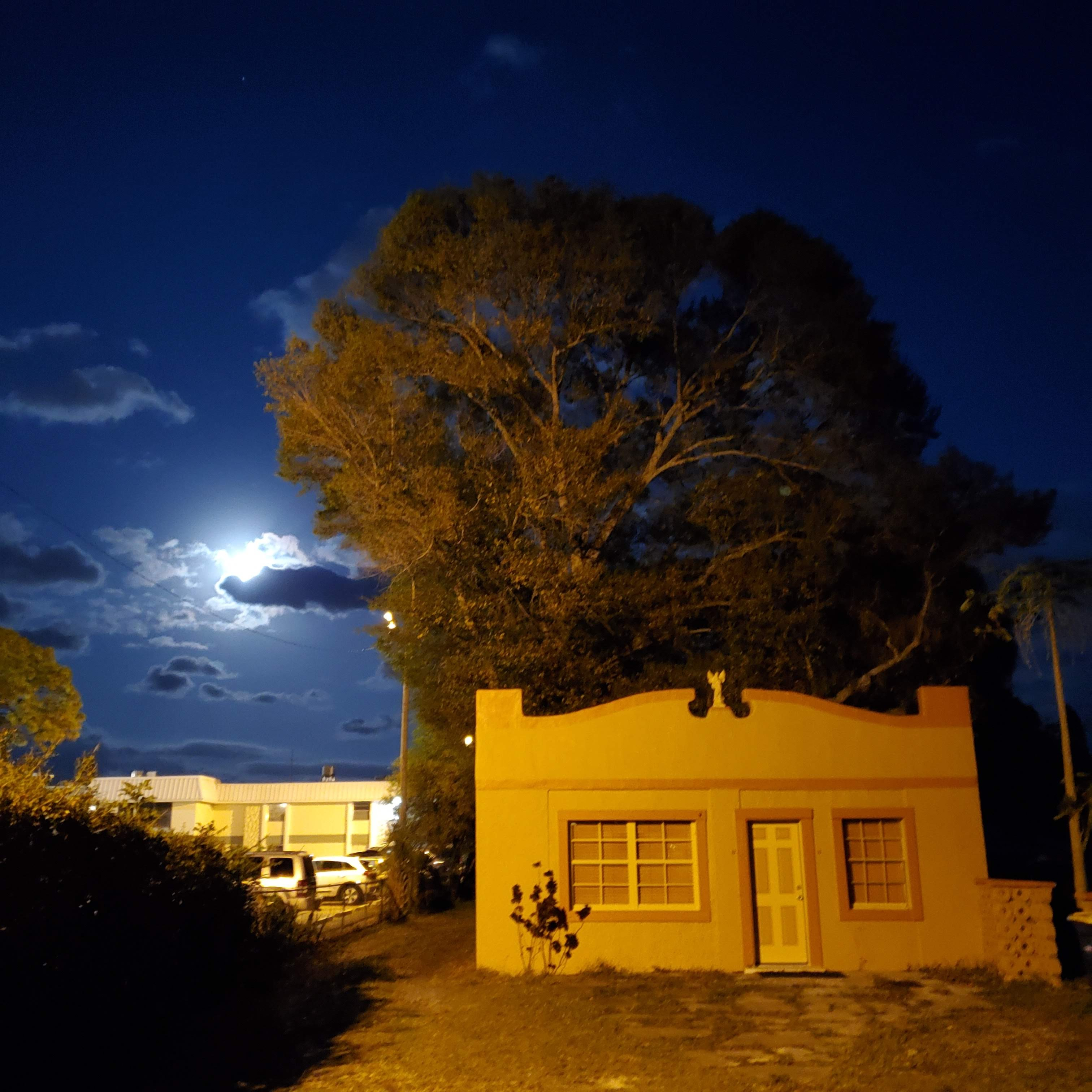

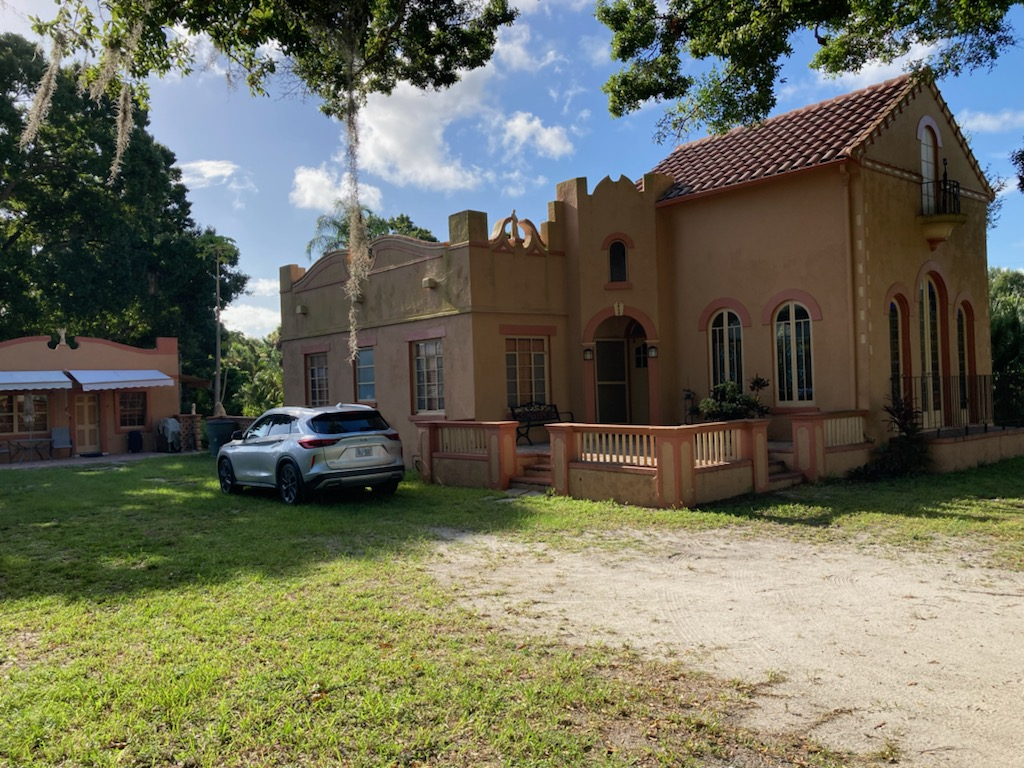

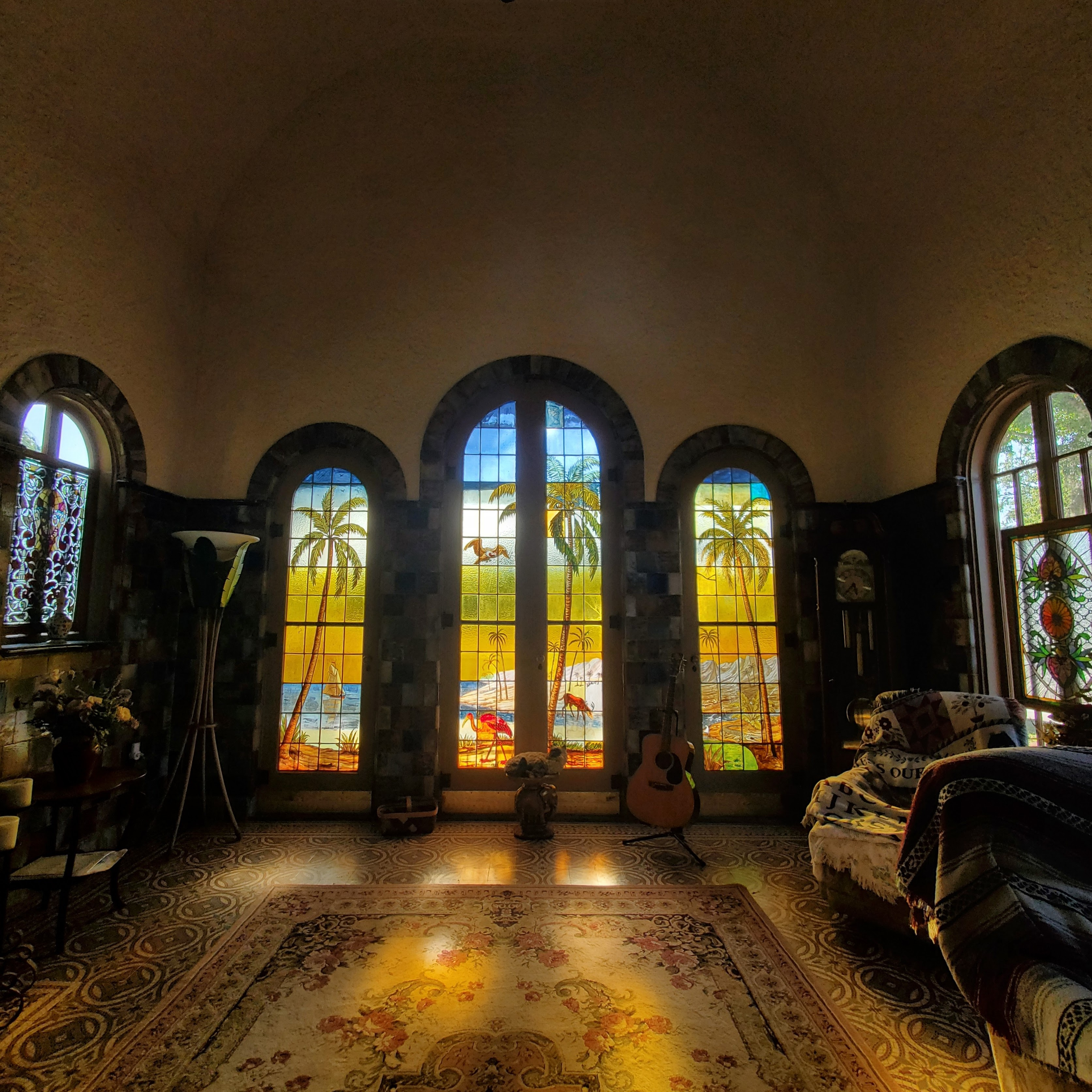

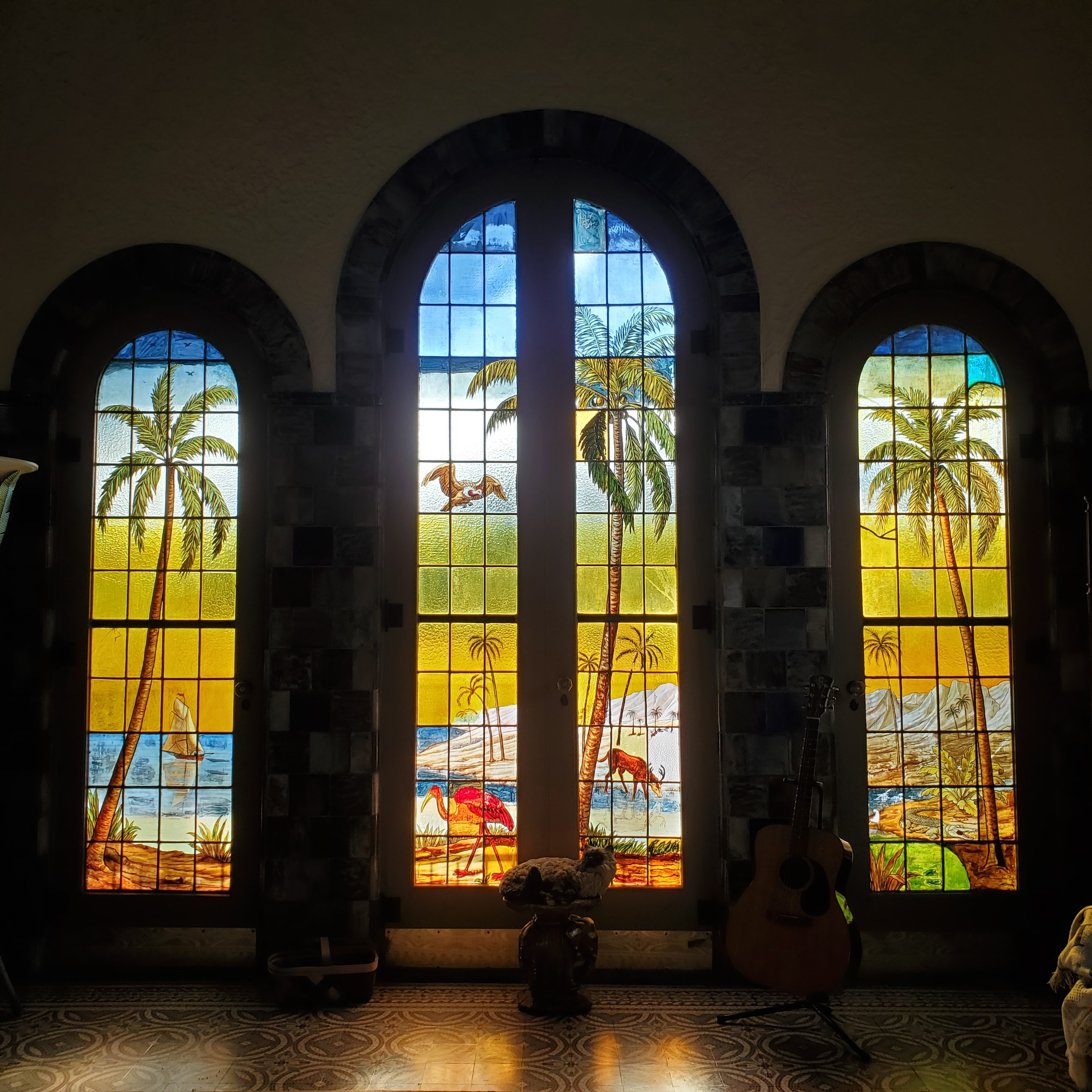

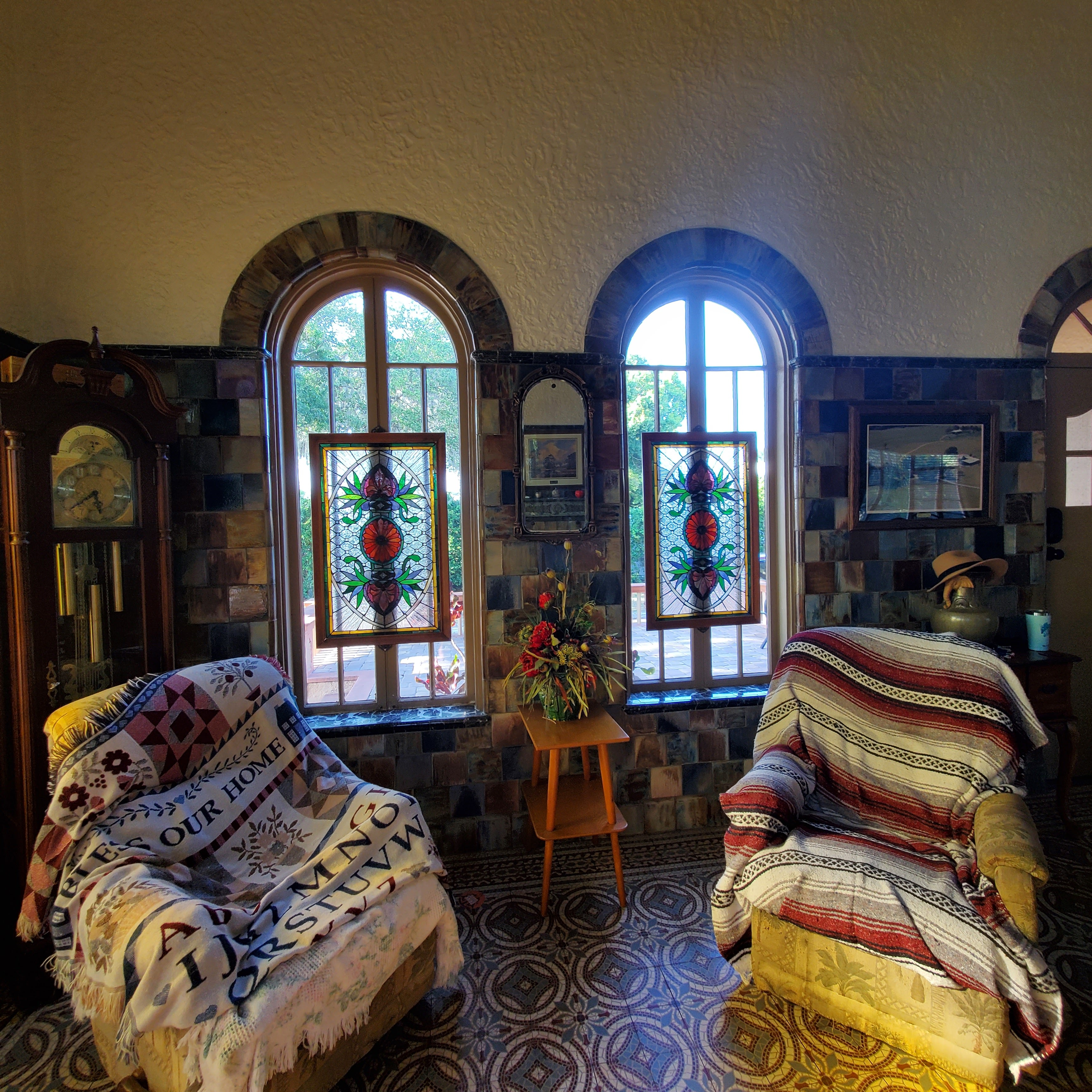

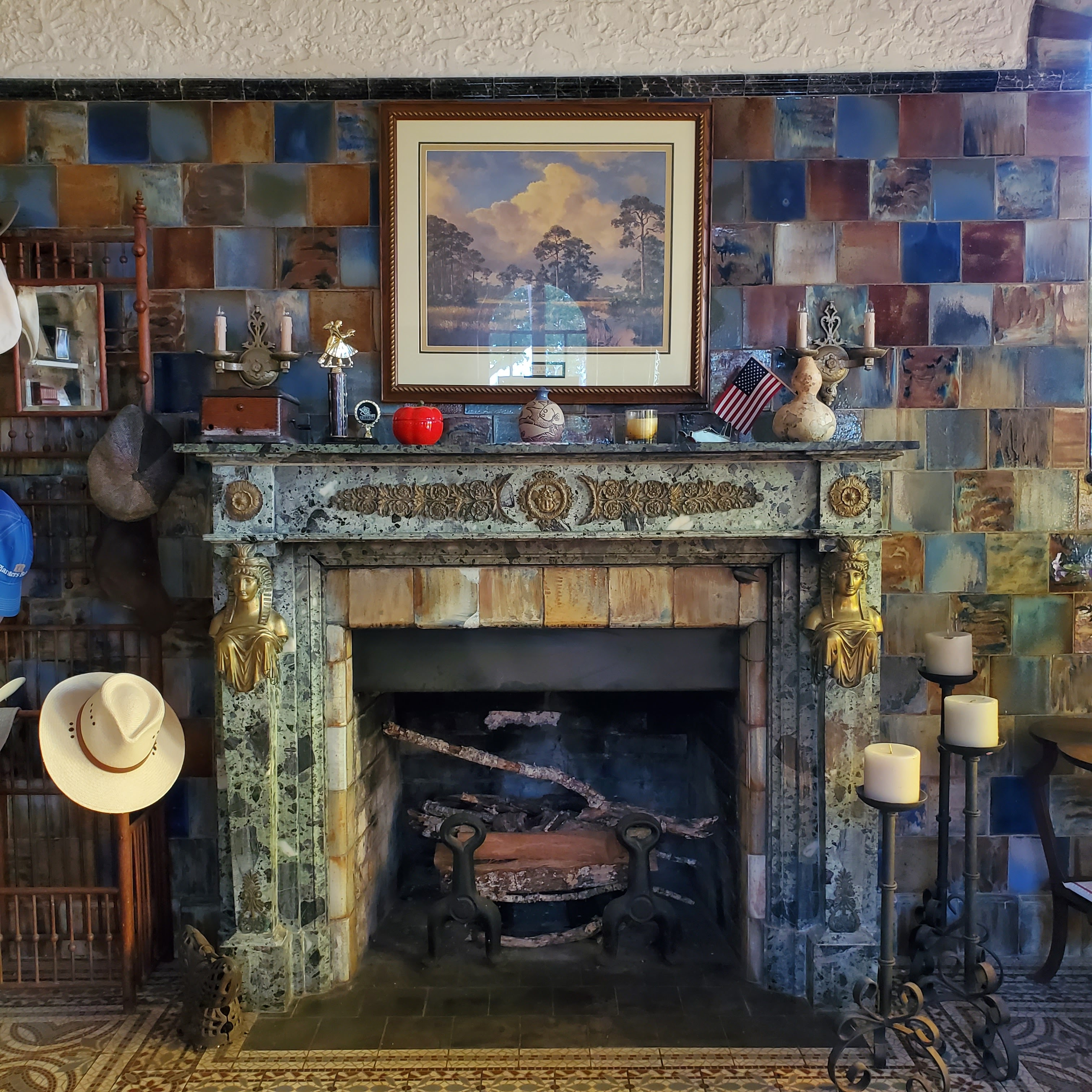

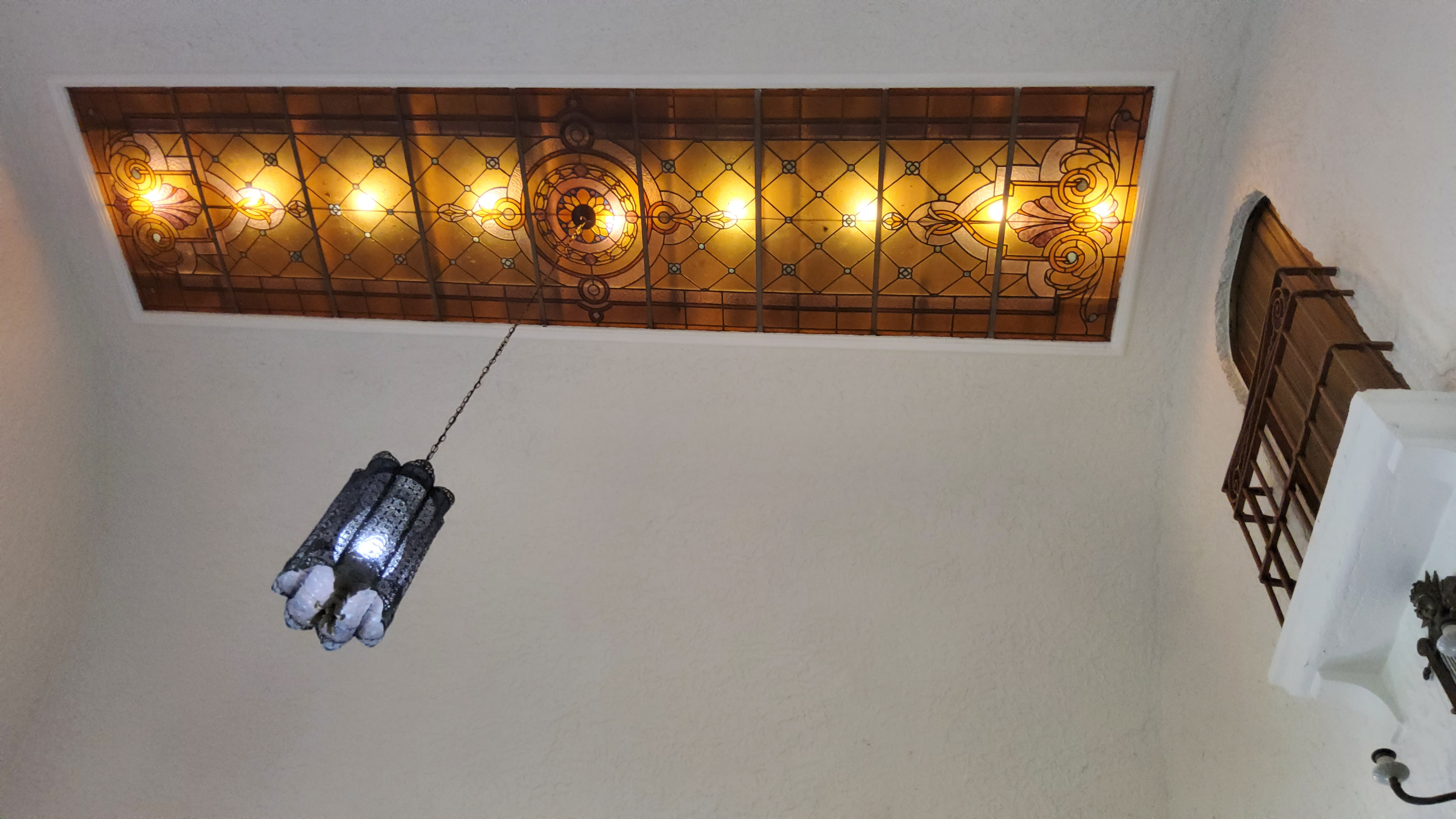
