= Old St. Anastasia Catholic School =

Historic church in Florida, United States

- U.S. National Register of Historic Places
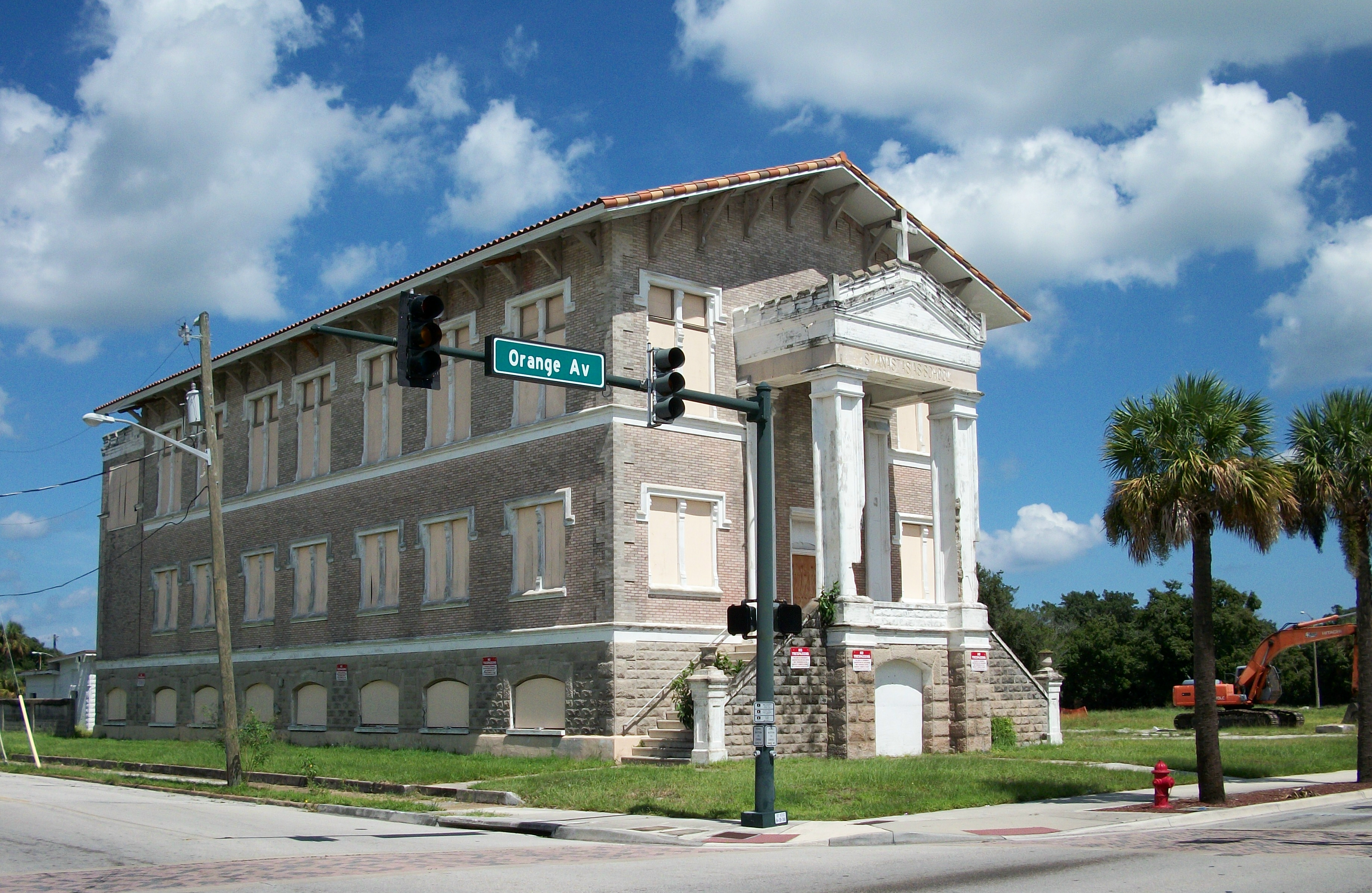

- Location within Florida Location within the United States
- Location: 910 Orange Avenue, Fort Pierce, Florida
- Coordinates: 27°26′50″N 80°19′58″W
- Built: 1914
- NRHP reference No.: 00000941
- Added to NRHP: August 10, 2000

Built in 1914, the Old St. Anastasia Catholic School is a historic school in Fort Pierce, Florida, at 910 Orange Avenue. On August 10, 2000, it was added to the U.S. National Register of Historic Places.
