= Mary Alice Hammond House =

Historic house in Arkansas, United States

- U.S. National Register of Historic Places
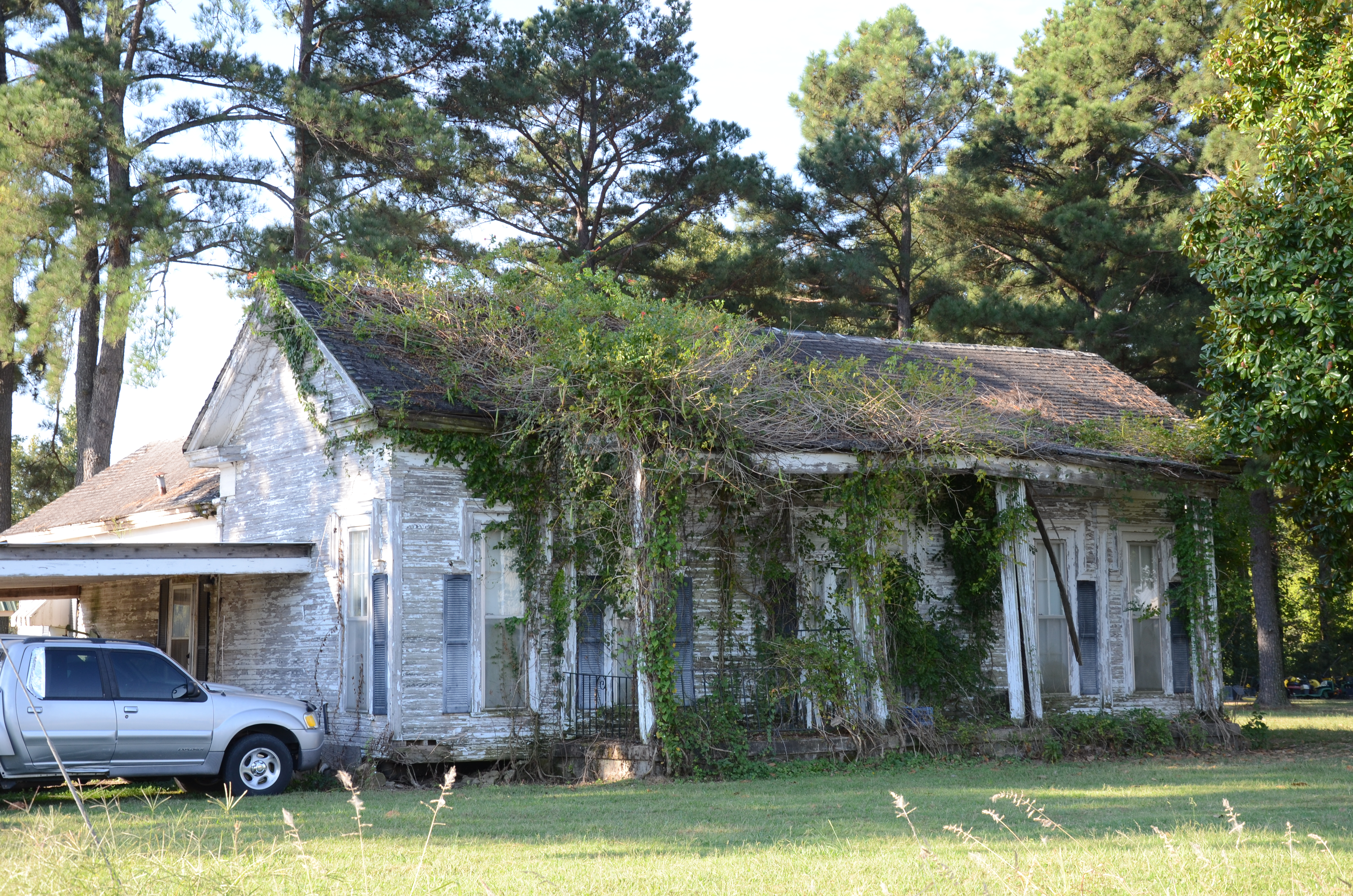

- Location within Arkansas Location within the United States
- Location: Co. Rd. 839 W of jct. with AR 367, Searcy, Arkansas
- Coordinates: 35°11′41″N 91°44′4″W
- Area: less than one acre
- Built: 1870
- MPS: White County MPS
- NRHP reference No.: 91001204
- Added to NRHP: July 21, 1992

The Mary Alice Hammond House is a historic house on the southern outskirts of Searcy, Arkansas. It is located on the south side of Lee Lane (County Road 839), just west of its junction with Arkansas Highway 367. It is a single-story single-pile house with a side gable roof, and a porch extending across its front (north-facing) facade. Its front entrance is flanked by sidelight windows, and topped by a transom, with a molded hood surround. This house was built around 1870, about ten blocks from the courthouse square in Searcy, and is a rare surviving 19th-century building from the period. It was moved to its present location in the 1950s.

The house was listed on the National Register of Historic Places in 1992.

== See also ==
- National Register of Historic Places listings in White County, Arkansas
