= Captain Hammond House =

Historic house in Florida, United States

- U.S. National Register of Historic Places
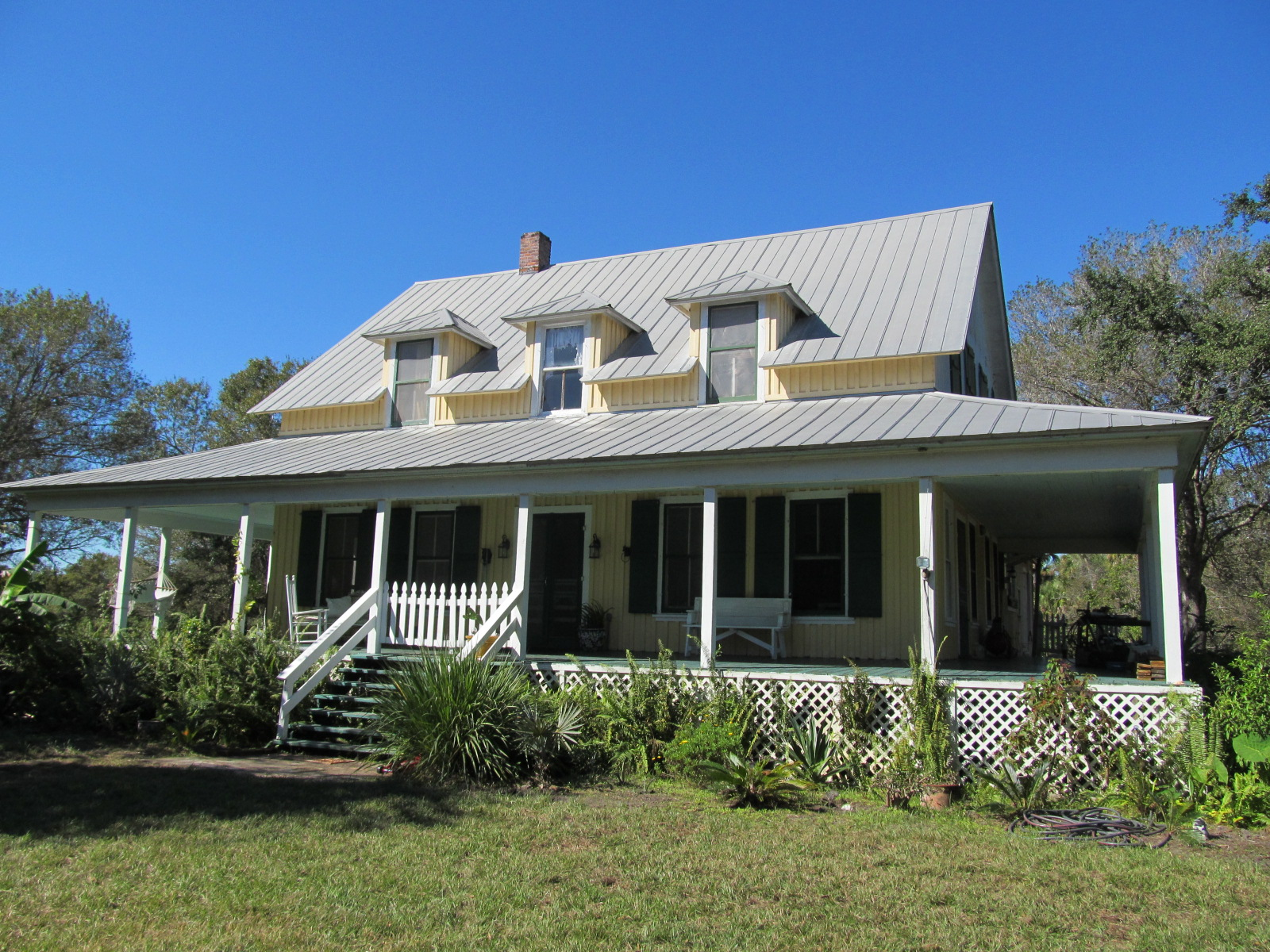
- Front view of the Captain Hammond House

- Location within Florida Location within the United States
- Location: 5775 Citrus Avenue White City, Florida 34982
- Coordinates: 27°21′49″N 80°20′34″W
- Built: 1902
- Architectural style: Frame Vernacular
- NRHP reference No.: 90000310
- Added to NRHP: 23 February 1990

The Captain Hammond House is a historic house located at 5775 Citrus Avenue in White City, Florida. It was built for and served as the home for the retired New England sea captain Robert A Hammond.

== Description and history ==
The house itself was completed in 1902 and was built by Danish craftsman in the Frame Vernacular style influenced by Danish architectural styles. On February 23, 1990, it was added to the U.S. National Register of Historic Places.
