= Jonathan Hammond House =

Historic house in Massachusetts, United States

- U.S. National Register of Historic Places
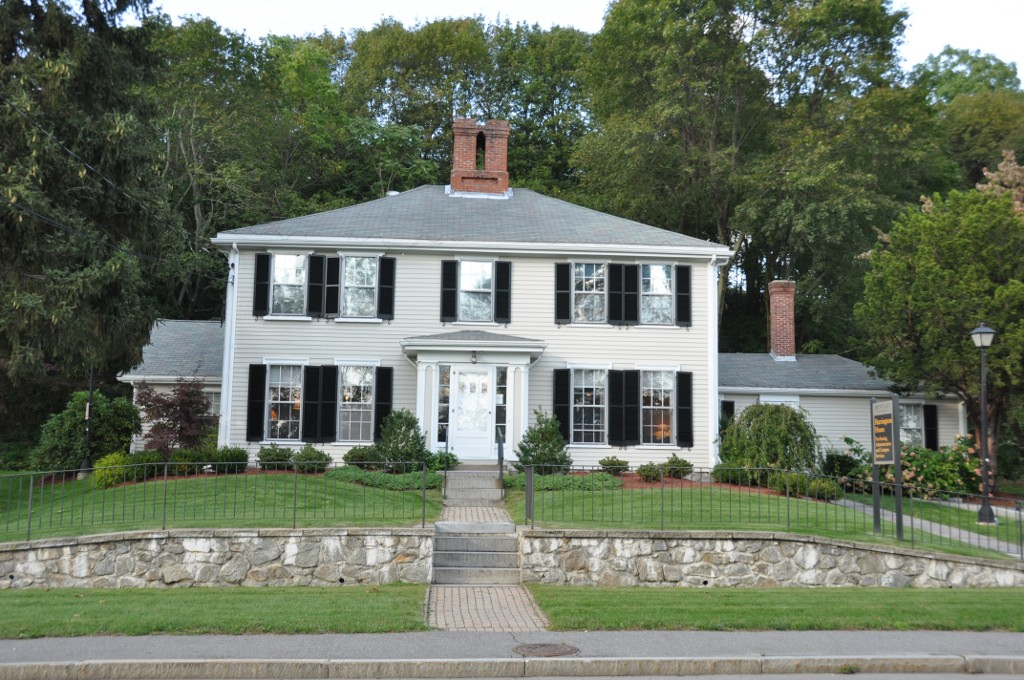

- Location within Massachusetts Location within the United States
- Location: 311 Beaver St., Waltham, Massachusetts
- Coordinates: 42°23′6″N 71°13′0″W
- Built: 1785
- Architectural style: Georgian
- MPS: Waltham MRA
- NRHP reference No.: 89001491
- Added to NRHP: September 28, 1989

The Jonathan Hammond House, located at 311 Beaver Street in Waltham, Massachusetts, is a historic residence. This 2½-story wood-frame house was constructed in 1785 by Jonathan Hammond, a member of a prominent local family. The house features transitional late Georgian and early Federal styling and is one of the more substantial houses from the period to survive in the city. It has also been owned by the Lyman and Warren families, who are also locally prominent families.

The house was listed on the National Register of Historic Places in 1989. It is now owned by Bentley University and serves as office space for some of its departments.

== See also ==
- Ephraim Hammond House
- National Register of Historic Places listings in Waltham, Massachusetts
