= Casa Caprona =

- U.S. National Register of Historic Places
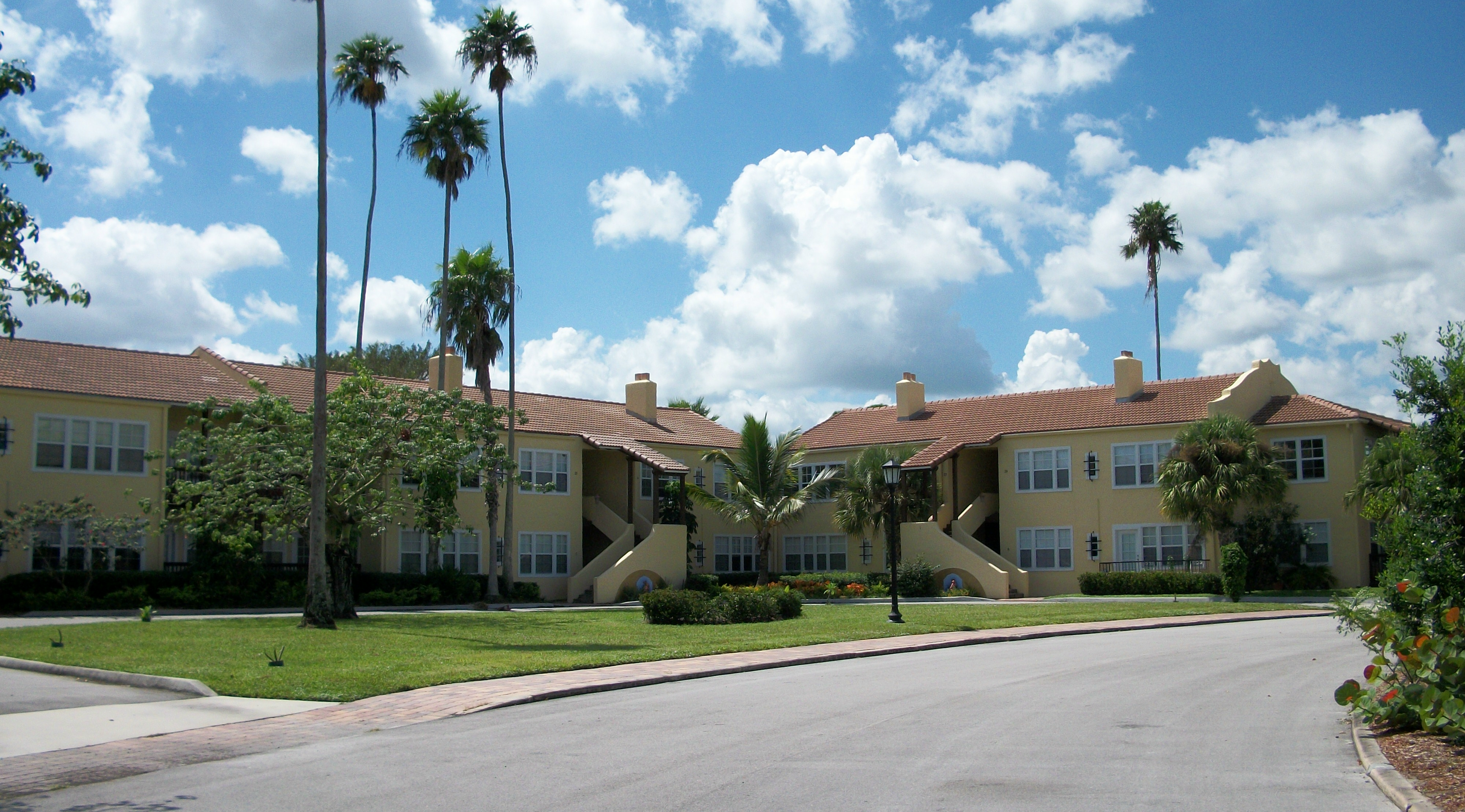
- Casa Caprona, 2009

- Location within Florida Location within the United States
- Location: 2605 St. Lucie Boulevard; Fort Pierce, Florida 34946
- Coordinates: 27°28′59″N 80°21′6″W
- Built: 1926
- Architect: Arthur Beck, J.K. Shinn
- Architectural style: Mediterranean Revival
- NRHP reference No.: 84000955
- Added to NRHP: 2 June 1984

The Casa Caprona (also known as the Markert Apartments) is a historic building at 2605 St. Lucie Boulevard in Fort Pierce, Florida, US, built in 1926. The complex was designed in the Mediterranean Revival style by architects Arthur Beck and J.K. Shinn, and was built by T.H. Markenthaler and T.H. Kertshner. For a period of time the complex housed people training in the Navy's underwater demolition group during WWII. The complex was envisioned as the centerpiece for the proposed winter community of San Lucie Plaza. However, due to the collapse of the Florida land boom, the project failed.

After a collaborative effort from the Casa Carpona condominium association the property was named a landmark in 1984. On June 2, 1984, it was added to the U.S. National Register of Historic Places.

== Gallery ==
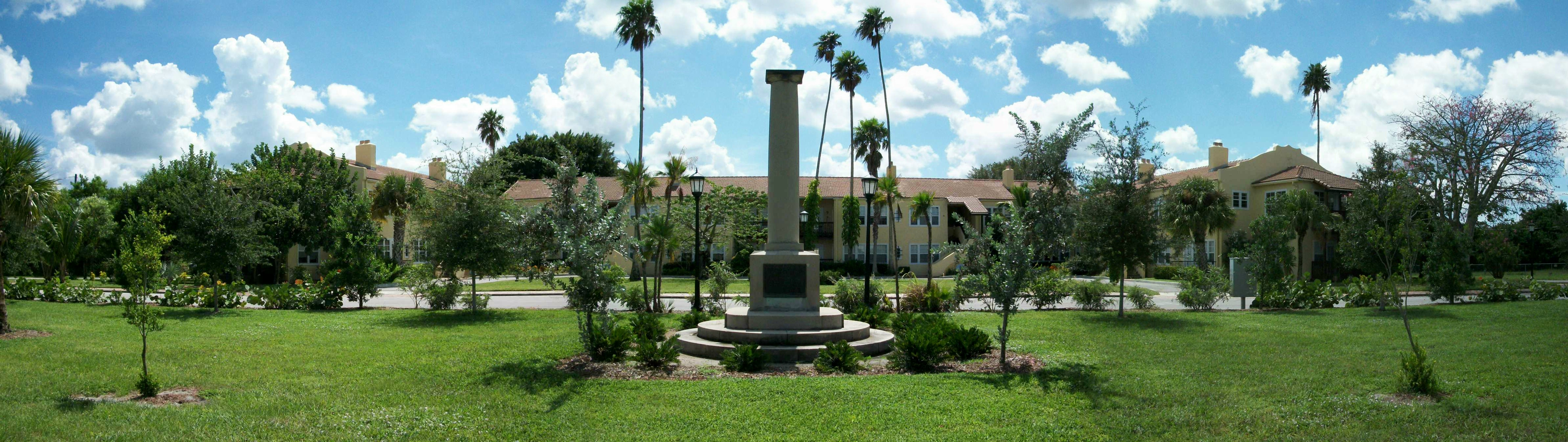
