= List of county roads in Martin County, Florida =

- County road shields used in Florida

Highway names
- Interstates: Interstate X (I-X)
- US Highways: U.S. Highway X (US X)
- State: State Road X (SR X)
- County: County Road X (CR X)

System links
- County roads in Florida; County roads in Martin County

Martin County, Florida (located in South-East Florida), operates a system of county roads that serve all portions of the county. The Martin County Roadway Design & Construction Division is responsible for maintaining all of the Martin County roads.

The numbers and routes of all Florida highways are assigned by the Florida Department of Transportation (FDOT), while county road numbers are assigned by the counties, with guidance from FDOT. North-south routes are generally assigned odd numbers, while east-west routes are generally assigned even numbers.

== List of County Roads in Martin County, Florida ==
Number	Length (mi)	Length (km)	Southern or western terminus	Northern or eastern terminus	Local names	Formed	Removed	Notes
CR A1A	—	—	US 1 at Hobe Sound	SR A1A / SR 714 at Stuart		—	—	Former SR A1A
CR 5A	—	—	US 1	CR A1A		—	—	Former SR 5A
CR 76A	—	—	SR 76 / CR 711	CR 714		—	—	Former SR 76A
CR 609	—	—	SR 710	Martin–St. Lucie county line	SW Allapata Road	—	—	Former SR 609
CR 707	—	—	Palm Beach–Martin county line	CR 708		—	—	Former SR 707
CR 707	—	—	CR A1A	Martin–St. Lucie county line		—	—	Former SR 707
CR 707A	—	—	SR 732 / CR 723	—		—	—	Former SR 707A
CR 708	—	—	SR 76	CR 707		—	—	Former SR 708
CR 711	—	—	Palm Beach–Martin county line	SR 76 / CR 76A		—	—	Former SR 711
CR 713	—	—	I-95 (Exit 110)	SR 714 in Martin Downs	SW High Meadow Avenue	—	—	Connects SR 714 and CR 714 to I-95
CR 714	—	—	SR 710	I-95 / SR 714	SW Martin Highway	—	—	Former SR 714
CR 714	—	—	Turnpike / SR 714 (Exit 133)	US 1	SW Martin Highway, SW 36th Street, SE Indian Street	—	—	Former SR 714; Other than a reassurance sign east of the intersection with CR 713, the entire roadway east of CR 713 is unsigned. Historically, the CR 713 designation (along with the roadway) terminated at Mapp Road.
CR 722	—	—	SR 76	CR A1A		—	—	Former SR 722
CR 723	—	—	CR 707	SR 732 / CR 707A		—	—	Former SR 723
CR 726	—	—	SR 710	CR 76A		—	—	Former SR 726
