= Florida State Road 714 =

State highway in Florida, United States

State Road 714
- SR 714 in red, CR 714 in blue

Route information
- Maintained by FDOT
- Length: 12.384 mi (19.930 km)
- Existed: 1945 renumbering (definition)–present

Major junctions
- West end: SR 710 near Okeechobee
- I-95 near Palm City; US 1 in Stuart
- East end: SR A1A in Stuart

Location
- Country: United States
- State: Florida
- Counties: Martin

Highway system
- Florida State Highway System; Interstate; US; State; Former; Pre‑1945; Toll; Scenic
← SR 713	→ SR 715

State Road 714 (SR 714) is a 12.4-mile-long (20.0 km) east–west highway serving northern Martin County, Florida, running from just west of Interstate 95 (I-95) near Palm City to an intersection with Southeast Ocean Boulevard (SR A1A and County Road A1A or CR A1A) in Stuart. The route is known locally as Martin Highway, Martin Downs Boulevard, and Southeast Monterey Road.

== Route description ==
State Road 714 begins about 0.4 miles (0.64 km) west of I-95, where the road transitions from County Road 714 to meet with the interchange with I-95.

West of State Road 76, SR 714 was primarily a rural road passing near Palm City before entering the wetlands between Lake Okeechobee and the coast; east of SR 76, State Road 714 is primarily a commercial road, passing near Witham Field, an airport near the eastern end of the route and just outside the Stuart city limit.

To the east of the Turnpike interchange, Martin Highway is another section of County Road 714.

== History ==
In the 1945 renumbering, SR 714 was formed using the older State Road 111, with the route running from SR 710 to US 1. At one point, the western terminus was truncated to Florida's Turnpike (SR 91), five miles (8 km) to the east of the current western terminus, and extended to SR A1A at the eastern end.

SR 714 has recently been connected with Port St. Lucie Boulevard, extending north from the Citrus Boulevard (County Road 76A) intersection.

== Major intersections ==
The entire route is in Martin County.

Location	mi	km	Destinations	Notes
Okeechobee	0.000	0.000	SR 710 (Southwest Warfield Boulevard) – Okeechobee, Indiantown	
Indiantown	12.195	19.626	CR 609 (Southwest Allapattah Road) – Indiantown, Fort Pierce, Port St Lucie, Okeechobee	
	17.417	28.030	west end of state maintenance	
	17.84	28.71	I-95 (SR 9) – Daytona Beach, West Palm Beach	I-95 exit 110
	22.218	35.756	CR 76A south (Southwest Citrus Boulevard) – Port St Lucie, Indiantown	
Palm City	23.349	37.577	Florida's Turnpike (SR 91) / CR 714 east (Martin Highway) to I-95 south	Turnpike exit 133
Palm City	24.312	39.126	CR 713 south (Southwest High Meadow Avenue) to I-95 south	
Palm City	25.824	41.560	Mapp Road (CR 714 west)	
Palm City	26.41	42.50	Palm City Bridge over St. Lucie River South Fork (Okeechobee Waterway)	
Stuart	26.891	43.277	SR 76 (Kanner Highway) to I-95 – Downtown Stuart	
Stuart	27.949	44.980	US 1 (Southeast Federal Highway / SR 5)	
Stuart	28.191	45.369	CR A1A (Dixie Highway)	
Stuart	29.801	47.960	SR A1A east (East Ocean Boulevard / CR A1A west) – Hutchinson Island, Beaches	
1.000 mi = 1.609 km; 1.000 km = 0.621 mi
