= Thomas B. Manuel =

American politician

Thomas Brown Manuel (November 3, 1898 – August 13, 1987) was an American community leader, politician and state official in Florida, often referred to as the "Father of the Florida's Turnpike" for his efforts to bring about the first major highway in Florida, and for his contributions generally to economic development in the state.

== Early life ==
He was born November 3, 1898, near Freetown, Jackson County, Indiana, the second child of Sarah Jane and Asbury Hill Manuel. His paternal grandfather, Dr. Grafton Manuel, was the attending physician at his birth. Thomas had two sisters Estella (1893–94) and Mary Catherine (1903–1935) as well as four brothers Virgil (1886–1957), Herschel (1887–1976), William (1891–1970) and Paul (1895–1925).

Seeking adventure and angered by Pancho Villa's raid on a New Mexico town, at 17, he enlisted in the army, and saw action in the Mexican Expedition of 1916, remaining in the army afterward, he eventually saw action in France during World War I.

Following his discharge from the army, Manuel attended the University of Illinois, earning a degree in animal husbandry, and set out to start a farm in Palm Beach County, Florida, near modern-day Delray Beach. He would ultimately settle further south, in Fort Lauderdale, where he and his wife Margaret would start a family. Daughter Ann was born in 1926. A second child died as an infant. Son and namesake Thomas Brown Manuel, Junior, was born in 1928.

== Civic leadership ==
To house their growing family, the Manuels bought a house at 543 Victoria Park Road from William Reed, a prominent South Florida pioneer and politician. Reed and Manuel became close friends, with Reed serving as mentor to Manuel. Reed encouraged Manuel's increasing involvement in the civic affairs of Fort Lauderdale. Manuel served a two-years term as mayor beginning in 1937.

After serving as a mayor, he re-entered the military and obtained a commission in 1940. He served with the 77th Infantry Division in the Pacific, seeing combat at Guam, Leyte Gulf, and Iwo Jima. In 1945, Manuel, who had been promoted to full colonel and would lead troops as they spent 45 consecutive days aboard ship under kamikaze attacks before participating in an amphibious landing on Okinawa.

Finally retiring from the army in 1946, Manuel returned to Fort Lauderdale, and resumed his involvement in public affairs, joining and serving as an officer in local Rotary and Kiwanis organizations, as well as supporting various political causes. He began a "second career" as a banking executive, eventually helping found and serving as a director at five separate banks, including Barnett Bank of Port Everglades, later Barnett Bank of Broward County. Barnett would, in time, become part of NationsBank, which ultimately became Bank of America, the largest bank in the world.

== Statewide politics and the turnpike ==
In 1952, seeking to end rural northern Florida's long dominance of state political affairs, Manuel and other like-minded leaders from the southern part of the state backed Dan McCarty, a young grovesman, fellow World War II veteran, and former speaker of the state house of representatives for governor. McCarty, ran on a platform of reform and economic progress, and was elected easily, but was felled by a massive heart attack only a few months into his term. Dismayed by McCarty's successor, Acting Governor Charley Johns, in the 1954 special election, Manuel supported LeRoy Collins.

In the early 1950s Manuel had met another south Florida businessman, Charles "Charlie" Costar, who had convinced him of the need for a new road from the state line to south Florida, one that by-passed many of the sleepy beach towns that dot Florida's east coast. Largely due to Costar's lobbying efforts, the state legislature had passed the Florida Turnpike Act in 1953, and then-Governor McCarty signed it into law.

During the interregnum of Charley John's acting governorship, the project largely languished. During the 1955 legislative session (the first during newly elected Governor LeRoy Collins' administration) there was a concerted effort to repeal the Turnpike Act and abolish the entire project, led by North Florida legislators known as the Pork Chop Gang. Having been appointed chairman of the Florida Turnpike Authority (the program's governing agency) in January 1955 by Governor Collins in one of his first official acts, Manuel almost single-handedly turned the situation around. By the end of the 1955 legislative session the bill to kill the Turnpike had been defeated 36–4, the original law had actually been amended to extend the planned route of the new road by another 110 miles from Fort Pierce to Miami, and a $70 million bond issue had been authorized to finance the first stage of construction.

== Father of the turnpike ==
Colonel Manuel served as chairman of the Turnpike Authority from 1955 to 1961. During his tenure, the first phase of construction began on July 4, 1955. By late 1956, owing to the Federal government's announced plans for a comprehensive interstate network of highways which would become the Interstate Highway System, and which was to include a route down Florida's east coast, designated I-95, which largely duplicated the Turnpike's originally-contemplated "Coastal Route" from Jacksonville to Fort Pierce, all work on the Turnpike stopped, and plans for further construction were shelved.

Construction had begun at what was expected to be the southern terminus of what was officially known as the Sunshine State Parkway, rather than near the (northern) state line, meaning the only portion to be completed before the hiatus was the 110 mile stretch between Fort Pierce and Miami, the extension Manuel had proposed and won approval for during the 1955 legislative session. The ribbon-cutting ceremony was held January 25, 1957.

Throughout the greater part of his service on the Turnpike Authority, Chairman Manuel was forced to contend with opposition from diverse segments of the political world, including those who felt it was a waste of tax dollars, rural interests unenthusiastic about devoting resources to a project seen as largely benefiting urban areas, tourism-based interests in the coastal towns of the counties between St. Augustine and Fort Lauderdale, railroad lines, and others. Nonetheless, he managed to gather sufficient support to keep the Turnpike alive.

Despite his initial disinclination to go forward with additional construction on the Turnpike, Governor Collins acknowledged the need for an extension of the Sunshine State Parkway that would connect Fort Pierce (and the under-construction I-95) with Orlando (and the proposed I-4 and I-75). The extension was approved in May, 1959.

In 1960, he received a letter from Governor Collins praising Colonel Manuel for his leadership of the highway project.

Later, near the end of his service on the Authority, another extension, adding 156 miles and connecting Orlando and Wildwood, would be approved. Days before both he and Manuel would leave office, Governor Collins authorized the sale of an additional $80 million in bonds to finance construction to Wildwood. That section would be dedicated July 24, 1964, and would mark the completion of the "Main Line" portion of the Parkway running from Miami to Wildwood.

During his time as chairman, Colonel Manuel deliberately took an active role in the management of the Turnpike, frequently driving to various destinations, visiting construction sites, and inspecting land parcels under consideration for acquisition, talking to road construction workers and managers and motorists. On one notable occasion, witnessing an accident, he quickly pulled to the side of the road and dove into a canal, dragging the wrecked cars occupants from the murky water in what, sadly, turned out to be futile efforts to save their lives.

== Later life and continued service ==
Leaving the chairmanship and the Turnpike Authority in 1961, Manuel resumed his banking interests, relocating to Plantation, Florida, a Fort Lauderdale suburb. A plaque memorializing Manuel's service to the State of Florida, and his successes as chairman of the Turnpike Authority marks the approach to the Thomas B. Manuel Bridge, which carries the Turnpike over the St. Lucie Canal, near Port Salerno, in east central Martin County. The plaque, near Mile Marker 130, officially recognizes Colonel Manuel as the "Father of the Turnpike".

He retired following his wife's death in 1981, but continued to maintain an active interest in the affairs of the Turnpike, following developments affecting the system closely, often attending hearings and meetings, and frequently speaking publicly on issues pertaining to the Turnpike.

== Death ==
At age 88, while attending a public hearing in Coconut Creek, and speaking against proposed toll increases, Manuel suffered a heart attack, collapsed, and was rushed to a hospital. He died soon thereafter, on August 13, 1987. He is buried in Evergreen Cemetery in Fort Lauderdale with his wife.
