= Florida State Road 716 =

State highway in Florida

State Road 716
- Port St. Lucie Boulevard

Route information
- Maintained by FDOT
- Length: 4.355 mi (7.009 km)

Major junctions
- West end: Florida's Turnpike in Port St. Lucie
- East end: US 1 in Port St. Lucie

Location
- Country: United States
- State: Florida
- Counties: St. Lucie

Highway system
- Florida State Highway System; Interstate; US; State; Former; Pre‑1945; Toll; Scenic
← SR 715	→ SR 717

State Road 716 (SR 716), locally known as Port St. Lucie Boulevard or "PSL" Boulevard, is a 4.355-mile-long (7.009 km) east–west route through Port St. Lucie, Florida, extending from its western terminus at an interchange with Florida's Turnpike (SR 91) to an intersection with U.S. Route 1 (US 1 or SR 5), its eastern terminus. The entire roadway, stretching from Indiantown at its western terminus in Martin County to its terminus 2 miles east of its intersection with US 1 in Port St. Lucie in St. Lucie County, currently carries three different designations - SR 716, CR 76A, and CR 726. The roadway east of US 1 and between CR 76A and SR 716 has no state or county designation.

== Route description ==
33 miles from the extreme southern beginning of the roadway in Indiantown, the State Road 716 designation begins as a 6-lane roadway at the west end of the overpass carrying the road over Florida's Turnpike and its corresponding exit/entrance ramps with Port St. Lucie Blvd (Exit 142) in Port St. Lucie But it roadway goes west to palm city at Martin Highway/ SR714 a state road the ends west by the Okeechobee County. line at SR 710 and east To U.S. 1 in Stuart, Florida then SR 716 ends in Indiantown at SR 710.Heading east, SR 716 is a mixed residential/commercial street throughout the entire length of the state road designation; the residences remain along the road from when the road was originally a 2-lane residential throughfare. At the middle, SR 716 crosses over a pair of bridges over Long Creek and the North Fork of the St. Lucie River (both waterways part of the North Fork St. Lucie River Aquatic Preserve), the only undeveloped section of the road and St.Lucie river goes through to Indiantown and ends on Lake Okeechobee.From here, Port St. Lucie Boulevard continues east through more residential/commercial development, where the SR 716 designation terminates at US 1. East of US 1, the road continues for 2 miles, undergoing 4 name changes along the way: SE Cane Slough Road, a 4-lane roadway (with a middle left turn lane, or "suicide lane") from US 1 to its intersection with SE Lennard Road, where it narrows to a 2-lane residential street for the remainder of its length; SE Mariposa Avenue; SE Hallahan Street; and finally SE Ibis Avenue, where the roadway ends at its intersection with SE Caladium Ave.today we still call it SR 716 when it goes through Indiantown.

== History ==
In the 1980s, the route of SR 716 was shown to extend westward from its current terminus at Florida's Turnpike to Interstate 95 (I-95), heading west and then south along Port St. Lucie Boulevard before turning westward along Gatlin Boulevard (formerly Savage Boulevard) towards I-95. Currently, that section is marked "active off the SHS" on the FDOT Straight Line Diagram for SR 716. As recently as 2000, a mileage sign on I-95 heading north after the interchange with Martin Highway (SR 714) listed "SR 716" as the next exit; it has since been covered over and now reads "Port St. Lucie." As late as 2006, many current editions of commercially-prepared road maps incorrectly show SR 716 with its original alignment west of the Turnpike, along Gatlin Boulevard west towards its interchange with I-95. Today, SR 716 signage can be found west of the interchange with the Turnpike.

In the early 2000s, an extension connecting the southern end of Port St. Lucie Boulevard at the Martin/St. Lucie County line to Martin Highway (SR 714) at the intersection of Citrus Boulevard (County Road 76A) was completed, providing western Port St. Lucie with a second connection into Martin County. Currently, the 11 mile stretch of Port St. Lucie/Citrus Boulevard between Florida's Turnpike in Port St. Lucie and (SR 714) in Martin County remains undesignated as either a state or county road.

== Future ==
Currently, the Florida Department of Transportation is in the process of widening Port St. Lucie Boulevard south of Darwin Boulevard to Alcantarra Boulevard from a 2 lane undivided roadway to a 4 lane divided highway. Mast arms will replace the current traffic signals at Darwin Boulevard and Tunis Avenue, while new mast arm signals will be installed at south Tulip Boulevard and Alcantarra Boulevard. The new signals at Tunis Avenue and Tulip Boulevard will be the first in St. Lucie County/Port St. Lucie to utilize two red lights at the top of the signals in order to provide a redundancy should one of the signal lights burn out.

== Major intersections ==
The entire route is in Port St. Lucie, St. Lucie County.

mi	km	Destinations	Notes
4.931	7.936	Florida's Turnpike / SR 91 / SE Bayshore Boulevard	Exit 142 on Florida's Turnpike (SR 91); road continues west and south into Martin County to SR 714/Martin Highway without state or county designation.
5.958	9.588	Airoso Boulevard (CR 615 north) – Fort Pierce	Former southern terminus of SR 615; CR 615 is unsigned through Port St. Lucie and becomes SR 615/25th street in Fort Pierce.
6.999	11.264	Long Creek	
7.150	11.507	North Fork, St. Lucie River	
9.271	14.920	US 1 / SR 5 / Cane Slough Road/Mariposa Avenue – Fort Pierce, Stuart	Easter terminus of SR 716/Port St. Lucie Blvd; road continues eastward without designation
1.000 mi = 1.609 km; 1.000 km = 0.621 mi: Tolled
