= Crosstown Parkway (Port St. Lucie) =

Thoroughfare in Port St. Lucie, Florida

Crosstown Parkway is a 10-mile (16 km), six-lane thoroughfare running east–west in Port St. Lucie, Florida. When complete, its western terminus will be with CR 609 (Range Line Road). Currently, the temporary western terminus is with Village Parkway in Tradition, approximately 2 miles west of Interstate 95 (I-95). Crosstown's eastern terminus is with US Highway 1 (US 1); however, the road continues beyond US 1 as Village Green Drive. The primary intent of the construction of this road was to ease congestion on the city's only other two east–west routes through the city: Prima Vista Boulevard / St. Lucie West Boulevard and the combined State Road 716 (Port St. Lucie Boulevard / Gatlin Boulevard) roadways.

== History ==
Throughout most of Port St. Lucie's history, there were only two primary east–west routes through the city, Port St. Lucie and Prima Vista boulevards. The need for a third east–west thoroughfare has been recognized since 1980. The Palmer Expressway, a Turnpike project, was proposed at that time, but was eventually removed from the active Turnpike projects list in 1997.

Construction on the extension to US 1, including a 4,000-foot (1,200 m) bridge over the North Fork of the St. Lucie River started in 2017, and the bridge was opened to the public with a party on September 28, 2019. At the intersection is a pair of towers, topped with sculptures of swimming fish and further decorated with tiles of wildlife in the St. Lucie River. Currently, there is a superstreet intersection at Floresta Drive, the first in Florida; recently, residents have been petitioning to change the superstreet intersection to one that is easier and less time-consuming to navigate.

One proposed project is a linear park under the Crosstown Bridge, to be called "The Plaza Under the Bridge", which will include lighting, irrigation, a proposed floating dock, a gazebo, and a coquina hardscape.

== Major intersections ==
The entire route is in Port St. Lucie, St. Lucie County.

mi	km	Destinations	Notes
0.000	0.000	Village Parkway	Current western terminus
1.31	2.11	I-95	Exit 120 on I-95; opened March 28, 2009
4.23	6.81	Florida's Turnpike	Proposed interchange
5.53	8.90	Airoso Boulevard (CR 615) – Fort Pierce	CR 615 is unsigned through Port St. Lucie and becomes SR 615/25th street in Fort Pierce.
7.43	11.96	North Fork, St. Lucie River	
8.23	13.24	US 1 / SR 5 / Village Green Drive – Fort Pierce, Stuart	Easter terminus of Crosstown Parkway
1.000 mi = 1.609 km; 1.000 km = 0.621 mi: Proposed
