= Florida State Road 76 =

State highway in Florida, United States

State Road 76
- Kanner Highway
- SR 76 highlighted in red

Route information
- Maintained by FDOT
- Length: 31.504 mi (50.701 km)
- Existed: 1945 renumbering–present

Major junctions
- West end: US 98 / US 441 at Port Mayaca
- SR 710 near Indiantown; I-95 near Stuart
- East end: US 1 in Stuart

Location
- Country: United States
- State: Florida
- Counties: Martin

Highway system
- Florida State Highway System; Interstate; US; State; Former; Pre‑1945; Toll; Scenic
← SR 75	→ SR 77

State Road 76 (SR 76), also known and signed as Kanner Highway, is a 31.504-mile-long (50.701 km) northeast-southwest (signed east–west) state highway connecting Port Mayaca on the shore of Lake Okeechobee at the intersection with US 98-441 (SR 700-SR 15) with Stuart on the shore of the St. Lucie River near the Atlantic Ocean and the Treasure Coast at an intersection with US 1 (SR 5). It parallels the nearby St. Lucie Canal, a navigable waterway connecting the lake and the ocean.

== Route description ==
West of Florida's Turnpike (SR 91) and Interstate 95 (SR 9), SR 76 crosses the woodland and wetlands typifying Florida northeast of Lake Okeechobee. With the exception of Indiantown on the opposite (northern) side of St. Lucie Canal near the intersection of SR 76 and SR 710, very little human habitation exists along the southwestern 25 miles (40 km) of SR 76. West of Indiantown, the John G. and Susan H. DuPuis Jr. Wildlife and Environmental Area follow the southern side of SR 76.

Northeast of the two expressways, the human presence is more pronounced (a marina is located on the canal between the turnpike and I-95, for example) as the urbanization undergone by Florida's extreme southeastern counties has penetrated Martin County.

== History ==
State Road 76 was formed by the former State Roads 85 and 109 in the 1945 renumbering. SR 76's routing has been unchanged since 1945.

== Major intersections ==
The entire route is in Martin County.

Location	mi	km	Destinations	Notes
Port Mayaca	0.000	0.000	US 98 / US 441 (Conners Highway) – Pahokee, Belle Glade, Okeechobee	Road is unsigned SR 700 / SR 15
	11.490	18.491	To SR 710 – Okeechobee, West Palm Beach, Indiantown	Grade-separated interchange
	20.934	33.690	CR 708 east (Bridge Road) to I-95 – Hobe Sound	Former western terminus of SR 708
	23.676	38.103	CR 711 south (Pratt Whitney Road) / CR 76A west (96th Street)	Former termini of SR 711 and SR 76A
	25.50	41.04	I-95 – Daytona Beach, West Palm Beach	Exit 101 on I-95 (SR 9)
	26.716	42.995	Salerno Road to US 1 – Indian River State College	Former western terminus of SR 722
Stuart	29.182	46.964	Martin Highway (CR 714 west) – Airport	Former SR 714
Stuart	30.442	48.992	SR 714 (Monterey Road) to Florida's Turnpike	
Stuart	31.504	50.701	US 1 (Federal Highway) / Colorado Avenue north – Courthouse Cultural Center	US 1 is unsigned SR 5; continues north without designation
1.000 mi = 1.609 km; 1.000 km = 0.621 mi

== Related routes ==
=== County Road 76A ===
Until the mid-1990s, Florida Department of Transportation had State Road 76A signs along Pratt Whitney Road west of SR 76 in Tropical Park and Southwest 48th Street south of Martin Highway (SR 714) near Palm City (an eastward continuation of Pratt Whitney Road is the former SR 711, now County Road 711).

After FDOT removed its State Road signs from the alternate route, new County Road 76A signs lined the rural streets in their place. The County Road 76A designation still applies to the former SR 76A.

=== County Road 722 ===
At the same time that SR 76A signs were erected, Salerno Road between SR 76 and Dixie Highway (County Road A1A) in Port Salerno sported State Road 722 signs. Like SR 76A to the west, Salerno Road lost its FDOT State Road designation and became County Road 722 in the mid-1990s; unlike the former SR 76A, the former SR 722 is not primarily a rural route, but a road making a direct connection between SR 76 and US 1 (East Federal Highway) in Coral Gardens, thus giving motorists an opportunity to shorten their drive from SR 76 to US 1 by ten miles. Recently, the urbanization that is now occurring on the northeastern end of SR 76 is also occurring along the eastern half of CR 722 as construction of new residential developments continues.
