= Capt. Henry E. Sewall House =

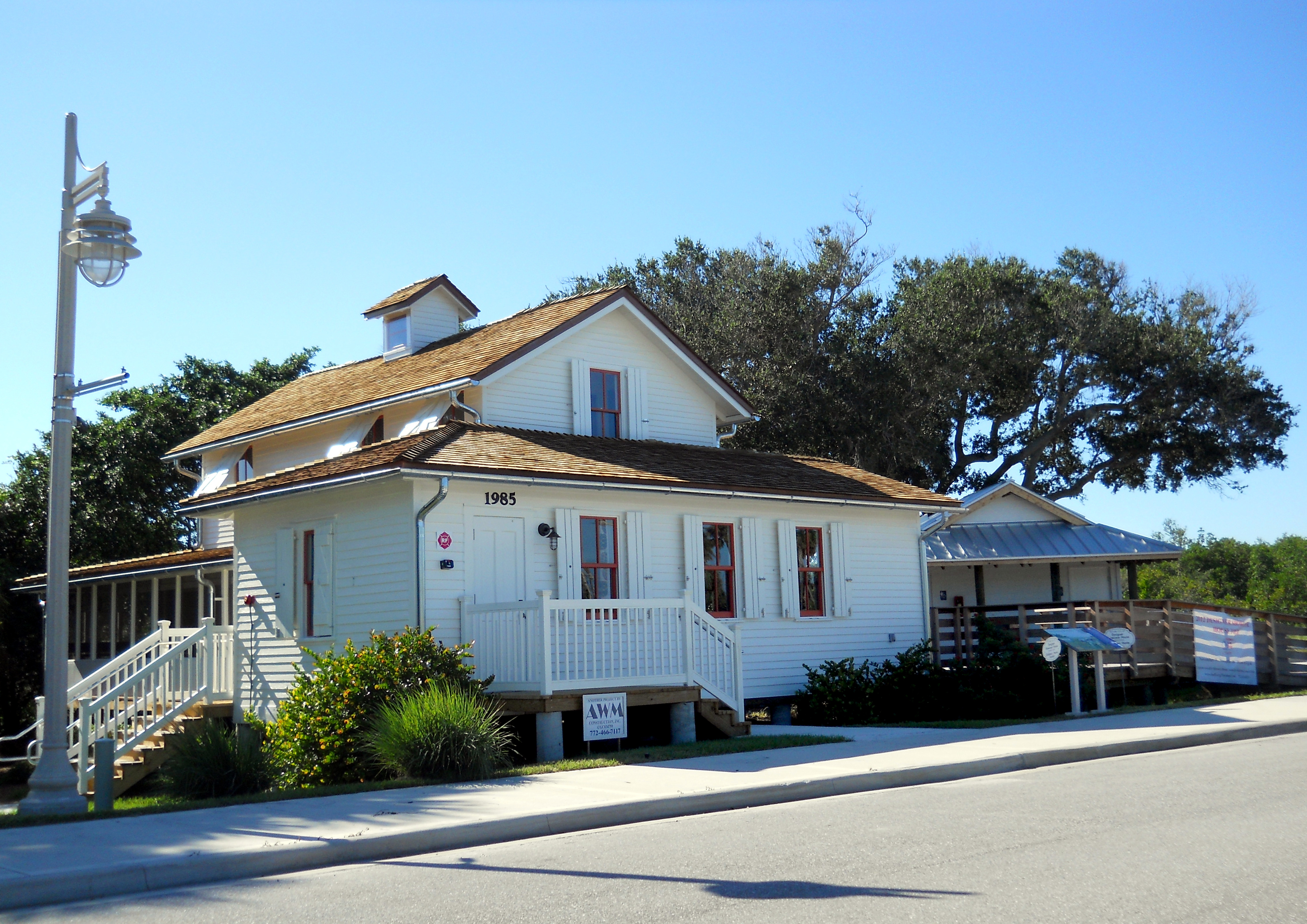
- Interactive map of the Capt. Henry E. Sewall House area

General information
- Architectural style: Florida Cracker Vernacular
- Location: Jensen Beach, Florida, United States
- Coordinates: 27°13′42.2″N 80°12′51.8″W
- Construction started: 1889
- Completed: 1889
- Client: himself

Technical details
- Structural system: wooden frame

Design and construction
- Architect: Capt. Henry E. Sewall

The Capt. Henry E. Sewall House is an historic wooden house now located in Indian RiverSide Park in Jensen Beach, in Martin County, Florida. Local pioneer and developer Capt. Henry E. Sewall built it in 1889 at the southern tip of Sewall's Point, the peninsula and town which bear his family name. When Capt. Sewall became the postmaster of Sewall's Point, the house served also as the Sewall's Point post office. Next to the house Capt. Sewall also built a freight dock that extended into the St. Lucie River along with a storage building at its end.

In 1910, Capt Sewall and his wife Abbie (Evans) Sewall built a larger house higher up on the property and in 1913 the 1889 house was moved by barge across the St. Lucie River to a waterfront lot on what is now Old St. Lucie Boulevard in Port Sewall (now part of Stuart), where it stood until being moved by barge to Indian RiverSide Park in 2007. During its stay in Port Sewall the present small rectangular cupola was added to the roof of the house. During Prohibition, green or red lanterns were hung in the cupola to signal incoming bootleggers whether it was safe or not for them to offload their cargoes of alcohol.

In 2008 the building was moved to its permanent location within Indian Riverside Park. In November 2012 the restored building was opened to the public.

In 2012 the building was designated a Martin County Historic Property.
