= List of county roads in Broward County, Florida =

- County road shields used in Florida

Highway names
- Interstates: Interstate X (I-X)
- US Highways: U.S. Highway X (US X)
- State: State Road X (SR X)
- County: County Road X (CR-X)

System links
- County roads in Florida; County roads in Broward County

The following is a list of county roads in Broward County, Florida. All county roads are maintained by the county in which they reside, although not all routes are marked with standard county road shields. County roads are maintained by Broward Public Works.

== County Road 5A ==
County Road 5A
- Location: Hallandale Beach–Dania Beach
- Length: 4.9 mi (7.9 km)

County Road 5A is the unsigned designation along Dixie Highway in Hallandale Beach, Hollywood, and Dania Beach.

=== Route description ===
CR 5A begins at NE 215th Street on the Broward/Miami-Dade County line in Hallandale Beach. From here, CR 5A heads north with northbound lanes running along SE First Avenue and southbound lanes running along Dixie Highway. The northbound and southbound lanes run beside each other with the Florida East Coast Railway running between them for most of its route. It continues north through Hallandale Beach and Hollywood. In Dania Beach, northbound traffic crosses the Florida East Coast Railway at Sheridan Street (SR 822) and both north and soundbound lanes reconnect on Dixie Highway. Dixie Highway then turns northeast away from the railroad corridor. CR 5A then comes to its northern terminus at U.S. Highway 1 (US 1) in Dania Beach.

=== History ===
The road was originally part of the historic Dixie Highway which came into existence in the early 1900s. The Dixie Highway would be the main north-south road through the area until it was replaced by U.S. Route 1 (US 1) a few blocks to the east in the 1920s. The road would also be designated as State Road 173 (SR 173) until the 1945 Florida State Road renumbering. After that, it became SR 5A, an auxiliary route to US 1 (which carries the hidden designation SR 5). The route was turned over to county control in the 1990s.

=== Major junctions ===
| Location | mi | km | Destinations | Notes |
|---|---|---|---|---|
| Hallandale Beach | 0.0 | 0.0 | NE 215th Street | continues from Miami-Dade County |
| Hallandale Beach | 0.8 | 1.3 | SR 858 (Hallandale Beach Boulevard) | |
| Hallandale Beach–Hollywood line | 1.5 | 2.4 | SR 824 west (Pembroke Road) | Eastern terminus of SR 824 |
| Hollywood | 2.6 | 4.2 | SR 820 (Hollywood Boulevard) | |
| Hollywood–Dania Beach line | 4.1 | 6.6 | SR 822 (Sheridan Street) | |
| Dania Beach | 4.9 | 7.9 | US 1 | |
1.000 mi = 1.609 km; 1.000 km = 0.621 mi

== County Road 811 ==
County Road 811
- Location: Deerfield Beach
- Length: 0.4 mi (640 m)

County Road 811 is the 0.5-mile northern extension of State Road 811 in Deerfield Beach.

== County Road 811A ==
County Road 811A
- Location: Fort Lauderdale–Pompano Beach
- Length: 6.9 mi (11.1 km)

County Road 811A is Andrews Avenue through Downtown Fort Lauderdale north to Pompano Beach.

== County Road 814 ==
County Road 814
- Location: Coral Springs
- Length: 5.9 mi (9.5 km)

County Road 814 is the westernmost 6 miles of Atlantic Boulevard in Coral Springs.

== County Road 816 ==
County Road 816
- Location: Sunrise
- Length: 3.9 mi (6.3 km)

County Road 816 is the westernmost 4 miles of Oakland Park Boulevard in Sunrise.

== County Road 818 ==
County Road 818
- Location: Pembroke Pines
- Length: 7.5 mi (12.1 km)

County Road 818 is the westernmost 7.5 miles of Griffin Road near Pembroke Pines.

== County Road 822 ==
County Road 822
- Location: Pembroke Pines–Hollywood
- Length: 11.6 mi (18.7 km)

County Road 818 is a nearly 12 mile segment of Sheridan Street in Pembroke Pines and Hollywood.

== County Road 823 ==
County Road 823
- Location: Plantation–Sunrise
- Length: 3.7 mi (6.0 km)

County Road 823 is a nearly 4 mile northern segment of Flamingo Road north of Interstate 595 in Plantation and Sunrise.

== County Road 827 ==
County Road 827
- Location: Parkland
- Length: 6.2 mi (10.0 km)

County Road 827 is the former designation for Loxahatchee Road on the north side of Parkland. Loxahatchee Road begins at US 441 in Parkland and runs northwest along the Hillsboro Canal before terminating at Loxahatchee National Wildlife Refuge. Previously a segment of State Road 827, it became CR 827 in 1990 when it was transferred to county control. It has since come under control of the city of Parkland and is no longer classified on maps as CR 827.

== County Road 833 ==
County Road 833
- Location: Miccosukee Indian Reservation
- Length: 10.1 mi (16.3 km)

County Road 833 is Snake Road in the Miccosukee Indian Reservation in western Broward County.

== County Road 834 ==
County Road 834
- Location: Coral Springs
- Length: 2.9 mi (4.7 km)

County Road 834 is the county-controlled segment of Sample Road in Coral Springs.

== County Road 838 ==
County Road 838
- Location: Sunrise–Plantation
- Length: 5.4 mi (8.7 km)

County Road 838 is the county-controlled segment of Sunrise Boulevard in Sunrise and Plantation.

== County Road 840 ==
County Road 840
- Location: Tamarac–Oakland Park
- Length: 7.6 mi (12.2 km)

County Road 840 is the unsigned designation for West McNab Road, NW 62nd Street, and Cypress Creek Road, which runs from Tamarac to Oakland Park.

=== Route description ===
CR 840 begins in Tamarac at an intersection with SR 817 (University Drive). From here, it is known as West McNab Road and it heads east through North Lauderdale. On the east side of North Lauderdale, West McNab Road turns southeast and crosses US 441 and Florida's Turnpike on separate overpasses. Ramps between the two overpasses connect the road to US 441. Once over the Turnpike, CR 840 enters Fort Lauderdale and becomes NW 62nd Street. Less than a mile later, CR 840 intersects NW 31st Avenue and it becomes Cypress Creek Road. Cypress Creek Road continues east along the north side of Fort Lauderdale Executive Airport before coming to an intersection with SR 845 (Powerline Road). It then crosses the South Florida Rail Corridor (Tri-Rail line) just north of Cypress Creek station before coming to an intersection with Andrews Avenue (CR 811A). CR 840 then has an interchange with Interstate 95 before terminating at Dixie Highway (SR 811) between Oakland Park and Pompano Beach.

At the western terminus, West McNab Road continues west as a residential street. At the eastern terminus, the road continues east as NE 62nd Street, a residential street.

=== History ===
Part of the route was previously SR 840. The route of CR 840 was planned to be part Cypress Creek Expressway in the 1970s but it was never built due to funding and opposition. In 1983, Cypress Creek Road was extended west over Florida's Turnpike and US 441 to West McNab Road.

=== Major intersections ===
| Location | mi | km | Destinations | Notes |
|---|---|---|---|---|
| Tamarac | 0.0 | 0.0 | SR 817 (University Drive) | Road continues westward without designation |
| North Lauderdale | 2.7 | 4.3 | To US 441 / SR 7 | |
| Fort Lauderdale | 5.1 | 8.2 | SR 845 (Powerline Road) | |
| Fort Lauderdale | 5.6 | 9.0 | CR 811A (Andrews Avenue) | |
| Oakland Park | 5.8 | 9.3 | I-95 – West Palm Beach, Miami | Exit 33 on I-95 |
| Oakland Park | 6.0 | 9.7 | SR 811 (Dixie Highway) | Road continues eastward without designation |
1.000 mi = 1.609 km; 1.000 km = 0.621 mi

== County Road 848 ==
County Road 848
- Location: Davie–Cooper City
- Length: 6.8 mi (10.9 km)

County Road 848 is the unsigned county-controlled segments of Stirling Road in Davie and Cooper City. The route is city controlled within Southwest Ranches and Cooper City.

== County Road 858 ==
County Road 858
- Location: Miramar
- Length: 9.6 mi (15.4 km)

County Road 858 is the county-controlled segment of Miramar Parkway in Miramar.

== County Road 870 ==
County Road 870
- Location: Sunrise–Lauderhill
- Length: 2.7 mi (4.3 km)

County Road 870 is the county-controlled segment of Commercial Boulevard in Sunrise and Lauderhill.

== County Road 912 ==
County Road 912
- Location: Margate–Coconut Creek–Pompano Beach
- Length: 2.3 mi (3.7 km)

County Road 912 is Coconut Creek Parkway and a short segment of Dr. Martin Luther King Boulevard running from Margate through Coconut Creek to the west edge of Pompano Beach.

=== Route description ===
Coconut Creek Parkway begins in Margate at US 441. From here, it heads east through Coconut Creek. Two miles later, Coconut Creek Parkway comes to an interchange with Florida's Turnpike. At the intersection with SR 849 (NW 31st Avenue), which is across from the Turnpike interchange ramps, CR 912 briefly becomes Dr. Martin Luther King Boulevard. CR 912 terminates just beyond the SR 849/Turnpike intersection at Blount Road, where county maintenance ends. Dr. Martin Luther King Boulevard continues east as a city street from here to SR 811 in Pompano Beach.

=== History ===
From 1945 until the early 1970s, Coconut Creek Parkway and Dr. Martin Luther King Boulevard (both known then as Hammondville Road) were part of SR 814, which also continued eastward to State Road A1A on Atlantic Boulevard after a short zigzag involving North Dixie Highway (SR 811). In the early 1970s, SR 814 between Florida's Turnpike and Dixie Highway was rerouted along NW 31st Avenue south to Atlantic Boulevard east. In 1983, Atlantic Boulevard was extended west of NW 31st Avenue and SR 814 was rerouted onto the new segment of Atlantic Boulevard. The north–south section along NW 31 Avenue was redesignated State Road 849 by Florida Department of Transportation, and Hammondville Road became Coconut Creek Parkway and was redesignated SR 912. Around the year 2000, SR 912 was relinquished to Broward County control and converted to CR 912.

=== Major intersections ===
| Location | mi | km | Destinations | Notes |
|---|---|---|---|---|
| Margate | 0.0 | 0.0 | US 441 (SR 7) | Western terminus of CR 912 |
| | 2.2 | 3.5 | NW 31st Avenue (SR 849 south) | Located at same intersection as Turnpike Ramp |
| | 2.2 | 3.5 | Florida's Turnpike – Miami, Orlando | Exit 67 on Turnpike |
| Pompano Beach | 2.3 | 3.7 | Blount Road | Eastern terminus of CR 912 |
| Pompano Beach | 5.0 | 8.0 | SR 811 (Dixie Highway) | |
1.000 mi = 1.609 km; 1.000 km = 0.621 mi: Tolled; Route transition
