= Florida State Road 715 =

State highway in Florida, United States

State Road 715

Route information
- Maintained by FDOT
- Length: 12.072 mi (19.428 km)

Major junctions
- South end: SR 80 in Belle Glade
- North end: US 98 / US 441 in Pahokee

Location
- Country: United States
- State: Florida
- Counties: Palm Beach

Highway system
- Florida State Highway System; Interstate; US; State; Former; Pre‑1945; Toll; Scenic
← SR 714	→ SR 716

State Road 715 (SR 715) is a 12-mile-long (19 km) north–south route serving two cities on and near the southeastern shore of Lake Okeechobee in southern Florida. It is known locally as Southwest 16th Street, Northwest 16th Street, and Bacom Point Road, The southern terminus is an intersection with Palm Beach Road (SR 80) in Palm Beach County just south of Belle Glade; the northern terminus is an intersection with Lake Avenue (U.S. Route 441 or US 441/SR 15) in downtown Pahokee.

== Route description ==
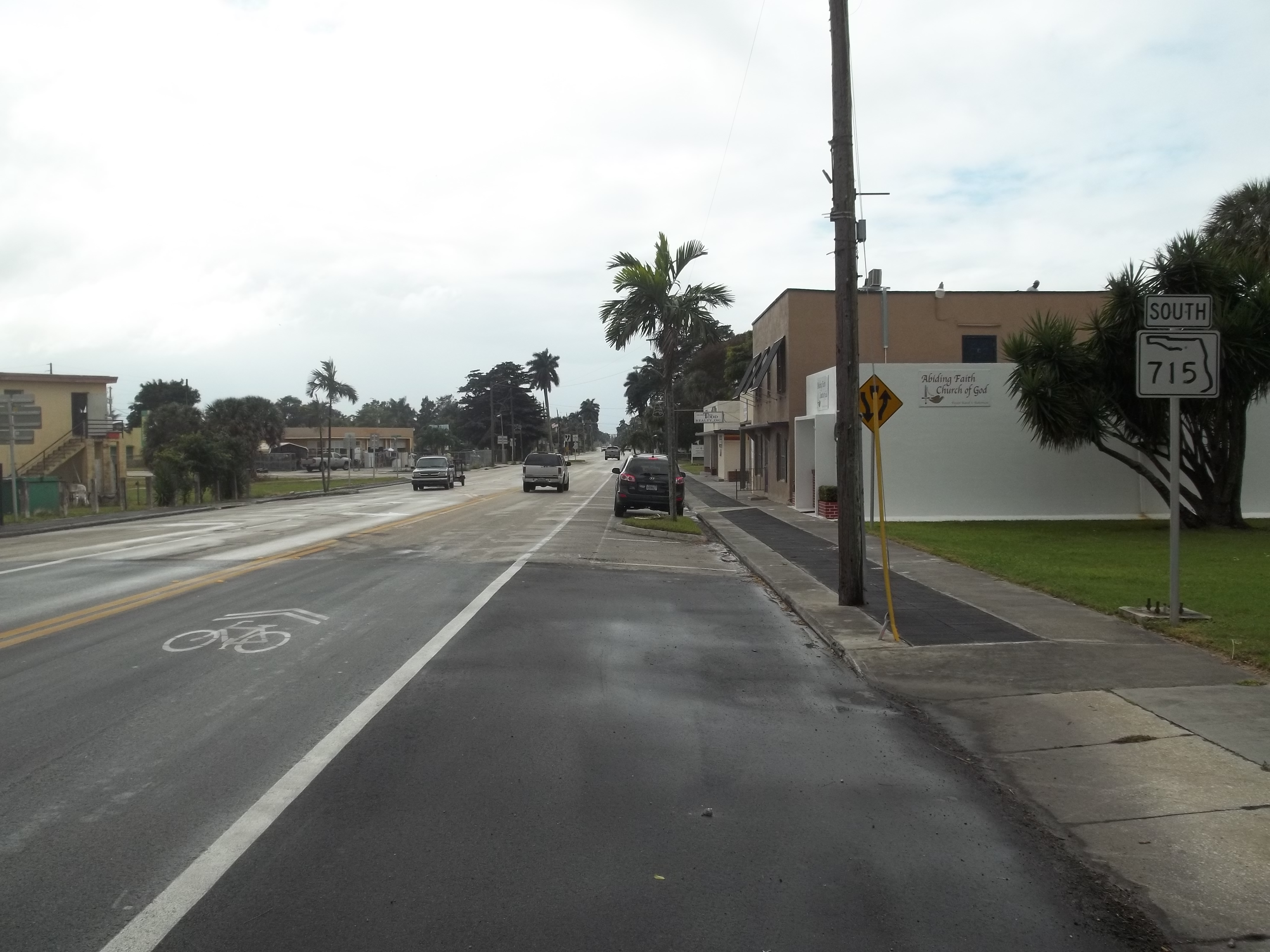
SR 715 in Pahokee, looking south from the US 441/98 intersection

State Road 715 begins at the intersection with State Road 80 at the western city limits of Belle Glade. Heading north, SR 715 skirts the western border of the town, passing through parks and a Palm Beach State College campus before heading into a mix of residential and commercial areas. It then intersects State Road 717 at the Hillsboro Canal near the northwestern end of Belle Glade. State Road 715 then leaves Belle Glade into farmland and towards the lake, with the sparse house or business on the side of the road. Following the intersection with Old Vandergrift Road, State Road 715 runs parallel with the Rim Canal for the next several miles, save a small section where it veers inland as it passes just east of Palm Beach County Glades Airport. North of the Airport, the road veers northeast, with houses lining the road to the west and farmland mostly to the east, slowly heading into Pahokee and terminating at US 98/US 441/SR 15, near the Pahokee City Hall. The road continues east onto East First Street which leads to South Barfield Highway, and ends at a local street named South Greenstar Avenue.

== Major intersections ==
The entire route is in Palm Beach County.

Location	mi	km	Destinations	Notes
Belle Glade	0.000	0.000	SR 80 (South Main Street) – South Bay	Truck bypass route
Belle Glade	2.141	3.446	SR 717 south / CR 717 north (West Canal Street North)	Termini of SR 717 and CR 717
	4.308	6.933	SR 812 east (Hooker Highway) to US 441 / US 98 / SR 15 / SR 80 – Canal Point, West Palm Beach	Truck bypass route
Pahokee	12.072	19.428	US 98 / US 441 / SR 15 (Lake Avenue)	
1.000 mi = 1.609 km; 1.000 km = 0.621 mi
