= North Fork St. Lucie River Aquatic Preserve =

Coordinates: 27°16′54″N 80°19′4″W

The North Fork St. Lucie River Aquatic Preserve (NFSLR) is a freshwater and brackish water system connected to St. Lucie Estuary in Florida. It was designated as an aquatic preserve in 1972.

The NFSLR is part of Florida's "Save Our Rivers" Program, and is designated as an Outstanding Florida Water (pursuant to Chapter 62-302 F.A.C.).

== Environment ==
The NFSLR contains many federal and state protected species, including American alligators, manatees, North American river otters, nesting wood storks, little blue herons, brown pelicans, snook and opossum pipefish. The NFSLR also contains rare tropical peripheral fish species, including gobies, sleepers, and pipefish.

== Endangered species ==
According to the Florida Department of Environmental Protection, 33 listed species (11 plants, 2 fish, 5 reptiles, 13 birds, and 2 mammals) and three commercially exploited plant species have been documented in and adjacent to the preserve.

These species include:

- West Indian manatee
- Wood stork
- Sandhill crane
- Yellow-billed cuckoo
- Piping plover
- Bald eagle
- American alligator
- Eastern indigo snake
- Mangrove rivulus
- Opossum pipefish

== Management ==
In 1984, the North Fork-St. Lucie River Aquatic Reserve Management Plan was adopted by Department of Natural Resources, Division of Recreation and Parks, Bureau of Environmental Land Management to provide a fundamental policy guideline for management of the NFSLR.

== Commercial ==
NFSLR provides a critical habitat for juvenile species, including blue crabs, snook, snapper, drum and shrimp.
