= Florida State Road 812 =

State highway in Florida, United States

State Road 812
- Hooker Highway

Route information
- Maintained by FDOT
- Length: 1.054 mi (1.696 km)
- Existed: 2008–present

Major junctions
- West end: SR 715 near Belle Glade
- East end: US 98 / US 441 / SR 80 near Belle Glade

Location
- Country: United States
- State: Florida
- Counties: Palm Beach

Highway system
- Florida State Highway System; Interstate; US; State; Former; Pre‑1945; Toll; Scenic
← SR 811	→ SR 814

State Road 812 (SR 812) is a short west–east state highway located north of Belle Glade, Palm Beach County, Florida. Known as Hooker Highway, it forms a portion of a truck bypass around Belle Glade. It connects with SR 715 at its western terminus and with US 98, US 441, SR 15, and SR 80 at its eastern terminus. The highway is a two-lane road and was named in honor of Walter R. Hooker.

== Route description ==
Hooker Highway's western terminus is at SR 715. The road travels mostly through rural farmland, especially to its north. To its south is a Palm Beach County water treatment facility and the Lakeland Medical Center, which is farther east. As the highway approaches its eastern terminus, it passes Livestock Market Road and a railroad crossing before concluding at an intersection with US 98, US 441, SR 15, and SR 80.

== History ==
Hooker Highway is named after Walter R. Hooker, a farmer and businessman who moved to the Everglades in 1920 and was a member of the Palm Beach County Planning and Zoning Board. The road was named after him at the request of Commissioner Paul Rardin, who was a county commissioner between the mid-1940s and the mid-1960s.

Hooker Highway is a two-lane road, though a proposal had been made in 1969 to expand it to four as part of a seven-point road improvement program. In 2008, Palm Beach County transferred the road to the Florida Department of Transportation to create a truck bypass, which also uses SR 715 south of SR 812. A similar proposal had been made in 1988 for SR 715 and Hooker Highway to be used as a truck bypass.

== Major intersections ==
The entire route is in Belle Glade, Palm Beach County.

mi	km	Destinations	Notes
0.000	0.000	SR 715 to SR 80 / US 27	Western terminus
1.054	1.696	US 98 / US 441 / SR 15 / SR 80	Eastern terminus
1.000 mi = 1.609 km; 1.000 km = 0.621 mi
