= Sewall's Point, Florida =

Town in the state of Florida, United States

- Town
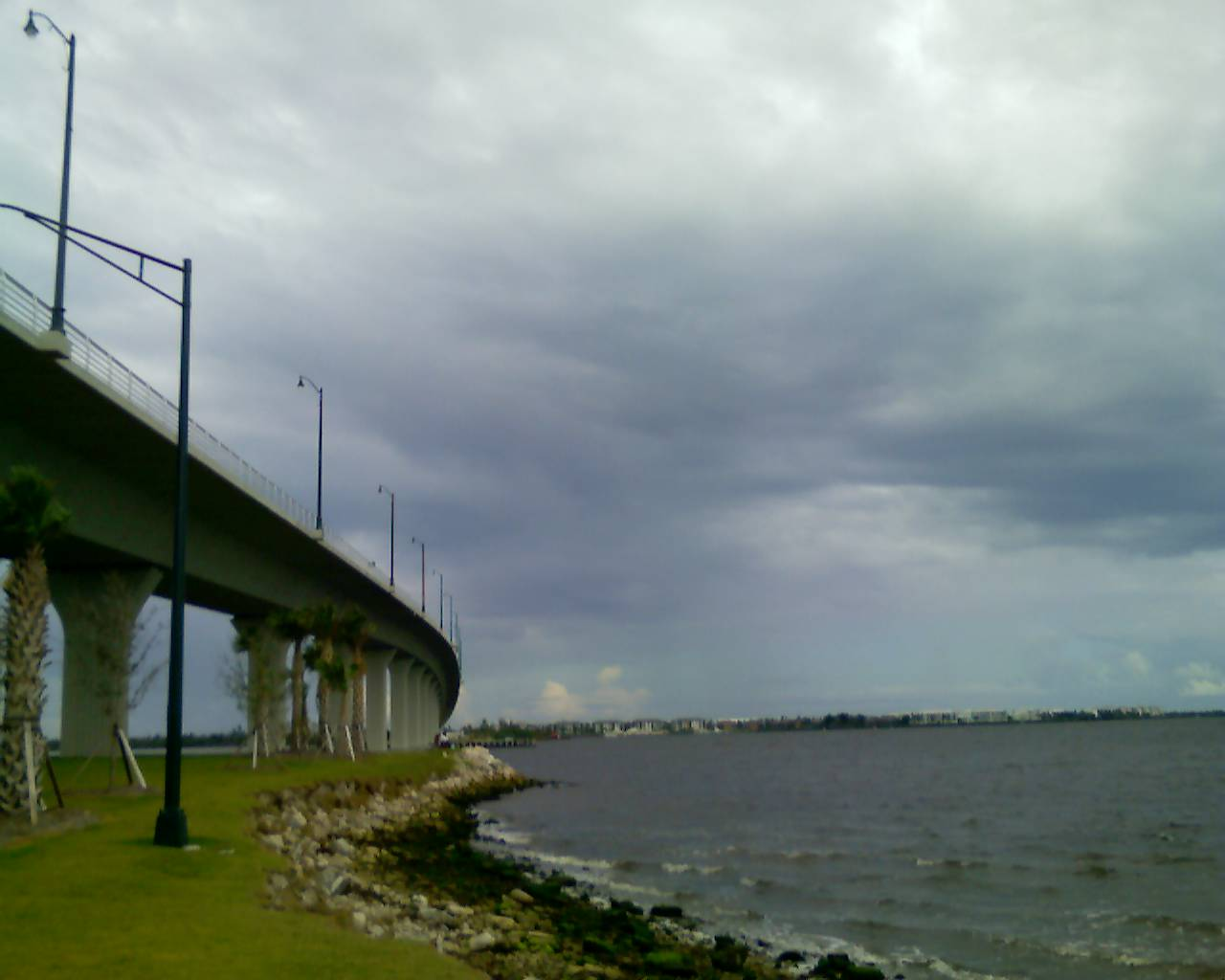
- The new Ernest Lyons Bridge, which carries State Road A1A from Hutchinson Island to Sewall's Point

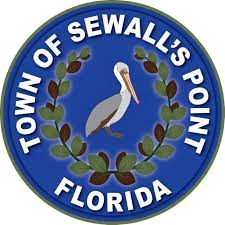
- Seal
- Motto: "A Great Place to Live"
- Location in Martin County and the state of Florida
- Coordinates: 27°11′49″N 80°11′54″W
- Country: United States
- State: Florida
- County: Martin
- Settled: 1889
- Platted: 1891-1893
- Incorporated: June 12, 1957

Government
  - Type: Commission–Manager
  - Mayor: Vincent "Vinny" N. Barile
  - Vice Mayor: Kaija Mayfield
  - Commissioners: Frank Fender, Frank Tidikis, and Dave Kurzman
  - Town Manager: Robert J. Daniels
  - Town Attorney: Glen J. Torcivia

Area
  - Total: 4.13 sq mi (10.70 km^{2})
  - Land: 1.18 sq mi (3.05 km^{2})
  - Water: 2.95 sq mi (7.65 km^{2})
- Elevation: 7 ft (2.1 m)

Population (2020)
  - Total: 1,991
  - Density: 1,690.3/sq mi (652.62/km^{2})
- Time zone: UTC-5 (Eastern (EST))
  - Summer (DST): UTC-4 (EDT)
- ZIP code: 34996
- Area code: 772
- FIPS code: 12-65225
- GNIS feature ID: 2407316
- Website: sewallspoint.org

Sewall's Point is a town located on the peninsula of the same name in Martin County, Florida, United States. The population was 1,991 at the 2020 census. It is an eastern suburb of Stuart, which is the county seat of Martin County.

== History ==
Both Sewall's Point and the peninsula are named for Captain Henry Edwin Sewall. On September 26, 2004, Hurricane Jeanne made landfall on Hutchinson Island, just east of Sewall's Point, exactly three weeks after Hurricane Frances did so at the same location.

== Geography ==
Occupying a peninsula, it is bordered by water on the south, east, and west. On the south and west is the St. Lucie River and to the east is the Indian River Lagoon. On the north it is bordered by unincorporated Jensen Beach.

According to the United States Census Bureau, the town has a total area of 4.1 square miles (11 km^{2}), of which 1.2 square miles (3.1 km^{2}) are land and 2.9 square miles (7.5 km^{2}), or 71.48%, are water.

=== Climate ===
The Town of Sewall's Point has a tropical climate, similar to the climate found in much of the Caribbean. It is part of the only region in the 48 contiguous states that falls under that category. More specifically, it generally has a tropical savanna climate (Köppen climate classification: Aw), bordering a tropical monsoon climate (Köppen climate classification: Am).

== Demographics ==
Historical population
Census	Pop.	Note	%±
1960	151		—
1970	298		97.4%
1980	1,187		298.3%
1990	1,588		33.8%
2000	1,946		22.5%
2010	1,996		2.6%
2020	1,991		−0.3%
U.S. Decennial Census

=== Racial and ethnic composition ===
Sewall's Point racial composition (Hispanics excluded from racial categories) (NH = Non-Hispanic)
Race	Pop 2010	Pop 2020	% 2010	% 2020
White (NH)	1,893	1,762	94.84%	88.50%
Black or African American (NH)	11	15	0.55%	0.75%
Native American or Alaska Native (NH)	0	3	0.00%	0.15%
Asian (NH)	19	36	0.95%	1.81%
Pacific Islander or Native Hawaiian (NH)	1	0	0.05%	0.00%
Some other race (NH)	1	2	0.05%	0.10%
Two or more races/Multiracial (NH)	10	55	0.50%	2.76%
Hispanic or Latino (any race)	61	118	3.06%	5.93%
Total	1,996	1,991	100.00%	100.00%

=== 2020 census ===
As of the 2020 census, Sewall's Point had a population of 1,991. The median age was 56.9 years. 15.3% of residents were under the age of 18 and 32.3% were 65 years of age or older. For every 100 females, there were 100.3 males, and for every 100 females age 18 and over there were 99.8 males age 18 and over.

100.0% of residents lived in urban areas, while 0.0% lived in rural areas.

There were 832 households in Sewall's Point, of which 24.0% had children under the age of 18 living in them. Of all households, 69.5% were married-couple households, 10.2% were households with a male householder and no spouse or partner present, and 15.5% were households with a female householder and no spouse or partner present. About 18.1% of all households were made up of individuals, and 10.7% had someone living alone who was 65 years of age or older.

There were 931 housing units, of which 10.6% were vacant. The homeowner vacancy rate was 3.5% and the rental vacancy rate was 2.5%.

According to the 2020 American Community Survey 5-year estimates, there were 588 families residing in the town.

=== 2010 census ===
As of the 2010 United States census, there were 1,996 people, 739 households, and 576 families residing in the town.

=== 2000 census ===
As of the census of 2000, there were 1,946 people, 758 households, and 607 families residing in the town. The population density was 1,578.1 inhabitants per square mile (609.3/km^{2}). There were 828 housing units at an average density of 671.5 per square mile (259.3/km^{2}). The racial makeup of the town was 98.72% White, 0.41% African American, 0.41% Asian, 0.10% from other races, and 0.36% from two or more races. Hispanic or Latino of any race were 1.39% of the population.

In 2000, there were 758 households, out of which 33.4% had children under the age of 18 living with them, 73.4% were married couples living together, 4.4% had a female householder with no husband present, and 19.8% were non-families. 15.3% of all households were made up of individuals, and 6.5% had someone living alone who was 65 years of age or older. The average household size was 2.57 and the average family size was 2.85.

In 2000, in the town, the population was spread out, with 24.6% under the age of 18, 2.9% from 18 to 24, 19.9% from 25 to 44, 33.0% from 45 to 64, and 19.7% who were 65 years of age or older. The median age was 47 years. For every 100 females, there were 98.4 males. For every 100 females age 18 and over, there were 96.8 males.

In 2000, the median income for a household in the town was $97,517, and the median income for a family was $104,893. Males had a median income of $82,748 versus $32,500 for females. The per capita income for the town was $55,121. About 4.6% of families and 4.3% of the population were below the poverty line, including 5.5% of those under age 18 and 3.8% of those age 65 or over.

== Notable people ==
- James F. Hutchinson, fine arts painter since 1948, Florida Hall of Fame, home/studio in Sewall's Point
- Vaughn Monroe, baritone singer, trumpeter and big band leader and actor, lived in Sewall's Point
- 1st Lieutenant Francis Tyndall, USAAC, World War I fighter pilot, Silver Star recipient, and namesake of Tyndall Air Force Base, Florida

== See also ==
- Capt. Henry E. Sewall House, built at the tip of Sewall's Point in 1889, moved in 1910 to Port Sewall (current day Stuart), and now located at Indian RiverSide Park, in Jensen Beach.
