= Florida's Turnpike =

Highway in Florida, United States

Florida's Turnpike
- State Road 91; Ronald Reagan Turnpike; Sunshine State Parkway (formerly)
- Florida's Turnpike highlighted in red

Route information
- Maintained by Florida's Turnpike Enterprise
- Length: 264.666 mi (425.939 km) 308.757 mi (496.896 km) including Homestead Extension
- Existed: January 25, 1957–present
- Component highways: SR 91 (unsigned) entire length

Major junctions
- South end: I-95 / US 441 / SR 9 / SR 826 in Miami Gardens
- Florida's Turnpike Extension in Miramar; I-595 / US 441 / SR 84 in Davie; SR 869 in Coconut Creek; US 98 / SR 80 near West Palm Beach; SR 417 in Orlando; US 17 / US 92 / US 441 / SR 528 in Orlando; I-4 in Orlando; SR 408 in Gotha; SR 429 in Ocoee; US 27 / SR 19 in Groveland
- North end: I-75 near Wildwood

Location
- Country: United States
- State: Florida
- Counties: Miami-Dade, Broward, Palm Beach, Martin, St. Lucie, Indian River, Okeechobee, Osceola, Orange, Lake, Sumter

Highway system
- Florida State Highway System; Interstate; US; State; Former; Pre‑1945; Toll; Scenic
← SR 90	SR 91	→ US 92

Florida's Turnpike, designated as unsigned State Road 91 (SR 91), is a controlled-access toll road in the U.S. state of Florida, maintained by Florida's Turnpike Enterprise (FTE). Spanning approximately 309 miles (497 km) along a northwest–southeast axis, the turnpike is in two sections. The SR 91 mainline runs roughly 265 miles (426 km) from its southern terminus at an interchange with Interstate 95 (I-95) in Miami Gardens to an interchange with I-75 in Wildwood at its northern terminus. The Homestead Extension of Florida's Turnpike (abbreviated HEFT and designated as unsigned SR 821) continues from the southern end of the mainline for another 48 miles (77 km) to US Highway 1 (US 1) in Florida City. The slogan for the road is "The Less Stressway". The mainline opened in stages between 1957 and 1964, while the extension was completed in 1974. The turnpike runs through Miami, Fort Lauderdale, and West Palm Beach, where it parallels I-95, and through Orlando, where it crosses I-4.

== Route description ==
=== Miami to Fort Pierce ===
The main section of Florida's Turnpike begins at the northern end of the Golden Glades Interchange in Miami Gardens as a six-lane highway, and passes through the Golden Glades Toll Barrier, a cashless toll point, similar to the ones on the HEFT. About 2 miles (3 km) north of the toll gantry, it passes by Hard Rock Stadium, home to the Miami Dolphins of the National Football League, to the west before intersecting with the northern end of the HEFT at the Miami-Dade/Broward County line 4 miles (6 km) from Golden Glades, continuing the HEFT's mile marker. The highway goes through the inland suburbs of Miramar, Hollywood, and Davie, with an exit at Hollywood Boulevard (SR 820) at mile 50, and passing west of the Seminole Hard Rock Hotel & Casino Hollywood just south the Griffin Road (SR 818) interchange (exit 53). In Davie, about 8 miles (13 km) north of the Homestead Extension interchange, it intersects with I-595, providing direct access to Alligator Alley and Ft. Lauderdale International Airport. The interchange has the highway gain two lanes but those lanes are lost during the next three interchanges. After two more interchanges, one with Sunrise Boulevard (SR 838) in Plantation and Commercial Boulevard (SR 870) in Tamarac, it crosses the Cypress Creek Toll Plaza in North Lauderdale, the second on the mainline. Just 1 mile (1.6 km) north of the toll plaza, it intersects with the Pompano Beach Service Plaza, the first of seven full-service plazas on the mainline, and where the Turnpike's operations center is located. Still in Pompano Beach, it has a northbound-only exit (and southbound-only entrance) at Atlantic Boulevard (SR 814), followed by full interchanges with Coconut Creek Parkway/Dr. Martin Luther King Jr. Boulevard (County Road 912) (exit 67) and Sample Road (SR 834) (exit 69). North of exit 69, the road is no longer illuminated by streetlights but rather only at interchanges, near service plazas, and some urban areas (like near Orlando). It then enters Deerfield Beach with an interchange with the Sawgrass Expressway in Coconut Creek (exit 71), the final interchange in Broward County. The Turnpike then enters Palm Beach County, with one interchange each in Boca Raton (Glades Road, exit 75), Delray Beach (Atlantic Avenue, exit 81) and Boynton Beach (Boynton Beach Boulevard, exit 86).

The turnpike narrows from a three-lane to a four-lane highway as it goes through a less developed portion of Palm Beach County, crossing interchanges with Lake Worth Road, followed by the Lake Worth/West Palm Beach Service Plaza at mile marker 94. In West Palm Beach, the highway has interchanges with US 98/SR 80 (Southern Boulevard), a SunPass-only interchange at Jog Road, followed by an interchange at Okeechobee Boulevard (exit 99) that heads directly into downtown West Palm Beach. North of the interchange, the highway enters stretch of sparse development between this point and Port St. Lucie, intersecting with the Beeline Highway, another SunPass only interchange before leaving West Palm Beach. Just north of the SR 786 interchange in Palm Beach Gardens (exit 109), I-95 parallels the Turnpike to the east for about 20 miles (32 km), with I-95 visible from the turnpike as it has an interchange with SR 706 (exit 116) in Jupiter and into Martin County. It breaks off as it crosses the Thomas B. Manuel Bridge over the St. Lucie Canal, crossing I-95 without an interchange just south of the SR 714 interchange, the only exit in Martin County. I-95 heads west towards the western fringes of St. Lucie County development, while the turnpike takes a path through the central areas of the county. The turnpike has two interchanges in Port St. Lucie, one at Becker Road (exit 138), the third SunPass-only exit, and SR 716 (exit 142), followed by the Port St. Lucie-Fort Pierce service plaza at mile marker 144. The turnpike intersects I-95 one last time just south of SR 70 (exit 152) in Fort Pierce, as I-95 continues to head up the east coast of Florida and the turnpike curves inland towards Orlando.The turnpike also gains a wider median.

=== Fort Pierce to Wildwood ===
North of the SR 70 interchange, the turnpike enters a rural area, with cattle farms and orange groves lining the road for most of the section between Fort Pierce and Kissimmee, with only one interchange: SR 60 in Yeehaw Junction (exit 193). There are two service plazas in this area, one at Fort Drum at mile marker 184 and the other, Canoe Creek, at mile marker 229. Between Fort Pierce and Yeehaw Junction, the turnpike travels in a nearly east–west direction heading inland, with a 40.5-mile (65.2 km) gap between exits (excluding Fort Drum 32.2 miles [51.8 km] north of Fort Pierce), the second longest of any US expressway. Between Yeehaw Junction and Kissimmee, the turnpike, returning to a north-northwest direction towards Orlando, has a 48.9-mile (78.7 km) stretch (47 miles [76 km] southbound) without an exit (excluding Canoe Creek 37.0 miles [59.5 km] north of Yeehaw Junction), the longest of any US expressway. It then passes exit 240 located at Clay Whaley Road, a partial interchange featuring a northbound on-ramp and southbound off-ramp only. After interchanges with US 192/US 441 (exit 242 northbound, exit 244 southbound) and the Osceola Parkway (exit 249), the turnpike enters Orange County and Orlando, expanding to eight lanes north of the latter interchange and quickly intersecting SR 417 (Central Florida GreeneWay) (exit 251). Exit 254 in Sky Lake is a massive combined interchange with both US 17/US 92/US 441 (Orange Blossom Trail) and SR 528 (Beachline Expressway), which combines a series of partial cloverleaf interchanges with access ramps from side roads. The turnpike then intersects with Consulate Drive (southbound exit 255) and SR 482 (Sand Lake Road) (future exit 257).

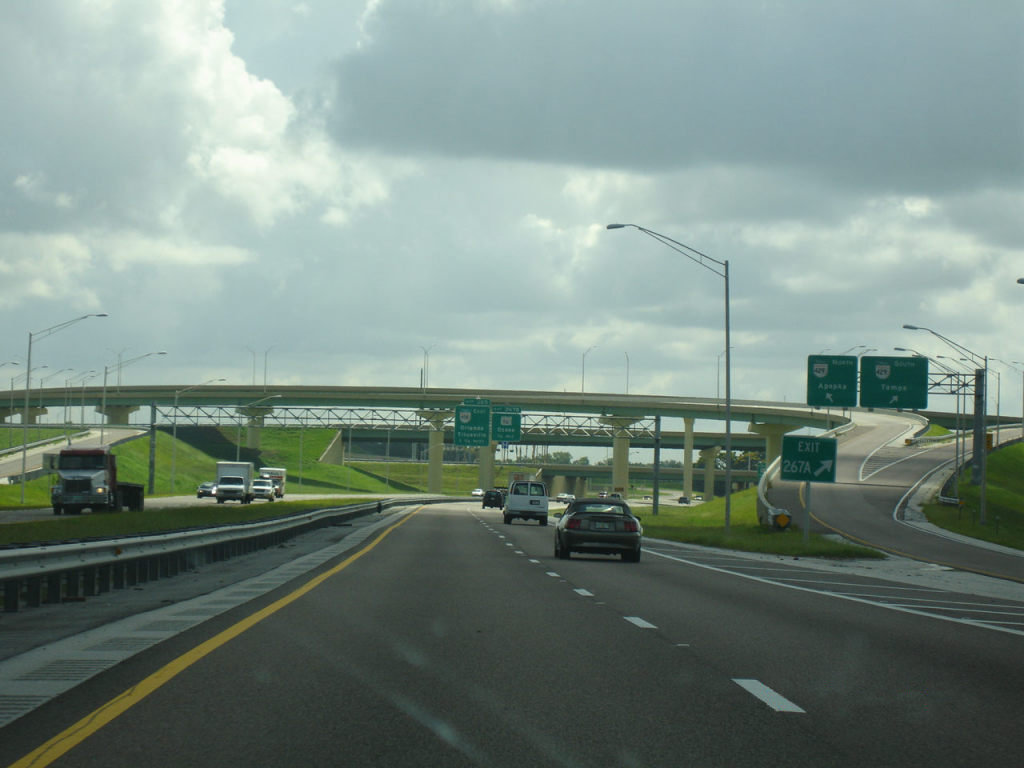
Florida's Turnpike southbound at the interchange with SR 429 in Ocoee, Exit 267A, before expansion to four lanes in each direction

After passing the I-4 interchange (exit 259) near many of Orlando's theme parks, connecting directly with the I-4 express lanes to and from the east along I-4, the Turnpike moves in a northwest direction, first passing by the Turkey Lake Service Plaza at mile marker 263, where the FDOT district headquarters of the Turnpike are located. The Turnpike has the next two interchanges with Orlando area tollways, SR 408 (East–West Expressway) at exit 265 and SR 429 (Western Expressway) at exit 267A, where in between the two exits, the turnpike expands to become a twelve-lane highway, and reverting to an eight-lane highway north of the SR 429 interchange. The last two Orange County interchanges are with SR 50 five miles apart at exit 267B and 272. The Turnpike then enters Lake County, heading in a northwestern direction, where hilly countryside becomes a part of the terrain for the remainder of the expressway while intersecting with Hancock Road (exit 278) in Minneola, an electronic toll interchange. At mile 285, it has a northbound exit/southbound entrance with US 27, followed by the Leesburg electronic toll gantry at mile 288, and a southbound exit/northbound entrance with US 27 at mile 289. The last interchange in Lake County is with County Road 470 (exit 296), which does not provide cash.

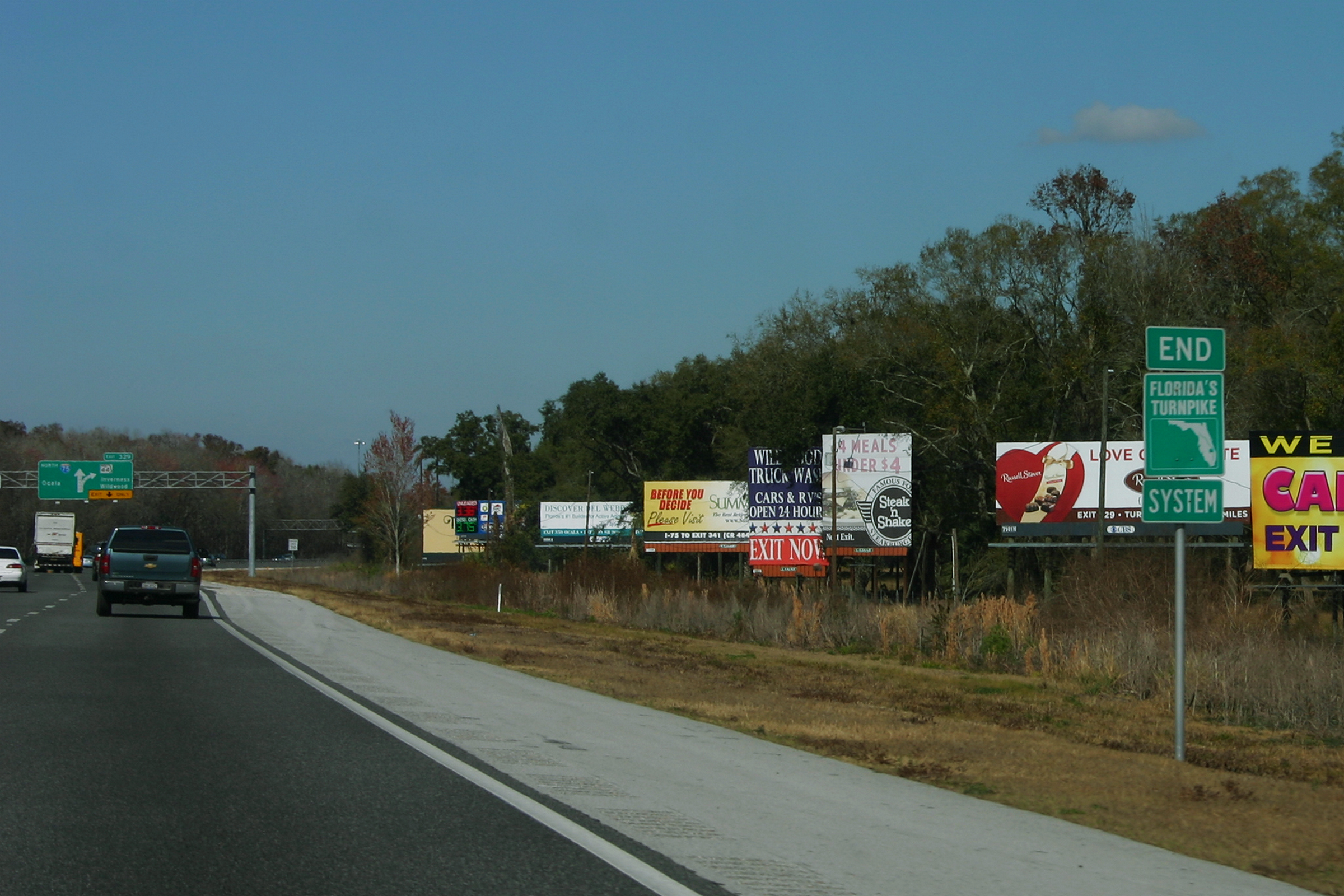
Northern terminus at I-75 near Wildwood in January 2012

At mile marker 299, the turnpike passes through the final service plaza, the Okahumpka service plaza just northwest of the Lake-Sumter County Line. Between US 301 (exit 304) and the northern terminus (mile 309), there is no toll. The turnpike ends with an interchange with I-75 in Wildwood, about 20 miles (32 km) south of Ocala. Exit 307 at SR 44 provides access to southbound I-75 through that interstate's exit 329, while northbound I-75 travelers (and bidirectional SR 44 travelers) can access the turnpike at this exit.

== Tolls ==
Tolls on the turnpike are an average of 6.7 cents per mile (4.2 ¢/km) for cars and other two-axle vehicles using SunPass. A trip on the entire turnpike (not including the Homestead Extension) would cost $22.59 with Toll-by-Plate, and $17.45 with SunPass.

The turnpike was originally entirely on the ticket system, but due to congestion in the Miami and Orlando metro areas, a barrier toll system was implemented from the Three Lakes toll plaza north to the terminus at I-75, and from Lantana south to I-95, in the 1990s.

The SunPass electronic toll collection system, in use since 1999, has become the primary method of paying tolls on the turnpike, with 80% of customers using the system as of October 2009. SunPass can be used on most Florida toll roads, in conjunction with other electronic toll collection systems in Florida (E-Pass and LeeWay). SunPass users benefit from an average of a 25% discount on tolls and access to SunPass-only exit ramps. SunPass transponders are available at the gift shop and gas stations at all service plazas, as well as Walgreens, Publix, and CVS stores statewide. Since 2021, E-ZPass, which is used primarily in the Midwest and Northeast U.S., has also been accepted on Florida's Turnpike.

As the Turnpike and its system of roads are primary routes for emergency evacuations, tolls may be suspended, in cooperation with the state's emergency operations center and county governments, when a state or national emergency, most common being a hurricane watch, warrant rapid movement of the population.

== Services ==
=== Service plazas ===
Turkey Lake Plaza in July 2013

Eight service plazas are located along the turnpike, spaced about 45 miles (72 km) apart. All eight plazas are open 24 hours a day and located on the center median of the turnpike for access from both directions and offer gasoline, diesel fuel, internet access, travel and tourism info and tickets, picnic areas, TV news, gift shops offering Florida Lottery, family-friendly restrooms, and pay phones. A convenience store/gas station is located at the Snapper Creek plaza on the Homestead Extension of the turnpike, while the remaining seven are full-service plazas, featuring a selection of franchised fast food restaurants. Three of the service plazas (Pompano, Port St. Lucie/Fort Pierce, Turkey Lake) also provide E85 ethanol. The Turkey Lake, Ft. Drum plaza, Canoe Creek, Okahumpa, Port St. Lucie, West Palm Beach, and Pompano Beach plazas also have Tesla Superchargers for Tesla electric vehicles.

The operation of Sunshine State Parkway gas stations and service centers was originally bid out under separate contracts, and as a result, differing petroleum brands operated concurrently along the parkway, with varying levels of service and pricing. This practice was discontinued in 1995 when all service center operations were combined to improve supply and continuity of service; with Martin Petroleum, a Florida corporation, operating the stations with Citgo brand fuel at its stations. Since then, the Venezuelan government, under President Hugo Chávez, nationalized Citgo, and in 2006, political controversy resulted in a movement to remove the brand from the turnpike.

In 2009, Areas U.S.A. signed a 30-year contract for operation of food and retail concessions, taking over operations from Martin Petroleum and HMSHost. Florida Turnpike Services, L.L.C., Areas' partner, replaced the Citgo brand with Shell, the current brand for gas stations along the turnpike. Many of the restaurant brands were also changed over, with Dunkin' Donuts replacing Starbucks locations as well as KFC, Pizza Hut, Villa Pizza and Wendy's replacing most Popeyes and Burger King locations. The reconstruction and renovation of six of the service plazas began on November 1, 2010, to be completed in 2012. The Okahumpka and Ft. Pierce plazas will begin reconstruction when the other plaza projects are complete. Total renovation costs are estimated at $160 million.

=== Intelligent transportation systems ===
Florida's Turnpike Enterprise operates with intelligent transportation systems (ITS), used to detect and manage incidents on their roadways. The ITS are managed by two traffic management centers (TMCs), one in Pompano Beach and the other in Ocoee, operated by Florida's Turnpike Enterprise 24 hours a day, seven days a week. The system, consisting of closed-circuit television traffic cameras, dynamic message signs, highway advisory radio, and radar vehicle detection system, allow the TMC to see anything from congestion to crashes, to disabled vehicles that may pose a threat to the Turnpike's motorists. When necessary, the TMC will activate the dynamic message signs and highway advisory radio stations to alert motorists of the potential situation, as well as Amber/Silver Alerts.

=== Road Rangers ===
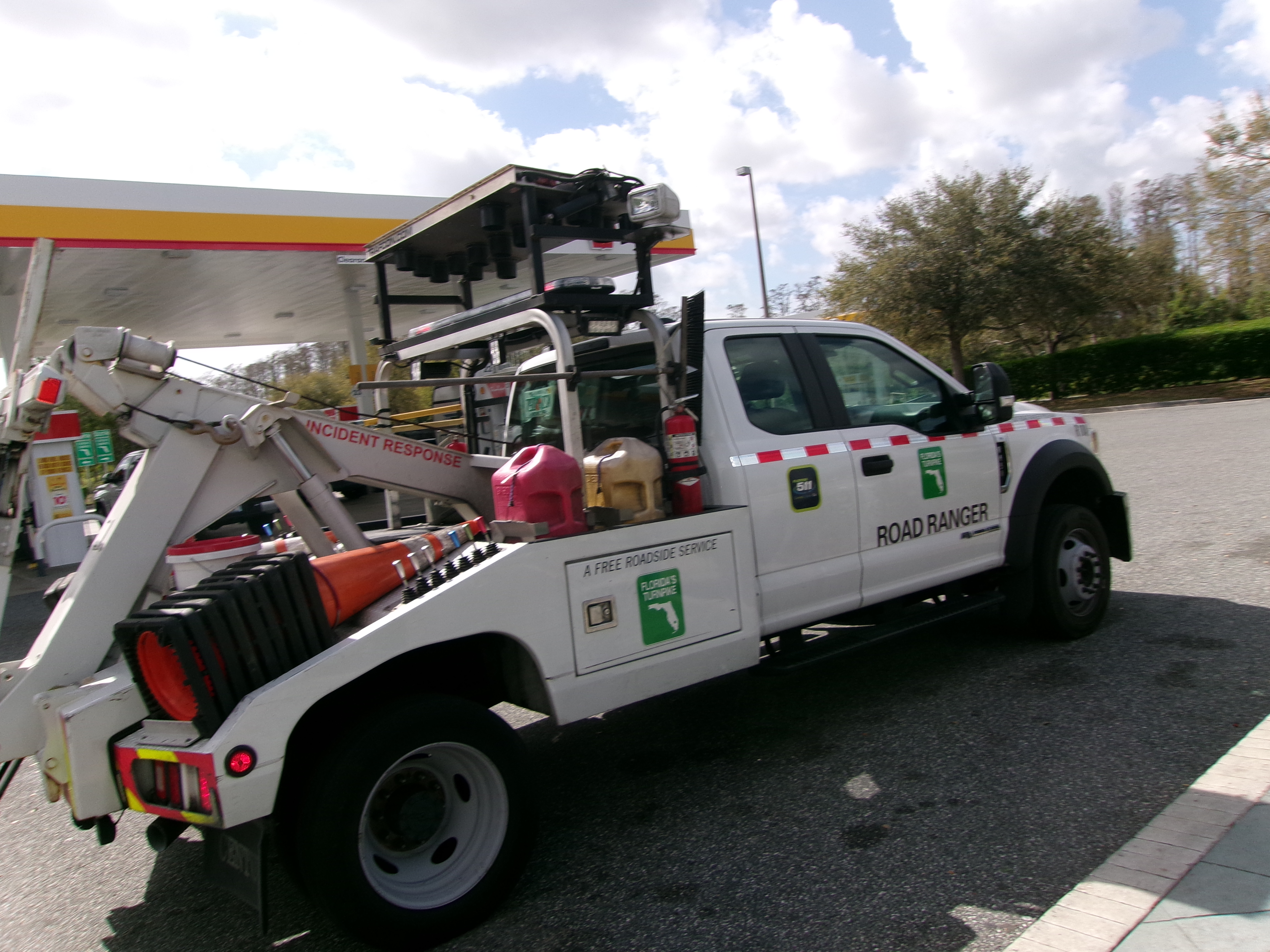
An FDOT/FTE Road Ranger tow truck at the Canoe Creek Service Plaza in March 2025

The Road Rangers Safety Patrol offers free roadside assistance on Florida's Turnpike mainline and Homestead Extension. Utility and tow trucks patrol 12 designated zones looking for stranded motorists to provide services such as fuel, tire changes, and use of a cellular phone; and also watching out for crashes and road debris. The Traffic Management Center dispatches them to accidents, debris removal, disabled vehicles, or anything that may potentially affect the traveling public; they also assist the Florida Highway Patrol with traffic maintenance during incidents involving blockage of lanes.

== History ==
=== Planning ===
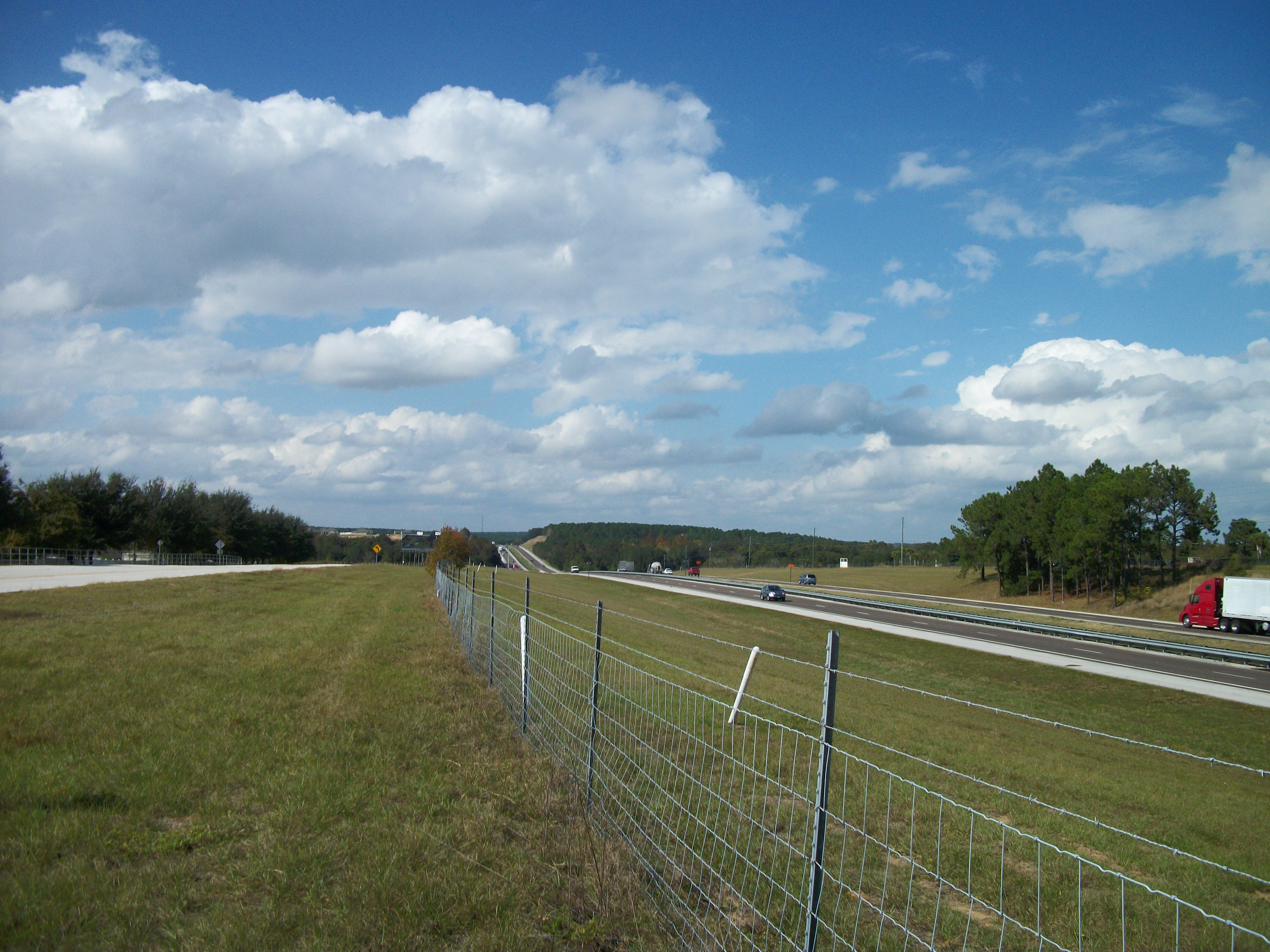
Looking northbound at Florida's Turnpike as seen from the shoulder of Old County Road 50 near Clermont, at mile 276

In the years following World War II, Florida was experiencing unprecedented growth in population and tourism, along with a revitalized citrus industry recovering from a harsh freeze early in the decade; the increased traffic load quickly burdened the state's highway system. South Florida businessman and accounting firm owner Charles B. Costar was concerned that a trip down the east coast of Florida would take days on the available road network, passing through every small beachside town and siphoning off the traffic before visitors reached South Florida. After driving on the Pennsylvania Turnpike during a vacation there, he envisioned a similar high-speed turnpike in Florida. In 1953, Costar led a lobbying group that resulted in the state legislature creating the "Florida Turnpike Act", which Governor Dan McCarty signed into law on July 11, 1953, as well as the Florida State Turnpike Authority, which had the ability to plan, design, and construct bond-financed toll roads, in whose creation Costar was instrumental, to be repaid through the collection of tolls from Turnpike customers.

Thomas B. Manuel, known as the "Father of the Turnpike", served as chairman of the Florida State Turnpike Authority from January 1955 to January 1961. Manuel debated with state legislature members opposed to tollways, emphasizing the need for a good highway system in a tourism-driven state. During the 1955 legislative session, many small-county legislators and others opposed to the Parkway formed a "kill the 'Pike'" coalition; Manuel won over the legislators at his headquarters in the Floridan Hotel near the capitol. Only four votes against the turnpike were entered at the end of the session's roll call, and the Legislature granted permission to build with a $70 million bond issue in June 1955. A Turnpike bridge in Stuart bears his name to honor his contributions.

=== Original construction ===
Construction on the Parkway began on July 4, 1955, starting at what is now the Golden Glades Interchange. In October 1956, all work on the Sunshine State Parkway north of Ft. Pierce was abandoned and plans for a state-long turnpike were shelved due to passage of the National Interstate and Defense Highways Act, which provided for construction of limited-access highways in the corridors that had been under study for the Parkway Extension. One was Interstate 95, which was slated to connect Jacksonville with Miami in a similar alignment to the planned Sunshine State Parkway Coastal Route. This resulted in completion of a truncated 110-mile (180 km) highway that ran from Miami to Fort Pierce, opening on January 25, 1957.

In January 1959, Governor LeRoy Collins, favoring a Parkway extension from Fort Pierce to Orlando, stated that building the Parkway north of Orlando would be unnecessary due to the interstate highway system. In late May 1959, the board authorized a study for the Parkway Extension to Orlando, and connecting the Interstate routes in Florida. In 1961, Governor Collins approved the sale of $80 million in bonds to finance the parkway extension from Fort Pierce to Wildwood, adding another 156 miles (251 km) of roadway and shifting Interstate 75's route 6 miles (10 km) eastward from its original alignment. The extension was opened in three stages: a 61-mile (98 km) section between Yeehaw Junction and Orlando opened on July 17, 1963, a section linking Fort Pierce and Yeehaw Junction opened on November 22, 1963, and the section between Orlando and the northern terminus of I-75 opened on July 24, 1964, completing the mainline.

With the St. Petersburg Times in 1963, a team led by Martin Waldron wrote a total of 150,000 words as part of the newspaper's coverage of unchecked spending by the Florida Turnpike Authority that led to estimated costs quadrupling from initial estimates of $100 million. Waldron received a tip about excessive spending by John Hammer, chairman of the Florida Turnpike Authority, which included expensive hotels and meals, corsages for his secretary and overcharging for a chartered plane. His coverage earned the newspaper the Pulitzer Prize for Public Service in 1964, the first for the newspaper, and led to changes in the way the state of Florida managed highway construction projects.

=== Since completion ===
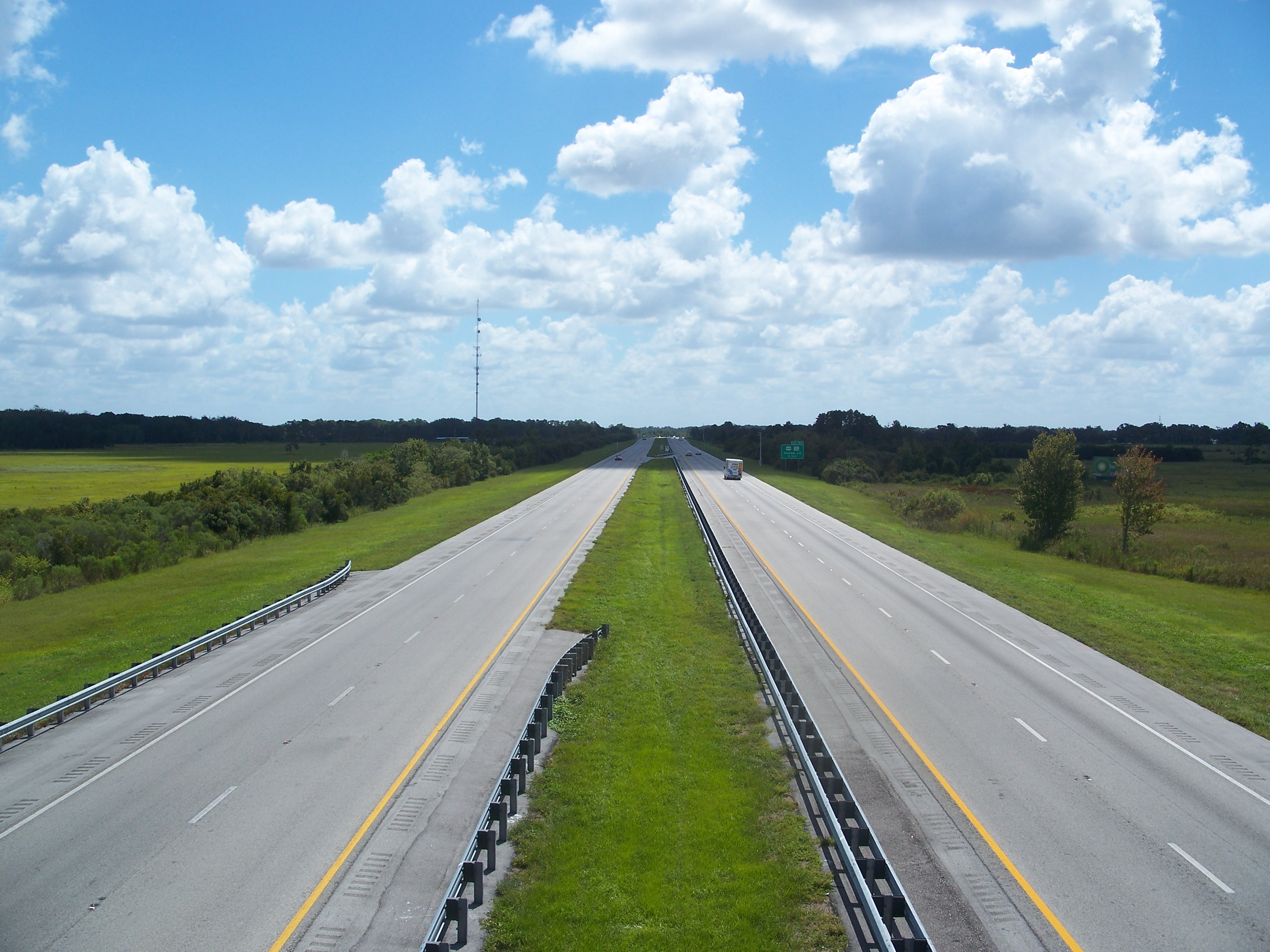
Florida's Turnpike looking southbound from the US 441 overpass, two miles north of the Yeehaw Junction exit

For just over 11 years, the road was known as the Sunshine State Parkway (SSP). On April 12, 1968, the road was renamed to its current name of Florida's Turnpike, to identify that the toll road was located in Florida and to avoid confusion from other Florida landmarks such as the Sunshine Skyway Bridge. The Sunshine State Parkway moniker was commonly used for the next decade, and remnants of the name can be seen on several Turnpike maintenance buildings.

The Florida Department of Transportation was created in July 1969, with the Florida State Turnpike Authority becoming a part of the new FDOT.

On September 1, 1971, the Turnpike switched from a sequential exit numbering system to a hybrid numbering system, where adjacent exit numbers differed by 4 south of SR 60 (exit 60 at the time) and 5 north of SR 60.

The Bureau of Public Roads approved an Interstate 95 alignment that used 41 miles (66 km) of the Turnpike from PGA Boulevard (SR 786) in Palm Beach Gardens north to SR 70 in Ft. Pierce in the 1950s. In the mid-1960s, the State Road Department authorized traffic counts be conducted to determine if the separation of Interstate 95 from the Turnpike was feasible, with arguments that using a concurrent alignment was costing Florida money for federal highway funding, but not without the concern of losing toll revenue. Over time, the interstate adopted a route closer to U.S. Route 1, including parallel between Stuart and Palm Beach Gardens, with the turnpike being removed from the I-95 alignment in 1973, and I-95 being completed in 1987.

With Florida still growing in population in the 1960s, preliminary studies began for expanding portions of the Turnpike to six lanes in South Florida and additional north–south highways in that area. Dade County and the State Road Department developed a plan for the West Dade Expressway (now known as the Homestead Extension of Florida's Turnpike), beginning at the Turnpike near the Dade County/Broward County line, turning westward and southward, and terminating at Florida City in southern Dade County. In 1967, the Florida State Turnpike Authority was authorized to perform engineering and feasibility studies on the West Dade Expressway and the Bee Line Connector extension, now known as the Martin Andersen Beachline Expressway. The results of the studies came in December 1968, but due to an uncertain bond market and an unknown future for the toll authority, decisions on the roads were delayed. In 1969, FDOT and Orange and Dade County officials agreed the Bee Line Connector and Homestead Extension of Florida's Turnpike would be financed by revenue bond issues as extensions of Florida's Turnpike. The Beeline Expressway opened in 1973 and the Homestead Extension opened in 1974 as a part of the Turnpike mainline.

Between 1974 and 1986, the turnpike experienced little change other than maintenance as the original bonds on the road were being paid off. During this period, the turnpike experienced the first of five toll hikes on February 15, 1979, when the cost of a trip from Golden Glades to Wildwood increased to $5.90 from $4.80, the road's original toll.

In 1989, the Turnpike switched its exit numbering system to the mile-log system, starting from the south end of the Homestead Extension, 13 years before Florida's interstates integrated it into their system.

In 1988, the Office of Florida's Turnpike was formed, with $220 million worth of revenue bonds being sold in April 1989 to renovate the toll plazas, service centers and improve the road with the reduction of urban congestion. Four new interchanges were opened by July 1991.

The section between the Golden Glades Plaza and Lantana was converted to a coin drop toll in 1990, the Cypress Creek and Lantana toll plazas were built as part of this project. Coin baskets were installed in 1994 after years of delays.

The portion of road north of Kissimmee was converted to a coin drop system on August 20, 1995.

On July 7, 1995, the Leesburg toll barrier was opened. at this point, the existing Three Lakes toll plaza and Wildwood toll plazas were closed.

Because he "was one of America's most beloved presidents and a true world leader", as the Legislature put it, Florida's Turnpike was designated by the Florida Legislature in 1998 as the Ronald Reagan Turnpike, with 20 signs throughout the turnpike showing the designation.

In April 1999, SunPass was introduced to the public, with SunPass-only interchanges and lanes being introduced throughout the 2000s.

Between 2005 and 2012, the Turnpike spent $380 million doubling the number of lanes from SR 528 to the northernmost interchange with SR 50 west of Winter Garden (exit 272). Most of the section was expanded from four to eight lanes, with the section between SR 408 and SR 429 being expanded from six to twelve lanes. The portion between SR 528 and Interstate 4 opened in 2008, with the portion between I-4 and SR 408 being finished in 2010, SR 408 to Beulah Road (at the north end of the SR 429 interchange) opened in March 2011, and the portion between Beulah Road and SR 50 (exit 272) was completed in 2012.

The HEFT ceased cash toll collections on February 19, 2011, becoming an exclusive electronic toll road, a move announced in November 2009. The staffed toll plazas were converted into electronic toll gantries, and the only ways to pay are either by SunPass transponders or a "toll-by-plate" program. The Turnpike mainline began its conversion to a cashless toll road with the Golden Glades toll barrier being converted into a toll gantry on January 25, 2014, and no longer accepts cash. The portion south of I-595 was converted on August 29, 2015.

In 2007, legislation was passed in Florida to index toll rates across the state to the national Consumer price index (CPI), to be enacted by the end of June 2012. As a result, the toll rates on roads on Florida's Turnpike Enterprise were raised on June 24, 2012, an increase of 11.7% to reflect the previous five years. The legislation allows for SunPass rates to be raised slightly each year, with cash rates going up every five years, with SunPass rates staying about a quarter cheaper than cash rates. In keeping with the legislation, SunPass and toll-by-plate rates were raised again on July 1, 2013 by 2.1%, with cash toll rates projected to stay the same through at least 2014. Toll rate increases were scheduled for every five years, and mid-2017 was the next scheduled date for such an increase. However, a combination of a low inflation rate and problems within the relevant state authorities caused multiple cancellations and changes in schedule for the next increase. The final projected date for an increase in tolls was eventually set for October 29, 2017.

Reconstruction of the northern end of the Turnpike at its junction with Interstate 75 improved the traffic merge pattern between I-75 and SR 44 with new flyover ramps and additional traffic lanes. The northbound off-ramp to SR 44 was completed on September 19, 2019, while southbound on-ramp construction was completed in early November 2019, and the project overall was completed in early January 2020.

The Turnpike Enterprise and OOCEA (now CFX) agreed to build a partial interchange between SR 417 and Florida's Turnpike in the late 2000s, after negotiations dating back to a 1991 field study. The interchange is being built in two phases. The first phase, built by CFX, added ramps from southbound SR 417 to southbound Florida's Turnpike and from northbound Florida's Turnpike to northbound SR 417. Construction on the first phase began in September 2013 and opened on January 26, 2015. The second phase, completing the interchange, was built by the Turnpike Enterprise. After a series of delays, construction began in 2017 and the completed interchange was fully opened on May 21, 2021. As part of the project, the turnpike mainline was widened from four to eight lanes between Osceola Parkway (exit 249) and the Beachline Expressway (SR 528, exit 255).

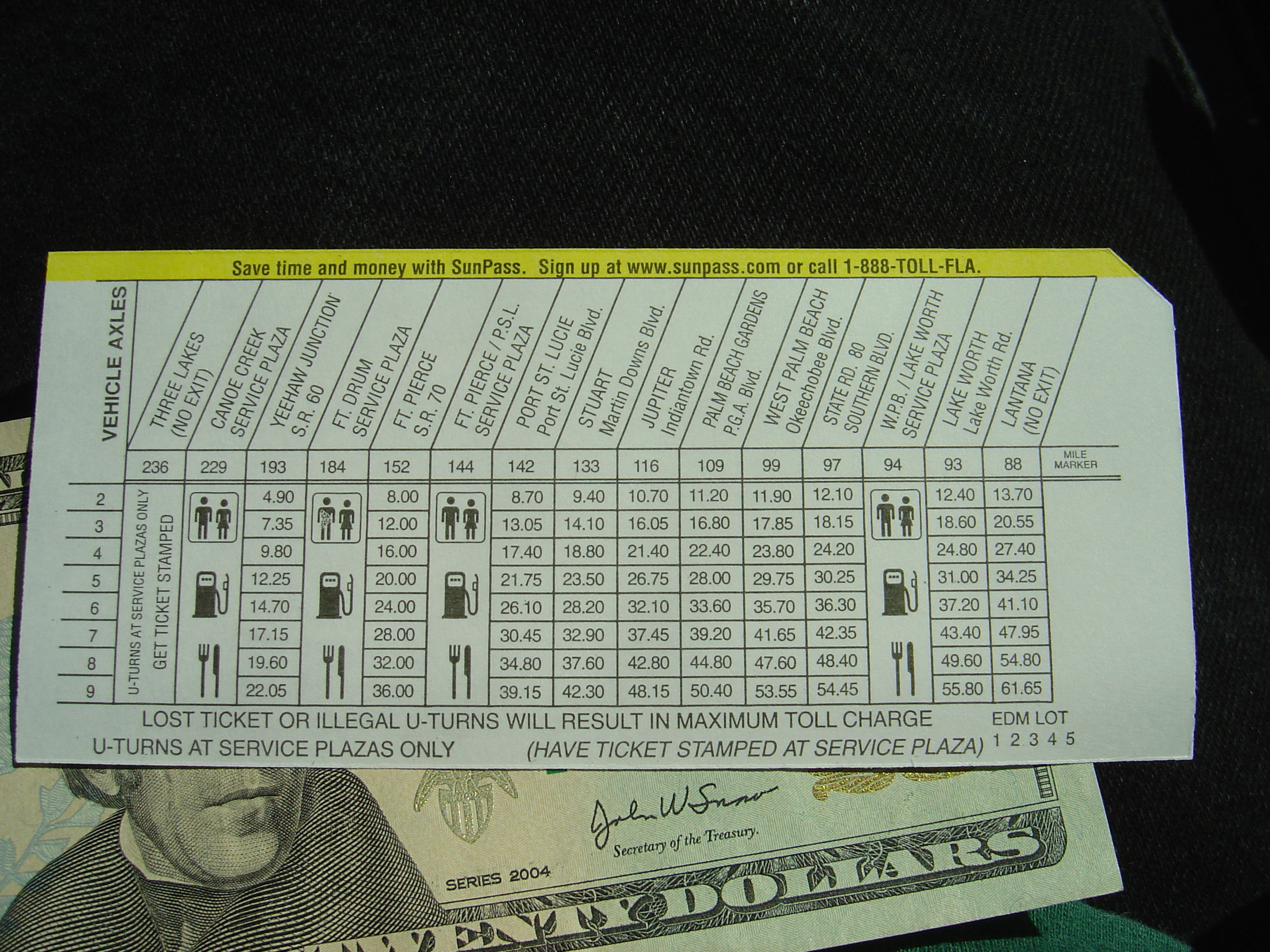
A ticket from Florida's Turnpike for travel between the Three Lakes and Lantana toll plazas (from 2004)

Additional projects to convert the turnpike to an electronic collection system were completed between I-595 and Lantana in 2019, and from SR 429 north to I-75 in Wildwood in 2020. The final stretch of the turnpike to use the ticket system ran between what are now electronic toll gantries at Lantana (mile 89.4 in Palm Beach County) and Three Lakes (mile 236.5 in Osceola County). This section was converted to a cashless system on November 8, 2021, removing the final cash-based toll collections and converting the entire length of the turnpike to electronic toll collection.

== Future ==
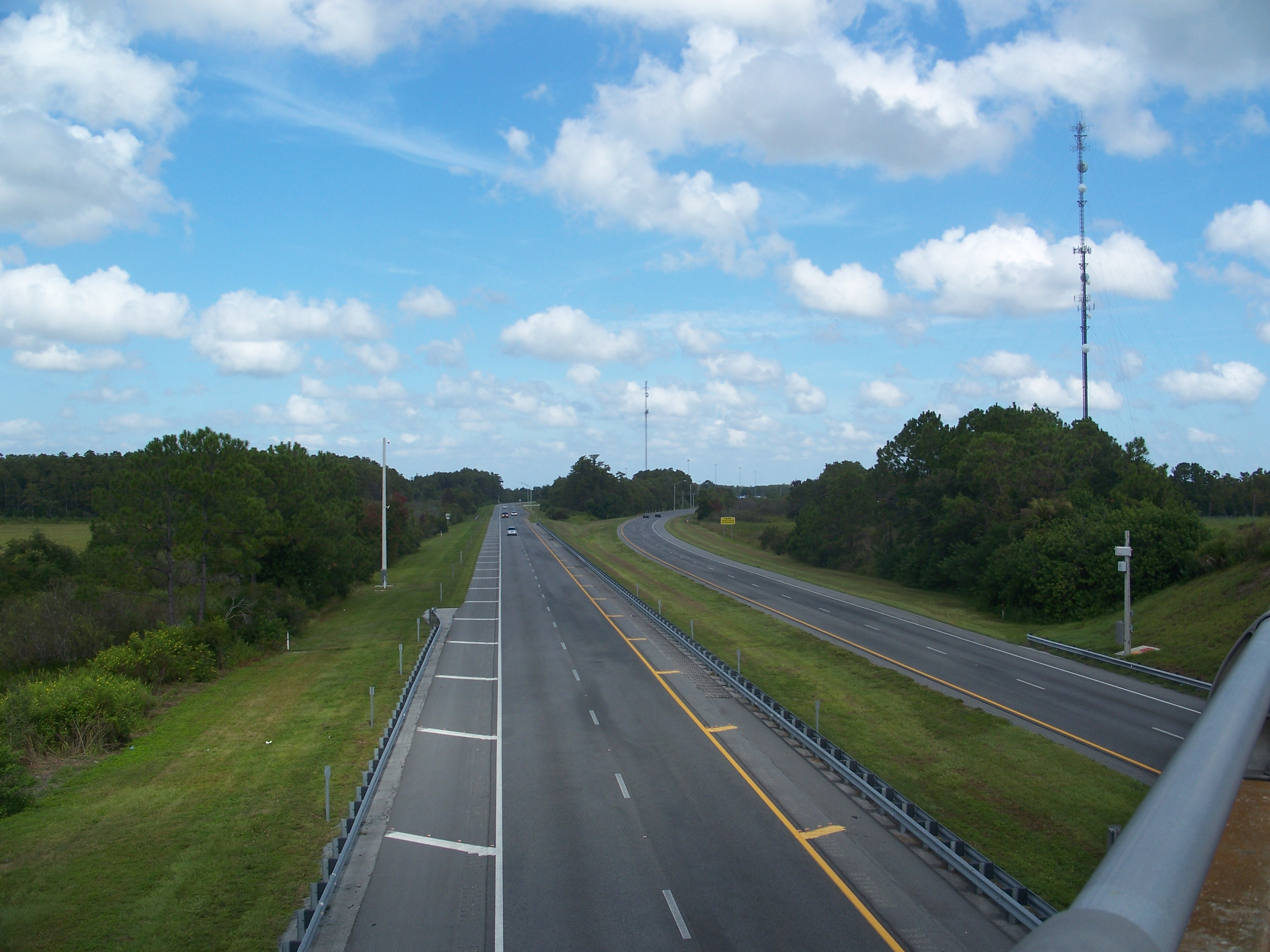
Florida's Turnpike looking northbound from the overpass on Canoe Creek Road, with the Canoe Creek service plaza visible

Plans are in the works to widen the Turnpike from the Lake Worth Road interchange (exit 93) to the State Road 70 exit (exit 152) and from SR 50 (exit 272) to U.S. 27 (northbound exit 285) from four to eight lanes. In Miami-Dade County, several widening projects including new through lanes are underway.

There are plans to widen the Turnpike from Kissimmee Park Road (exit 240) to US 192 (exit 242) and from Neptune Road to just north of Osceola Parkway (exit 249) all from four to eight lanes. A new diverging diamond interchange will be constructed at Nolte Road during this process. Construction is funded for the 2024 fiscal year.

The Turnpike Enterprise is also studying a possible developer-funded future interchange at County Road 468 (mile marker 300, servicing The Villages and Lady Lake). This project is neither funded nor scheduled for construction at this time.

There has been discussion of creating a northern extension.

== Exit list ==
North of the HEFT–Mainline interchange, the mainline continues the mileage from mile 47 from the HEFT. The spur of the mainline south of the HEFT to the Golden Glades Interchange assumes an alternate numbering system that suffixes an X to each exit number.

County	Location	mi	km	Old exit	New exit	Destinations	Notes
Miami-Dade	Miami Gardens	0.000	0.000	0		I-95 (SR 9 north / SR 9A south) / SR 826 west (Palmetto Expressway) / US 441 (SR 7) – Port of Miami, Miami International Airport	Golden Glades Interchange; exit 12A on I-95
Miami-Dade	Miami Gardens	0.300	0.483	—	–	SR 826 east – Beaches	Southbound exit and northbound entrance
Miami-Dade	Miami Gardens	0.500	0.805	Miami Gardens Toll Gantry			
Miami-Dade	Miami Gardens	2.443	3.932	2	2X	NW 199th Street (CR 854) – Stadium	Southbound exit and northbound entrance ETC
Miami-Dade–Broward county line	Miramar–Miami Gardens line	3.765 47.856	6.059 77.017	4	4X	Florida's Turnpike Extension south (SR 821) – Homestead	Transition from HEFT to Mainline; no exit number southbound; opened 1972
Broward	Hollywood	50.346	81.024	8	49	SR 820 (Hollywood / Pines Boulevards)	Signed as exits 49A (west) and 49B (east) southbound, respectively; southbound exit and northbound entrance ETC; To Broward College - South Campus, Big Easy Casino, and Tri-Rail station
Broward	Davie	54.177	87.189	—	53	SR 818 (Griffin Road)	Southbound exit and northbound entrance ETC; To Bergeron Rodeo Grounds; opened 1990
Broward	Davie–Plantation line	55.921	89.996	12	54	I-595 (SR 862) / SR 84 / US 441 (SR 7) to I-95 – Port Everglades, Fort Lauderdale–Hollywood International Airport	Exit 8 on I-595; opened 1989
Broward	Davie–Plantation line	55.921	89.996	—	54X	I-595 Express west to I-75 / SR 869 – Miami, Naples, Coral Springs	Tolled lanes; open peak-direction only
Broward	Plantation	59.284	95.408	16	58	SR 838 (Sunrise Boulevard)	JN McArthur Interchange; Northbound exit and southbound entrance ETC; signed as exit 58A (east) and exit 58B (west) northbound; Access to HCA Plantation Emergency (formerly Plantation General Hospital); To Lauderhill Performing Arts Center and Tri-Rail station
Broward	Tamarac	63.011	101.406	20	62	SR 870 (Commercial Boulevard)	Northbound exit and southbound entrance ETC; opened 1967
Broward	North Lauderdale	64.500	103.803	Cypress Creek Toll Gantry			
Broward	Coconut Creek	66.000	106.217	Pompano Beach Service Plaza and Operations Center			
Broward	Coconut Creek–Pompano Beach city line	66.432	106.912	—	66	SR 814 (Atlantic Boulevard)	Northbound exit and southbound entrance; To Harrah's Pompano Beach; opened 1994
Broward	Coconut Creek–Pompano Beach city line	67.577	108.755	24	67	Coconut Creek Parkway (CR 912 west) / M.L. King Boulevard – Broward Community College	Southbound exit and northbound entrance ETC; unsigned access to SR 849 (NW 31st Avenue)
Broward	Coconut Creek–Pompano Beach city line	69.588	111.991	26	69	SR 834 (Sample Road)	Trumpet interchange; southbound exit and northbound entrance ETC; To Tradewinds Park, Butterfly World and Tri-Rail station; opened 1982
Broward	Coconut Creek	71.736	115.448	—	71	SR 869 south (Sawgrass Expressway) – Coral Springs	ETC interchange; exit 21 on SR 869; opened 1986
Palm Beach	Hamptons at Boca Raton–Boca West line	76.086	122.449	28	75	SR 808 (Glades Road)	Northbound exit and southbound entrance ETC; To Florida Atlantic University, Morikami Museum and Japanese Gardens, and Tri-Rail station; opened 1964
Palm Beach		82.003	131.971	32	81	SR 806 (Atlantic Avenue)	Northbound exit and southbound entrance ETC; To Tri-Rail station
Palm Beach		87.143	140.243	—	86	SR 804 (Boynton Beach Boulevard)	Northbound exit and southbound entrance ETC; Access to Baptist Health Bethesda Hospital West; To Boynton Beach Mall; opened 1993
Palm Beach	Boynton Beach	89.400	143.875	Lantana Toll Gantry			
Palm Beach	Wellington–Greenacres line	93.303	150.157	36	93	SR 802 (Lake Worth Road)	To Tri-Rail station; opened 1979
Palm Beach	Wellington–Greenacres line	94.500	152.083	West Palm Beach Service Plaza			
Palm Beach		95.916	154.362	Forest Hill Boulevard Toll Gantry			
Palm Beach		97.655	157.160	—	97	US 98 / SR 80 (Southern Boulevard)	Access to President Donald J. Trump International Airport; To Amphitheatre, South Florida Fairgrounds; opened 2002
Palm Beach		98.470	158.472	Belvedere Road Toll Gantry			
Palm Beach		99.594	160.281	—	98	Jog Road	Northbound exit and southbound entrance; opened 2007
Palm Beach		100.463	161.680	40	99	SR 704 (Okeechobee Boulevard)	To Tri-Rail station
Palm Beach	West Palm Beach	104.000	167.372	45th Street Toll Gantry			
Palm Beach	Palm Beach Gardens	106.814	171.900	—	107	SR 710 (Beeline Highway)	Opened 2006
Palm Beach	Palm Beach Gardens	108.371	174.406	Palm Beach Gardens Toll Gantry			
Palm Beach	Palm Beach Gardens	109.662	176.484	44	109	SR 786 (PGA Boulevard)	Access to Palm Beach Gardens Medical Center; opened 1975
Palm Beach	Jupiter	112.871	181.648	Jupiter Toll Gantry			
Palm Beach	Jupiter	116.537	187.548	48	116	SR 706 (Indiantown Road) to I-95 – Jupiter, Okeechobee, Daytona Beach, West Palm Beach	To Jonathan Dickinson State Park, Battlefield Park
Martin	St. Lucie River	131.487	211.608	Thomas B. Manuel Bridge			
Martin	Palm City	132.547	213.314	Stuart Toll Gantry			
Martin	Palm City	134.660	216.714	52	133	SR 714 – Stuart (Martin Downs Boulevard)	
Martin	Palm City	137.594	221.436	Palm City Toll Gantry			
St. Lucie	Port St. Lucie	138.413	222.754	—	138	Becker Road – Port St. Lucie, Palm City	Opened 2007
St. Lucie	Port St. Lucie	141.393	227.550	Port St. Lucie Toll Gantry			
St. Lucie	Port St. Lucie	143.321	230.653	54	142	SR 716 east (Port St. Lucie Blvd.) – Port St. Lucie	Access to St. Lucie Medical Center to the east and Tradition Medical Center to the west; To Stadium; opened 1978
St. Lucie	Port St. Lucie	144.7	232.9	—	144	Crosstown Parkway	Proposed interchange
St. Lucie	Port St. Lucie	145.300	233.838	Port St. Lucie / Fort Pierce Service Plaza			
St. Lucie	Port St. Lucie			—	150	Midway Road (CR 712)	Proposed partial interchange; will be northbound exit southbound entrance; Construction slated for early 2027
St. Lucie	Port St. Lucie	149.698	240.916	Midway Road Toll Gantry			
St. Lucie	Fort Pierce	152.915	246.093	56	152	SR 70 / SR 713 to I-95 – Fort Pierce, Vero Beach, Okeechobee	To Indian River State College
St. Lucie		154.000	247.839	Fort Pierce Toll Gantry			
Indian River	No major junctions						
Okeechobee		185.100	297.890	Fort Drum Service Plaza			
Indian River	No major junctions						
Osceola	Yeehaw Junction	193.182	310.896	60	193	US 441 / SR 60 – Yeehaw Junction	
Osceola		230.200	370.471	Canoe Creek Service Plaza			
Osceola	St. Cloud	236.500	380.610	Three Lakes Toll Gantry			
Osceola	St. Cloud	239.493	385.427	—	240	Clay Whaley Road	Formerly served (CR 525) Kissimmee Park Road but the newly built Clay Whaley Road cut off its complete access to the Turnpike in 2022; Interchange will be demolished once Nolte Road Interchange is built; Southbound exit and northbound entrance; ETC interchange; opened 2007; renamed 2024
Osceola	St. Cloud			—	240	Nolte Road	Currently under construction; will be tolled southbound exit and northbound entrance; will replace Clay Whaley Road exit
Osceola	St. Cloud	244.613	393.666	65	242 (NB); 244 (SB)	US 192 / US 441 – Kissimmee, St. Cloud, Walt Disney World Resort	Southbound Exit and Northbound/Southbound Entrances tolled; Northbound Exit not tolled; access to St. Cloud Hospital; northbound connection opened in 1995
Osceola	Kissimmee–Buenaventura Lakes line	248.841	400.471	—	249	Osceola Parkway (CR 522) – Walt Disney World Resort	Southbound exit and northbound entrance ETC; opened 1995
Orange	Southchase	250.750	403.543	—	251	SR 417 (Central Florida GreeneWay) – Tampa, Daytona Beach	SR 417 exit 12; southbound exit and northbound entrance ETC. Northbound exit ramp to SR 417 north opened 2015; interchange opened fully on May 21, 2021. To Orlando International Airport.
Orange	Orlando			—	253	Taft Vineland Road	Proposed interchange; construction slated for Q3 2026
Orange	Orlando	255.366	410.972	70	254	SR 528 (Beachline Expressway) / US 17 / US 92 / US 441 (Orange Blossom Trail) – Orlando International Airport	Southbound exit and northbound entrance ETC; exit 4 on SR 528
Orange	Orlando	256.040	412.056	—	255	Consulate Drive	Southbound exit only; ETC interchange; opened 2004
Orange	Orlando			—	257	SR 482 (Sand Lake Road) to CR 423 (S John Young Pkwy)	Currently under construction; will contain southbound exit and northbound entrance ETC
Orange	Orlando	259.697	417.942	75	259	I-4 (SR 400) – Orlando, Tampa, Daytona Beach	Southbound exit and northbound entrance ETC; exit 77 on I-4; opened April 18, 1967
Orange	Orlando				—	I-4 Express east	Northbound exit and southbound entrance; opened 2022 alongside express lanes
Orange	Orlando	263.700	424.384	Turkey Lake Service Plaza and Enterprise Headquarters			
Orange	Gotha	266.020	428.118	—	265	SR 408 east (East–West Expressway) – Orlando, Titusville	Western end of SR 408
Orange	Ocoee	267.886	431.121	80	267B	SR 50 – Ocoee	Access to Health Central
Orange	Ocoee	268.033	431.357	—	267A	SR 429 (Western Expressway) – Daytona Beach, Tampa	SR 429 exit 22
Orange	Oakland	273.005	439.359	—	272	SR 50 – Winter Garden, Clermont	Northbound exit and southbound entrance ETC; opened 1993
Lake	Minneola			—	278	Minneola	Access via Hancock Road to AdventHealth Minneola; northbound exit and southbound entrance ETC; opened 2017
Lake	Minneola	281.000	452.226	Minneola Toll Gantry			
Lake	Groveland	285.810	459.967	85	285	US 27 (SR 25) / SR 19 – Leesburg, Clermont	Currently no southbound exit; to become a full interchange by 2028
Lake		288.000	463.491	Clermont Toll Gantry			
Lake		289.052	465.184	—	289	US 27 (SR 25) to SR 19 – Tavares, Clermont	Southbound exit and northbound entrance; ETC interchange
Lake	Leesburg	296.607	477.343	—	296	CR 470 – Leesburg	Southbound exit and northbound entrance ETC; opened 2005
Sumter	The Villages			—	300	CR 468 – The Villages	Proposed interchange
Sumter	Wildwood	300.200	483.125	Okahumpka Service Plaza			
Sumter	Wildwood	305.368	491.442	90	304	US 301 – Wildwood	
Sumter	Wildwood	308.753	496.890	—	307	SR 44 – Inverness, Wildwood	Single northbound ramp that merges with I-75 exit 329; southbound ramp from SR 44 to Turnpike
Sumter		308.757	496.896	—	—	I-75 north (SR 93) – Ocala	Exit 328 on I-75; access to northbound I-75 and access from southbound I-75
1.000 mi = 1.609 km; 1.000 km = 0.621 mi: Electronic toll collection; Incomplete access; Route transition; Unopened

== See also ==
- Homestead Extension of Florida's Turnpike
- Florida's Turnpike Enterprise
- List of toll roads in Florida
