= Witham Field =

Airport in Florida, U.S.

Coordinates: 27°10′54.10″N 080°13′15.90″W

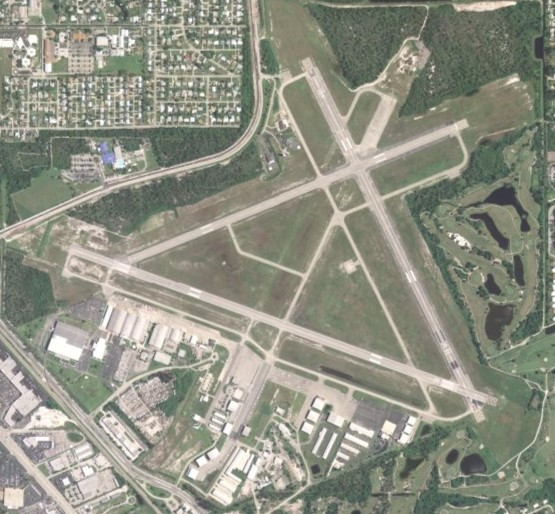
- USGS 2006 orthophoto
- IATA: SUA; ICAO: KSUA; FAA LID: SUA

Summary
- Airport type: Public use
- Owner: Martin County Board of Commissioners
- Operator: Michael C. Moon
- Serves: Stuart, Florida
- Location: Martin County, Florida
- Hub for: Tradewind Aviation
- Elevation AMSL: 18 ft (5.5 m)
- Website: martin.fl.us/Airport

Maps
- FAA airport diagram
- Interactive map of Witham Field

Runways
Direction	Length		Surface
Direction	ft	m	Surface
7/25	4,652	1,418	Asphalt
12/30	5,828	1,776	Asphalt
16/34	4,998	1,523	Asphalt

Statistics (2016)
- Aircraft operations: 120,556
- Based aircraft: 285
- Source: Federal Aviation Administration

Witham Field (IATA: SUA, ICAO: KSUA, FAA LID: SUA), also known as Martin County Airport, is a public-use airport located 1 mile (1.6 km) southeast of the central business district of the city of Stuart in Martin County, Florida, United States. The airport is publicly owned.

== History ==
With the onset of World War II, private landowners offered their property to Martin County to build an airport. Martin County's airport was originally known as MacArthur Field, however, it was later named Witham Field in honor of enlisted Naval Aviation Pilot First Class (AP1) Paul "Homer" Witham, who was the first Naval Aviator from the City of Stuart to die in World War II.

In October 1942, Martin County leased the 900-acre (3.6 km^{2}) airport to the U.S. Government for use as a military training field. The U.S. Navy assumed operation of the airport in exchange for an $800,000 payment to the County. The Navy then committed $10 million to construct and operate a modern naval air station. During the war years, Naval Auxiliary Air Station Witham Field operated as an auxiliary field to Naval Air Station Vero Beach, providing an additional training and proficiency facility for Naval Aviators from the U.S. Navy and U.S. Marine Corps operating carrier-based and land-based fighter and light bomber aircraft.

On July 1, 1947, NAAS Witham Field was decommissioned and the property returned to Martin County. During the 1950s and 1960s, Grumman Aircraft Corporation, now known as Northrop Grumman Space and Mission Systems Corporation, leased much of the airport property, naming it "Plant 77" and conducting flight-testing and manufacturing of parts and subassemblies for various aircraft such as the U.S. Army's OV-1 Mohawk and various U.S. Navy, U.S. Marine Corps and U.S. Coast Guard aircraft. This is also where the Stuart Air Show performs every November.

In 1994, Northrop Grumman downsized their Witham Field operation and much of the property was again returned to Martin County, including responsibility for the airport's air traffic control tower. The county, in turn, hired an Airport Director to manage the property. Martin County now operates the 726-acre (2.94 km^{2}) airport, and although there is no scheduled commercial airline service at the airport, the facility does continue to maintain an operational air traffic control tower and is home to two fixed-base operators (FBO) and more than 200 private and business aircraft. The airport previously had scheduled passenger service operated by Air Florida which in 1984 was operating seven daily departures to West Palm Beach (PBI) with six of these flights then continuing on to Miami (MIA) on a direct one stop basis.

Every November, the airport hosts the Stuart Air Show, although in 2019 the show was cancelled after a practice run resulted in a fatal crash and inclement weather moved into the area.

== See also ==
- List of airports in Florida
