= St. Lucie River =

River in the United States of America

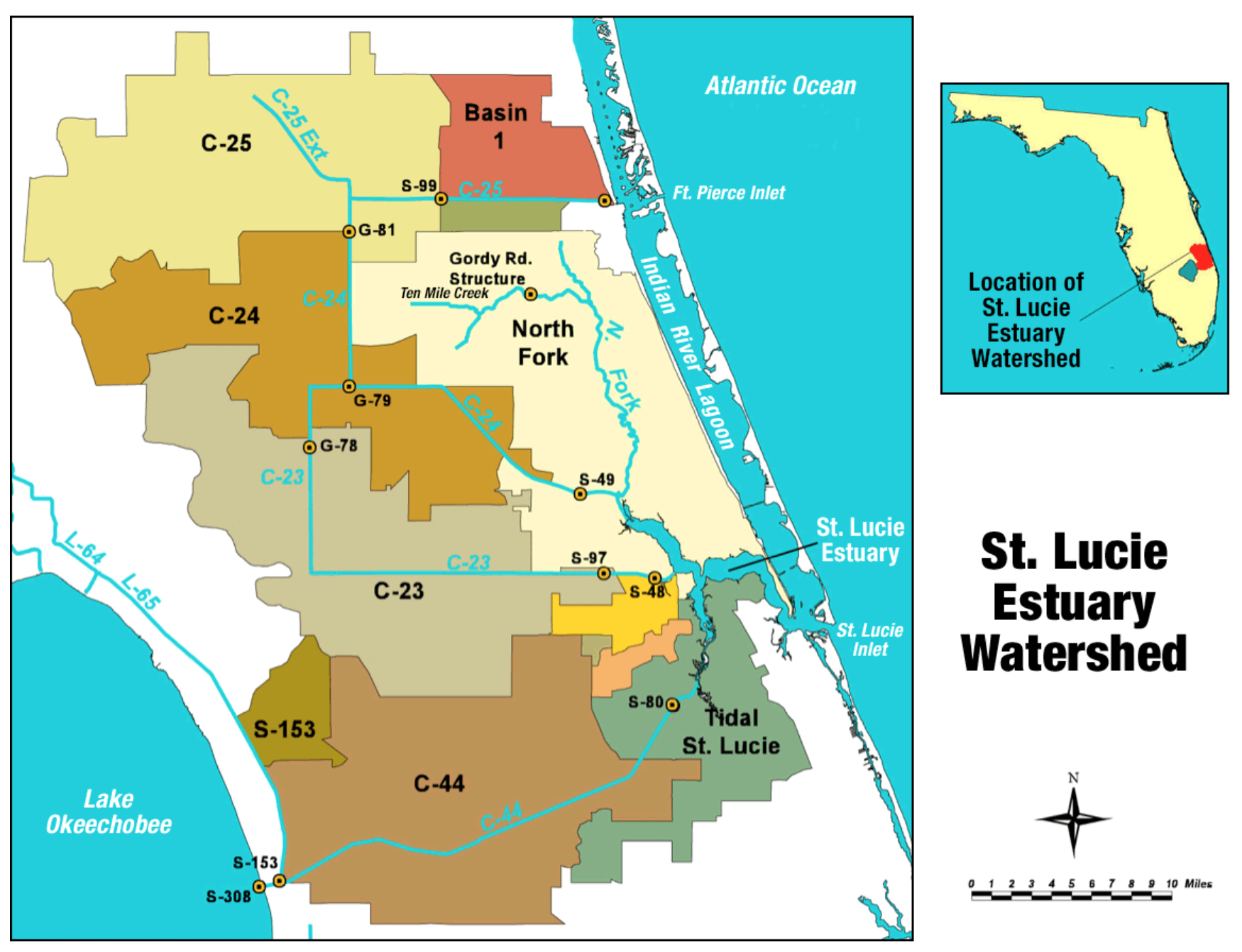
St. Lucie Estuary Watershed

The St. Lucie River is a 35-mile-long (56 km) estuary linked to a coastal river system in St. Lucie and Martin counties in the U.S. state of Florida. The St. Lucie River and St. Lucie Estuary are an "ecological jewel" of the Treasure Coast, central to the health and well-being of the surrounding communities. The river is part of the larger Indian River Lagoon system, the most diverse estuarine environment in North America with more than 4,000 plant and animal species, including manatees, oysters, dolphins, sea turtles and seahorses.

Historically, the St. Lucie was a freshwater river with no connection to either the Atlantic Ocean or Lake Okeechobee. In 1892, an inlet was dug by local residents to provide direct access to the Atlantic Ocean. During the 1900s, the river and its watershed underwent a series of modifications for navigation, flood control and water supply purposes, thus changing the St. Lucie from a river to an estuary.

== Location ==
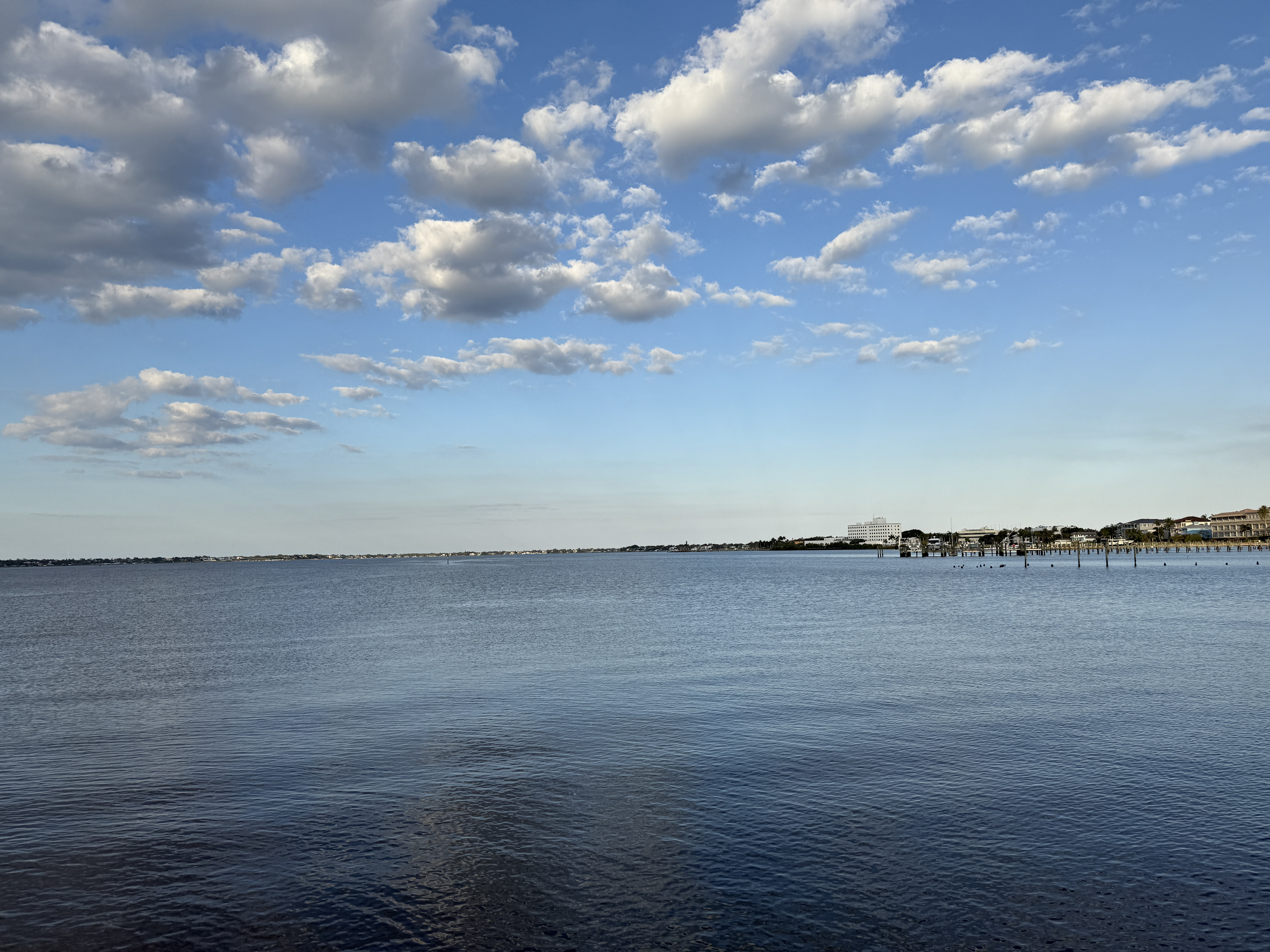
St. Lucie River in Stuart

The North Fork of the St. Lucie River flows south from St. Lucie County into Martin County where it joins the north-flowing South Fork, which was once called the Halpatiokee River, just south of the old Roosevelt Bridge (Old Dixie Highway) in Stuart to form the main St. Lucie River. It then passes under the Florida East Coast Railway drawbridge and the new high-level Roosevelt Bridge (U.S. Route 1) and flows east with Rio on the north side and Stuart on the south until it reaches the northern end of the Sewall's Point peninsula, where it runs south under the Evans Crary Bridge to the end of Sewall's Point, where it flows into the Indian River Lagoon directly west of the St. Lucie Inlet which goes into the Atlantic Ocean. The entire river is accessible to Lake Okeechobee by the Okeechobee Waterway.

The main river passes through Sewall's Point, Port Salerno, Stuart, and Jensen Beach. The South Fork passes through Palm City. Although brackish for most of its length, the salt content of the South Fork diminishes considerably south of the Kanner Highway bridge. The headwaters of the South Fork are located in ranchland and scrub forest, primarily to the east of I-95 and northwest of Hobe Sound. The North Fork passes through Port Saint Lucie and White City. A Club Med resort lies on the eastern shore of the North Fork of the river at Greenridge Point. The North Fork is brackish along most of its length, but takes on the character of a fresh-water creek from White City northward. The headwaters of the North Fork are in the farmlands of St. Lucie County near Interstate 95 at an elevation of 20 feet (6 m) above sea level.

== Discharges ==
In 2016, 237 billion gallons of water was discharged into the St. Lucie River from Lake Okeechobee by the U.S. Army Corps of Engineers between January and November. In 2013, the U.S. Army Corps of Engineers dumped 137 billion gallons of water into the St. Lucie River from Lake Okeechobee. The USACE noted they "do share the concern about the quality of the water being released" but also noted that poor water quality was the state's fault in a release called "setting the record straight."

== Environmental concerns ==
Historic modifications to St. Lucie River, most notably digging of the Okeechobee Waterway (C-44 Navigational Canal), connections with the C-24 and C-23 drainage canals, and the associated water control structures, have impacted water quality throughout the river basin. Intermittent freshwater discharges from Lake Okeechobee have negatively affected the river itself and the connected Indian River Lagoon. The impact takes several forms. First, this water tends to be rich in nutrients as a result of agricultural runoff, and thus has a tendency to cause algae blooms and other imbalances. Second, it contains pollutants found in street runoff and other urban sources, which are carried south by the Kissimmee River from the southern Orlando suburbs into Lake Okeechobee. Third, it is a source of turbidity and particulates that settle along the river bottom as a layer of muck. Fourth, the freshwater brings in high levels of humid substances that limit how far below the surface light can reach, affecting plant and animal life. Finally, the discharges radically reduce salinity levels, making the river temporarily uninhabitable by fauna and flora that are intolerant to fresh water.

In 2013, heavy rains in southern Florida resulted in high runoff into the lake; rising lake levels forced the U.S. Army Corps of Engineers to release large volumes of polluted water from the lake through the St. Lucie River estuary to the east and the Caloosahatchee River estuary to the west. Thus the normal mix of fresh and salt water in those estuaries was replaced by a flood of polluted fresh water resulting in ecological damage.

=== Algae blooms ===
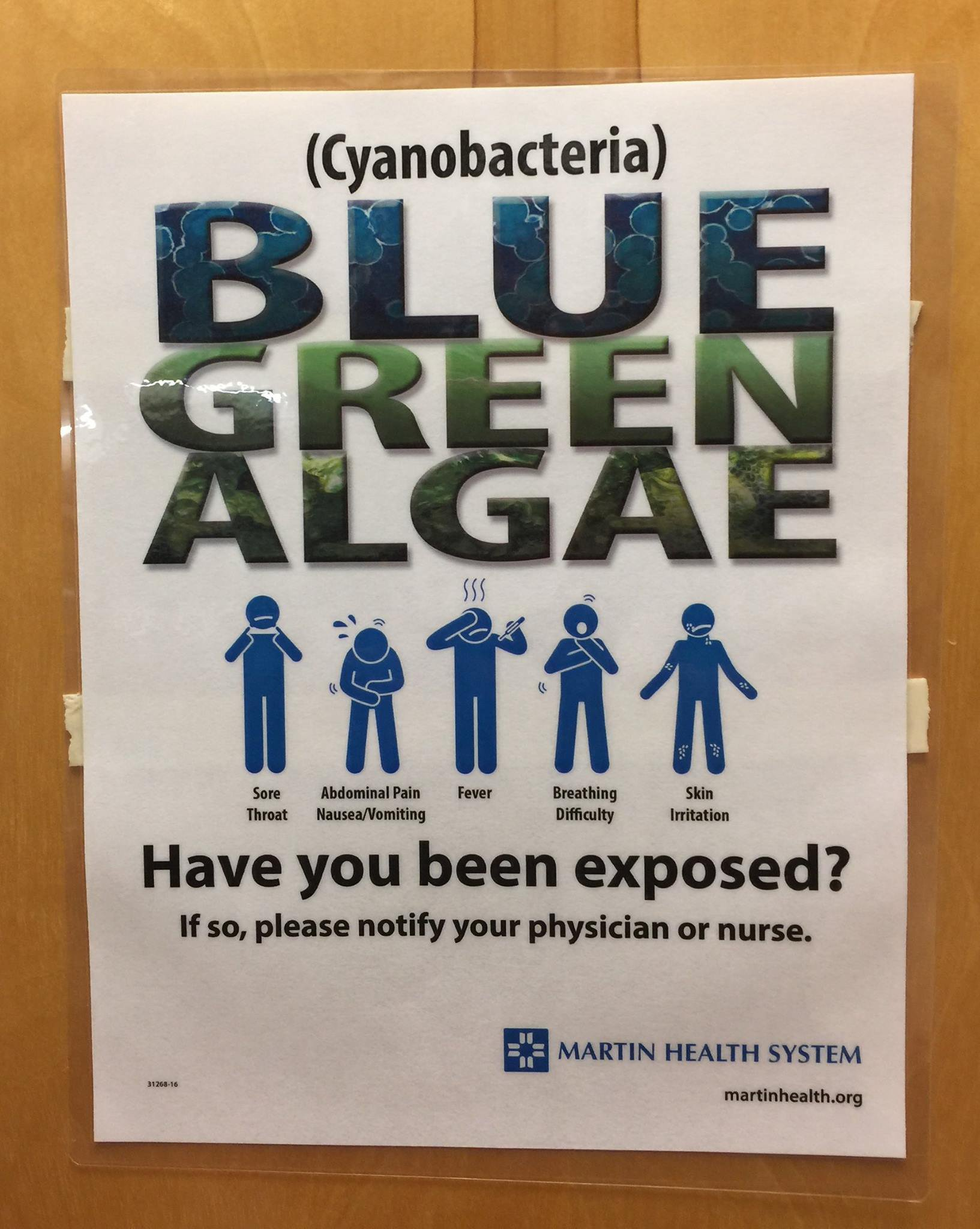
Flyer posted by Martin County's Martin Memorial Hospital warning residents about the 2016 algae blooms.

Harmful algal blooms have been documented in the St. Lucie River since the early 1980s. These blooms occur as the result of nutrient pollution and degraded water quality, and their growth is further stimulated by high temperatures. In 2016, the river experienced the flourishing of extensive algae blooms, along with Lake Okeechobee and the Caloosahatchee River. The cyanobacteria, or blue-green algae, causes numerous severe health consequences for the marine ecosystem as well surrounding human populations. Blooms result in reduced dissolved oxygen concentrations, alterations in aquatic food webs, algal scum lining the shores, the production of compounds that cause distasteful drinking water and fish flesh, and the production of toxins severe enough to poison aquatic as well as terrestrial organisms. Blooms have been reported throughout the continental United States, and resulting cyanotoxins have been associated with human and animal illness and death in at least 43 states. Most cyanobacteria produce the neurotoxin beta-N-methylamino-l-alanine (BMAA) that has been implicated as a significant environmental risk in the development of neurodegenerative diseases such as Alzheimer's disease, Parkinson's disease, and amyotrophic lateral sclerosis (ALS). The cyanobacteria has also been linked to liver cancer, chronic fatigue illness, skin rashes, abdominal cramps, nausea, diarrhea and vomiting.

=== Metal contamination ===
The ecosystem has proven to be contaminated with metals, especially benthic organisms. In 2014, it was determined that 86% of the river's amphipods and hard-shell clams contained copper and zinc concentrations higher than the threshold effect concentrations for Florida sediment quality criteria and the National Oceanic and Atmospheric Administration Screening Quick Reference Tables (SQuiRTs) sediment values.

== Strategies for improvement ==
The South Florida Water Management District and its partners have put together various projects with the intention of improving the river and estuary: The St. Lucie River Watershed Protection Plan, CERP: Indian River Lagoon South (includes the C-44 Reservoir), CERP: Lake Okeechobee Watershed, Central Everglades Planning Project, Water Storage Strategies, Basin Management Action Plan, Herbert Hoover Dike Rehabilitation, Kissimmee River Restoration and Kissimmee Basin Modeling and Operations Study.

=== St. Lucie River Watershed Protection Plan ===
According to the South Florida Water Management District, this plan will address pollutant load reductions based on adopted total maximum daily loads (TMDLs). It will also include a goal for salinity levels and freshwater inflow targets for the St. Lucie Estuary.

== List of crossings ==
This is the list of bridges crossing the river, starting with the North Fork, then going down the main river, and then jumping back to where the South Fork joins the North Fork to form the main river and going south up the South Fork.

Bridge	Route	Location	Coordinates
Culverts passing under Midway Rd.	County Road 712 Midway Road west of Florida's Turnpike	Fort Pierce	27°22′27″N 80°27′03″W
National bridge identification number 944030	County Road 712A McCarty Road between Okeechobee Road and Midway Road.	Fort Pierce	27°22′47″N 80°26′54″W
National bridge identification number 940038	County Road 712B 11 Mile Road between Okeechobee Road and Midway Road.	Fort Pierce	27°23′23″N 80°26′24″W
One lane wooden/timber bridge built in 1987. National bridge identification number 944010.	Gordy Road	Fort Pierce
National bridge identification number 940072	Florida's Turnpike	Fort Pierce	27°24′10″N 80°23′52″W
National bridge identification numbers: 940122 (southbound), 940123 (northbound)	Interstate 95	Fort Pierce
National bridge identification number 940015	County Road 611B Selvitz Road	Fort Pierce
	Florida East Coast Railway "K" Subdivision	Fort Pierce
National bridge identification number 944016	State Road 615 Hawley Road/25th Street/St. James Blvd.	Fort Pierce
National bridge identification number 940035	County Road 712 Midway Road west of Sunrise Blvd.	Fort Pierce
Built in 1984. National bridge identification number 944012.	Prima Vista Boulevard	Port St. Lucie-River Park
	Crosstown Parkway	Port St. Lucie
National bridge identification numbers: 940145 (westbound), 940140 (eastbound)	State Road 716 Port St. Lucie Blvd.	Port St. Lucie
Old Roosevelt Bridge drawbridge	County Road 707 Old Dixie Highway	Stuart
	Florida East Coast Railway Flagler Subdivision drawbridge	Stuart
New Roosevelt Bridge fixed span	U.S. Route 1/State Road 5	Stuart
Evans Crary Bridge fixed span	State Road A1A S.E. Ocean Blvd.	Sewall's Point
Palm City Bridge fixed span	State Road 714 Monterey Rd/Martin Downs Blvd.	Stuart to Palm City
Veterans Memorial Bridge fixed span (National bridge identification number 894062)	Indian Street west of State Road 76	Stuart to Palm City
South Kanner Highway fixed span (National bridge identification number 890127)	State Road 76 east of Interstate 95 interchange	Stuart	27°6′50″N 80°15′21″W
Southwest Gaines Ave. fixed span	Southwest Gaines Ave. just east of intersection of State Road 76 and Lost River Rd. (bridge is now a pedestrian only bridge)	Stuart	27°6′42″N 80°15′22″W

== See also ==
- Port Saint Lucie, Florida
