= Fort Pierce Central High School =

Location
- 4101 S 25th Street; Fort Pierce, Florida 34981; United States; 27.3911°N 80.3510°W

Information
- Type: Public
- Motto: Pride Makes the Difference
- Established: 1970; 56 years ago
- School district: St. Lucie Public Schools
- Principal: Eldrique Gardner
- Staff: 116.92 (FTE)
- Grades: 9–12
- Enrollment: 3,091 (2022–23)
- Student to teacher ratio: 26.44
- Colors: Purple; Gold
- Mascot: Cobras
- Yearbook: The Hamadryad
- Website: https://schools.stlucie.k12.fl.us/fpc

Fort Pierce Central High School is a public high school located in Fort Pierce, Florida, United States. It is part of the St. Lucie Public Schools district.

== History ==
Fort Pierce Central High School opened its doors in 1970 as the first comprehensive high school to serve all students in St. Lucie County. Prior to 1970, high schools in St. Lucie County were segregated, with white students attending Dan McCarty High School and black students attending Lincoln Park Academy. Students were initially unhappy with the forced integration, and the first years of Fort Pierce Central's existence were marred by race riots that occasionally required police intervention.

== Campus ==
The school's original campus was located at 1101 Edwards Road, approximately 1.5 miles northeast of its present located on South 25th Street. The original campus was in use from the school's founding in 1970 until 2008, when the new campus was moved into. The new campus was built in order to both increase student capacity and regain facilities lost during the 2004 hurricanes.

The new campus is modeled after that of Treasure Coast High School, and consists of a large central courtyard entirely surrounded by four buildings. There are four main areas containing classrooms in buildings one, two, and four. Classrooms within these areas were created in a modular "pod" format, with classrooms separated by retractable partitions so that areas can be combined if necessary. Building three is the largest of the four and contains the auditorium, cafeteria, gymnasium, automotive shop, and other elective classrooms.

== Academics ==
The school provides multiple career academies to its students:

- Engineering and Technology
  - Aerospace Institute
  - Automotive
  - Information Technology
- Media and Arts
  - Art
  - Drama
  - Photography
- Band
- Army JROTC
- Dual enrollment

Students have the opportunity to enroll in free traditional college courses through Indian River State College, as well as engineering-focused college courses through the on-campus Embry-Riddle Aeronautical University Gaetz Aerospace Institute. Students in the aerospace program are enrolled as Embry-Riddle students and their coursework will appear on an official college transcript.

== Athletics ==
Athletes from Fort Pierce Central compete as the Cobras and their colors are purple and gold. The school fields teams in 11 boys sports and 11 girls sports including Football, Basketball, Baseball, Cross Country, and Volleyball.

The Cobras play their football games at Lawnwood Stadium approximately 2.5 miles from campus.

=== Rivalry with Westwood ===
Each year, the Cobras football team competes against their crosstown rival Fort Pierce Westwood Academy Panthers in a game known as the Showdown, first competed in 1978. The most recent edition of the rivalry was Showdown 42, in which the Cobras defeated the Panthers 29–28 on October 11, 2021. As of the 2021 season, the Cobras lead the rivalry 22–20.

=== State championships ===
- Football: 1971
- Boys' Track and Field
  - 220 Yard Dash Class 4A: 1978
  - Shot Put Class 4A: 1977
  - Discus Class 4A: 1977
  - Adaptive 200 Meter Dash Class 3A: 2011
  - Adaptive 800 Meter Run Class 3A: 2011
  - Adaptive Shot Put Class 3A: 2011
- Boys' Wrestling (Individual)
  - Pre-Class: 1973 (155)
  - Class 3A: 1994 (135), 1994 (275), 2018 (132), 2021 (220), 2022 (285)
  - Class 5A: 1996 (152)
  - Class 6A: 1995 (140), 1995 (275)
- Girls' Basketball Class 3A: 1987

== Activities ==
The school offers students the following clubs:

- Band and Choir
- Beta Club
- International Key Club
- Law Studies
- Cheerleading
- Creative Writing
- Ocean Bowl
- Psychology Club
- First Priority
- Computer Science Club
- HOSA
- National Honor Society

== Notable alumni ==
=== Athletes ===
- Football
  - Willie Broughton, former professional football player
  - Eddie Edwards, former professional football player
  - Gabe Jacas, current professional football linebacker
  - Jerry Johnson, former professional football player
  - Don Latimer, former professional football player
  - Alonzo Mitz, former professional football player
  - Wonder Monds, former professional football player
- Baseball
  - Michael Brantley, former professional baseball player
  - Ed Hearn, former professional baseball player
  - Jeff Schwarz, former professional baseball player
