= Gabe Jacas =

American football player (born 2004)

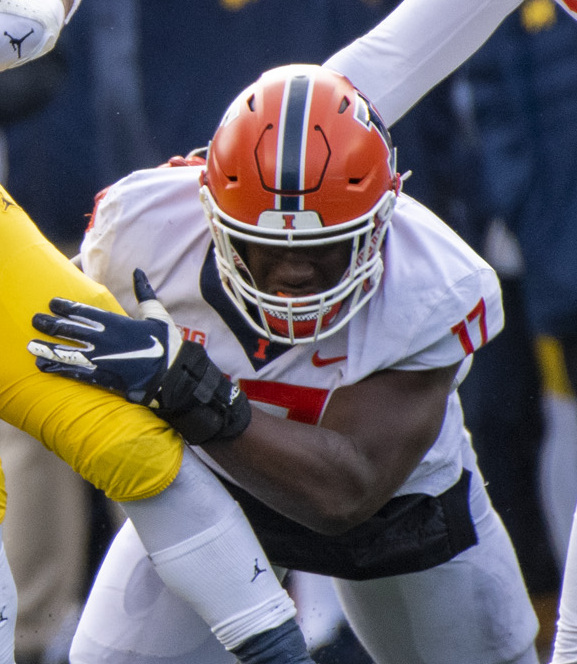
- Jacas with Illinois in 2022

No. 50 – New England Patriots
- Position: Outside linebacker
- Roster status: Active

Personal information
- Born: May 27, 2004 (age 22)
- Listed height: 6 ft 4 in (1.93 m)
- Listed weight: 261 lb (118 kg)

Career information
- High school: Fort Pierce Central (Fort Pierce, Florida)
- College: Illinois (2022–2025)
- NFL draft: 2026: 2nd round, 55th overall pick

Career history
- New England Patriots (2026–present)

Awards and highlights
- Third-team All-American (2024); First-team All-Big Ten (2025); Freshman All-American (2022)

Career NFL statistics as of Week 7, 2026
- Total tackles: 21
- Sacks: 1.5
- Pass deflections: 1
- Interceptions: 1
- Stats at Pro Football Reference

Gabriel Jacas (ACK-iss; born May 27, 2004) is an American professional football outside linebacker for the New England Patriots of the National Football League (NFL). He played college football for the Illinois Fighting Illini and was selected by the Patriots in the second round of the 2026 NFL draft.

== Early life ==
Jacas grew up in Port St. Lucie, Florida, and attended Fort Pierce Central High School. In addition to playing football, he won two state titles in wrestling. Jacas was rated a three-star recruit and originally committed to play college football at Tulane during the summer before his senior year. He later flipped his commitment to Illinois after coach Bret Bielema received a tip from an area scout and offered him a scholarship.

== College career ==
Jacas was named a starter at outside linebacker entering his freshman season with the Illinois Fighting Illini.

== Professional career ==
Pre-draft measurables
Height	Weight	Arm length	Hand span	Wingspan	40-yard dash	10-yard split	20-yard split	Bench press
6 ft 3 5/8 in (1.92 m)	260 lb (118 kg)	33 in (0.84 m)	10 in (0.25 m)	6 ft 6 7/8 in (2.00 m)	4.68 s	1.59 s	2.75 s	30 reps
All values from NFL Combine/Pro Day

In the 2026 NFL draft, Jacas was picked 55th overall by the New England Patriots in the second round. The Patriots traded away their 63rd, 131st, and 202nd to acquire the 55th pick from the Los Angeles Chargers. On June 9, 2026, head coach Mike Vrabel announced that Jacas was recovering from an arthroscopic knee procedure he underwent shortly after the draft. Jacas signed a four–year, $8.6 million contract with New England on July 25; he was the last second–round pick of the 2026 NFL draft to sign his rookie contract.

In Week 1 against the Seattle Seahawks, Jacas recorded three tackles and first ever NFL sack on Drew Lock in the 10–13 loss. In Week 2 against the Pittsburgh Steelers, Jacas recorded his first ever interception at any level off of Aaron Rodgers to go with three tackles in the 20–3 win.
