= St. Lucie West K-8 =

St. Lucie West K-8 School

Location
- Florida; United States
- 27°17′43″N 80°22′42″W

Information
- School type: public, K-8 school
- Founded: 1998
- Status: The oldest K-8 school physically located in Port St. Lucie is St. Lucie West K-8, which was founded in 1998. Before the 1990s, the school district primarily operated under a traditional Elementary (K-5) and Middle (6-8) model. The K-8 "neighborhood school" concept was introduced to Port St. Lucie as part of the rapid development of the St. Lucie West and Tradition areas.
- School district: St. Lucie County Public Schools
- Principal: Principal Joseph Lezeau
- Grades: K—8
- Gender: co-ed
- Colors: Blue, Silver and Black
- Mascot: Shark
- Website: School Website

St. Lucie West K-8 is a K-8 school located in Port St. Lucie, Florida. The school mascot is a shark. The district is the St. Lucie County Public Schools. The school was built and founded in 1998. It offers grades Kindergarten to 8th Grade.
