= Veterans Memorial Park (Port St. Lucie, Florida) =

Memorial site in Port St. Lucie, Florida, United States

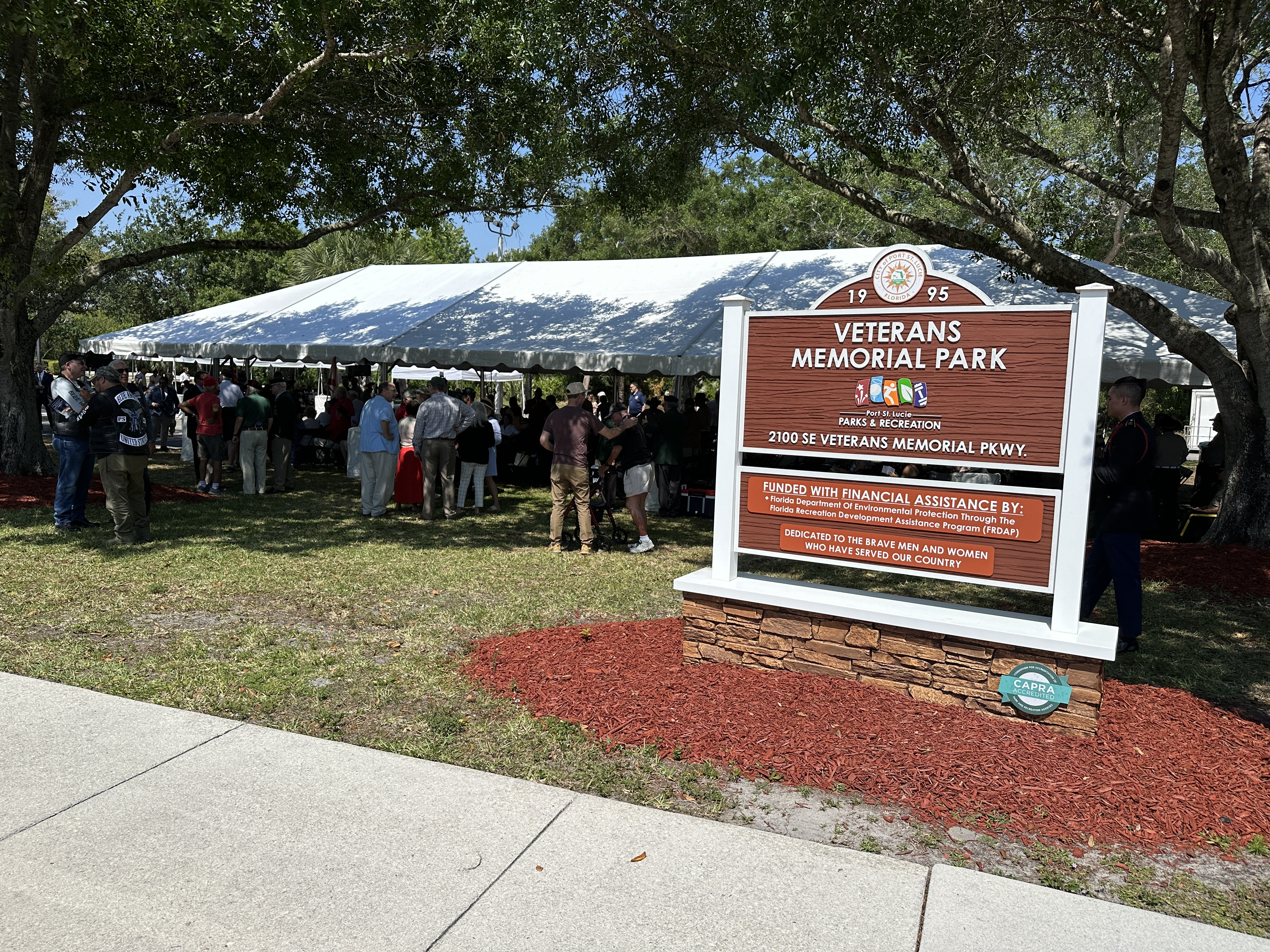
- Veterans Memorial Park
- Interactive map of Veterans Memorial Park
- Type: Public park
- Location: 2100 Southeast Veterans Memorial Parkway; Port St. Lucie, Florida
- Coordinates: 27°16′41″N 80°19′08″W
- Area: 2.5 acres (1.0 ha)
- Created: 1995
- Operator: City of Port St. Lucie
- Open: Year round
- Status: Open

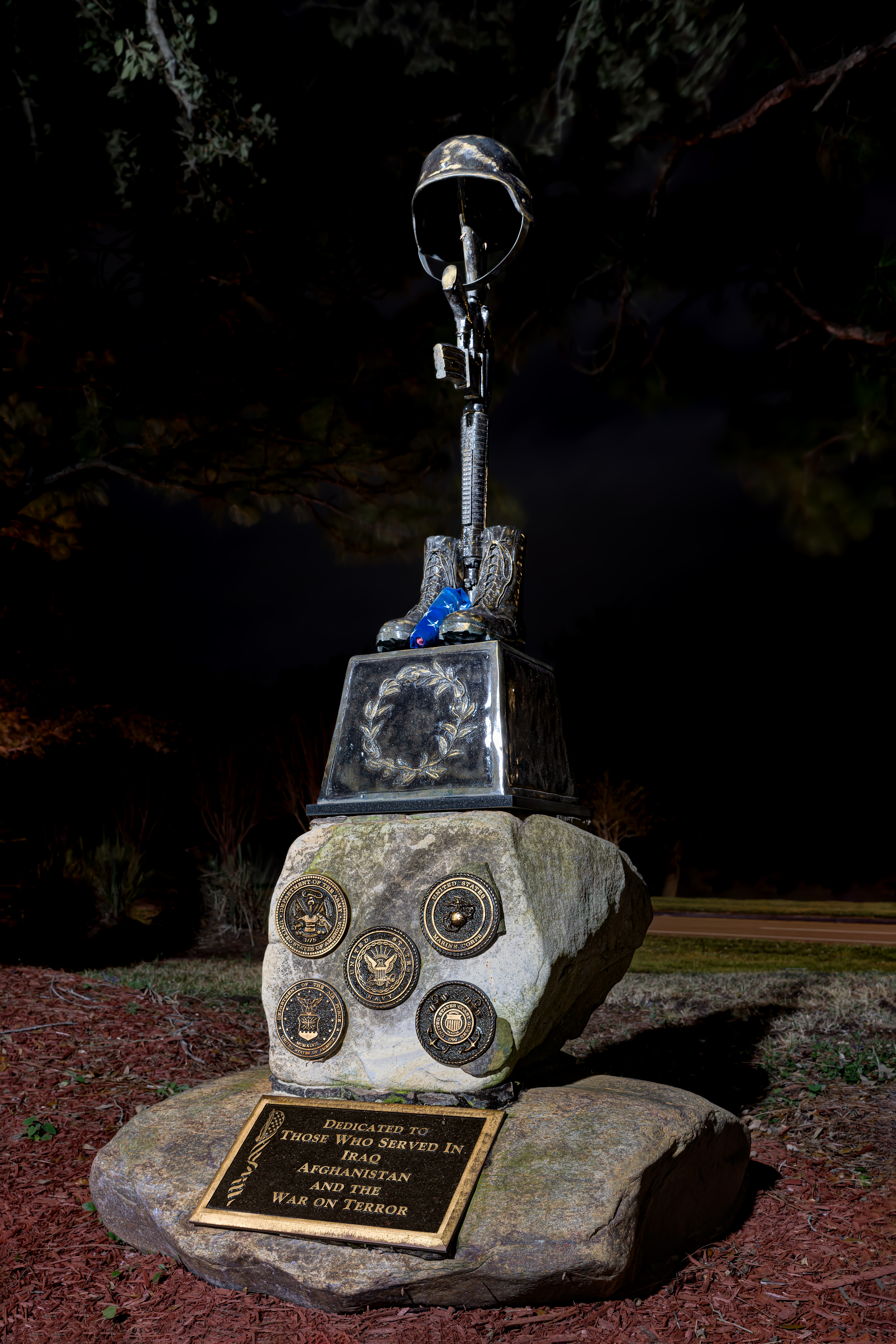
Veterans Memorial Park, Port St. Lucie

Veterans Memorial Park is a 2.5-acre (1.0 ha) park in Port St. Lucie, Florida, United States. It has memorials to the military services, war veterans, and wars.

== History ==
The park was opened in 1995 and is laid out in the shape of a pentagon.

== Events ==
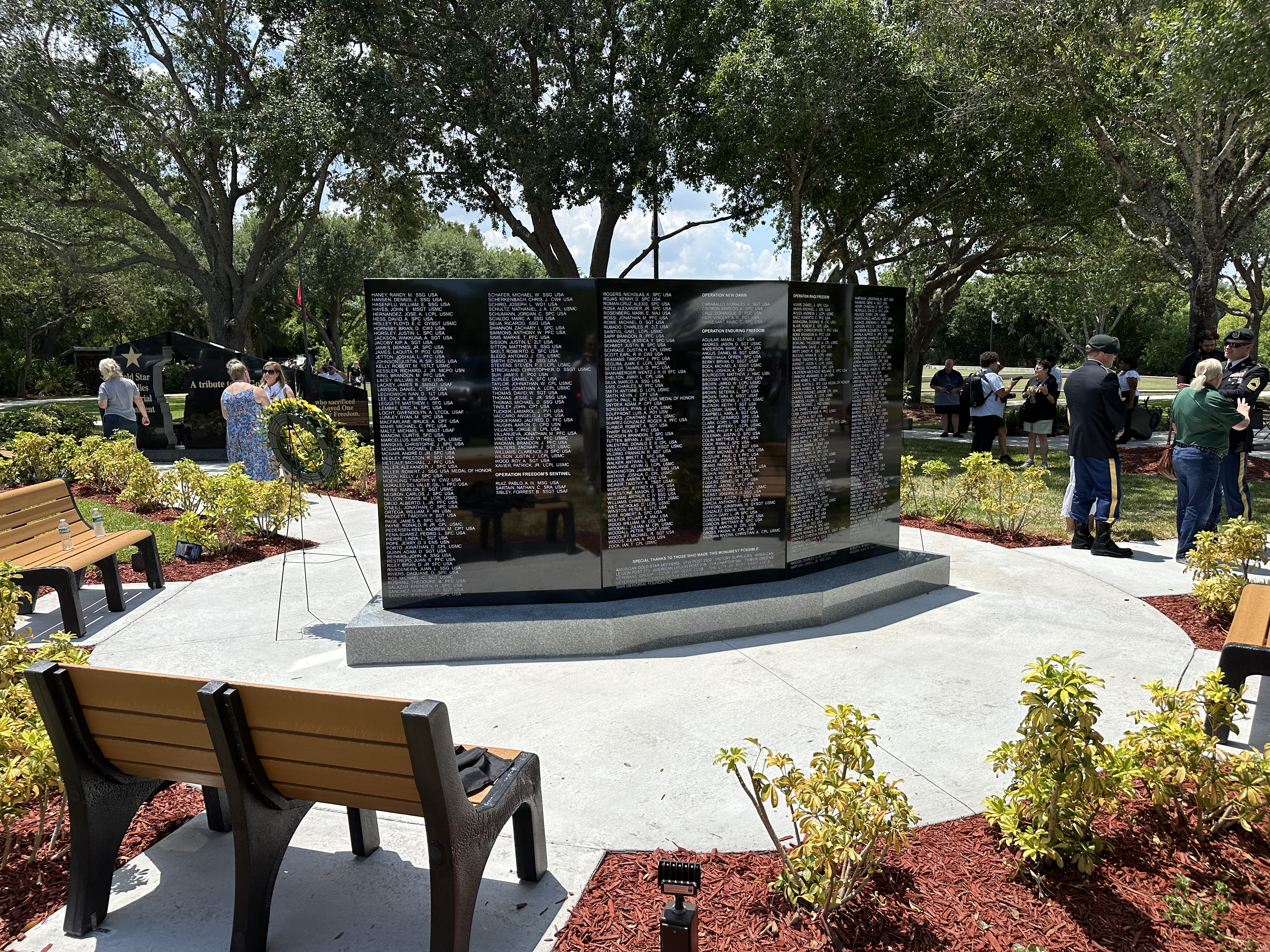
Iraq and Afghanistan War Memorial of Florida during the dedication ceremony

On September 25, 2016, the Gold Star Families Memorial Monument was dedicated at the park. A "Gold Star" is a type of service flag that family members of those who died while serving in the United States Armed Forces can display.

On April 20, 2024, the City of Port St. Lucie hosted a dedication ceremony and unveiling of the Iraq and Afghanistan War Memorial of Florida.
