= Donald De La Haye =

American football player (born 1996)

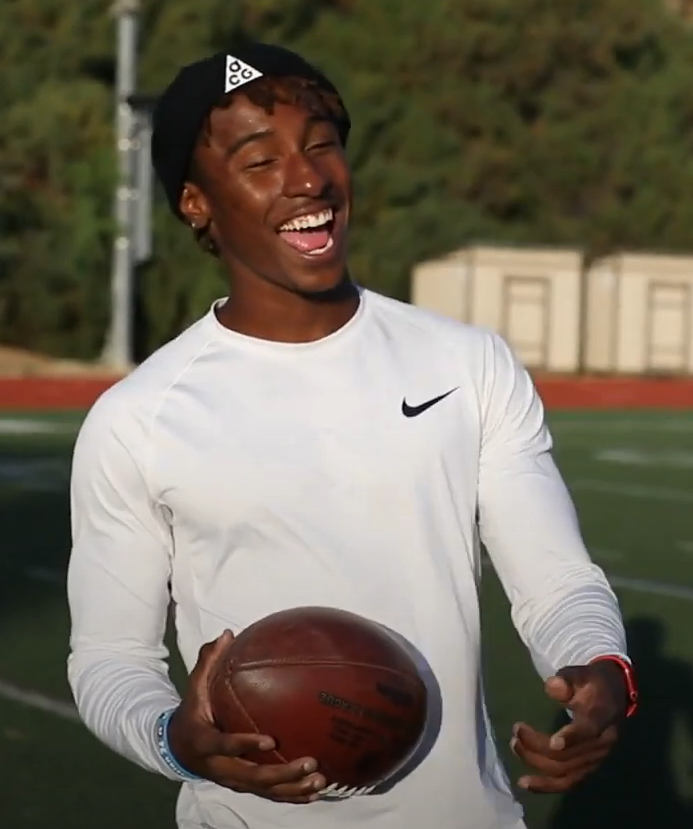
- De La Haye in 2020

No. 19, 11
- Position: Placekicker

Personal information
- Born: December 2, 1996 (age 29); Limón, Costa Rica
- Listed height: 5 ft 9 in (1.75 m)
- Listed weight: 185 lb (84 kg)

Career information
- High school: Port St. Lucie (Port St. Lucie, Florida, U.S.)
- College: UCF (2015–2016)

Career history

Playing
- Toronto Argonauts (2019)*; San Antonio Brahmas (2024–2025)
- * Offseason or practice squad member only

Operations
- FCF Glacier Boyz (2022) (Owner)

Career UFL statistics as of Week 3, 2025
- Field goals made: 5
- Field goal attempts: 7
- Field goal %: 71.4
- Points scored: 15
- Longest field goal: 55
- Touchbacks: 0
- Tackles: 1
- Stats at CFL.ca

Deestroying

YouTube information
- Channel: Deestroying
- Years active: 2015–present
- Genres: Sports; comedy; vlog
- Subscribers: 6.37 million
- Views: 1.66 billion
- Last updated: December 7, 2025

Donald De La Haye (born December 2, 1996), also known online as Deestroying, is a Costa Rican-American YouTuber and professional American football kicker. He played college football at the University of Central Florida (UCF).

De La Haye is known for his videos demonstrating his kicking ability as well as his sports-related skits and vlogs discussing his life journey. He initially received public attention while in college when the NCAA controversially banned him for profiting off his name and YouTube videos. Despite the setback, De La Haye focused on his channel and has amassed over 6 million subscribers and formed numerous partnerships. His case was one of several that sparked reform for student athlete compensation. He eventually received opportunities to play professionally with the Toronto Argonauts of the Canadian Football League (CFL) and the San Antonio Brahmas of the United Football League (UFL).

== Early life and college ==
De La Haye traveled with his family from Costa Rica to the United States at the age of seven, spending the rest of his youth in Port St. Lucie, Florida. He played for the football team at the University of Central Florida as their kickoff specialist and holder from 2015 to 2016. He was backup placekicker behind Matthew Wright and De La Haye also played some wide receiver. De La Haye was a marketing major at UCF.

=== Loss of NCAA eligibility over YouTube channel ===
In 2017, De La Haye drew attention when the NCAA told him to delete or demonetize his YouTube channel, which would have required him to remove his likeness and name from his videos if he decided to continue the channel. Faced with this dilemma, De La Haye ultimately chose to continue his channel normally, at the cost of his scholarship and NCAA eligibility. De La Haye sued UCF over this matter in July 2018, settling in November 2018 to finish his education there. Since then, he has made amends with UCF, attending multiple games with on-field passes and posting footage of himself at games. Additionally, coach Gus Malzahn and his coaching staff have invited him to multiple football-related events.

De La Haye's case has been one of several major incidents in which NCAA athletes are barred from profiting off their names, images, and likenesses (NIL) and allowing student athlete compensation. Legislation has since been issued in a few states, including California and De La Haye's home state of Florida, in an attempt to allow student athletes to profit while in school.

== YouTube career ==
While removed from the active UCF football team roster, De La Haye put more focus on his Deestroying YouTube channel, which he started as a teenager in 2015. Evolving from skits on football stereotypes and kicker trick shot videos, the channel has also featured gaming videos, skits impersonating National Football League players such as Odell Beckham Jr., Tom Brady and JuJu Smith-Schuster, actual collaborations with players such as Smith-Schuster, Marquette King, Cam Newton, Antonio Brown, and Tyreek Hill and partnerships with the NFL, its individual teams, and other sports organizations to create content. The channel has since surpassed 6.5 million subscribers after having just 94,000 when De La Haye left UCF.

De La Haye has also collaborated with other YouTube personalities such as Logan Paul, competing in the latter's "Challenger Games" in July 2019.

== Professional football career ==
=== Toronto Argonauts ===
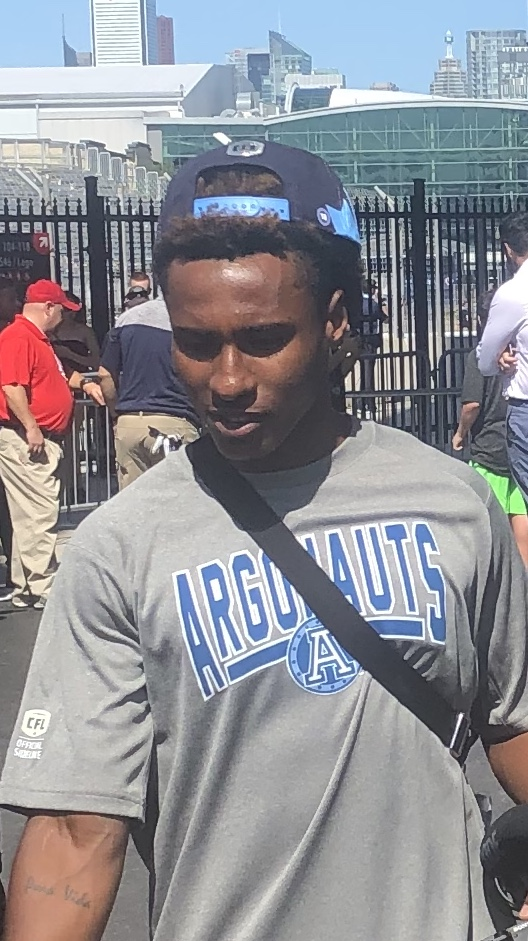
De La Haye with the Argonauts in 2019

After years of advocating for an NFL team to sign him through his videos, De La Haye was signed by the Toronto Argonauts of the Canadian Football League on May 19, 2019. The signing resulted in over 15,000 new followers on the Argonauts' official Instagram account. He appeared in both preseason games, making his one field goal attempt from a distance of 16 yards, and recording one punt for 46 yards. De La Haye was signed to the practice roster to begin the season. Due to limits on American players allowed on the roster, the Argonauts later placed De La Haye on the Suspended list in order to allow him to be free of team obligations and continue to upload videos consistently, which, according to De La Haye, generated more income than being on the practice squad.

De La Haye continued making YouTube videos that display him practicing kicks, in the ultimate goal of making the NFL. In 2021, De La Haye posted a video in which he was invited to work out for the NFL Scouting Combine. De La Haye also won the Kohls Pro Combine kickoff competition in 2021.

=== San Antonio Brahmas ===
On January 30, 2024, De La Haye was signed by the San Antonio Brahmas of the United Football League, replacing John Parker Romo, who had declined to return to the Brahmas after a successful 2023 season. De La Haye faced an open competition with Matt Ammendola for the position. On March 10, 2024, the Brahmas released Ammendola, designating De La Haye as their starting kicker for the 2024 season.

De La Haye led the UFL in kickoff yardage in his opening week of play. He was effectively a kickoff specialist for his first two games of the season, as the Brahmas did not attempt any field goals in those games and the league does not allow kicking for extra points. He was placed on injured reserve on April 8, 2024, following multiple neck fractures he sustained making a tackle on a kickoff return.

On October 29, 2024, De La Haye re-signed with the Brahmas, stating that "I refuse to go out like that (...) the story is far from over and I have a lot more football to play.

De La Haye attempted and made his first field goal since high school during the Brahmas' 2025 season opener against the Arlington Renegades, drilling a 39-yard kick to score San Antonio's first points of the season.

During Week 3 of the season against the Michigan Panthers, De La Haye went 3/4 on field goals in the 23-26 loss. De La Haye made a career-long 55-yarder, but missed a 53-yarder in the 4th quarter which would have sent the game to overtime. Shortly afterwards, it was revealed that De La Haye had suffered a groin injury, ruling him out for several weeks.

== UFL career statistics ==
Year	Team	GP	FGs				Kickoffs				Points
Year	Team	GP	Lng	FGM	FGA	Pct	KO	Yds	Avg	TB	Points
2024	SA	2	—	—	—	—	8	546	68.3	0	0
2025	SA	3	55	5	7	71.4	4	262	65.5	0	15
Career		5	55	5	7	71.4	12	808	66.9	0	15

== Esports career ==
In April 2022, De La Haye signed with FaZe Clan. He played in a flag football game with FaZe Clan in the 2022 Pro Bowl.

== Other ventures ==
De La Haye was also a co-owner of the FCF Glacier Boyz of Fan Controlled Football, along with Quavo, Richard Sherman, and Adin Ross.
