= Fabrizio Scaccia =

American football player (born 1984)

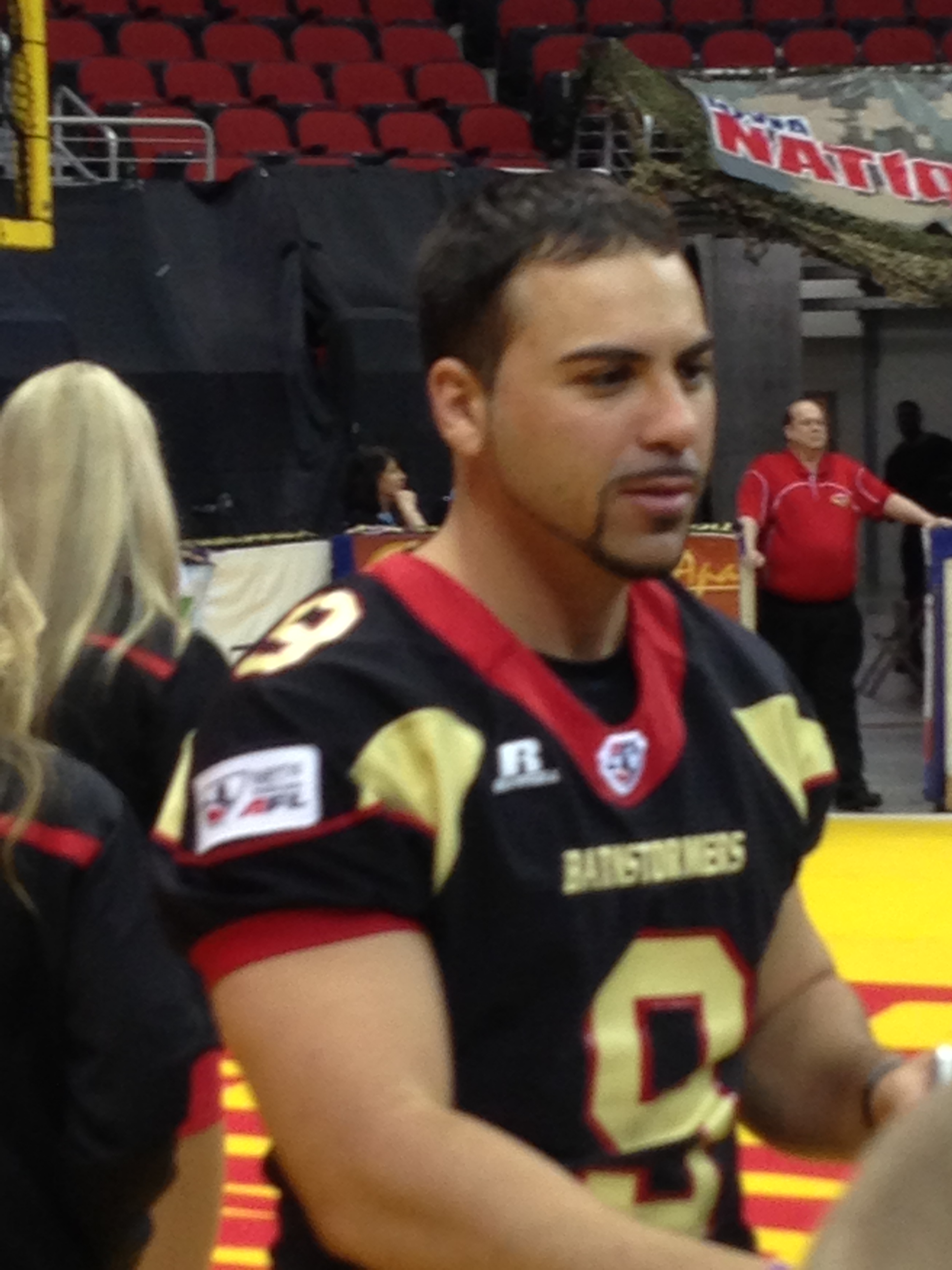
- Scaccia with the Iowa Barnstormers in 2013

No. 7, 17, 9
- Position: Placekicker

Personal information
- Born: August 21, 1984 (age 42); Oceanside, New York, U.S.
- Listed height: 6 ft 1 in (1.85 m)
- Listed weight: 205 lb (93 kg)

Career information
- High school: Port St. Lucie (FL) West Centennial
- NFL draft: 2010: undrafted

Career history
- Arizona Rattlers (2010); Sacramento Mountain Lions (2010); San Francisco 49ers (2010)*; Arizona Rattlers (2011); San Francisco 49ers (2011)*; Sacramento Mountain Lions (2011); Philadelphia Soul (2012); Sacramento Mountain Lions (2012); Arizona Rattlers (2013)*; Iowa Barnstormers (2013); Jacksonville Sharks (2014–2015); Arizona Rattlers (2015)
- * Offseason or practice squad member only

Awards and highlights
- Second-team All-Arena (2011)

Career AFL statistics
- FG made: 6
- FG att: 30
- PAT made: 395
- PAT att: 465
- Stats at ArenaFan.com
- Stats at Pro Football Reference

Fabrizio Scaccia (born August 21, 1984) is an American former professional football placekicker. He was signed by the Arizona Rattlers of the Arena Football League (AFL) as a street free agent in 2010. He attended Indian River State College, a school that did not have a football team, so he joined semi-pro football.

He was also a member of the San Francisco 49ers of the National Football League (NFL), the Sacramento Mountain Lions of the United Football League (UFL), and the Philadelphia Soul, Iowa Barnstormers, and Jacksonville Sharks of the AFL.

== Early life ==
Scaccia was a dual sport letterman in football and soccer for four years (2000–2003) at St. Lucie West Centennial High School in Port St. Lucie, Florida.

In soccer, as a 4 year varsity starter, Scaccia broke many area records and holds his high school record for most goals in a season and most goals in a single game (6).

In football, he earned first-team all-state honors which included playing in the state's Outback Bowl as a senior, where he kicked a 51-yard field goal that broke the school's distance record (previously held by his older brother Massimo), and set another record with 35 of 38 kickoffs recorded as touchbacks. In soccer, he was named first-team All-American.

After graduating high school, Scaccia received a football scholarship offer from the University of South Carolina, but turned it down after his mother was in a serious car accident and required his care.

== Semi-pro career ==
=== Fort Pierce Fire ===
From 2005 to 2007, Scaccia played with the Fort Pierce Fire in the South States Football League (SSFL) as their starting placekicker and punter.

=== Treasure Coast Bobcats ===
He played for the Treasure Coast Bobcats of the Florida Football Alliance (FFA) from 2007 to 2009. On March 29, 2009, Scaccia kicked a 68-yard field goal, which tied him for the second-longest kick of all-time and the longest ever without the use of a kicking tee. Scaccia also made field goals from 66 yards and 62 yards (62 wiped out by penalty) in 2009.

He was National Minor League Player of the Year, an All-Star team selection for the FFA both seasons, and was elected to the Minor League Hall of Fame.

== Professional career ==
=== First stint with Rattlers ===
Scaccia played for the Arizona Rattlers of the Arena Football League (AFL) from February to July 2010, where he made 90% of his placekicks.

=== First stint with Mountain Lions ===
Scaccia was invited to an open tryout for the United Football League (UFL) in Las Vegas and was ultimately signed by the Sacramento Mountain Lions. He was named Special Teams Player of the Week on September 29 and again on November 9. Scaccia also tied the UFL's field goal distance record of 54 yards (shared with Florida Tuskers kicker Nick Novak) in a game against Florida on September 25, 2010.

Scaccia kicked in eight games for the Mountain Lions and was 17-for-17 on points after touchdown and was 12 of 16 on field goals with his shortest miss being 48 yards. He was nominated for Special Teams Player of the Year and was third overall in UFL scoring for the 2010 season.

=== San Francisco 49ers and second stint with Rattlers ===
On December 21, 2010, Scaccia was invited to a tryout with the San Francisco 49ers in the National Football League (NFL) and was signed to the practice squad immediately. He spent the last two weeks of the season on the 49ers' practice squad, and was re-signed to a future contract on January 5, 2011 for the 2011–2012 seasons.

Because of the 2011 NFL lockout, Scaccia was able to re-sign with the Arizona Rattlers of the Arena Football League on April 14, 2011, with the 49ers still holding his rights in the NFL. Scaccia earned second-team All-Arena honors, was 91% on extra points, and hit a 57-yard field goal vs. the Utah Blaze.

Scaccia was released by the 49ers on August 22, 2011.

=== Second stint with the Mountain Lions ===
After returning to the Mountain Lions in 2011, Scaccia was waived on October 4; he had attempted four field goals in the two games he played, missing twice, including a key 39-yard attempt.

=== Philadelphia Soul ===
On August 1, 2012, Scaccia was assigned to the AFL's Philadelphia Soul during the playoffs.

=== Third stint with Mountain Lions ===
Scaccia was re-signed by the Mountain Lions for the 2012 season. Scaccia broke his own UFL record with a 59-yard kick in the October 10 game against the Las Vegas Locomotives at Raley Field. He went 8 for 11 on field goal attempts with his 3 misses coming from over 50 yards (54,54,53)

=== Third stint with Rattlers ===
Scaccia was assigned to the Rattlers on March 8, 2013, but placed on reassignment the next day.

=== Iowa Barnstormers ===
Scaccia spent the 2013 season with the Iowa Barnstormers of the AFL connecting on 53 of 57 extra point attempts (93%) and was named to the 2nd team All-Arena.

=== Jacksonville Sharks ===
On October 4, 2013, Scaccia was assigned to the Jacksonville Sharks. He was placed on reassignment on April 6, 2015.

=== Fourth stint with Rattlers ===
On April 16, 2015, Scaccia was assigned to the Rattlers.
