= Alonzo Mitz =

American football player (born 1963)

No. 61, 99
- Positions: Linebacker, defensive end

Personal information
- Born: June 5, 1963 (age 63); Henderson, North Carolina, U.S.
- Listed height: 6 ft 3 in (1.91 m)
- Listed weight: 275 lb (125 kg)

Career information
- High school: Fort Pierce Central (Fort Pierce, Florida)
- College: Florida
- NFL draft: 1986: 8th round, 211th overall pick

Career history
- Seattle Seahawks (1986–1989); Washington Redskins (1990)*; Cincinnati Bengals (1991–1992)
- * Offseason or practice squad member only

Career NFL statistics
- Sacks: 8
- Fumble recoveries: 3
- Interceptions: 2
- Stats at Pro Football Reference

Alonzo Loqwone Mitz (born June 5, 1963) is an American former professional football player who was a defensive end for seven seasons in the National Football League (NFL) during the 1980s and early 1990s. Mitz played college football for the Florida Gators, and thereafter, played in the NFL for the Seattle Seahawks and the Cincinnati Bengals.

== Early life ==
Mitz was born in Henderson, North Carolina, in 1963. He attended Fort Pierce Central High School in Fort Pierce, Florida, and played high school football for the Fort Pierce Central Cobras.

== College career ==
Mitz attended the University of Florida in Gainesville, Florida, where he played for coach Charley Pell and coach Galen Hall's Gators teams from 1982 to 1985.

== Professional career ==
Mitz was selected by the Seattle Seahawks in the eighth round (211th pick overall) of the 1986 NFL draft. He played for the Seahawks from 1986 to 1989. He played the last two seasons of his NFL career for the Cincinnati Bengals in 1990 and 1991. During his six-season NFL career, he played in seventy-one games, started thirty-four of them, and compiled eight quarterback sacks and two interceptions.

== See also ==
- Florida Gators football, 1980–89
- History of the Cincinnati Bengals
- List of Florida Gators in the NFL draft
- List of Seattle Seahawks players
