= St. Lucie West Centennial High School =

Location
- 1485 Southwest Cashmere Boulevard; Port St. Lucie, Florida 34986; United States; 27°17′53″N 80°22′58″W

Information
- Type: Public high school
- School district: St. Lucie County School District
- Principal: Ayesha Boria
- Faculty: 111.89 FTEs
- Enrollment: 2,766 (as of 2022-23)
- Student to teacher ratio: 24.72
- Colors: Red; Blue; Silver
- Nickname: Eagles
- Website: School website

St. Lucie West Centennial High School is a public high school in Port St. Lucie, Florida, United States, serving students in ninth through twelfth grades.

As of the 2014–15 school year, the school had an enrollment of 2,502 students and 125.0 classroom teachers (on an FTE basis), for a student–teacher ratio of 20.0:1. There were 1,181 students (47.2% of enrollment) eligible for free lunch and 171 (6.8% of students) eligible for reduced-cost lunch.

== Sports ==
Sports offered at Centennial include:

- Baseball (boys)
- Basketball (girls and boys)
- Bowling
  - State Championship in Girls' Bowling 2008
- Cheerleading (sideline and competitive)
- Eagle Music Department (Chorus, Concert Band, and Marching Band)
- Cross Country
- Flag Football
- Football (boys)
- Golf (girls and boys)
- Soccer (girls and boys)
- Softball (girls)
- Swimming
- Tennis
- Track
- Volleyball (girls)
- Wrestling (boys)
- NJROTC

== Notable alumni ==
Notable people who attended the school include:

- Jamar Chaney (born 1986), former NFL linebacker
- Megan Fox (born 1986), actress (Junior year; did not graduate from WCHS)
- Justin James (born 1997), basketball player in theIsraeli Basketball Premier League
- Omar Mateen (1986–2016), Islamic terrorist, mass murderer, and perpetrator of the Orlando nightclub shooting
- Fabrizio Scaccia (born 1984), former Arena Football League placekicker
