= Craig Swoope =

American football player (born 1964)

No. 41, 26
- Position: Safety

Personal information
- Born: February 3, 1964 (age 62); Fort Pierce, Florida, U.S.
- Listed height: 6 ft 1 in (1.85 m)
- Listed weight: 205 lb (93 kg)

Career information
- High school: Westwood (Fort Pierce)
- College: Illinois
- NFL draft: 1986: 4th round, 83rd overall pick

Career history
- Tampa Bay Buccaneers (1986–1987); Indianapolis Colts (1987-1988); San Francisco 49ers (1990)*
- * Offseason or practice squad member only

Awards and highlights
- First-team All-American (1983); First-team All-Big Ten (1983); 3× Second-team All-Big Ten (1982, 1984, 1985)

Career NFL statistics
- Interceptions: 1
- Fumble recoveries: 3
- Sacks: 2
- Stats at Pro Football Reference

Craig Avery Swoope (born February 3, 1964) is an American former professional football player who was a defensive back in the National Football League (NFL).

Born and raised in Fort Pierce, Florida Swoope played scholastically at Westwood High School. In 2008, his number 20 jersey was retired, together with Ryan McNeil's number 6 jersey, by Westwood.

Swoope played collegiately for the University of Illinois, where he was a four-time All-Big Ten selection for the Fighting Illini. As a sophomore, he was honored by the Newspaper Enterprise Association as a first-team All-American. As of 2009 he is third all-time on Illinois' career interceptions list.

Swoope was selected in the fourth round of the 1986 NFL draft by the Tampa Bay Buccaneers. He began his rookie season as the Buccaneers' starter at strong safety, and was named to the Football Digest all-rookie team. Injuries limited his playing time late in the season, and he was moved to free safety the next year. He was placed on the injured reserve list without playing a game the next season, and was later waived from the injured reserve list.

Signed by the Colts, he earned the starting job in the 1988 preseason, but dislocated an elbow in the season opener and missed four weeks of play. He lost his starting job on returning to the roster, but regained it after an injury to Freddie Robinson. Swoope recorded a career-high 11 tackles in the game in which Robinson was injured. Swoope's reckless, aggressive playing style is considered to have been responsible for the injuries that shortened his playing career. He was cut by the Colts at the end of the 1989 preseason.
