= Albert Wilson (American football) =

American football player (born 1992)

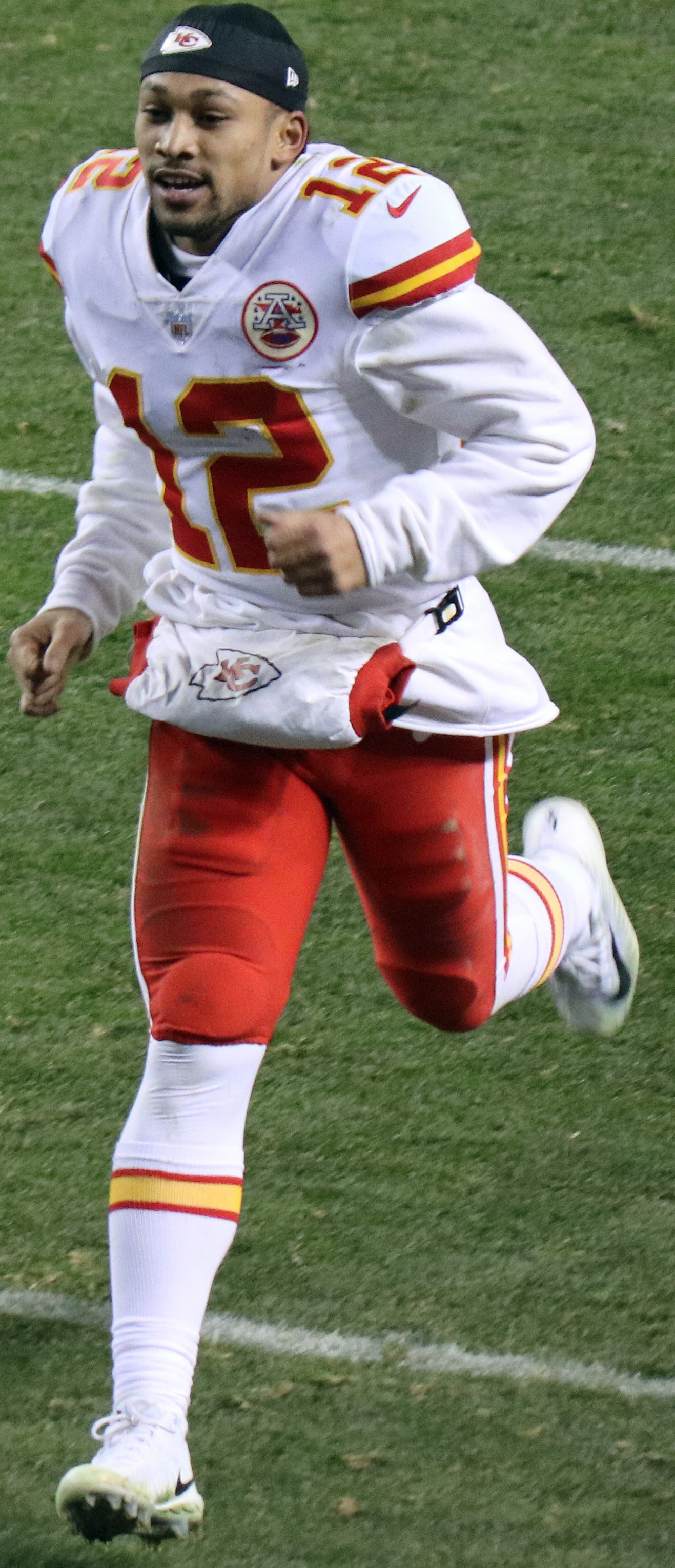
- Wilson with the Kansas City Chiefs in 2017

No. 12, 15, 2
- Position: Wide receiver

Personal information
- Born: July 12, 1992 (age 34); Fort Pierce, Florida, U.S.
- Listed height: 5 ft 9 in (1.75 m)
- Listed weight: 195 lb (88 kg)

Career information
- High school: Port St. Lucie (Port St. Lucie, Florida)
- College: Georgia State (2010–2013)
- NFL draft: 2014: undrafted

Career history
- Kansas City Chiefs (2014–2017); Miami Dolphins (2018–2021); Minnesota Vikings (2022)*; Las Vegas Raiders (2022)
- * Offseason or practice squad member only

Awards and highlights
- First-team All-Sun Belt (2013)

Career NFL statistics
- Receptions: 218
- Receiving yards: 2,499
- Receiving touchdowns: 12
- Rushing yards: 160
- Rushing touchdowns: 1
- Return yards: 54
- Stats at Pro Football Reference

Albert Wilson II (born July 12, 1992) is an American former professional football player who was a wide receiver in the National Football League (NFL) for the Kansas City Chiefs and Miami Dolphins. He played college football for the Georgia State Panthers. He holds several Georgia State records, including most touchdown receptions, longest pass play, and longest punt return.

== Early life ==
Wilson was born in Fort Pierce, Florida to an African-American father and Samoan mother. Because his parents served time in prison, Wilson grew up in foster care. In tenth grade, he was adopted by Brian and Rose Bailey of Port St. Lucie, Florida. After his parents were released from prison, Wilson moved in with a cousin who lived in Port St. Lucie so that he could stay in his high school.

Wilson played quarterback for the Port St. Lucie High School Jaguars. He was named Scripps Treasure Coast Newspapers All-Area Offensive Player of the Year in 2010 as a senior. He recorded 2,631 all-purpose yards, and 22 touchdowns his senior year. His totals were 1,029 passing yards, nine passing touchdowns, 824 rushing yards, 11 rushing touchdowns, 81 receiving yards, 132 interception return yards and 565 return yards. Wilson also ran track for Port St. Lucie High School and competed in the 100m, 200m, 100 high hurdles where he placed in states.

== College career ==
Wilson played for the Georgia State Panthers from 2010 to 2013. He was the first Georgia State player to be invited to the NFL Combine. He had a career total of 6,235 all-purpose yards, which ranked among the top thirty in NCAA history. Wilson became the Panthers' all-time leading scorer with 26 touchdowns. He also became the leading receiver in Georgia State history after recording 175 receptions for 3,190 yards and 23 touchdowns. He set school records in kickoff returns with 95 and kickoff return yards with 2,338 and returned two kickoffs for touchdowns. Wilson also held the records for career punt returns with 41 and yards with 376. He had the longest reception (93 yards), longest run (80), longest kickoff return (100) and longest punt return (62) in school history. He earned Honorable Mention All-American honors from SI.com in 2013. Wilson also garnered First-team All-Sun Belt accolades in 2013. He was named First-team All-CAA as a kick returner and Third-team All-CAA as a wide receiver in 2012. He was also CAA Special Teams Co-Player of the Year in 2012.

== Professional career ==
Pre-draft measurables
Height	Weight	Arm length	Hand span	40-yard dash	10-yard split	20-yard split	20-yard shuttle	Three-cone drill	Vertical jump	Broad jump	Bench press
5 ft 9 3/8 in (1.76 m)	202 lb (92 kg)	30 3/8 in (0.77 m)	9 1/8 in (0.23 m)	4.43 s	1.54 s	2.60 s	4.21 s	7.00 s	37 1/2 in (0.95 m)	10 ft 3 in (3.12 m)	10 reps
All values from NFL Combine

=== Kansas City Chiefs ===
On May 11, 2014, the Kansas City Chiefs signed Wilson as an undrafted free agent after he went unselected in the 2014 NFL draft. The Chiefs signed him to a three-year, $1.54 million contract with a signing bonus of $10,000.

He made his NFL debut on September 7, 2014, against the Tennessee Titans. He recorded his first professional reception in the following game against the San Diego Chargers. Overall, in his rookie season, he finished with 16 receptions for 260 receiving yards.

Wilson finished the 2015 regular-season as the Chiefs' third-leading receiver with 35 receptions for 451 yards and 2 touchdowns. The Chiefs finished the regular season with an 11–5 record and qualified for the 2015–16 NFL playoffs. The Chiefs were eliminated by the New England Patriots in the Divisional Round. Wilson finished the playoffs with 7 receptions for 66 yards and one touchdown.

Wilson finished the 2016 regular-season with 31 receptions for 279 yards for two touchdowns and one rushing touchdown. The Chiefs finished the regular season with a 12–4 record and qualified for the 2016–17 NFL playoffs. In the Divisional Round against the Pittsburgh Steelers, he had two receptions for three yards and a touchdown in the 18–16 loss.

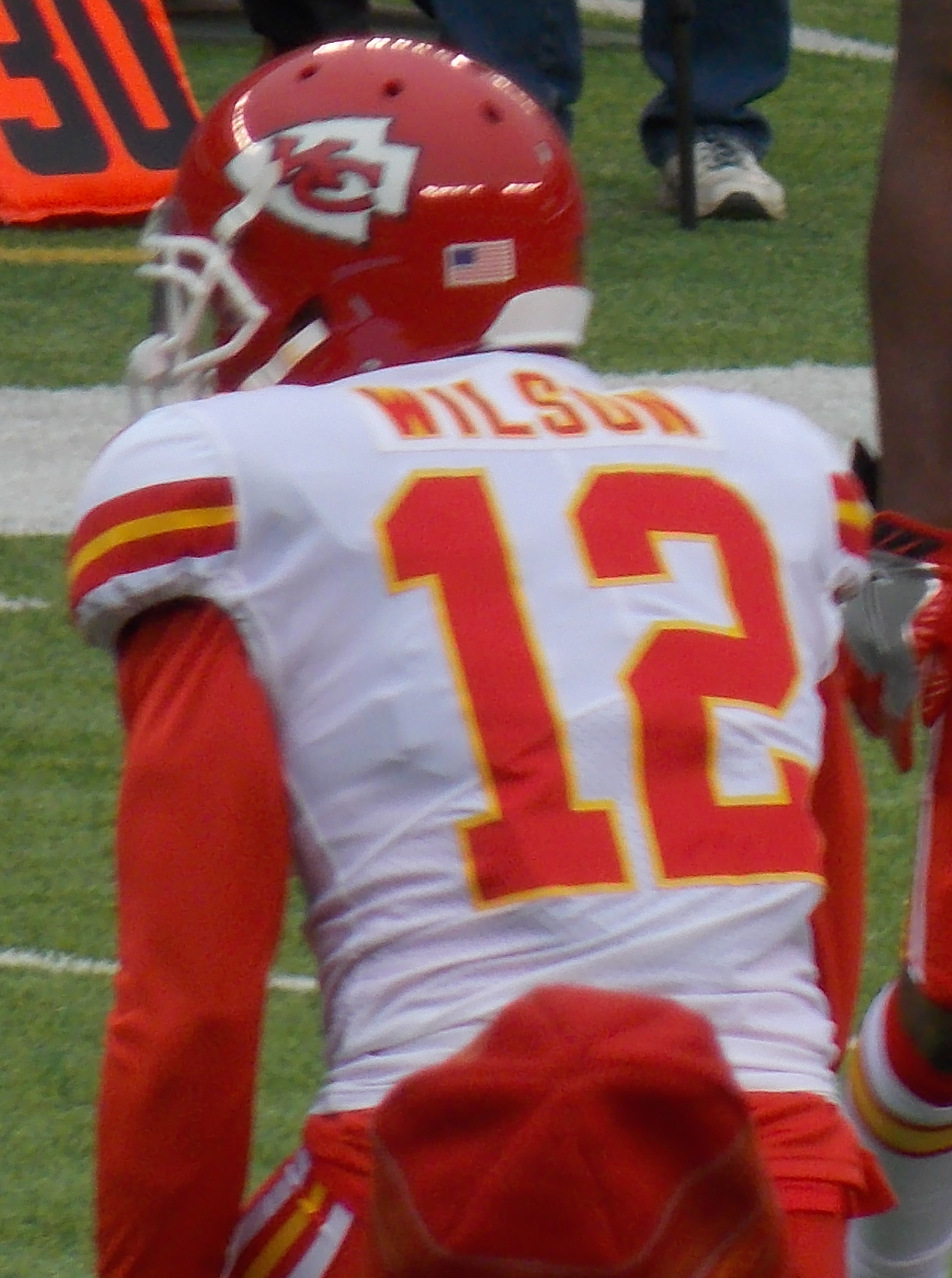
Wilson with the Chiefs in 2017

On March 9, 2017, the Chiefs signed Wilson to a one-year, $1.79 million extension. In the 2017 season, Wilson finished with 42 receptions for 554 receiving yards and three receiving touchdowns.

=== Miami Dolphins ===
On March 15, 2018, Wilson signed a three-year contract with the Miami Dolphins. In Week 3 of the 2018 season, Wilson recorded two receptions for 74 yards and threw a 52-yard touchdown pass to Jakeem Grant on a trick play in the 28–20 victory over the Oakland Raiders. In Week 6 against the Chicago Bears, Wilson recorded six catches for a career-high 155 yards and two touchdowns, earning him AFC Offensive Player of the Week. He was placed on injured reserve on October 24, 2018, after suffering a hip injury in Week 7. Overall, he finished the 2018 season with 26 receptions for 391 receiving yards and four touchdowns. In the 2019 season, Wilson finished with 43 receptions for 351 receiving yards and one receiving touchdown in 13 games, of which he started four.

On August 5, 2020, Wilson announced he would opt out of the 2020 season due to the COVID-19 pandemic.

Wilson returned for the 2021 season. He appeared in 14 games, of which he started five. He finished with 25 receptions for 213 receiving yards.

=== Minnesota Vikings ===
On June 1, 2022, Wilson signed with the Minnesota Vikings. He was released on August 22.

=== Las Vegas Raiders ===
On October 7, 2022, Wilson signed with the practice squad of the Las Vegas Raiders. and, four days later, signed to the active roster. He was released on October 22, and re-signed to the practice squad. He was released on December 28.

On May 10, 2024, Wilson announced his retirement from professional football via an Instagram post.

== NFL career statistics ==
Legend
**Bold**	Career high

=== Regular season ===
Year	Team	Games		Receiving					
Year	Team	GP	GS	Tgt	Rec	Yds	Avg	Lng	TD
2014	KC	12	2	28	16	260	**16.3**	48	0
2015	KC	14	**12**	57	35	451	12.9	44	2
2016	KC	**16**	5	51	31	279	9.0	42	2
2017	KC	13	7	**62**	42	**554**	13.2	63	3
2018	MIA	7	3	35	26	391	15.0	**75**	**4**
2019	MIA	13	4	**62**	**43**	351	8.2	35	1
2021	MIA	14	5	39	25	213	8.5	64	0
		89	38	334	218	2,499	11.5	75	12

=== Playoffs ===
Year	Team	Games		Receiving					
Year	Team	GP	GS	Tgt	Rec	Yds	Avg	Lng	TD
2015	KC	**2**	**2**	**15**	**7**	**66**	9.4	**19**	**1**
2016	KC	1	1	3	2	3	1.5	5	**1**
2017	KC	1	1	4	2	26	**13.0**	18	0
		4	4	22	11	95	8.6	19	2
