= Willie Broughton =

American football player (born 1964)

No. 68, 79, 97, 99
- Position: Defensive tackle

Personal information
- Born: September 9, 1964 (age 62); Fort Pierce, Florida, U.S.
- Listed height: 6 ft 5 in (1.96 m)
- Listed weight: 285 lb (129 kg)

Career information
- High school: Fort Pierce Central
- College: Miami (FL)
- NFL draft: 1985: 4th round, 88th overall pick

Career history
- Indianapolis Colts (1985–1987); Dallas Cowboys (1989–1990); Los Angeles Raiders (1992–1994); Miami Dolphins (1994); Los Angeles Raiders (1995)*; New Orleans Saints (1995–1996)
- * Offseason or practice squad member only

Awards and highlights
- National champion (1983)

Career NFL statistics
- Tackles: 202
- Sacks: 11
- Fumble recoveries: 1
- Stats at Pro Football Reference

Willie Lee Broughton (born September 9, 1964) is an American former professional football player who was a defensive tackle in the National Football League (NFL) for the Indianapolis Colts, Dallas Cowboys, Los Angeles Raiders, and New Orleans Saints. He played college football for the Miami Hurricanes.

== Early life ==
Broughton attended Fort Pierce Central High School. He was a two-way tackle. He received All-state honors as a senior. He also practiced track, where he was the conference's discus throw champion

He accepted a football scholarship from the University of Miami. As a junior, he was a member of the National championship squad. As a senior, he played every position along the defensive line, posting 62 tackles (6 for loss) and 5 sacks.

== Professional career ==
=== Indianapolis Colts ===
Broughton was selected by the Indianapolis Colts in the fourth round (88th overall) of the 1985 NFL draft. He was also selected by the Orlando Renegades in the 1985 USFL Territorial Draft. As a rookie, he appeared in 15 games with one start at left defensive end, making 17 tackles one sack and 2 quarterback pressures.

In 1986, he started the first 8 games at nose tackle, after the team released veteran Brad White. He was limited by a neck injury the rest of the season. He posted 34 tackles, one sack, one quarterback pressure and one fumble recovery.

In 1987, he injured a knee in training camp and was placed on the injured reserve list on August 4.

On July 5, 1988, he was signed as a free agent. He was waived on August 23.

=== Dallas Cowboys ===
In 1989, his college coach Jimmy Johnson gave him a tryout and ended up signing him on July 18. He started 14 out of 16 games, while registering 92 tackles (fifth on the team), 3 sacks and 2 passes defensed.

In 1990, he only played in 4 games as backup defensive tackle. He suffered a lower back strain before the fifth game against the Tampa Bay Buccaneers and was placed on the injured reserve list. He was cut on August 20, 1991. He was not re-signed after the season.

=== Los Angeles Raiders (first stint) ===
Broughton spent a year out of football rehabilitating his back, before being signed as a free agent by the Los Angeles Raiders in 1992. He appeared in 16 games with 8 starts at left defensive tackle. He had 42 tackles and one sack.

On August 30, 1993, he was released and re-signed the next day. He appeared in 15 games as a backup, making 4 tackles and one sack.

Broughton did not play in 1994, after being declared inactive in 9 games. He also was limited with a right elbow injury that he suffered in a preseason drill. He was released on November 14.

=== Miami Dolphins ===
On November 23, he signed as a free agent with the Miami Dolphins, after Craig Veasey was lost to injury. He was declared inactive in 5 games. He was not re-signed after the season.

=== Los Angeles Raiders (second stint) ===
On June 2, 1995, he was signed as a free agent by the Los Angeles Raiders. On August 28, he was traded to the New Orleans Saints in exchange for a draft choice (#220-Sedric Clark).

=== New Orleans Saints ===
In 1995, he appeared in 16 games with 10 starts at left defensive end and nose tackle in a 3-4 defense. He had 31 tackles, 2 sacks and one pass defensed.

In 1996, he appeared in 14 games with 5 starts at right defensive tackle, he tallied 22 tackles (16 solo) and 2 sacks. He was placed on the injured reserve list on December 19. He was cut on July 18, 1997.

== Personal life ==
His Brother Dock Luckie played nose tackle for the Winnipeg Blue Bombers of the Canadian Football League.
