= Wonder Monds =

American gridiron football player (born 1952)

No. 31, 25, 36
- Position: Defensive back

Personal information
- Born: May 3, 1952 (age 74); Fort Pierce, Florida, U.S.
- Listed height: 6 ft 3 in (1.91 m)
- Listed weight: 215 lb (98 kg)

Career information
- High school: Fort Pierce Central
- College: Indian Hills CC (1972); Nebraska (1973–1975)
- NFL draft: 1976: 4th round, 112th overall pick

Career history
- Toronto Argonauts (1976); Ottawa Rough Riders (1976–1977); San Francisco 49ers (1978); Ottawa Rough Riders (1979)

Awards and highlights
- Grey Cup champion (1976); First-team All-American (1975); First-team All-Big Eight (1975); Second-team All-Big Eight (1974)
- Stats at Pro Football Reference

Wonderful Terrific Monds Jr. (born May 3, 1952) is an American former professional football player who was a defensive back for one season with the San Francisco 49ers of the National Football League (NFL). He played college football for the Nebraska Cornhuskers, earning first-team All-American honors his senior year in 1976. He was selected by the Pittsburgh Steelers in the fourth round of the 1976 NFL draft but instead signed with the Toronto Argonauts of the Canadian Football League (CFL) after receiving a better offer. After spending the beginning of the 1976 season on the injured list, Monds was cut by Toronto and signed by the Ottawa Rough Riders. He helped the Rough Riders win the 64th Grey Cup later that year. After two years in Ottawa, he played in all 16 games for the San Francisco 49ers in 1978 as a backup defensive back. Monds rejoined the Rough Riders in 1979 and retired after the season. He was inducted into the Nebraska Football Hall of Fame in 2001. He has also attracted attention due to his unique name.

== Early life ==
Wonderful Terrific Monds Jr. was born on May 3, 1952, in Quitman, Georgia, and raised in Fort Pierce, Florida. While growing up in the projects, his family once lived in an apartment where they had to share a bathroom with neighbors. Another house they lived in was so hot during summertime that Monds had to soak his bedsheets with water.

Monds was an artist, which caused him to be called a "sissy" by other kids. He later said "I was always getting in fights to prove I wasn't a sissy. I figured if I was going to have to fight all the time I might as well play football." His mother initially did not want him to play football due to the risk of injury but later gave him permission. Monds played two years of high school football at Fort Pierce Central High School and earned all-state honors.

== College career ==
After graduating from Central High, Monds enrolled at Iowa State University to play college football for the Iowa State Cyclones. He had also received a scholarship offer from a Minnesota art school. Monds left Iowa State before ever playing for the Cyclones. After spending a year at home in Fort Pierce, Monds played football at Indian Hills Community College in 1972 as a running back. He then transferred to the University of Nebraska–Lincoln, where he was a three-year letterman on defense for the Nebraska Cornhuskers from 1973 to 1975. He played a linebacker/safety hybrid position known as "monster back" and also spent time on the kickoff coverage team. Monds grew his trademark afro while at Nebraska in order to stand out. He posted seven solo tackles and eight assisted tackles in 1973.

As a junior in 1974, Monds totaled 15 solo tackles, 16 assisted tackles, two interceptions, two pass breakups, and one fumble recovery, earning Associated Press second-team All-Big Eight honors. In 1975, he recorded 17 solo tackles, 17 assisted tackles, two pass breakups, one fumble recovery, and one blocked kick. For his performance during the 1975 season, Monds was named first-team All-Big Eight by both the AP and United Press International, and a first-team All-American by the Football Writers Association of America. He had wanted to major in art at Nebraska but his counselor advised that would take a lot of classwork and might interfere with football. He instead majored in English. Monds was inducted into the Nebraska Football Hall of Fame in 2001.

== Professional career ==
Monds was selected by the Pittsburgh Steelers in the fourth round, with the 112th overall pick, of the 1976 NFL draft. However, in late April 1976, Monds instead signed a three-year contract with the Toronto Argonauts of the Canadian Football League (CFL) because they offered him more money. The deal also included a signing bonus. Monds later stated "Goodness, it was a big helluva difference. I could have played 2.5 years or three years in the NFL and made more money than that after one year in Canada." After beginning the 1976 season on the team's disabled list, he was cut by the Argonauts in mid August.

Monds was then signed by the CFL's Ottawa Rough Riders in August 1976 after cornerback Merl Code suffered an injury. Monds dressed in nine games for Ottawa as a cornerback during the 1976 season and intercepted four passes for 58 yards. He also missed some time due to injury as the Rough Riders finished the year with a 9–6–1 record. He was activated in time for the Eastern final against the Hamilton Tiger-Cats, which Ottawa won by a score of 17–15. The Rough Riders advanced to the 64th Grey Cup, where they beat the Saskatchewan Roughriders by a margin of 23–20. Monds dressed in 15 games in 1977, recording one interception, as the team finished 8–8 and lost in the Eastern final. He did not re-sign with the Rough Riders due to a contract dispute. Monds said Ottawa did not offer him enough money because the team's general manager did not consider defensive backs skill positions.

Monds signed with the San Francisco 49ers of the NFL on June 1, 1978. He fractured his wrist in training camp. He played in all 16 games (no starts) for the 49ers during the 1978 season as a backup safety and cornerback. The 49ers finished the season with a 2–14 record. Monds was released on July 12, 1979.

On July 26, 1979, Monds was signed to a five-day trial by the Rough Riders after Kenny Downing broke a cheek bone. Monds dressed in six games for Ottawa that year and intercepted one pass. He was released in mid September, and retired from football after the 1979 season.

== Personal life ==
In 1980, Monds became an assistant football coach at his alma mater, Fort Pierce Central. At the age of 30, he fulfilled a childhood dream of his by buying his parents a house in Fort Pierce. He later worked as a school teacher, and also program supervisor at the 10th Street Recreation Center in East Stuart, Florida. Monds has four sons who became college or professional athletes: Wonderful Terrific Monds II (born 1973) who played Minor League Baseball, Mario Monds (born 1976) who played in the NFL, Devin Monds who played college baseball at Northeastern University and was selected by the Los Angeles Dodgers in the 47th round of the 2001 Major League Baseball draft, and a second son named Wonderful Terrific Monds II (born 1992) who played college football at Buffalo and FIU. His grandson, Wonderful Monds IV, is a high school football quarterback in the class of 2028.

=== Name ===
According to family lore, Monds's grandfather, who had fathered 11 daughters, had stated "Wonderful! Terrific!" after seeing his first son (Wonderful Monds Sr.). The name was then passed down to Wonderful Monds Jr. However, in 1975, Monds said "My grandfather died when I was real young and I've never really talked to my grandmother about it." Monds said he was going to visit his family in Georgia after the 1975 college football season and "find out how the hell she came about calling my father Wonderful." He was later told that a midwife who had helped his grandmother achieve a home birth said "This is wonderful." In 2004, Monds said he never found out where his middle name of "Terrific" came from but suspected that his mother came up with it.

Growing up, Monds said he was teased, and punched, by other boys for his name. He also had his shoes stolen. He said it took him a while to "get used to" his name but that he later "learned to love it", stating "It made me stronger because I've had to defend myself and my name at times." Monds also said "I used to walk down the street and somebody would say, 'I wonder if it's going to rain' and I'd look up, thinking somebody was talking to me. Anytime somebody said wonder in a sentence, I'd look around."
