= St. Lucie Public Schools =

School in Fort Pierce, Florida

Address
- 9461 Brandywine Lane Port St. Lucie, Florida, 34986; United States
- Coordinates: 27°18′45.43″N 80°25′8.2″W

District information
- Superintendent: Jon R. Prince
- NCES District ID: 1201770

Students and staff
- Enrollment: 45,661 (2022–23)
- Faculty: 2369.83 (on an FTE basis)

Other information
- Website: www.stlucie.k12.fl.us

St. Lucie Public Schools, previously known as St. Lucie County Public Schools, is the branding for St. Lucie County School District, which is the school district that manages schools in St. Lucie County, Florida, United States. As of 2023 the district employed (on an FTE basis) a total of approximately 5,400 staff, 2,400 of them teachers.

== Schools ==
=== Elementary schools ===
- Bayshore Elementary
- Chester A. Moore Elementary
- Fairlawn Elementary (Magnet school)
- Floresta Elementary
- Frances K. Sweet Elementary (Magnet school)
- Lakewood Park Elementary
- Lawnwood Elementary
- Mariposa Elementary
- Morningside Elementary
- Parkway Elementary
- Rivers Edge Elementary
- St. Lucie Elementary
- Savanna Ridge Elementary
- Village Green Environmental Studies School
- Weatherbee Elementary
- White City Elementary
- Windmill Point Elementary

=== K-8 schools ===
- Allapattah Flats K-8
- Creative Arts Academy of St. Lucie (Magnet school)
- Manatee K-8
- Northport K-8
- Oak Hammock K-8
- Palm Pointe Educational Research School at Tradition
- Samuel S. Gaines Academy of Emerging Technologies
- St. Lucie West K-8
- West Gate K-8

=== Middle schools ===
- Dan McCarty Middle School
- Forest Grove Middle
- Southern Oaks Middle
- Southport Middle school

=== High schools ===
- Fort Pierce Central High School
- Fort Pierce Westwood Academy
- Lincoln Park Academy, 6–12 (Magnet school)
- Mosaic Digital Academy Virtual School K–12
- Port St. Lucie High School
- St. Lucie West Centennial High School
- Treasure Coast High School
- Legacy High School

=== Alternative education ===
- Dale Cassens Education Complex PK–12
