= Port St. Lucie High School =

Public high school in Port St. Lucie, Florida, United States

Location
- 1201 SE Jaguar Lane; Port St. Lucie, Florida 34952; United States; 27.304942°N 80.282582°W

Information
- Type: Public
- Motto: Every Student Future Ready
- School district: St. Lucie Public Schools
- Principal: Nicole Telese
- Teaching staff: 76.52 (on an FTE basis)
- Grades: 9-12
- Enrollment: 1,748 (2022–23)
- Student to teacher ratio: 22.84
- Colors: Red; Black
- Mascot: Jaguar
- Nickname: PSL
- Website: https://schools.stlucie.k12.fl.us/phs/

Port St. Lucie High School (PSLHS) is a high school in the U.S. city of Port St. Lucie, Florida. It is located in the southeast area of St. Lucie County.

== Campus and history ==
The Port St. Lucie High School campus is square, with a central, open commons area. PSLHS also has a variety of athletic facilities, and is the only school with its own football stadium in St. Lucie County.

Port St. Lucie High School opened to grades 9-11 in August 1989 with an enrollment of approximately 1500 students; it included grades 9-12 thereafter. These students included others from Fort Pierce Central High School and Fort Pierce Westwood High School. PSLHS later became an International Baccalaureate school in December 2007, joining Lincoln Park Academy as the only schools in St. Lucie County with the program, as well as the only public school in the district with the IB Program.

During the 2011/2012 school year, roughly half of the school's portable classrooms in the rear of the school were demolished and replaced with more permanent, hybrid models. The other half were replaced during the summer of 2012 and began use with the 2012/2013 school year.

== Administration ==
- Principal - Nicole Telese

== Academics ==
All 9th grade students take part in the Jaguar Preparatory Academy. All sophomores take part in the Jaguar Lyceum. 11th and 12th graders enroll in an academy based on a career interest or specialized programs, such as the International Baccalaureate Program, Visual and Performing Arts, or Applied Sciences. In total, PSLHS offers six Advanced Placement Courses, 12 Career Academies, and several additional elective programs, as well as dual anrollment courses in association with Indian River State College.

The school cut down on its Advanced Placement options from 11 available courses in the 2012-2013 school year to 6 available AP courses in the 2013-2014 school year, to encourage enrollment in the International Baccalaureate Program. The following are still offered: American Government, Calculus, English Language & Composition, Human Geography, US History, and World History.

PSLHA offers two divisions of Career Academies:

- Visual, Performing Arts, and Technology Academy, which includes Eurhythmics (Color Guard), Instrumental & Vocal Music, Television Production, Theater, Web Design, and Visual Arts
- Applied Sciences Academy, which includes Automotive Technology, Construction Trades, Culinary Operation, and Information Technology, Health Science, International Baccalaureate, and Military Science

Freshmen and sophomores are isolated from the rest of the school in their core courses.

- Jaguar Preparatory Academy (Freshman Academy) - The academy is organized into three "teams" (Team Alpha, Team Beta, and Team Gamma) which allows the teachers to collaborate in instruction of the students. Freshmen may take English (Regular English, Pre-IB English, or 9th grade Reading), Math (Algebra 1, Geometry, and Algebra 2 with optional Honors credit), Science (Physical Science, Physical Science Honors, or Pre-IB Biology), HOPE, Freshman Seminar, and AP Human Geography.
- Jaguar Lyceum (Sophomore Academy) - The academy is also organized into "teams". Students may take English (English 2, Pre-IB English 2, or AP English and Composition), Math (Geometry, Algebra 2, Analysis of Functions, and Pre-Calculus with optional Honors credit), Science (Biology or Chemistry with optional Honors credit), and World History (Regular, AP, or Honors).

Additional elective programs include Band, Drama, Dance, Medical Skills, Spanish, and US Army JROTC.

== Extra-curricular activities ==
Established in August 1993, the Army JROTC program at Port St. Lucie High School operates as the Jaguar Battalion and has held the designation of "Honor Unit with Distinction", the highest classification awarded by United States Army JROTC. The battalion sponsors several extracurricular teams, including drill, raider, Orienteering, air rifle marksmanship, color guard, tutoring, and a parent booster organization. The drill team has participated in district, state, and national competitions.

The Port St. Lucie High School marching band, known as "The Pride of Port St. Lucie", participates in district and state evaluations conducted by the Florida Band Association District Music Performance Assessments over the past 20 years, where it has received consistent “Superior” ratings. The band has taken part in national bowl game–related events, including the 2001 Fiesta Bowl and the 2007 Orange Bowl.

== Sports ==
Port St. Lucie High School offers 24 varsity teams in 16 FHSAA-recognized sports. The Jaguars, as well as the Lady Jags, have long had success in athletics, though no PSLHS team has won a Florida High School Athletic Association (FHSAA) State Championship. The school is traditionally strong in boys' basketball, wrestling, baseball, and competitive cheerleading. Due to its high student population, PSLHS competes in the second highest FHSAA Division for most sports.

Fall sports

- Boys' & girls' bowling, boys' & girls' golf, boys' & girls' cross country, girls' volleyball, boys' & girls' swimming, football, cheerleading

Winter sports

- Boys' & girls' basketball, boys' & girls' soccer, girls' weightlifting, wrestling, co-ed competitive cheerleading

Spring sports

- Boys' & girls' track and field, boys' and girls' tennis, girls' flag football, baseball, softball, Special Olympics

Notable accomplishments

- 1997 - baseball, USA Today High School Player of the Year- Rick Ankiel
- 1998/99 - wrestling, National High School Coaches Association All-American, #8 In Nation- Hebrews Josue
- 1999 and 2007 - FHSAA Boys' Basketball "Final Four"
- 2010 and 2011 - The PSLHS Competitive Cheerleading Squad won back-to-back FHSAA State runner up titles behind the four-time defending State Champion Sebring High School.
- 2011 - competitive cheerleading - won the inaugural FHSAA Region 4 Championship (Large Co-Ed Division)
- 2010-2011 - wrestling, Class 3A District 9 Champions
- 2011-2012 - wrestling, Class 3A District 9 Champions

PSLHS consistently produces 10-15 collegiate athletes every year.

== Notable alumni ==
- Rick Ankiel - former MLB outfielder
- Jon Coutlangus - former MLB pitcher
- Donald De La Haye - UFL player, San Antonio Brahmas and YouTube personality
- Larry Sanders - professional basketball player
- Din Thomas - retired mixed martial arts fighter
- Albert Wilson - former NFL player, Miami Dolphins
