= Justin James (basketball) =

American basketball player (born 1997)

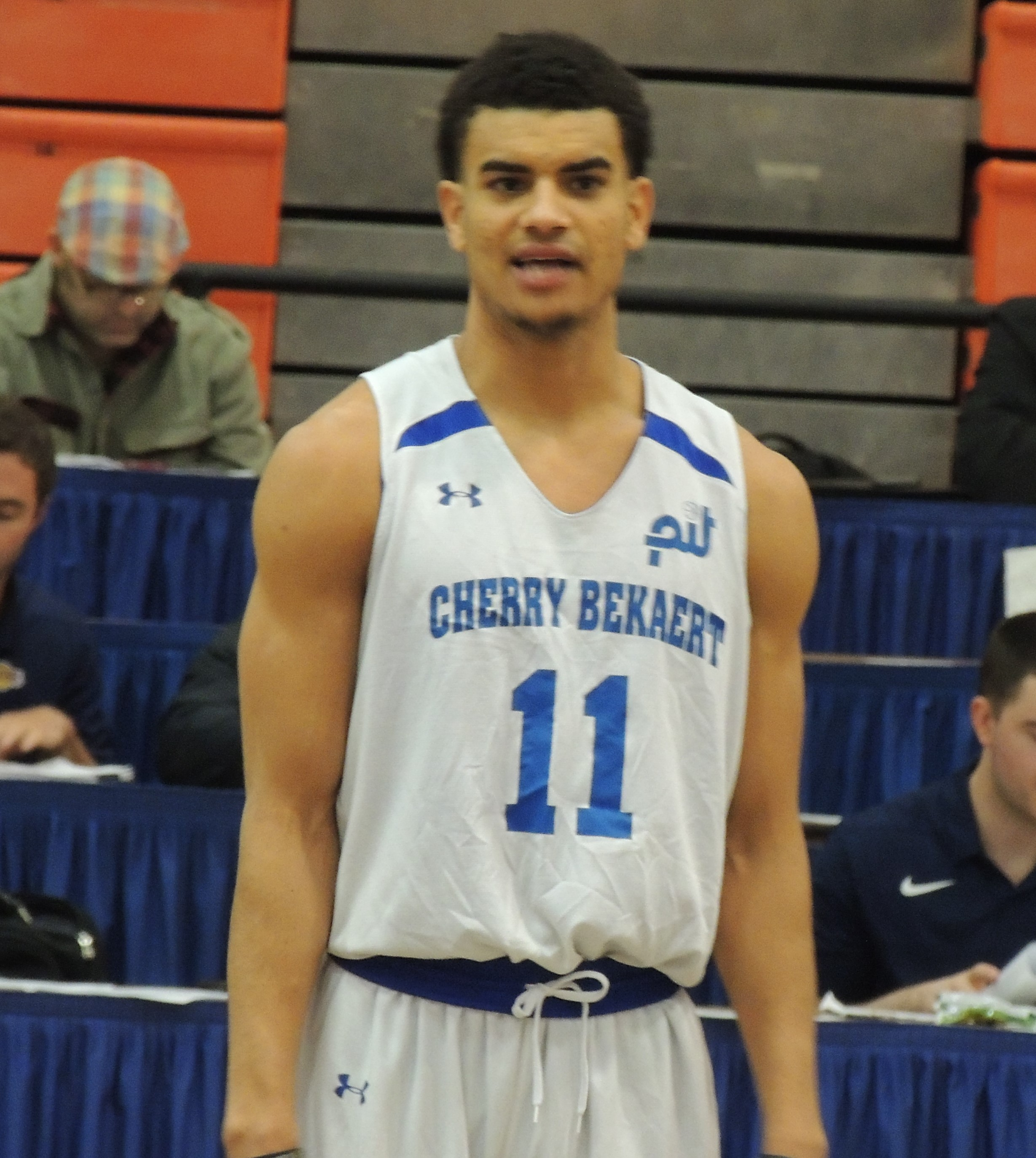
- James at the 2019 Portsmouth Invitational Tournament

No. 1 – Ironi Ness Ziona
- Position: Shooting guard / small forward
- League: Israeli Basketball Premier League

Personal information
- Born: January 24, 1997 (age 29) Port St. Lucie, Florida, U.S.
- Listed height: 6 ft 7 in (2.01 m)
- Listed weight: 185 lb (84 kg)

Career information
- High school: St. Lucie West Centennial (Port St. Lucie, Florida); Oldsmar Christian (Oldsmar, Florida)
- College: Wyoming (2015–2019)
- NBA draft: 2019: 2nd round, 40th overall pick
- Drafted by: Sacramento Kings
- Playing career: 2019–present

Career history
- 2019–2021: Sacramento Kings
- 2019–2020: →Stockton Kings
- 2021–2022: Cleveland Charge
- 2022–2023: Metropolitans 92
- 2023: Cleveland Charge
- 2024–2025: Álftanes
- 2025: Kaohsiung Aquas
- 2026: Álftanes
- 2026: Hapoel Galil Elyon
- 2026–present: Ironi Ness Ziona

Career highlights
- First-team All-Mountain West (2018); Second-team All-Mountain West (2019); Third-team All-Mountain West (2017); Mountain West Sixth Man of the Year (2017); CBI champion (2017); CBI MVP (2017)
- Stats at NBA.com
- Stats at Basketball Reference

Justin Taylor James (born January 24, 1997) is an American professional basketball player for Ironi Ness Ziona of the Israeli Basketball Premier League.

He played college basketball for the Wyoming Cowboys, earning 2017 CBI MVP honors and multiple All-Mountain West selections, and leading the conference in both points and steals per game in his senior year. He was selected by the Sacramento Kings in the second round of the 2019 NBA draft, and played two seasons in the NBA before continuing his career overseas.

== High school career ==
A native of Port St. Lucie, Florida, as a junior in 2013-14 James competed for St. Lucie West Centennial High School and averaged 21.1 points, 8.7 rebounds, 3.6 assists, and 1.9 blocks per game. He was named the 2014 Scripps Treasure Coast Newspapers Player of the Year, and was ranked a three-star recruit by 247Sports.

James played his senior season in 2014-15 at Oldsmar Christian High School. He averaged 20 points, 11 rebounds, and three assists per game during the regular season. He was named Sunshine Independent Athletic Association Player of the Year, and was a three-star recruit according to 247 Sports and Rivals.com.

Out of high school, Jsames generated only one high-major offer, from Mississippi State.

== College career ==
James ultimately attended the University of Wyoming. In 2015-16, his freshman year, he played 31 games and averaged 16.6 minutes, 5.4 points ,and 2.1 rebounds, per game. He became a full-time contributor by his sophomore year, and increased his scoring average each year.

In 2016-17, his sophomore year, he played 37 games and averaged 26.3 minutes, 16.0 points (7th in the conference), 5.0 rebounds, and 2.2 assists per game, while shooting 46.3% from the floor (6th) and 41.9% from three-point range. He was named All-MWC - 3rd Team, MWC Sixth Man of the Year, and MVP of the 2017 College Basketball Invitational tournament .

In 2017-18, his junior year, he played 32 games and averaged 31.1 minutes, 18.9 points (2nd in the conference), 6.0 rebounds, 3.1 assists, and 1.1 steals per game, while shooting 47.2% from the floor (9th). He was named All-MWC - 1st Team, and National Association of Basketball Coaches All-District 17 First Team .

James led the Mountain West Conference and was 19th in the NCAA in scoring per game, and led the conference in steals per game, during his final season at Wyoming, averaging 22.1 points per game and 1.5 steals per game as a senior, He played 32 games and also averaged 38.2 minutes, 8.5 rebounds (6th in the conference), and 4.4 assists (4th) per game. This was despite him playing as a point guard, a position he does not normally play, because Wyoming needed James to have the ball as much as possible during an 8–24 season. He also led the Cowboys with 8.5 rebounds and 4.4 assists per game, Despite his high scoring, James posted career lows in field goal percentage (40.9 percent) and three-point field goal percentage (29.6 percent) during his senior high, as well as 4.1 turnovers per game. He was named second-team All-Mountain West.

James had a three-point field goal percentage of 33.7 percent during his college career. He finished his college career with 2,061 points, the third highest in Mountain West history. He also played in the Portsmouth Invitational Tournament, one of 64 seniors from around the country invited to the event, averaging 12.3 points per game over three games.

== Professional career ==
=== Sacramento Kings (2019–2021) ===
James was selected by the Sacramento Kings in the second round of the 2019 NBA draft with the 40th overall pick, and became the first University of Wyoming player drafted since the Los Angeles Lakers selected Larry Nance Jr. in 2015. CBS Sports had ranked James as the 96th-best prospect heading into the draft, while the Sporting News and NBADraft.net had him unranked, and most mock drafts did not predict that he would be picked. Sacramento general manager Vlade Divac said the team drafted him because they followed his college career and appreciated his passion and production: "We talked to everybody about his professionalism and his love for the game. We were so excited when we spent time with him in Sacramento." On July 10, 2019, the Sacramento Kings announced that they had signed James.

On October 25, 2019, James made his debut in the NBA, coming off the bench in a 112–122 loss to the Portland Trail Blazers with two points. He scored 30 points for the G League's Stockton Kings in a win over the Iowa Wolves on January 11, 2020. In 2019-20 with the Stockton Kings, he played 3 games and averaged 17.4 minutes, 15.7 points, and 2.7 rebounds, 2.0 assists, and 1.3 blocks per game. In 2019-20 with the Sacramento Kings, he played 36 games and averaged 6.5 minutes, 2.5 points, and 0.9 rebounds per game.

In 2020-21 with the Sacramento Kings, he played 36 games and averaged 8.6 minutes, 3.9 points, and 0.8 rebounds per game, while shooting 48.6% from the floor.

=== Cleveland Charge (2021–2022) ===
On September 22, 2021, James signed a two-way contract with the Utah Jazz. However, he was waived on October 1.

On October 13, he signed with the Cleveland Cavaliers. He was waived three days later. On October 23, he signed with the Cleveland Charge as an affiliate player.

On December 26, 2021, the New Orleans Pelicans signed James to a 10-day contract. However, he never appeared in a game for the team.

On January 5, 2022, James was reacquired by the Cleveland Charge. In 2021-22 with the Cleveland Charge, in 36 games James averaged 30.4 minutes, 18.9 points, 5.3 rebounds, and 3.2 assists per game.

James joined the Orlando Magic for the 2022 NBA Summer League. In five games he averaged 18.0 minutes and 13.0 points per game.

=== Metropolitans 92 (2022–2023) ===
On December 13, 2022, James signed with Metropolitans 92 of the LNB Pro A. In 2022-23 with the team, in 8 games he averaged 23.0 minutes, 10.5 points, 3.4 rebounds, and 2.8 assists per game.

=== Return to the Charge (2023) ===
On March 2, 2023, James was re-acquired by the Cleveland Charge. In 2022-23 with the Cleveland Charge, in 9 games James averaged 19.8 minutes, 8.9 points, 1.9 rebounds, and 0.9 assists per game, while shooting 54.2% from the field.

=== Álftanes (2024–2025) ===
On 16 December 2024, James signed with Álftanes of the Icelandic Úrvalsdeild karla. On January 31, he scored a season-high 34 points in a win against ÍR. During the regular season he averaged a team-high 23.1 points along with 5.4 rebounds and 4.0 assists per game. In the playoffs, he helped Álftanes reach the semi-finals, where they bowed out against Tindastóll. In eight playoff games, he averaged 24.0 points, 7.3 rebounds, and 5.3 assists per game. He was named to the 2025 Eurobasket.com All-Icelandic League All-Imports Team, and the Eurobasket 2025 All-Icelandic League Third Team.

=== Kaohsiung Aquas (2025) ===
On August 2, 2025, James signed with the Kaohsiung Aquas of the Taiwan Professional Basketball League (TPBL). On November 10, despite him averaging 23.0 points, 9.5 rebounds, 4.8 assists, and 2.0 steals across four games, Kaohsiung Aquas terminated its contract with James.

=== Hapoel Galil Elyon ===
On April 20, 2026, James signed with Hapoel Galil Elyon. In four games he averaged 31.3 minutes, 15.8 points, 6.0 rebounds, 3.0 assists, and 1.8 steals, while shooting 85.7% from the free throw line.

=== Ironi Nes Ziona ===
James is playing in 2026-27 with Ironi Nes Ziona in the Israeli Basketball Premier League.

== Career statistics ==
Legend
GP	Games played	GS	Games started	MPG	Minutes per game
FG%	Field goal percentage	3P%	3-point field goal percentage	FT%	Free throw percentage
RPG	Rebounds per game	APG	Assists per game	SPG	Steals per game
BPG	Blocks per game	PPG	Points per game	**Bold**	Career high

=== NBA regular season ===
Year	Team	GP	GS	MPG	FG%	3P%	FT%	RPG	APG	SPG	BPG	PPG
2019–20	Sacramento	36	0	6.4	.417	.310	.476	**.9**	.5	.2	**.3**	2.5
2020–21	Sacramento	36	0	**8.6**	**.468**	**.368**	**.583**	.8	**.6**	.2	.1	**3.9**
Career		72	0	7.5	.446	.343	.544	.9	.6	.2	.2	3.2

=== College ===
Year	Team	GP	GS	MPG	FG%	3P%	FT%	RPG	APG	SPG	BPG	PPG
2015–16	Wyoming	31	3	16.6	.418	.358	.565	2.1	.8	.3	.4	5.1
2016–17	Wyoming	**37**	6	26.2	.462	**.419**	**.762**	5.0	2.2	.8	.5	16.0
2017–18	Wyoming	32	**32**	31.2	**.472**	.308	.726	6.0	3.1	1.1	.5	18.9
2018–19	Wyoming	32	**32**	**38.2**	.409	.296	.741	**8.5**	**4.4**	**1.5**	**.6**	**22.1**
Career		132	73	28.1	.442	.337	.731	5.4	2.6	.9	.5	15.6
