= Treasure Coast High School =

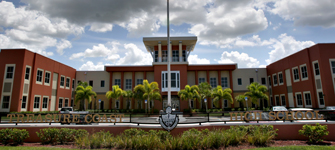
- Viewed from Darwin Blvd.

Location
- 1000 S.W. Darwin Blvd. Port St. Lucie, United States, Florida 34953; 27.244897°N 80.368381°W

Information
- Established: 2006
- School district: St. Lucie County Public Schools
- Principal: Bradley Lehman
- Staff: 111.14 (FTE)
- Grades: 9–12
- Enrollment: 3,144 (2023-24)
- Student to teacher ratio: 27.52
- Campus type: Suburban
- Colors: Black; Gold
- Mascot: Titan
- Nickname: TCHS, TC
- Grade Levels: Global Small Learning Communities: 9th Grade S.T.A.R.S Academy; 10th Grade Explorer Academy; Upper House(11-12)
- Website: TCHS Website

Treasure Coast High School, often abbreviated as TCHS, is a high school located in Port St. Lucie, Florida. The school's name is taken from the Treasure Coast, the name of the region where the school is located, due to the presence of shipwrecks off its coast.

== Campus ==
Treasure Coast High School is made up of four buildings and a central courtyard. The campus is designed to be very open and large to accommodate its students. The campus has trees and other plants. Three of the four buildings are two-story. The only building that does not have a second story is building 3, which contains the auditorium, gymnasium, and several elective classes, including the performing arts hallway and engineering and culinary hallway.

The school was designed so it would be possible to get to any class, from anywhere on campus, within five minutes.

== Academics ==
Treasure Coast High School offers many classes, separated into Small Learning Communities, which are also known as academies. The SLCs are a part of a Global Community which includes the 9th Grade S.T.A.R.S. (Students Transitioning & Aspiring to Reach Success) academy, the 10th Grade Explorer Academy, and the various career academies.

Below is a list of the Career Academies, as well as classes that may be taken at the school:

== Academies ==
A.I.C.E Program, sponsored by the University of Cambridge

- AS and A-Level English Literature
- AS and A-Level Global Perspectives
- AS and A-Level Mathematics
- AS and A-Level Psychology
- AS and A-Level United States History
- AS-Level Art & Design
- AS-Level Biology
- AS-Level Chemistry
- AS-Level Economics
- AS-Level English Language
- AS-Level Environmental Management
- AS-Level European History
- AS-Level French Language
- AS-Level General Paper
- AS-Level Graphic Design
- AS-Level Marine Science
- AS-Level Media Studies
- AS-Level Music
- AS-Level Physical Education
- AS-Level Sociology
- AS-Level Spanish Language
- AS-Level Spanish Literature
- AS-Level Thinking Skills

Public Service and Safety

- Health Science & Allied Health Assisting
- First Responder
- Nursing Assistant

Criminal Justice

US Air Force JROTC

- Aerospace Science
- Leadership Education

Teacher Assisting

Visionary House

- Creative Photography
- Digital Photography
- Drawing
- Entertainment Marketing
- Graphic Design
- International Business
- New Media Technology

Culinary Arts

Innovation House

- Biotechnology
- Pre-Engineering & Manufacturing

The School's Yearbook is called "The Odyssey", named after the epic by Homer.

== Athletics ==
Fall Sports

- Football
- Bowling
- Cross Country
- Golf
- Swimming
- Volleyball
- Cheerleading

Winter Sports

- Basketball
- Wrestling
- Girls' Weightlifting
- Soccer

Spring Sports

- Baseball
- Softball
- Track (including UNIFY)
- Tennis
- Flag football

Cheerleading

- Fall-season football cheerleading
- Winter-season basketball cheerleading

== Technology ==
Each classroom is equipped with a teacher laptop, data projectors, document camera and an audio enhancement microphone system. Each "quad", named after how the central lobby and classrooms are shaped, is provided with a wireless mobile laptop unit for instant access to online resources.

The school also has a manufacturing lab, complete with machinery, to accommodate pre-engineering students, as well as a large kitchen to accommodate culinary arts students. The school also has many computer labs scattered throughout the campus, a complete and working security system, Wi-Fi Connectivity, and a Cell Phone monitoring device.

== Performing Arts ==
The performing arts department at Treasure Coast High School is made up of 4 programs: The band, "Titan Sound", dance, drama dept., "Titan Theatre", and choir, "Titan Voices".

Each of the aforementioned programs have earned multiple accolades in representation of Treasure Coast High School in their respective fields, making TCHS known district-wide for its performance arts programs.

== Recognitions ==
In the 2008-2009 school year, the Florida Department of Education (FDOE) rated Treasure Coast High School a "C" school, for the second year in a row.

In the 2009-2010 school year, the Florida Department of Education rated Treasure Coast High School a "B" school. It is the first true public high school in the St. Lucie County School District to be rated "B" with the exception of Lincoln Park Academy, a magnet school.

TCHS continued to receive a "B" rating until the 2018-2019 school, with the exception of the 2015-2016 school year, where the school received a "C" rating.

In the 2020-2021 school year, TCHS either did not qualify for or chose not to opt-into receiving a school grade. This was under FDOE Emergency Order No. 2021-EO-02, which delegated exceptions to the traditional school grading process amidst the COVID-19 pandemic.

In the following school year, 2021-2022, TCHS would receive its first "A" rating. This was followed by "B" ratings for the few years following, and this rated has continued up to the current school year.
