= Port St. Lucie, Florida =

City in the United States

- City
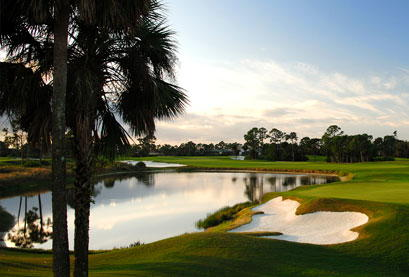
- PGA Golf Club in Port St. Lucie
- Motto: Heart of the Treasure Coast
- Location in St. Lucie County and the state of Florida
- Coordinates: 27°15′34″N 80°20′17″W
- Country: United States
- State: Florida
- County: St. Lucie
- Incorporated: April 27, 1961

Government
  - Type: Council-manager

Area
  - City: 120.83 sq mi (312.94 km^{2})
  - Land: 119.22 sq mi (308.77 km^{2})
  - Water: 1.61 sq mi (4.17 km^{2})
- Elevation: 23 ft (7.0 m)

Population (2020)
  - City: 204,851
  - Estimate (2025): 268,062 ▲
  - Rank: US: 93rd
  - Density: 1,718.3/sq mi (663.45/km^{2})
  - Urban: 437,745 (US: 93rd)
  - Urban density: 1,952/sq mi (753.8/km^{2})
  - Metro: 487,657 (US: 112th)
- Time zone: UTC−05:00 (Eastern (EST))
  - Summer (DST): UTC−04:00 (EDT)
- ZIP codes: 34952-34953, 34983-34988
- Area code: Area code 772
- FIPS code: 12-58715
- GNIS feature ID: 2404558
- Website: www.cityofpsl.com

Port St. Lucie is a city in St. Lucie County, Florida, United States. It is the most-populous municipality in the county and the sixth-most populous city in Florida, with a population of 204,851 at the 2020 census. It is located 125 miles (201 km) southeast of Orlando and 113 miles (182 km) north of Miami. It is a principal city in the Port St. Lucie metropolitan statistical area, which includes St. Lucie and Martin Counties, and as of 2021 had an estimated population of 502,521. Port St. Lucie is also a principal city in the Miami-Fort Lauderdale-Port St. Lucie combined statistical area, which had an estimated population of 6,841,100 as of 2021. It is one of the cities of the Treasure Coast area.

== History ==
The name "St. Lucie" is originally derived from the name of a settlement near Jupiter Inlet, which was founded on St. Lucia's Day in 1566. Due to numerous errors, the name later came to be associated with the present-day town of St. Lucie Village, Florida, north of present-day Port St. Lucie. After La Florida and St. Augustine, it is the oldest still-in-use European place name in the United States. In the early 1890s, an early pioneer settlement named Spruce Bluff was located along the St. Lucie River, which consisted of a community of several families with a school, post office, pineapple plantation, and sawmill. Currently, the land the settlement was located on is part of the Spruce Bluff Preserve. Along with an old cemetery near the old settlement, the preserve also contains a hiking area, canoe access, observation areas, and a prehistoric Ais Indian mound located on the southern end of the preserve.

In the 1950s, the land that eventually became Port St. Lucie was a largely uninhabited tract of land south of White City, composed of a fishing camp (Burt Pruitt's Fishin' Farm) along the St. Lucie River, a few farms and businesses near U.S. 1. In 1958, with a budget of $50 million, the General Development Corporation (GDC) purchased the River Park development and 40,000 acres (160 km^{2}) along the North Fork of the St. Lucie River. In 1959, the GDC opened its first bridge over the St. Lucie River, allowing for direct automobile access to Port St. Lucie.

By February 25, 1961, 250 homes were in the new city. GDC requested the state legislature to incorporate 70 mi (110 km), along with the River Park settlement, into the City of Port St. Lucie. River Park did not incorporate into the city at the request of its residents. Port St. Lucie became a city on April 27, 1961, with the passage of House Bill No. 953, proposed by State Representative Rupert Smith and approved by Florida Governor C. Farris Bryant.

In the early 1990s, Core Communities (CC), acquired and began planning what would become St. Lucie West. Originally, St. Lucie West was to have contained about 14,000 homes over a 20-year period on 7 sq mi (18 km^{2}), but after realizing the community's strategic position, they began developing it into more than just a residential area. CC began building business sectors and places of entertainment and leisure. That resulted in 7,000 jobs being brought to the small town, helping it into its boom during most of the early 2000s.

In 2006, CC started development of its newest community, Tradition, which sits west of the Interstate 95 interchange with Gatlin Blvd., and was a large cattle ranch before CC began to develop it. Around 13,000,000 sq ft (1,200,000 m^{2}) of commercial area were built, with room for over 18,000 residences. According to CC's website, Tradition is the largest fully entitled residential development area from the tip of Interstate 95 to the Canada–U.S. border. It is modeled after a 1950s-era town. According to its website, Tradition Square, the town center of the community, holds festivities year-round. It was also chosen as the site of HGTV's Green Home in 2009.

In 2007, the housing market began to collapse and unemployment started to rise. As of February 2009, unemployment was about 10.5%, and in 2008, nearly 11,000 homes went into foreclosure. This prompted the county government to consider declaring itself a disaster area. Doing so would have given county administrators access to $17 million in county emergency reserve funds. That money, combined with a transportation fund and other accounts, would give St. Lucie $20–$30 million to spend on building projects - research parks, highways, and other infrastructure improvements.

In 2008, Tradition and Core Communities welcomed the Florida Center of Innovation (later renamed Tradition Center for Innovation), a 150-acre privately owned research park dedicated to drug discovery, immunology and medical devices, and healthcare. TCI initially composed of Torrey Pines Institute for Molecular Studies, Oregon Health and Science University's Vaccine and Gene Therapy Institute (VGTI), Martin Health System Hospital (Tradition Medical Center), and Mann Research Center. In 2015, VGTI shut down their TCI facility, and Mann Research Center soon followed. As of 2019, only Torrey Pines and the Tradition Medical Center remain in TCI.

In 2017, TAMCO, a subsidiary of City Electric Supply, created plans with the Port St. Lucie city council to construct a $38 million, 400,000-square-foot manufacturing and distribution center located in the Tradition Commerce Park. Construction of the TAMCO facility began in 2018 and was completed in late 2019.

== Geography ==
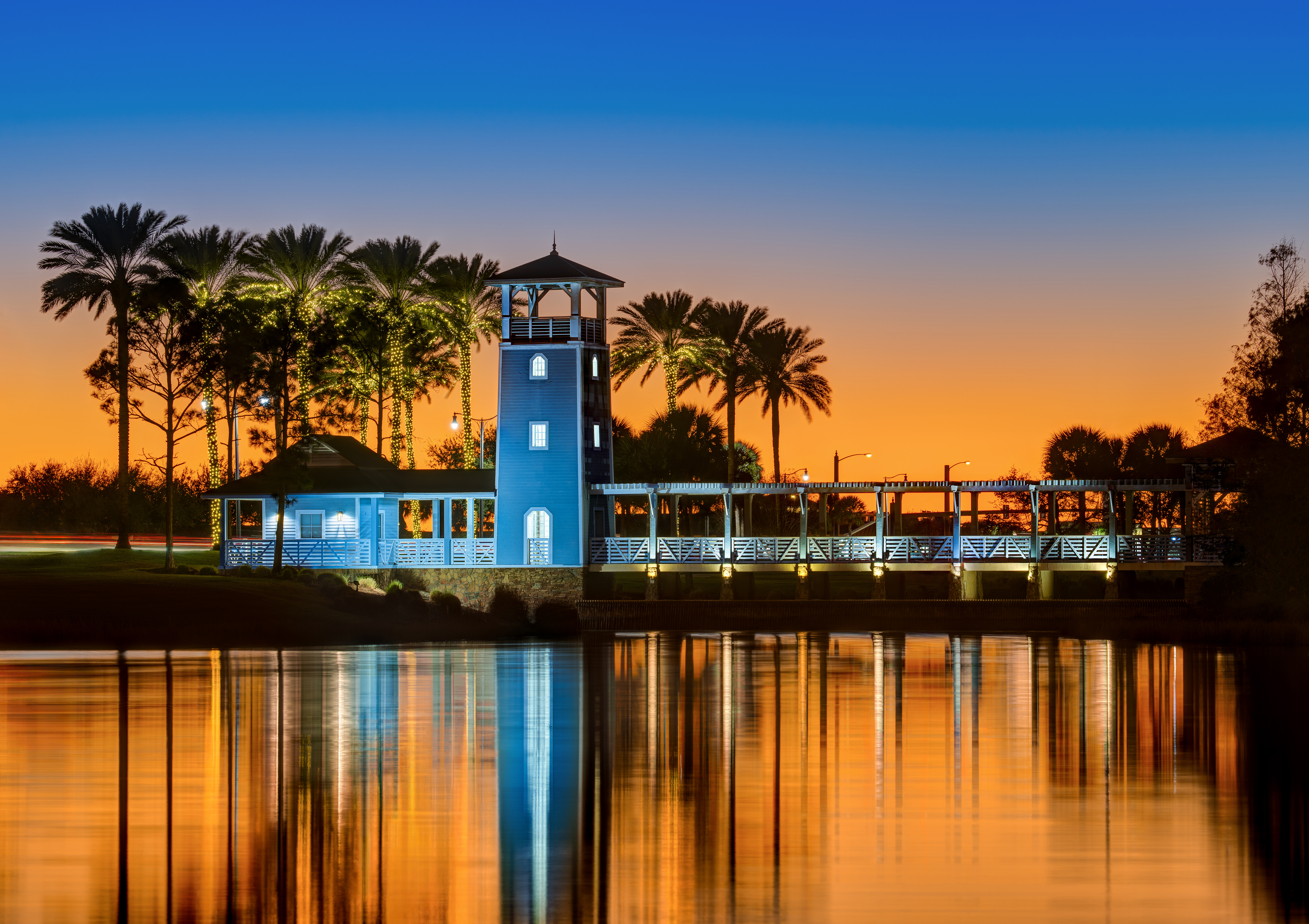
Lake Tradition

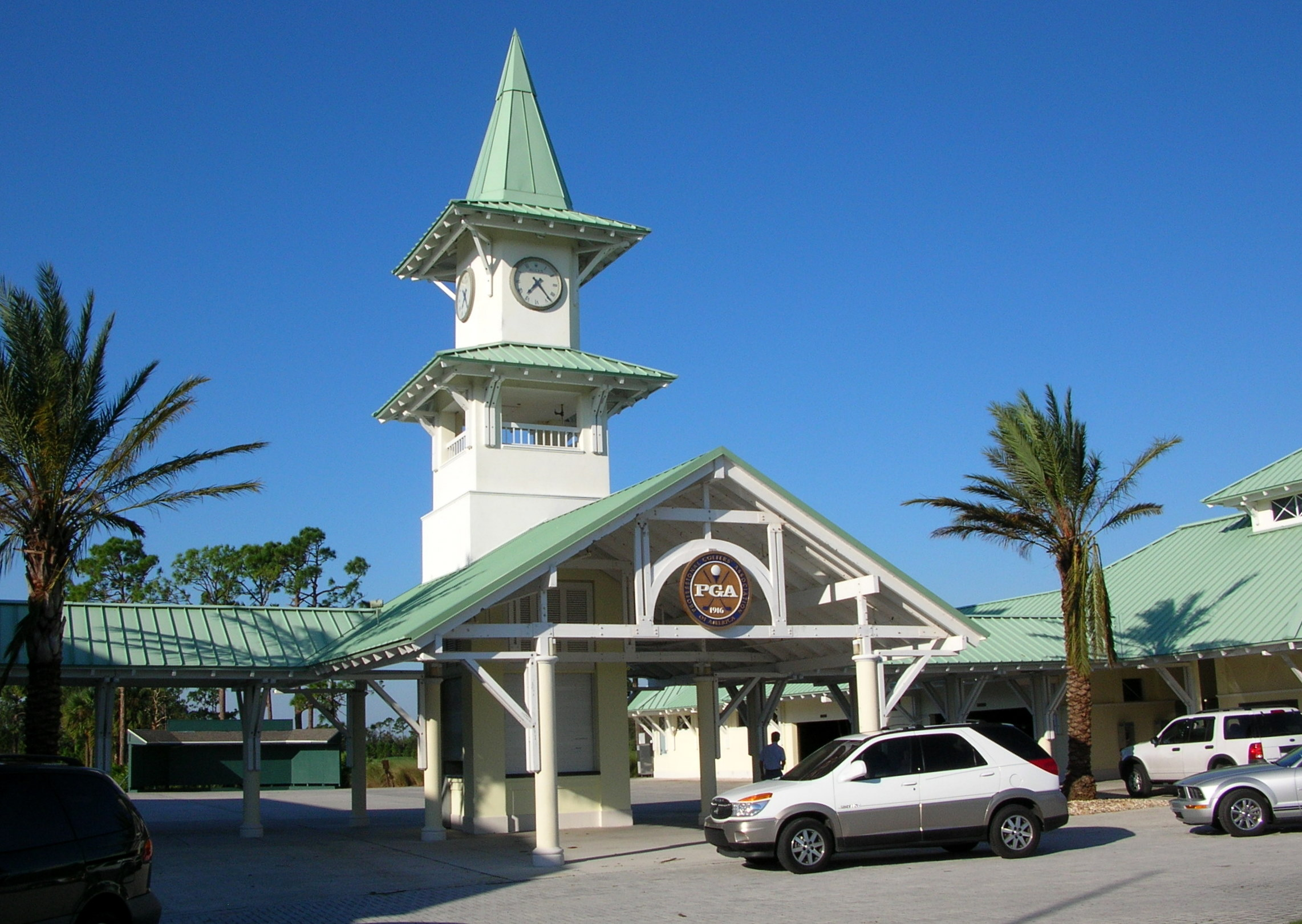
The PGA Village golf complex is in the Veranda neighborhood

According to the United States Census Bureau, the city has a total area of 76.7 sq mi (198.6 km^{2}), of which 1.2 sq mi (3.0 km^{2}) (1.50%) are covered by water.

=== Neighborhoods ===
In late 2019, Port St. Lucie began naming different neighborhoods throughout the city. As of 2020, 33 neighborhoods are named in Port St. Lucie:

- Bayshore Business District
- Bayshore Heights
- Becker Ridge
- Canal Pointe
- Cashmere Cove
- Crane Landing
- Fairgreen Crossing
- Floresta Gardens
- Floresta Pointe
- Gatlin Pines
- Hidden Oaks
- Lyngate
- Morningside
- Newport Isles
- Northport Village
- Oak Hammock
- Paar Estates
- Palm Trails
- Riverview
- Rosser Reserve
- Sandhill Crossing
- Sandpiper Bay
- Sawgrass Lakes
- Southbend Lakes
- St. Lucie North
- St. Lucie West
- Swan Park
- Torino
- Tradition
- Tulip Park
- Veranda
- Whispering Pines
- Woodland Trails

=== Climate ===
Port St. Lucie is located in the broad transition zone between a humid subtropical climate (Cfa), which prevails in Central Florida, and within the northern extent of the tropical climate typical of South Florida. Summers are usually hot, with high temperatures averaging in the low 90°Fs. Winters are usually mild to warm, with average high temperatures in the 70s. The average yearly precipitation is around 53.5 in. In 2004 and 2005, Port St. Lucie was hit directly by three hurricanes: Frances (category 2), Jeanne (category 3), and Wilma (category 3).

Climate data for Fort Pierce, Florida (Treasure Coast International Airport), 1991–2020 normals, extremes 1901–present
| Month | Jan | Feb | Mar | Apr | May | Jun | Jul | Aug | Sep | Oct | Nov | Dec | Year |
|---|---|---|---|---|---|---|---|---|---|---|---|---|---|
| Record high °F (°C) | 89 (32) | 90 (32) | 93 (34) | 97 (36) | 98 (37) | 101 (38) | 101 (38) | 101 (38) | 99 (37) | 98 (37) | 92 (33) | 89 (32) | 101 (38) |
| Mean maximum °F (°C) | 84.4 (29.1) | 86.4 (30.2) | 89.4 (31.9) | 91.0 (32.8) | 93.4 (34.1) | 94.9 (34.9) | 95.7 (35.4) | 95.0 (35.0) | 93.3 (34.1) | 90.9 (32.7) | 87.0 (30.6) | 84.7 (29.3) | 97.0 (36.1) |
| Mean daily maximum °F (°C) | 73.4 (23.0) | 75.7 (24.3) | 78.3 (25.7) | 81.9 (27.7) | 85.6 (29.8) | 88.5 (31.4) | 90.3 (32.4) | 90.2 (32.3) | 88.1 (31.2) | 84.2 (29.0) | 79.2 (26.2) | 75.4 (24.1) | 82.6 (28.1) |
| Daily mean °F (°C) | 62.3 (16.8) | 64.8 (18.2) | 67.4 (19.7) | 71.5 (21.9) | 76.2 (24.6) | 79.9 (26.6) | 81.4 (27.4) | 81.6 (27.6) | 80.3 (26.8) | 76.4 (24.7) | 69.9 (21.1) | 65.5 (18.6) | 73.1 (22.8) |
| Mean daily minimum °F (°C) | 51.2 (10.7) | 53.9 (12.2) | 56.5 (13.6) | 61.1 (16.2) | 66.8 (19.3) | 71.3 (21.8) | 72.6 (22.6) | 72.9 (22.7) | 72.6 (22.6) | 68.5 (20.3) | 60.6 (15.9) | 55.7 (13.2) | 63.6 (17.6) |
| Mean minimum °F (°C) | 34.0 (1.1) | 37.0 (2.8) | 41.3 (5.2) | 47.6 (8.7) | 56.7 (13.7) | 66.5 (19.2) | 68.7 (20.4) | 69.2 (20.7) | 67.2 (19.6) | 53.9 (12.2) | 44.7 (7.1) | 38.1 (3.4) | 31.8 (−0.1) |
| Record low °F (°C) | 19 (−7) | 25 (−4) | 26 (−3) | 33 (1) | 45 (7) | 56 (13) | 61 (16) | 61 (16) | 59 (15) | 42 (6) | 31 (−1) | 19 (−7) | 19 (−7) |
| Average precipitation inches (mm) | 2.82 (72) | 2.17 (55) | 2.88 (73) | 3.03 (77) | 3.93 (100) | 6.69 (170) | 5.85 (149) | 6.94 (176) | 6.27 (159) | 5.25 (133) | 3.01 (76) | 2.33 (59) | 51.17 (1,300) |
| Average precipitation days (≥ 0.01 in) | 8.7 | 7.7 | 8.1 | 7.2 | 9.0 | 14.2 | 15.3 | 15.4 | 15.4 | 12.2 | 10.4 | 9.3 | 132.9 |
Source: NOAA

== Demographics ==
Historical population
| Census | Pop. | Note | %± |
|---|---|---|---|
| 1970 | 330 | | — |
| 1980 | 14,690 | | 4,351.5% |
| 1990 | 55,866 | | 280.3% |
| 2000 | 88,769 | | 58.9% |
| 2010 | 164,603 | | 85.4% |
| 2020 | 204,851 | | 24.5% |
| 2025 (est.) | 268,062 | ▲ | 30.9% |
U.S. Decennial Census

=== Racial and ethnic composition ===
Port St. Lucie, Florida – Racial and ethnic composition Note: the US Census treats Hispanic/Latino as an ethnic category. This table excludes Latinos from the racial categories and assigns them to a separate category. Hispanics/Latinos may be of any race.
| Race / Ethnicity (NH = Non-Hispanic) | Pop 2000 | Pop 2010 | Pop 2020 | % 2000 | % 2010 | % 2020 |
|---|---|---|---|---|---|---|
| White (NH) | 73,489 | 101,329 | 108,020 | 82.79% | 61.56% | 52.73% |
| Black or African American (NH) | 6,035 | 25,612 | 36,659 | 6.80% | 15.56% | 17.90% |
| Native American or Alaska Native (NH) | 183 | 371 | 306 | 0.21% | 0.23% | 0.15% |
| Asian (NH) | 1,089 | 3,194 | 4,304 | 1.23% | 1.94% | 2.10% |
| Native Hawaiian or Pacific Islander alone (NH) | 24 | 86 | 100 | 0.03% | 0.05% | 0.05% |
| Other race alone (NH) | 173 | 680 | 1,928 | 0.19% | 0.41% | 0.94% |
| Mixed race or Multiracial (NH) | 1,099 | 3,081 | 8,923 | 1.24% | 1.87% | 4.36% |
| Hispanic or Latino (any race) | 6,677 | 30,250 | 44,611 | 7.52% | 18.38% | 21.78% |
| Total | 88,769 | 164,603 | 204,851 | 100.00% | 100.00% | 100.00% |

=== 2020 census ===
As of the 2020 United States census, 204,851 people, 68,241 households, and 51,199 families were residing in the city.

=== 2010 census ===
As of the 2010 United States census, 164,603 people, 56,408 households, and 41,785 families resided in the city.

=== 2000 census ===
As of the census of 2000, 88,769 people, 33,909 households, and 25,736 families were living in the city. The population density was 453.7 people/km^{2} (1,175 people/mi^{2}). There were 36,785 housing units at an average density of 188.0 units/km^{2} (487 units/mi^{2}). In 2000, the population was 87.88% White, 7.09% Black or African American, 0.23% Native American, 1.24% Asian, 0.03% Pacific Islander, 1.77% from other races, and 1.76% from two or more races. 7.52% of the population were Hispanic or Latino of any race.

In 2000, 31.6% of households had children under 18 living with them, 61.8% were married couples living together, 10.0% had a female householder with no husband present, and 24.1% were not families. Of all households, 18.2% were made up of individuals, and 8.9% had someone living alone who was 65 or older. The average household size was 2.60 and the average family size was 2.94.

In 2000, the city's age distribution was 24.3% under 18, 5.9% from 18 to 24, 28.1% from 25 to 44, 22.8% from 45 to 64, and 18.8% who were 65 or older. The median age was 40 years. For every 100 females, there were 94.5 males. For every 100 females 18 and over, there were 91.4 males.

As of 2000, the median income for a household in the city was $40,509, and for a family was $44,162. Males had a median income of $31,730 versus $23,702 for females. The per capita income for the city was $18,059. 7.9% of the population and 5.7% of families were below the poverty line, including 11.1% of those under 18 and 5.8% of those 65 or over.

=== Languages ===
As of 2000, 88.05% of residents spoke English as their first language, while 6.59% spoke Spanish, 1.34% spoke Italian, 1.00% spoke French, 0.60% spoke German, and 0.50% spoke Haitian Creole as their mother tongue. In total, 11.94% of the total population spoke languages other than English.

== Infrastructure ==
=== Transportation ===
Port St. Lucie is served by the St. Lucie Transportation Planning Organization (TPO). The TPO is a metropolitan planning organization, a federally mandated and federally funded transportation policy-making organization responsible for transportation planning, programming, and financing of state and federal transportation funds for the City of Port St. Lucie. The TPO is governed by a TPO board, which is composed of elected officials, representatives from the St. Lucie County School Board, and representatives from Community Transit, a division of the Council on Aging of St. Lucie, Inc.

==== Bus ====
The original bus system started out as a demand-response service bus in the 1990s; it only served St. Lucie County. Soon, it expanded to a fixed-route system, serving predetermined locations along a route. On June 3, 2002, the Florida Department of Transportation approved funding, expanding the bus service to Martin County, and became the Treasure Coast Connector. In 2020, the bus service changed its name to Area Regional Transit; buses run on eight routes, five of which serve Port St. Lucie.

==== Expressways ====
Florida's Turnpike (State Road 91) is the only toll road in St. Lucie County, which is the northernmost place where the Turnpike and Interstate 95 run close to each other. The Turnpike has two exits within Port St. Lucie's city limits: Exit 142 (Port St. Lucie Boulevard (SR 716)) and exit 138 (Becker Road). For all of its route through Port St. Lucie, the turnpike is east of I-95. The Turnpike is four lanes wide, and provides access to Orlando to the north, and Miami to the southeast. The Port St. Lucie/Ft. Pierce Service Plaza is also located in Port St. Lucie.

I-95 (Florida State Road 9) is in the western portion of the city. It is six lanes wide, and provides access to Jacksonville to the north, and Miami to the south. Exits within the city's limits are exit 126 (CR 712/Midway Road), exit 121 (St. Lucie West Blvd.), exit 120 (Crosstown Parkway), exit 118 (Gatlin Blvd./Tradition Pkwy.), and exit 114 (Becker Rd.).

==== Major roadways ====
Port St. Lucie is responsible for maintaining around 912.5 miles (1,468.5 km) of roadway within its city limits.

US 1 (State Road 5) – Running the entire length of the state, its route through the city extends from the Martin/St. Lucie County line to the south to Midway Road at the northern limits of the city. This stretch of US 1 contains mostly strip malls and shopping centers. On the southeast corner of US 1's intersection with Walton Road/Veterans Memorial Blvd., is the MIDFLORIDA Credit Union Event Center, which was once envisioned as the center of the city's "downtown". As of today, the area around the Event Center remains mostly undeveloped.

Crosstown Parkway – Completed in October 2019, Crosstown Parkway is an east/west roadway connecting Interstate 95 (State Road 9) with U.S. 1 (State Road 5). Along with being a much-needed, high-capacity, third crossing of the North Fork of the St. Lucie River (Port St. Lucie Blvd. to the south, and Prima Vista Blvd. to the north being the other two), it is also the location of Florida's first superstreet intersection—also known as a "restricted-crossing U-turn intersection"—at Crosstown Parkway and Floresta Drive.

SR 716 – The state-road portion of Port St. Lucie Boulevard (commonly shortened to PSL Blvd.) connects US 1 with Florida's Turnpike.

==== Rail ====
The Florida East Coast Railway (FEC) mainline passes through the extreme eastern parts of the city. FEC's K Branch passes through the northwestern part of the city. Both rail lines only pass through the city; no services are provided by the FEC inside Port St. Lucie's city limits.

== Sports ==
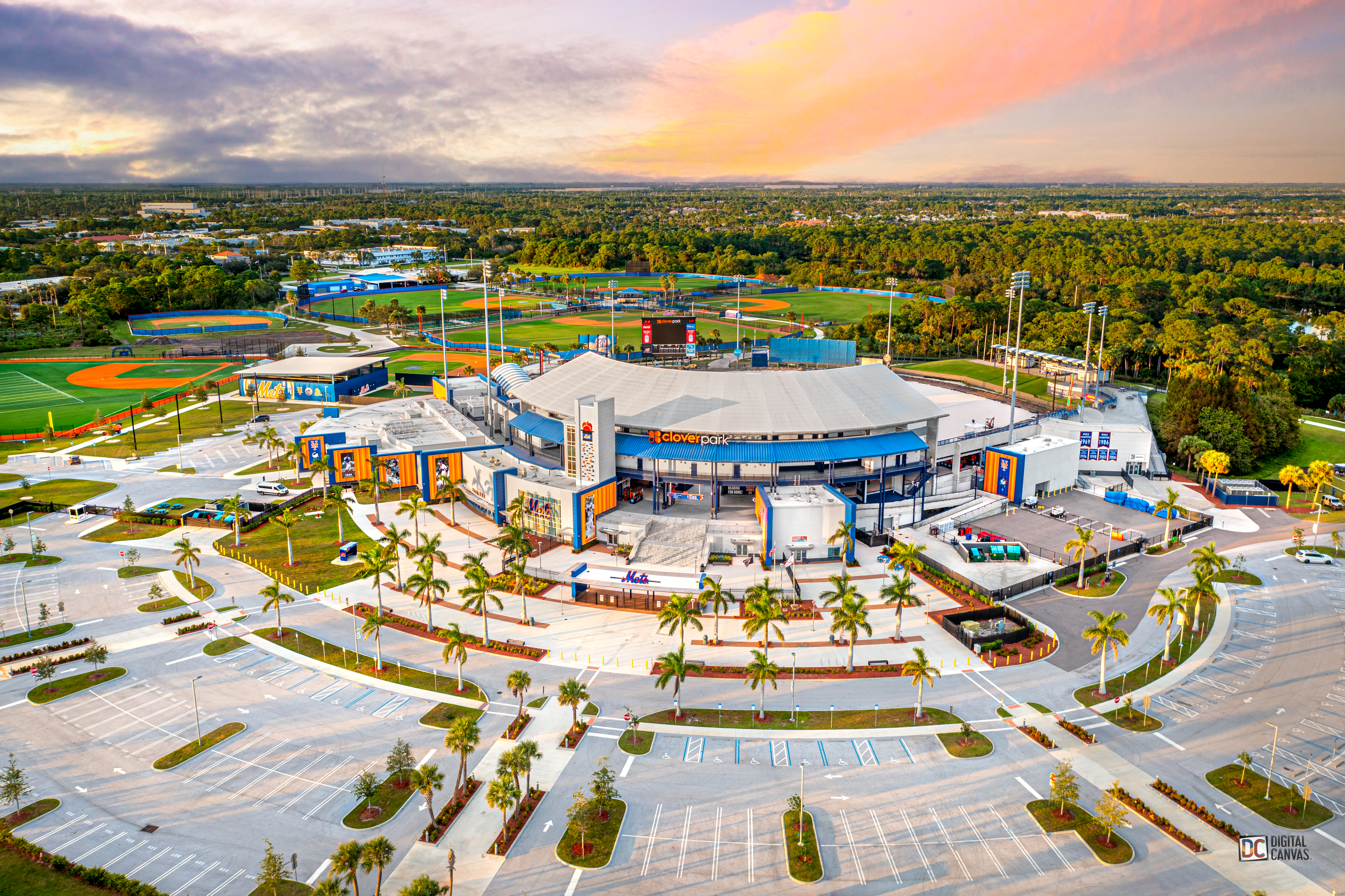
The baseball stadium of Clover Park was built in time for the 1988 season and holds 7,160 people.

Port St. Lucie is the spring training home to the New York Mets and two minor league teams: St. Lucie Mets, a Low-A team in the Florida State League, and the Florida Complex League Mets, a rookie-level team in the Florida Complex League. All three play at Clover Park.

The PGA Village golf complex includes 54 holes, plus a learning center and a historical center. The city also hosted the Ginn sur Mer Classic at Tesoro in 2007, the city's first PGA Tour event.

The city has two soccer clubs, Mako Soccer Club and Port St. Lucie SC, that field both competitive and recreational teams at several age levels. The FC Florida U23 soccer team also plays in the city at the South County Stadium, starting in the 2019 season.

Port St. Lucie is the home of the 2009 and 2011 national champions in Pop Warner football. In 2009, the Jr. Midget Pirates went 16–0 en route to winning the Pop Warner National Championship at Disney's Wide World of Sports Complex. In 2001, the Jr. Peewee Pirates went 17–0 in winning the national championship.

== Education ==
Port St. Lucie, as well as all of St Lucie County, is served by St. Lucie County Public Schools.

=== Elementary schools ===
- Bayshore Elementary
- Floresta Elementary
- Mariposa Elementary
- Morningside Elementary
- Rivers Edge Elementary
- Village Green Environmental Studies School
- Windmill Point Elementary

=== Kindergarten–grade 8 schools ===
- Allapattah Flats
- Manatee
- Northport
- Oak Hammock
- Palm Pointe Research School at Tradition
- St. Lucie West
- West Gate

=== Kindergarten–grade 12 schools ===
- Christ Lutheran School
- Grace Christian Academy

=== High schools ===
- Port St. Lucie High School
- St. Lucie West Centennial High School
- Treasure Coast High School
- Legacy High School

=== Colleges and universities ===
- Indian River State College
- Keiser University
- Fortis Institute

=== Charter schools ===
- Renaissance Charter School at Tradition
- Renaissance Charter School of St. Lucie
- Somerset Academy Bethany
- Somerset Academy St. Lucie
- Somerset College Preparatory Academy
- Tradition Preparatory High School

== Government ==
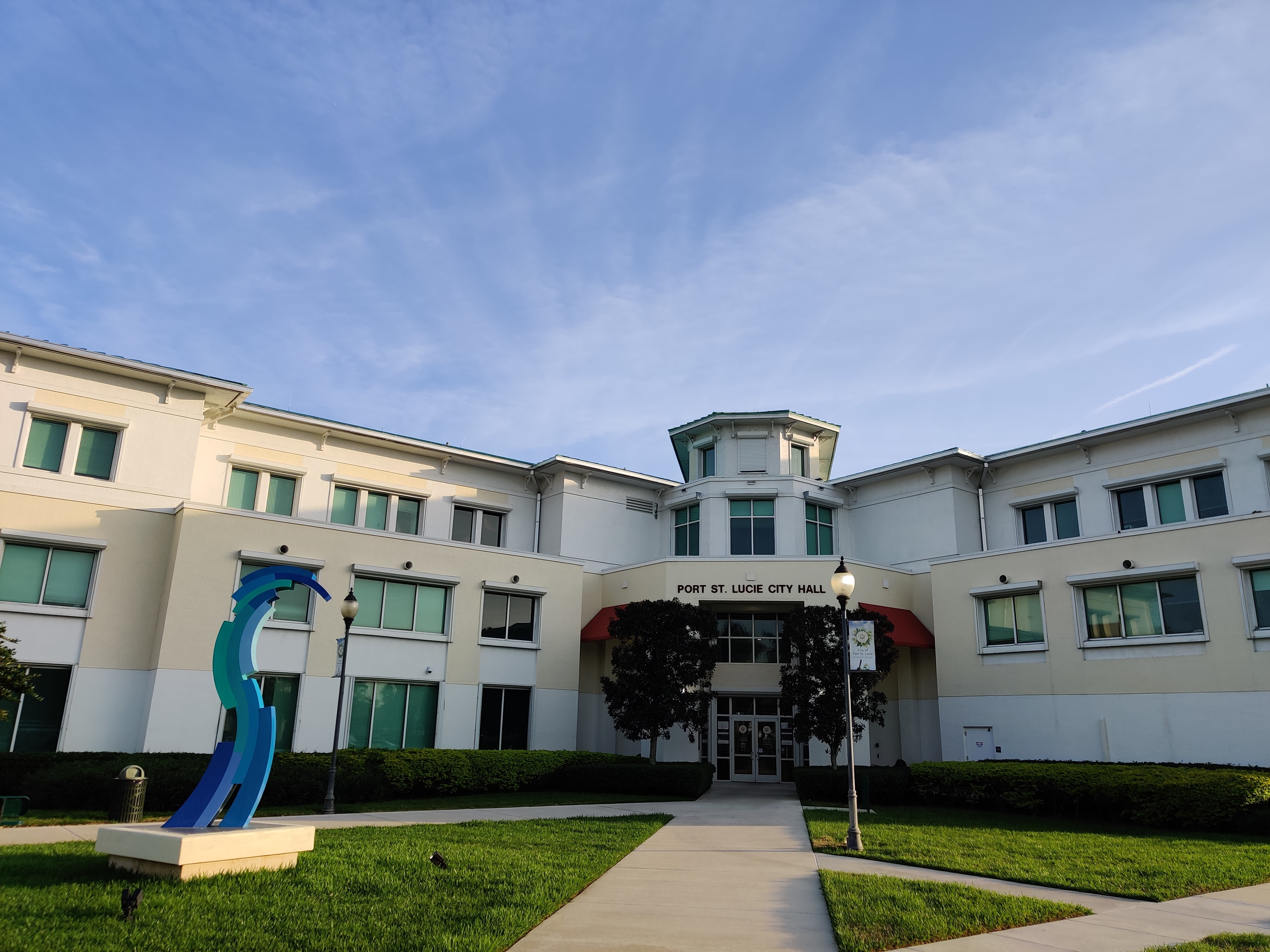
Port St. Lucie City Hall

City council

- Shannon Martin – mayor of Port St. Lucie
- Jolien Caraballo – vice mayor and councilwoman, District 4
- Stephanie Morgan – councilwoman, District 1
- David Pickett – councilman, District 2
- Anthony Bonna – councilman, District 3

City manager

- Jesus Merejo

== Parks and tourist attractions ==
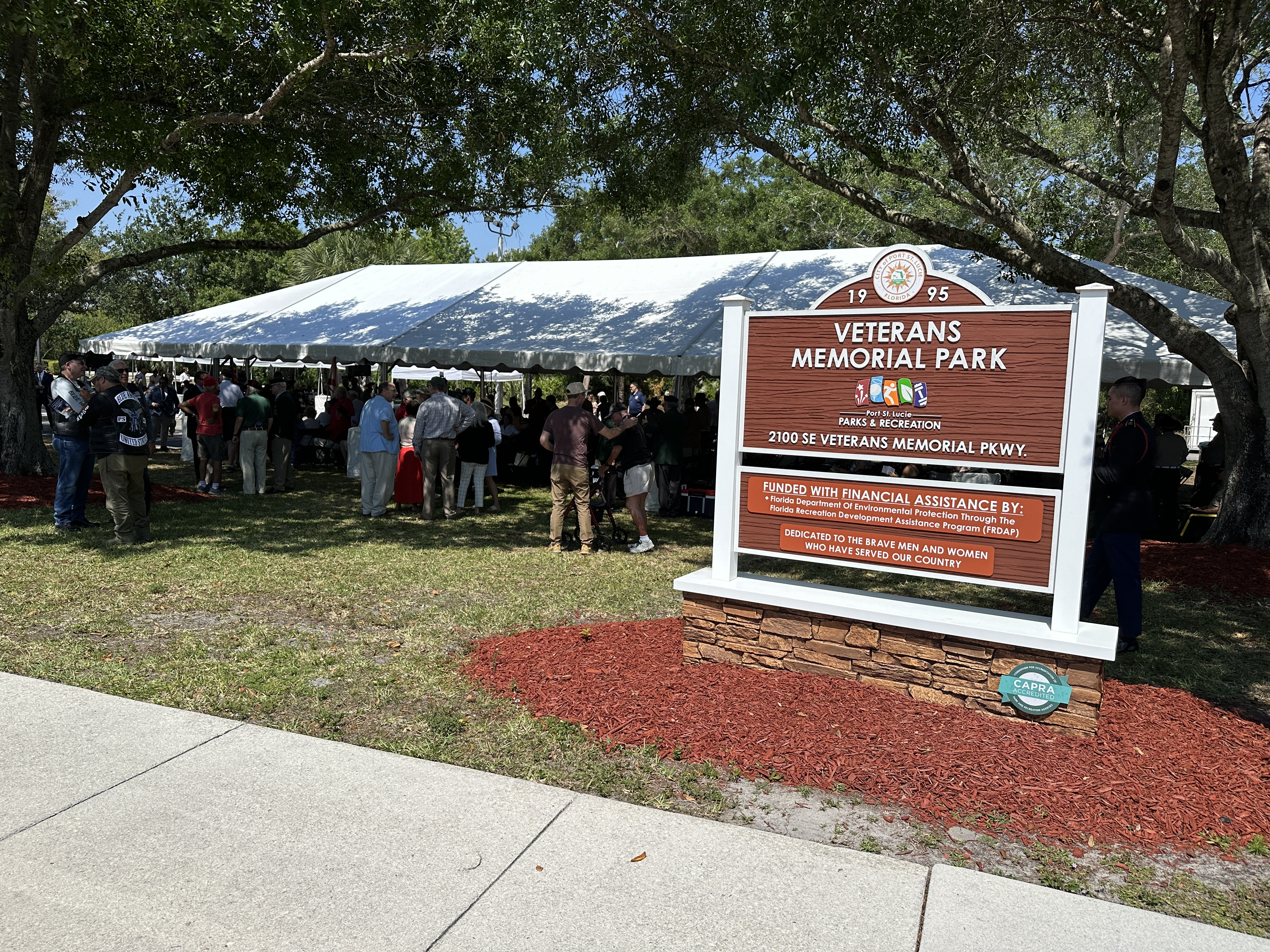
Veterans Memorial Park

- Port St. Lucie Botanical Gardens
- Savannas Preserve State Park
- Veterans Memorial Park

== Libraries ==
Six regular branch libraries are in St. Lucie County and the Pruitt Campus Library, with four branches in the city of Port St. Lucie.

- Morningside Library - 19,000 sq ft
- Port St. Lucie Library - 4,400 sq ft
- Paula A. Lewis Library - 21,000 sq ft
- Pruitt Campus (a joint facility with Indian River State College) - 25,000 sq ft

== Notable people ==
- Rick Ankiel, Major League Baseball player
- Mario Bencastro, Salvadorian novelist
- Michael Brantley, professional baseball player
- Donald De La Haye, professional football player
- Megan Fox, actress
- Ace Hood, hip hop artist
- Justin James, playing in the Israeli Basketball Premier League
- Breanna Myles, beauty pageant titleholder
- Jaida Parker, professional wrestler
- Alycia Parks, professional tennis player
- Gillian Robertson, UFC fighter
- Larry Sanders, professional basketball player
- Fabrizio Scaccia, professional football player
- Din Thomas, UFC fighter
- Albert Wilson, professional football player
- Mickey Wright, LPGA Hall of Fame

== In popular culture ==
Part of the James Bond film Moonraker was shot in Port St. Lucie, on the St. Lucie River.
