= Fort Pierce Westwood Academy =

Fort Pierce Westwood Academy: The WEST Prep Magnet

Location
- 1801 Panther Lane; Fort Pierce, Florida 34947; United States; 27.464660644531°N 80.374084472656°W

Information
- Type: Public
- Established: 1977; 49 years ago
- School district: St. Lucie Public Schools
- Principal: David Alfonso
- Staff: 86.89 (FTE)
- Grades: 9–12
- Enrollment: 1,956 (2023-2024)
- Student to teacher ratio: 22.51
- Colors: Maroon; Gray
- Mascot: Panthers
- Yearbook: Panther Prints
- Website: https://schools.stlucie.k12.fl.us/fpw/

Fort Pierce Westwood Academy: The WEST Prep Magnet, commonly referred to as Fort Pierce Westwood Academy, and formerly known as Fort Pierce Westwood High School, is a public high school located in Fort Pierce, Florida, United States. It is part of the St. Lucie Public Schools district.

== History ==
The school was founded in 1977 as Fort Pierce Westwood High School.

Beginning in the 2019-2020 academic year, the school was officially renamed to Fort Pierce Westwood Academy: The WEST Prep Magnet as part of being awarded the Magnet School Assistance Program Grant. The grant was awarded along with two other schools in St. Lucie County in order to increase enrollment and improve college readiness. More specifically, it allowed the school to offer new courses for pre-medical, pharmacy technician, and data science programs, as well as improved science laboratory facilities.

== Academics ==
=== Programs ===
- Magnet Programs
  - Agricultural Technology
  - Computer Science
  - Health Unit Coordinator
  - Pharmacy Technician
  - Robotics and Engineering
  - Veterinary Technician
- Attractor Programs
  - Marine and Oceanographic Academy
- Career and Technical Education
  - Criminal Justice
  - Culinary Arts
  - Digital Design

=== Marine and Oceanographic Academy ===
The WEST Prep Academy’s Marine and Oceanographic Academy (MOA) offers students a specialized curriculum focused on marine and oceanographic studies alongside general education courses. The academy is located approximately 5.5 miles northeast of WEST Prep's main campus on the campus of the Harbor Branch Oceanographic Institute. The highly immersive program offers students the opportunity to learn directly from Harbor Branch faculty and participate in hands-on field and laboratory experiences.

== Athletics ==
Athletes from Westwood compete as the Panthers and their colors are maroon and gray.

=== State championships ===
- Girls Cross Country
  - Class 3A: 1991
- Boys Track and Field
  - 300-Meter Hurdles Class 4A: 1994 (38.00)
  - 4 x 400 Meter Relay Class 4A: 1999 (3:21.89)
  - 4 x 400 Meter Relay Class 2A: 2000 (3:18.85)
  - Discus Class 3A: 1991 (170' 4")
- Boys Wrestling (Individual)
  - Class 3A: 1992 (112), 1993 (119)

== Notable alumni ==
=== Athletes ===
- Football
  - Jeff Blackshear, former professional football player
  - Yamon Figurs, former professional football player
  - Anthony Harris, former professional football player
  - Khalil Mack, current professional football player for the Los Angeles Chargers
  - Ryan McNeil, former professional football player
  - Mario Monds, former professional football player
  - Luther Robinson, former professional football player
  - Craig Swoope, former professional football player
  - Clarence Weathers, former professional football player
- Baseball
  - Charles Johnson Jr., former professional baseball player and World Series Champion
- MMA
  - Gillian Robertson, mixed martial artist

=== Other ===
- CeeCee Lyles, flight attendant on United Airlines Flight 93
- Jacqueline Van Ovost, United States Air Force four star general
- Andre McNair, former soldier assigned to the 101st Airborne Division who passed away in a helicopter crash in 2008 in Afghanistan.
