= Upthegrove =

Upthegrove is a surname. Notable people with the surname include:

- Dave Upthegrove, American politician
- Dewitt Upthegrove, American businessman and politician
- Laura Upthegrove, 20th-century American outlaw, bank robber, bootlegger and pirate
- William Hendry Upthegrove, American army captain

== See also ==
- Op den Graeff family
- Upthegrove Beach, Florida, an unincorporated community in Okeechobee County, Florida, United States
