= Louise Gopher =

Native American activist from Florida (1945–2016)

- Born: May 25, 1945; Fort Pierce, Florida, U.S.
- Died: November 16, 2016 (aged 71)
- Citizenship: Seminole Tribe of Florida • American
- Education: Florida Atlantic University
- Relatives: Desoto Tiger (grandfather)

Louise Jones Gopher (May 25, 1945 – November 16, 2016) was the second Seminole (after Billy Cypress) and the first woman from the Seminole Tribe of Florida to earn a bachelor's degree. Gopher, a former director of education for the Seminole Tribe of Florida, was the first Seminole woman to earn a bachelor's degree when she graduated from Florida Atlantic University in 1970.

== Early life and education ==
Born May 25, 1945, in a chickee at a tribal camp in Fort Pierce, Jones spoke no English when she entered school at age 6. Because they were considered neither Black nor White, none of the segregated schools of the day would willingly take her as a student, but at the pleading of her father (who neither spoke, read, or wrote any English), Lucie County Schools Superintendent Ben L. Bryan chose to allow her to enroll in the Fairlawn School.

Louise's grandfather was Desoto Tiger, the son of Cow Creek chief Tom Tiger, who was murdered by John Ashley, also known as The King of the Everglades in 1910.

== Career ==
As Director of Education, Gopher was behind the development of the tribe's first charter school, "Pemayetv Emahakv" or "Our Way", which opened in 2007. Gopher has put great effort into preserving Seminole culture. The Seminoles’ native languages, Mvskoke or Mikasuki, are spoken only by older tribe members, so she transcribes Mikasuki teachings for posterity. In 2014 governor Rick Scott appointed her to the Florida Women's Hall of Fame. Gopher encouraged young Seminoles to attend college, and her daughter, Carla Gopher, became the first Seminole to graduate from Florida State University, in 1996.

== Recognition ==
In 2014, Gopher was granted an honorary Doctorate of Humane Letters from Florida State University. She is the third Seminole to receive an honorary degree from FSU, after Betty Mae Tiger Jumper (Doctorate of Humane Letters) and Jim Shore (Doctor of Laws). The Palm Beach Post named her one of the most 100 influential people in Florida in the 20th century.

In 2007, Jones received the Westcott Award from Florida State University.

== Death ==
She died in 2016 in Tampa.
