= Lay that Trumpet in Our Hands =

2002 novel by Susan Carol McCarthy

- Author: Susan Carol McCarthy
- Language: English
- Subject: A child's perspective of race relations during the American Civil Rights Movement
- Genre: Historical Fiction
- Published: 2002, by Bantam Books
- Publication place: United States
- Media type: Print
- Pages: 281
- Awards: Michigan Technological University Freshman Read 2009 Montcalm County, Michigan One Book-One County 2008, Michigan State University Freshman Read 2007, City of East Lansing One Book-One Community 2007, St. Johns County, Florida Reads 2007, Tampa-Hillsborough Reads 2005, Chautauqua South Fiction Award 2003, San Diego Magazine's Book Award for Fiction 2003, Deadly Pleasures' Best U.S. First Novel 2002
- ISBN: 978-0-553-80169-9

Lay that Trumpet in Our Hands is a 2002 novel by Susan Carol McCarthy. It describes the efforts of Reesa McMahon, a 12-year-old white girl, to understand and come to terms with the murder of her black friend Marvin Cully at the hands of the Ku Klux Klan. It details her growing awareness of race relations and racial hatred against the backdrop of the American Civil Rights Movement.
