= Upthegrove Beach, Florida =

Unincorporated community in Florida, US

Upthegrove Beach
- Unincorporated community
- Location within the state of Florida
- Coordinates: 27°10′34″N 80°43′35″W
- Country: United States
- State: Florida
- County: Okeechobee
- Elevation: 13 ft (4.0 m)
- Time zone: UTC-5 (Eastern (EST))
  - Summer (DST): UTC-4 (EDT)
- ZIP codes: 34974
- GNIS ID: 307616

Upthegrove Beach or Up the Grove Beach is an unincorporated community in Okeechobee County, Florida, United States. It is located on US 441/US 98, on the northeastern shore of Lake Okeechobee.

== History ==
Upthegrove Beach was named for the Upthegrove (originally Op Den Graeff) family, including Union Army Captain William Hendry Upthegrove and others. Robert Upthegrove, later one of the inaugural Okeechobee County commissioners, settled in the area circa 1912. His son, Clarence Dewitt Upthegrove (Dewitt), at one time worked for Thomas Edison in Fort Myers, and later owned a heavy equipment operation that helped build the Herbert Hoover Dike around Lake Okeechobee and was the Supervisor of Elections for Palm Beach County. Another family member, Laura Upthegrove, also known as The Queen of the Everglades, was a member of the notorious Ashley Gang, and was the subject of the 1973 movie Little Laura and Big John.

The Upthegroves descended from the German Op den Graeff family of Dutch origin. They were direct descendants of Herman op den Graeff, mennonite leader of Krefeld, and his grandson Abraham op den Graeff, one of the founders of Germantown and in 1688 signer of the first protest against slavery in colonial America.
