= Desoto Tiger =

Desoto Tiger was a Seminole from a Creek-speaking camp near Indiantown, Florida, and the son of Cow Creek chief Tommy Tiger. In December 1911, Tiger was taking a bundle of ninety otter hides trapped by himself and others to market at a trading post, when he gave a ride in his canoe to John Ashley. On December 29, 1911, a dredging crew working near Lake Okeechobee discovered Tiger's body. Ashley had been seen travelling with Tiger by Tiger's uncle, Jimmy Gopher, so a group of Seminole pursued Ashley to Miami, but were too late to find him. They did, however, find the furs with unmistakable Seminole markings at Girtman Brothers fur traders in Miami, who related that they had purchased the bundle of otterskins from John Ashley for $1200. The Palm Beach County commissioners voted to offer a reward for the apprehension of Tiger's murderer, and asked then governor Albert W. Gilchrist to fund the reward, which was done in the amount of $150 on January 15, 1912. This was Ashley's first crime, and launched a career of misdeeds that earned him the name King of the Everglades.

The first trial of John Ashley, despite overwhelming evidence, failed to result in a conviction and a second trial was scheduled. Ashley escaped and ran free for some period of time before US Commissioner of Indian Affairs Cato Sells sent federal agents to assist in the search. After a subsequent arrest by Federal Special Officer Thomas E. Brents on April 27, 1914, Ashley faced trial again, but escaped (he had been allowed to move about without restraint) until Brents again captured him on February 24, 1915. In his second trial in 1915, John Ashley was sentenced to hang for the murder of Desoto Tiger, but that conviction was overturned by the Florida Supreme Court. Ashley repeatedly escaped from various local jails and eluded law enforcement until he was gunned down at the Sebastian river bridge at Roseland. Although he was frequently incarcerated for other crimes, Ashley never served any time for the murder of Desoto Tiger. The story is told in the 1973 movie Little Laura and Big John, with Desoto Tiger portrayed by Ross Kananga.

Desoto Tiger is the grandfather of Louise Gopher, the first Seminole woman to receive a bachelor's degree (from Florida Atlantic University) in 1970, and named one of the 100 most influential Floridians by the Palm Beach Post.
