= James Carlos Blake =

American writer (1943–2025)

- Born: May 26, 1943; Tampico, Tamaulipas, Mexico
- Died: January 11, 2025 (aged 81); Venice, Florida, U.S.
- Education: Saint Joseph Academy; University of South Florida (BA, MA); Bowling Green State University (MFA)
- Occupation: Writer
- Parent(s): Carlos Sebastian Blake Hernandez (1912–2002); Estrella Maria Lozano Cano (1919–?)
- Writing career
- Notable awards: Japan Adventure Fiction Association Prize (2005), Los Angeles Times Book Prize for Fiction (1997)

James Carlos Blake (May 26, 1943 – January 11, 2025) was an American writer. His work has received critical favor and several awards. He has been lauded as "one of the greatest chroniclers of the mythical American outlaw life" and as "one of the most original writers in America today and … certainly one of the bravest." He was an esteemed recipient of the University of South Florida's Distinguished Humanities Alumnus Award and a member of the Texas Institute of Letters, which he considered his crowning achievement.

== Life and career ==
Blake wrote about his boyhood in a memoir essay entitled "The Outsider" and has discussed his life and work in a profile in Texas Monthly and in a wide-ranging interview in Firsts. He was born in Tampico, Mexico on May 26, 1943, a third-generation Mexican descended from American, English, Irish, and Spanish ancestors—including a British pirate who was executed in Veracruz, Mexico—and was a naturalized American citizen. His father, Carlos Sebastian Blake Hernandez, was a civil engineer born and schooled in Mexico City. His mother, Estrella Maria Lozano Cano, was the daughter of a horse rancher and grew up on the family's ranch near Matamoros. Blake received his elementary education at St. Joseph's Academy in Brownsville, Texas and graduated from high school in Miami, Florida. After service in the U. S. Army Airborne (paratroopers), he earned BA and MA degrees at the University of South Florida Tampa Bay and an MFA degree from Bowling Green State University (Ohio), where he attended on a fellowship. He has worked as a snake-catcher, Volkswagen mechanic, swimming pool maintenance man, and county jail properties officer, but his primary occupation has been as a college instructor. He has taught at the University of South Florida, Bowling Green State University, Florida SouthWestern State College, King Fahd University of Petroleum and Minerals (Saudi Arabia), and Miami Dade College. In 1997, he left teaching to write full-time.

Blake died of pneumonia at a nursing home in Venice, Florida, on January 11, 2025, at the age of 81.

== Works ==
Although Blake wrote sporadically from his teens until his thirties, it was not until the early 1980s, while again living in Miami, that he began to write with purpose, and over the next few years he published a number of short stories in a variety of literary journals. In 1995 he published his first novel, The Pistoleer, an account of the life and times of the infamous Texas outlaw, John Wesley Hardin. Structured as a sequence of first-person narratives—each of the dozens of chapters told by a different character—the novel was hailed as "an achievement by any standards, but as a first novel is simply astounding." It was a finalist for the 1995 Best Novel of the West award from the Western Writers of America. Despite its "western" setting, it was recognized as a significant literary work presenting not only the story of the title character, but also, through its vast array of narrators, a cultural mosaic of the South in the era of Reconstruction. The Pistoleer introduced several motifs that would recur in much of Blake's subsequent work—violence as art; honor and morality as existential codes; character as fate (a Heraclitean notion that Blake himself has cited as a pervasive theme in his fiction.); and the outlaw as media celebrity.

In the ten years following the publication of The Pistoleer, Blake published eight more novels and a collection of short works, plus more short stories and two memoir essays. In 1997 his third novel, In the Rogue Blood, gained him considerable attention and won the prestigious Los Angeles Times Book Prize for Fiction. Dealing with the misadventures of a pair of American brothers during the time of the U.S. war with Mexico in the late 1840s, In the Rogue Blood is generally regarded as one of the most compelling works in recent American literature to treat violence as a primary engine of U.S. history. It has been widely compared to Cormac McCarthy's savage masterpiece, Blood Meridian.

While most of Blake's short stories—and a novella, "Texas Woman Blues" — are set in recent times, his four latest books, The Rules of Wolfe (2013), The House of Wolfe (2015), The Ways of Wolfe (2017), and The Bones of Wolfe (2020) are his first contemporary novels. All of his previous novels are set between the mid-19th-century and the late 1930s, and several of them feature historical figures as protagonists. In addition to Wes Hardin, his novels have centered on Pancho Villa, the Mexican bandit and revolutionary (The Friends of Pancho Villa); John Ashley of the notorious Ashley criminal gang in early twentieth-century Florida (Red Grass River); "Bloody Bill" Anderson, the Missouri guerrilla captain of the American Civil War (Wildwood Boys); Harry Pierpont, the 1930s gangster and leader of a band of bank robbers that included John Dillinger (Handsome Harry); and Stanley Ketchel, the ragtime-era boxing champion who was murdered at age twenty-four (The Killings of Stanley Ketchel). Even in those of his novels whose protagonists are created of whole cloth (In the Rogue Blood, A World of Thieves, Under the Skin, Country of the Bad Wolfes), real-life people play significant or cameo roles.

== Cultural significance ==
Several of Blake's works have been published in foreign editions, and some are under film option, including The Killings of Stanley Ketchel, which was optioned by Terence Winter, writer and executive producer of The Sopranos and creator of Boardwalk Empire. The Friends of Pancho Villa was going to be turned into a movie by director Emir Kusturica, starring Johnny Depp in the leading role, but Depp pulled out. According to Blake, Kusturica spoke to Benicio del Toro about taking over the role, but the movie ultimately did not happen.

In interviews writer/director Martin Koolhoven said Blake's novel In the Rogue Blood had an influence on his controversial Brimstone, which premiered at the Venice Film Festival in 2016. Koolhoven explained he understood he had to write a western from a female perspective after he read a certain passage about the sister of the leading characters. Also the movie features a scold's bridle, an idea he got from reading In the Rogue Blood.

== Awards ==
- 1991 – Quarterly West Novella Prize for “I, Fierro”
- 1993 – Authors in the Park National Short Story Competition Award for “Under the Sierras”
- 1997 – Los Angeles Times Book Prize for Fiction for In the Rogue Blood
- 1999 – Southwest Book Award (Border Regional Library Association) for Borderlands
- 1999 – Chautauqua South Book Award for Red Grass River
- 2005 – Japan Adventure Fiction Association Prize for A World of Thieves
- 2007 – Maltese Falcon Award (Maltese Falcon Society of Japan) for Under the Skin
- 2013 – French Grand Prix du Roman Noir Étranger for Red Grass River
- 2020 – French Prix de Beaune for Best Foreign Novel for Handsome Harry

== Other recognition ==
- 1995 – Finalist, Best Novel of the West (Western Writers of America): The Pistoleer
- 2004 – "Best Books of 2004": Entertainment Weekly: Handsome Harry
- 2013 – Finalist, Best Western Long Novel (Western Writers of America): Country of the Bad Wolfes
- 2013 – Southwest Books of the Year (Pima County Public Library): The Rules of Wolfe
- 2013 – "Best Books for Men 2013," Men's Journal: The Rules of Wolfe
- 2013 – "Year's Best Crime Novels," Booklist: The Rules of Wolfe
- 2013 – "Best Novels of the Year," Deadly Pleasures: The Rules of Wolfe
- 2014 – "The 101 Best Crime Novels of the Past Decade," Booklist: The Rules of Wolfe
- 2015 – Shortlisted for CWA Gold Dagger Award (UK): The Rules of Wolfe
- 2018 – "Top Ten Books About Gangsters," The Guardian (UK): The Rules of Wolfe

== Bibliography ==
=== Short works ===
- “Aliens in the Garden,” short story, The Sun (magazine) (October, 1987); Chapel Hill, NC
- “The House of Esperanza,” short story, The Sun (April, 1988); Chapel Hill, NC
- “A Scotsman Dies in Mexico,” short story, Voices of the Heart (1988); Ginn Press, Needham Heights, MA
- “Soldadera,” short story, Paragraph (summer, 1990); Holyoke, MA
- “Perdition Road,” short story, The Long Story (Spring, 1991); North Andover, MA;
- “Small Times,” short story, Gulf Stream Magazine (Spring, 1991); Florida International University: Miami, FL; later reprinted as “La Vida Loca”
- “I, Fierro,” novella, Quarterly West (Fall, 1991); University of Utah: Salt Lake City, Utah; includes parts of “Three Tales of the Revolution”
- “The Sharks Below,” essay, Paragraph, (Winter/Spring, 1992); Holyoke, MA
- “Three Tales of the Revolution,” short story, The Sun (April, 1993); Chapel Hill, NC
- “Under the Sierras,” short story, Fine Print (1993); Winter Park, FL
- “Runaway Horses,” short story, Saguaro (1994); University of Arizona: Tucson, AZ
- “The Outsider,” memoir essay, The Los Angeles Times Book Review, 24 May 1998
- “Referee,” short story, Smoke (Summer, 1998)
- “Texas Woman Blues,” novella, Borderlands (1999); Avon Books, New York, NY; includes “Perdition Road.”
- “Old Boys,” short story, Glimmer Train Stories (Winter, 2000); Portland, OR
- “Calendar Girl,” short story, Oxford American (Sept/Oct 2000); Oxford, MS
- “Shortcut,” memoir essay, Oxford American (Mar/Apr 2001); Oxford, MS
- “La Vida Loca,” short story, The Barcelona Review (Nov/Dec 2001); Barcelona, Spain
- “Miranda of Mazatlán,” short story, The Barcelona Review (Winter 2012/13); Barcelona, Spain
- “My Other Self,” essay, The New York Times, July 28, 2013
- “With a Pistol in My Hand,” essay, Texas Monthly, (April 2016); Austin, TX

=== Novels ===
- The Pistoleer (Berkley: New York, 1995; reissued Grove Press, New York, 2016)
- The Friends of Pancho Villa (Berkley: New York, 1996; reissued Grove Press, New York, 2017)
- In the Rogue Blood (Avon: New York, 1997)
- Red Grass River (Avon: New York, 1998)
- Wildwood Boys (William Morrow: New York, 2000)
- A World of Thieves (William Morrow: New York, 2002)
- Under the Skin (William Morrow: New York, 2003)
- Handsome Harry (William Morrow: New York, 2004)
- The Killings of Stanley Ketchel (William Morrow: New York, 2005)
- Country of the Bad Wolfes (Cinco Puntos Press: El Paso, 2012; reissued Grove Press, New York, 2020)
- The Rules of Wolfe (Mysterious Press/Grove Atlantic: New York, 2013)
- The House of Wolfe (Mysterious Press/Grove Atlantic: New York, 2015)
- The Ways of Wolfe (Mysterious Press/Grove Atlantic: New York, 2017)
- The Bones of Wolfe (Mysterious Press/Grove Atlantic: New York, 2020)

=== Collections of short works ===
- Borderlands (Avon Books: New York, 1999; reissued Grove Press, New York, 2017)
