= Little Laura and Big John =

1973 American feature film

- Directed by: Luke Moberly; Bob Woodburn
- Written by: Luke Moberly; Bob Woodburn
- Based on: story by Phillip Weilding
- Produced by: Lou Wiethe
- Starring: Fabian Forte; Karen Black; Paul Gleason
- Cinematography: H. Edmund Gibson
- Edited by: Tom Woodburn
- Music by: Bill Walker
- Production company: Louis Wiethe Productions
- Distributed by: Crown International
- Release date: 11 May 1973
- Running time: 82 mins
- Country: United States
- Language: English
- Budget: $200,000

Little Laura and Big John is a 1973 American feature film about the exploits of the Ashley gang in the Florida everglades in the 1910s and 1920s.

== Plot ==
Loosely based on the true story about Laura Upthegrove and John Ashley. Laura's mother, Emma Upthegrove tells the story of her daughter and John Ashley. John goes into a life of crime after he accidentally shoots a Seminole, Desoto Tiger.

== Historical narrative ==
In December 1929, Ashley murdered Seminole trapper Desoto Tiger, whose body was discovered by a crew building the Hoover Dike around Lake Okeechobee. A few days later, Ashley sold Tiger's otter furs in Miami. In one of the first instances of a jury of whites convicting a white for the murder of an Indian, Ashley was convicted for murder, but was repeatedly allowed to escape custody, whereupon he began his life of crime. Although he spent jail time for many other crimes, he never served a day for the murder of Desoto Tiger.

== Cast ==
- Fabian Forte as John Ashley
- Karen Black as Laura
- Ivy Thayer as Laura's mother
- Ross Kananga as Desoto Tiger
- Ken Miller as Hanford Mobley
- Paul Gleason as Sheriff Bob Baker
- Cliff Frates as Young John
- Jerry Rhodes as Bob Ashley
- Ray Barrett as Cates

== Production ==
=== Development ===
Plans to make the film were announced in 1968 by Luke Moberly, who owned a studio near Fort Lauderdale.

Moberly later wrote "twenty-eight features came and went from my place and hundreds of commercials before I realized I had nothing more to show for it than a lot of deferments owed me, and buildings full of equipment. All the little ones I helped went out of business and the ones who made it left and forgot me. I was deciding whether to sell out at offers around a half-million and forget the business or make films myself and try for broke.

He read a story of the history of Florida by Philip Weidling and became interested with the bank robber, John Ashley. He asked Weidling to write the true story of Ashley for him. "I wrote a screenplay from it and scouted locations that were factual and even built eleven sets for it before I had any money to make it", he said.

Moberley met a former theatre owner named Louis Wiethe who was interested in investing himself and raising the balance to shoot it. They produced the film together and Moberley directed.

=== Casting ===
Wiethe and Moberley went to California to cast the leads. "We had some beautiful offers from name actors, but the only one I regret not using was Burt Reynolds", said Moberley. "He would have made a beautiful John Ashley, plus the fact that I would have had the two hottest young stars in the country in my very first feature."

Moberley said he became interested in Karen Black after seeing her photo. She "had never played a lead role, but I thought she looked like what I needed. I read a few pages of the script with her and said, "That's all I need to hear, you've got the part."

By February 1969 it was announced that Fabian and Karen Black were to play the leads.

=== Shooting ===
Filming began 10 March 1969 on location in Stuart, Florida, in and around Martin County, and at Moberly Film Studios in Fort Lauderdale.

Moberley recalls "Most of the people working with me wondered where I got that kookie little hippie girl, but by the end of the first day's shooting, I was convinced she would be my film and outshine everyone else. Most everyone was mad at me for changing the script every day and the feeling got to be that I was in total confusion and didn't know what I was doing. I guess that happens to most all new film directors. Before the film was over, they all began to realize Karen was stealing the scenes. "

Additional footage was later shot, including filming a nude scene at the public beach at the House of Refuge in Martin County.

== Release ==
The original title of the film was The True Story of the Ashley-Mobley Gang. Then it was Too Soon to Laugh, Too Late to Cry before becoming Little Laura and Big John.

Moberley said "We held our film back till Karen became one of the hottest properties around."

Crown International bought the rights to the movie which was not released until 1973. When the film came out Moberley said "I am grateful to Karen Black, although she has forgotten me the same as the others who made it."

The film marked the first time Fabian was credited as "Fabian Forte."

Moberley later said "After working in the early 1900 era with all of the antique cars and clothes, I tried to write another period picture about the rum runners, but just couldn't come up with something I thought the young people would buy. "

== See also ==
- List of American films of 1973
