= In the Rogue Blood =

Historical novel by James Carlos Blake

- First edition cover
- Author: James Carlos Blake
- Language: English
- Genre: Western, historical fiction
- Publisher: HarperCollins
- Publication date: 1997
- Publication place: United States
- Media type: Print (hard and paperback)
- Pages: 344
- ISBN: 9780380974924

In the Rogue Blood is a novel by the American author James Carlos Blake, published in January 1997. It follows two brothers during the Mexican–American War. A Western, the book is noted for its depiction of violence. It won the Los Angeles Times Book Prize for Fiction in 1997.

== Plot ==
In 1845, sixteen-year-old Edward Little is living with his family in the wilderness outside Pensacola, Florida. Originally from Georgia, they migrated to Florida after the father, referred to as Daddyjack, stabbed a man for looking at his wife. Daddyjack abuses his wife and daughter, while teaching Edward and his brother John to fight and hunt. When their sister, Margaret, goes missing, presumed runaway, the boys search for her in town. Unable to find her, they return to a fight between their parents. Edward kills Daddyjack in self defense. The brothers depart together with the aim of making it to Texas.

Edward and John are separated when they both get into altercations: Edward kills a French officer, while John is arrested after attempting to rescue Margaret when he finds her in a whore house. The brothers each participate in the Mexican-American War. John serves with the US Army under General Zachary Taylor, before deserting to fight for Mexico under the Saint Patrick's Battalion. Edward takes up with bandits and assists US forces. He comes across Margaret in a wagon train full of prostitutes. Edward later finds John beaten and hung by American soldiers and buries him.

== Reception ==
Jesse Sublett of The Austin Chronicle likened the book to Blood Meridian by Cormac McCarthy and called it "quite likely the most violent book in American literature". In Texas Monthly, Jan Reid praised Carlos Blake as a gifted writer, also drawing comparisons to McCarthy, but criticized some of the prose as "overwritten" and faulted the book for lacking any strong female characters. The novel won the Los Angeles Times’ Book Prize for Fiction in 1997.
