= Falmouth, Jamaica =

Town in Trelawny, Jamaica

Falmouth Falmot
- Historic Town
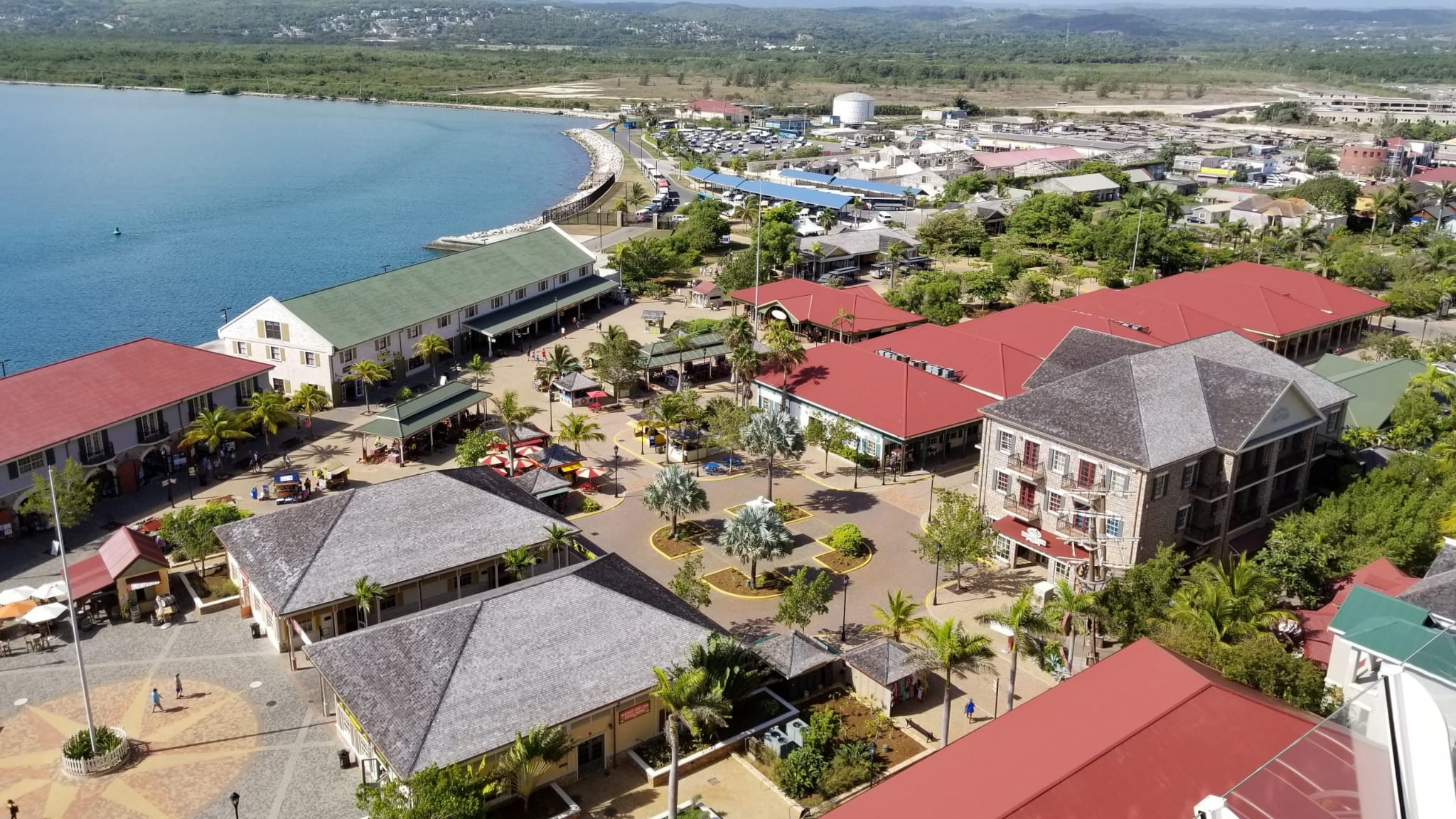

- Location within Jamaica
- Coordinates: 18.490°N 77.661°W
- Country: Jamaica
- Parish: Trelawny
- Founded: 1769
- Founder: Don Rafael Matas
- Named for: Falmouth, Cornwall, England

Falmouth (Jamaican Patois: Falmot) is the chief town and capital of the parish of Trelawny in Jamaica. It is situated on Jamaica's north coast 29 km (18 miles) east of Montego Bay. It is noted for being one of the Caribbean's best-preserved Georgian towns.

The town was meticulously planned from the start, with wide streets in a regular grid, adequate water supply, and glorious public buildings. It had piped water earlier than New York City.

== History ==
Founded by Thomas Reid in 1769, Falmouth flourished as a market centre and port for forty years at a time when Jamaica was the world's leading sugar producer. It was named after the town of the same name in Cornwall, which was the birthplace of governor of Jamaica Sir William Trelawny, who was instrumental in its establishment. Falmouth was built upon the coast of Trelawny at a place previously known as Martha Brae Point. In 1774, there was only one dwelling in the port of Falmouth, and by 1781 there were only between 8-10 houses there. However, by 1793 the port had expanded rapidly to the point where there were over 150 dwellings there.

During the late nineteenth and early twentieth centuries, Falmouth was one of the busiest ports in colonial Jamaica. It was home to masons, carpenters, tavern keepers, sailors, planters and people of other occupations. It was a wealthy town in a prosperous parish with a diverse ethnic mixture. Within the parish, nearly one hundred plantations were continuously producing sugar and rum for export to Europe. Jamaica, during this period, had become the world's leading sugar producer.

All the above made Falmouth a central hub of the triangular trade in the Atlantic, with the town's economy based almost entirely on slavery. In Falmouth Harbour, as many as 30 merchant ships could be seen on any given day, many of them Guineamen transporting slaves from Africa or rum and sugar manufacture produced on nearby plantations for export to Europe as part of the triangular trade.

As a result, starting in 1840, Falmouth's fortunes as a commercial centre declined after the passage of the 1833 Slavery Abolition Act. This decline, and lack of support for development, have left many of its early buildings standing. The streets are lined with many small houses known for their unique fretwork and windows, major merchant and planter complexes, and commercial buildings, all dating from 1790 to 1840.

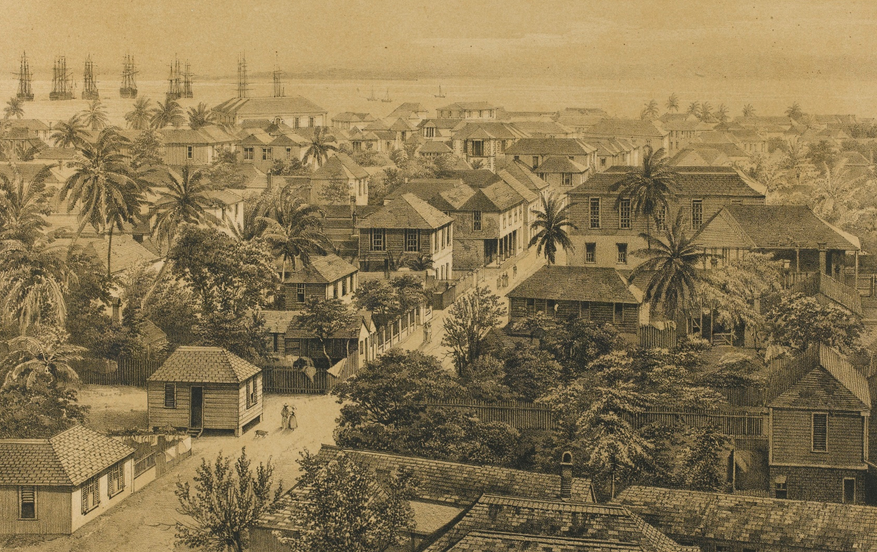
Falmouth in the 1840s by Adolphe Duperly

While Falmouth saw little commercial advancement after the 1840s, houses continued to be built. The town's buildings, the old and the not-so-old, make up the historic townscape of Falmouth. These shared characteristics weave the varied building styles into a distinctive pattern of early Jamaican architecture, and a critical mass of each variety makes the town an unusually distinctive place.

Places of interest include the Albert George Shopping and Historical Centre, dating from 1895; the former residences of planters John Tharp and Edward Barrett; and the St Peter's Anglican Church, built in 1795.

The town suffered extensive damage as a result of Hurricane Melissa in 2025. The infirmary, courthouse, and road and works department were all destroyed.

== Infrastructural development ==
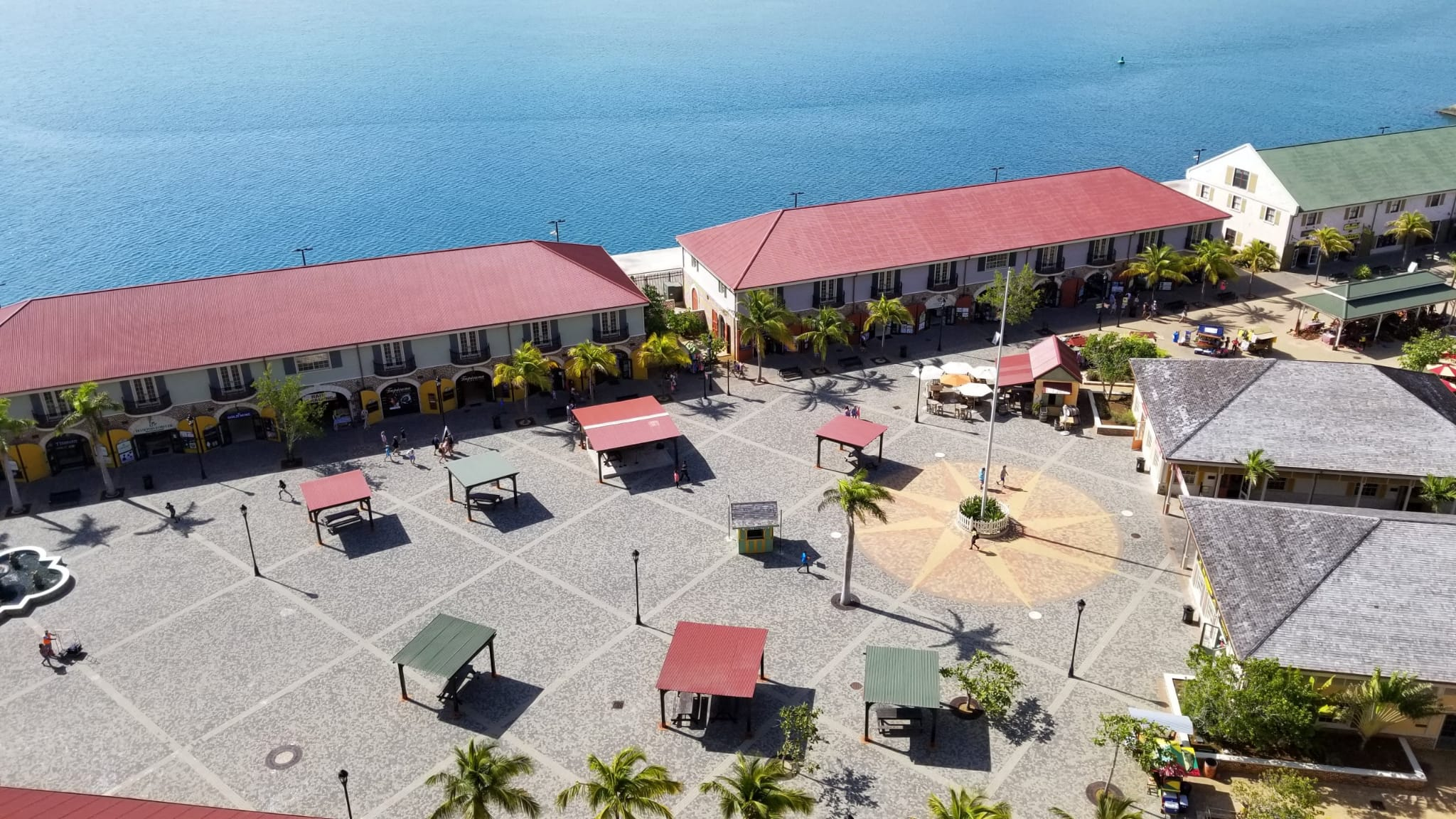
Plaza in Falmouth, photo taken from the cruise ship Harmony of the Seas

A new $180 million port was built to accommodate the newest and largest cruise ships, including Royal Caribbean International's Oasis class. The port opened in early 2011

Falmouth was the site of the opening ceremony for the ICC 2007 Cricket World Cup. The ceremony was held in the newly constructed Greenfield Stadium about 5 km (3 miles) from the town centre.

== Notable people ==
- Usain Bolt – Olympian sprinter and world record holder.
- Veronica Campbell-Brown – Olympian sprinter.
- Ben Johnson (Canadian sprinter) – Olympian and former world record holder.
- Luther Blissett – former footballer for England, Watford, AC Milan and AFC Bournemouth.
- Ky-Mani Marley – reggae artist and son of Bob Marley.
- Anita Belnavis – former Jamaica and Caribbean table tennis champion, mother of Ky-Mani Marley.
- Rex Nettleford – Rhodes Scholar, academic, former Vice Chancellor of the University of the West Indies.
- Hugh Shearer – former Prime Minister of Jamaica.

== Historic architecture ==
Falmouth has a number of interesting historic buildings in the Jamaican Georgian architectural style which are in need of preservation and restoration. One organization that has taken an interest in this work is Falmouth Heritage Renewal (falmouthjamaica.org), a United States–based non-profit organization.

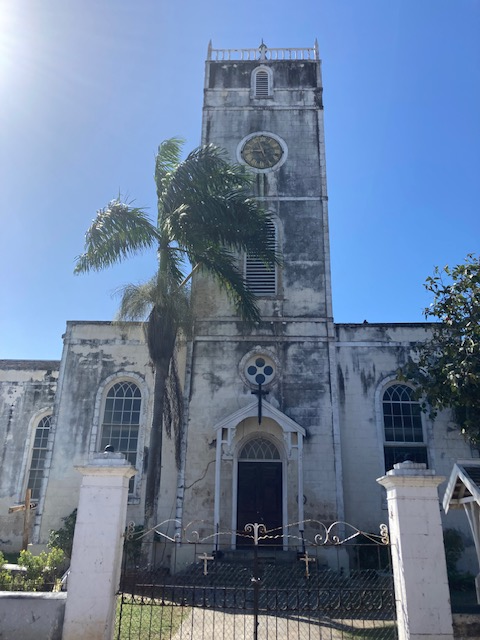
St Peter's Church

Buildings of note include:

- Falmouth Court House
- St Peter's Anglican Church is one of the oldest in Jamaica. Its supporting columns are of solid mahogany and its floor is inlaid with crosses of mahoe and mahogany.
- Falmouth All-Age School is housed in a former army barracks, Fort Balcarres.
- Greenwood Great House (which once belonged to the Barretts of Wimpole Street, London) now houses the largest collection of rare musical instruments in the island.
- Falmouth Post Office which is located on Market Street. It is in need of repair, but is still a functioning building from the Georgian era. A number of old colonial buildings on Market Street are from this period, however, they have not been kept in good condition throughout the years and are generally in a state of decay.

== Tourism ==
=== The Glistening Waters ===
The Glistening Waters is located in Falmouth's Luminous Lagoon, where the Martha Brae River and the waters of the Caribbean Sea meet. The mixture of these two bodies of water create bioluminescence micro-organisms that when disturbed at night glow brightly. The Glistening Waters is only one of four such locations in the world and the only location where the luminary reaction can be seen 365 days of the year regardless of the temperature or the weather.

=== Jamaica Swamp Safari Village ===
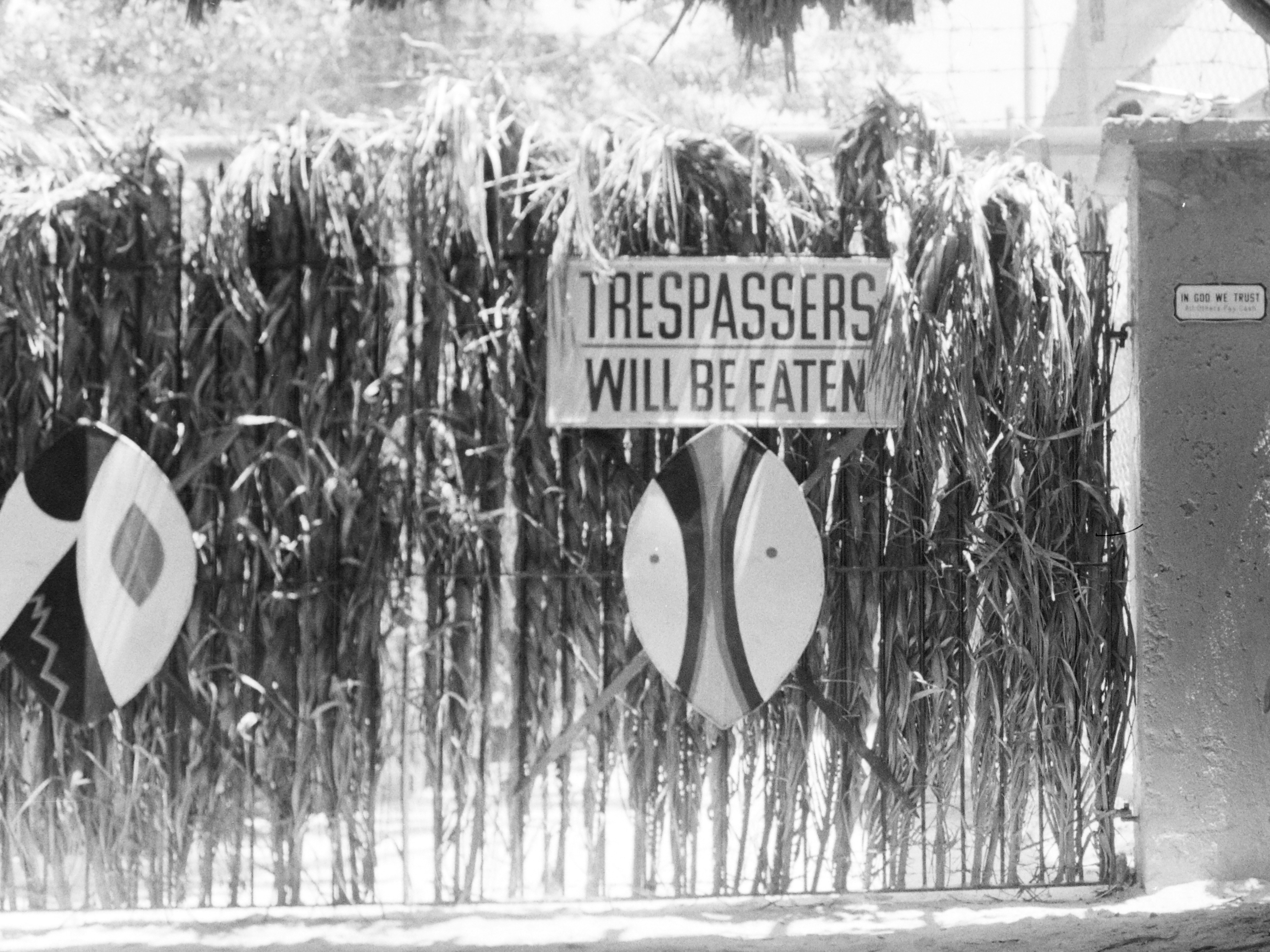
"Trespassers Will Be Eaten" sign at the gate to Jamaica Swamp Safari Village, which was the film location for the 1973 James Bond film, Live and Let Die (photo from 1974).

The Jamaica Swamp Safari Village is a 20.3-hectare (50-acre) wildlife sanctuary located in Falmouth, which was initially established as a crocodile farm in 1 hectare (2 acres) of virgin mangrove territory by Ross Kananga in 1969, and which he changed to a sanctuary under the name Jamaica Swamp Safari and opened to the public in 1970. It featured as a crocodile farm and drug lab in the 1973 James Bond film, Live and let Die, and the film's main Bond villain, Dr. Kananga, was named after him.
