= Ross Kananga =

American crocodile farmer and stunt man

Ross William Heilman (June 7, 1945 – January 30, 1978), better known as Ross Kananga, was a crocodile farm owner and stunt man, best known for his appearance in the 1973 James Bond movie Live and Let Die.

== Early life ==
Ross Kananga was born on June 7, 1945, in Lorain, Ohio, as Ross William Heilman. He was born to restaurateurs Hubert Ross Heilman and Dorothy Lane Heilman, who were owners of Heilman's Restaurants Inc. in Fort Lauderdale. Kananga claimed part Seminole heritage and changed his name at an early age.

After graduating from Fort Lauderdale High School, Kananga joined the U.S. Marines. Following his service, Ross visited South America where it was reported he became a "big game hunter".

Kananga had been living in Florida when, in 1969, he left the country for Jamaica. Kananga established a crocodile farm in 1 hectare (2 acres) of virgin mangrove territory in Falmouth. By late 1970, with the help of locals whom he befriended, Kananga opened the Jamaica Swamp Safari. It featured hundreds of American crocodiles, three American alligators, a python, a pair of lions, and a chimpanzee. Kananga had a particularly close relationship with a pair of black leopards whom he named Angel and Satan.

Kananga oversaw daily shows where locals and tourists would watch him play with the leopards and lions and wrestle the crocodiles and alligators.

== Live and Let Die ==
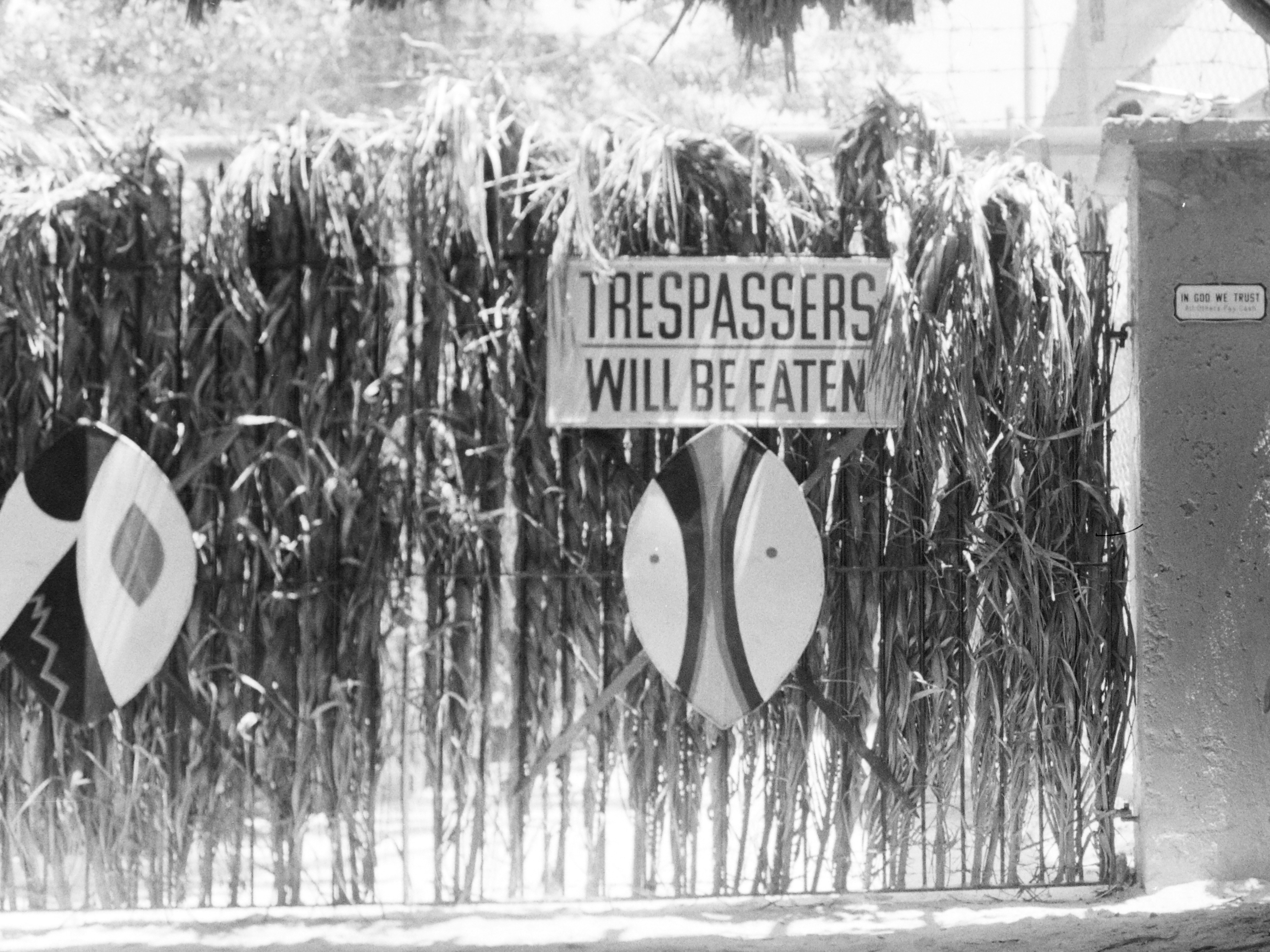
Trespassers Will Be Eaten – Gate to Jamaica Safari Village in Falmouth, Jamaica, film location of the crocodile farm / drug lab in the 1973 James Bond film Live and Let Die (photo from 1974).

In 1972, whilst searching for a suitable location for the James Bond film Live and Let Die, location scouts were intrigued by a sign which read, "Trespassers Will Be Eaten". After meeting with Kananga, they were convinced the Swamp Safari should be used as part of the fictional San Monique. The charismatic Kananga inspired screenplay writer Tom Mankiewicz to name the film's main Bond villain, Dr. Kananga, played by Yaphet Kotto in the film.

Kananga suggested the stunt of Bond (played by Roger Moore) jumping on crocodiles, and was enlisted by the producers to perform it. The scene required five takes to complete, including one in which the last crocodile snapped at Kananga's heel, tearing his trousers and causing him a number of injuries; one required 193 stitches. Kananga was paid $60,000 for his contribution.

== Further work ==
Kananga appeared in the 1970 movie Devil Rider! as a motorcycle rider. He featured in Little Laura and Big John, a 1973 feature film about the exploits of the Ashley gang in the Florida Everglades in the 1910s and 1920s. He worked as a stuntman in the 1973 movie Papillon, which was also shot on location at the Swamp Safari.

== Later life and death ==
Kananga returned to live in South Florida in 1976. He trained wild animals at the Seminole Indian Village in Broward County. The same year, various news reports described Kananga being attacked by his male leopard Satan, and how he was saved by 19-year-old Brenda Surles, who was forced to shoot the animal on Kananga’s orders. Surles only wounded the animal. Kananga killed the animal before collapsing. Surles was also required to shoot and kill Satan's partner, Angel, who had escaped into the Seminole Village tourist park. Kananga was taken to a hospital and treated for many wounds in his neck and back.

Kananga died of a cardiac arrest while spearfishing in Collier County in the Everglades in 1978, aged 32.

Author Paul Stenning announced in 2020 that he was working on a biography of Kananga and invited those who knew him or had information on Kananga to contact him via his website.
