= Canal Point, Florida =

- CDP
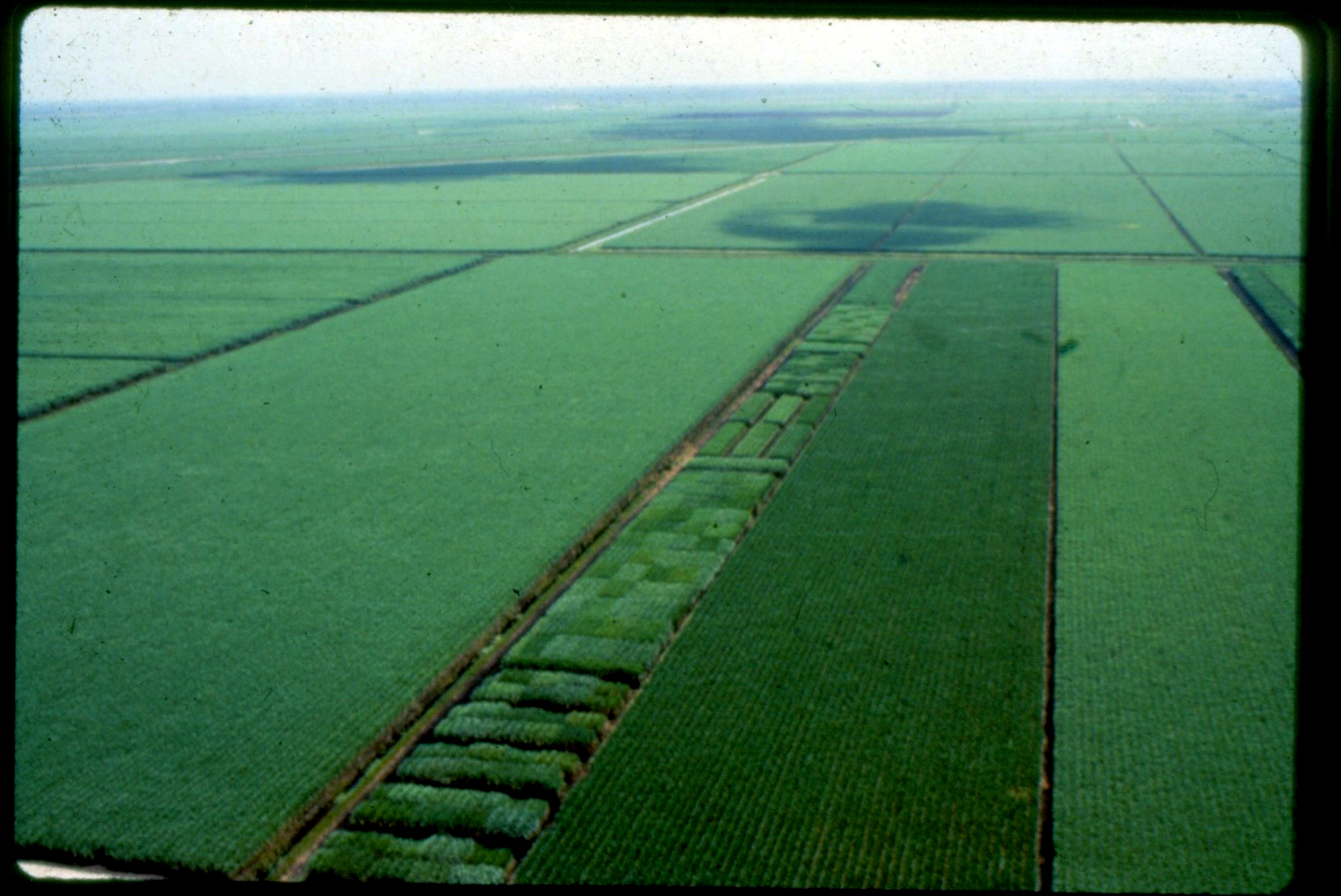
- View of sugarcane in Canal Point, Florida
- Interactive map of Canal Point, Florida
- Coordinates: 26°51′43″N 80°37′32″W
- Country: United States
- State: Florida
- County: Palm Beach

Area
  - Total: 1.39 sq mi (3.60 km^{2})
  - Land: 1.39 sq mi (3.60 km^{2})
  - Water: 0 sq mi (0.00 km^{2})
- Elevation: 10 ft (3.0 m)

Population (2020)
  - Total: 344
  - Density: 247.1/sq mi (95.42/km^{2})
- Time zone: UTC-5 (Eastern (EST))
  - Summer (DST): UTC-4 (EDT)
- ZIP code: 33438
- Area codes: 561, 728
- FIPS code: 12-10100
- GNIS feature ID: 2402745

Canal Point is a census-designated place (CDP) and unincorporated community in Palm Beach County, Florida, United States. It is part of the Miami metropolitan area. Canal Point has a population of 344 people counted in the 2020 US census.

== History ==
Archaeological evidence from Big Mound City, located roughly 10 mi (16 km) of Canal Point, suggests that the Calusa tribe inhabited the area between about 500 BCE and 1650 CE. In 1909, Canal Point became the first White settlement on the eastern shore of Lake Okeechobee. The Southern States Land and Timber Company began planting sugarcane in the area in 1917. Around that time, the West Palm Beach Canal was completed. The canal connected Lake Okeechobee at Canal Point to West Palm Beach, allowing farms to sell crops to West Palm Beach or elsewhere in the United States via the Florida East Coast Railway. Transportation of crops by motor vehicle from the area to other destinations began in 1924 with the completion of Conners Highway, which mostly followed the path of the West Palm Beach Canal.

Unlike other communities along the southeastern and eastern shores of Lake Okeechobee, Canal Point was relatively unscathed by the 1928 hurricane. The community was likely inundated with 1.5 to 2.5 ft (0.46 to 0.76 m) of water and one death occurred. However, the local economy suffered greatly and never recovered after construction of the Herbert Hoover Dike limited boat traffic in the 1930s. Residents saved the historic Canal Point School from demolition and hoped to convert it into an agricultural museum, but the building was destroyed by a fire in 2008. About three years earlier, Hurricane Wilma wrecked several other historic buildings in the community.

== Geography ==
According to the United States Census Bureau, the CDP has a total area of 1.5 square miles (3.9 km^{2}), all land.

Canal Point is located along the eastern shore of Lake Okeechobee, to the northeast of Pahokee and to the northwest of Bryant.

=== Climate ===
Canal Point has a tropical wet and dry climate (Köppen: Aw), with hot summers and warm to mild winters.

Climate data for Canal Point, Florida, 1991–2020 normals, extremes 1953–present
Month	Jan	Feb	Mar	Apr	May	Jun	Jul	Aug	Sep	Oct	Nov	Dec	Year
Record high °F (°C)	90 (32)	90 (32)	94 (34)	97 (36)	99 (37)	98 (37)	100 (38)	99 (37)	98 (37)	96 (36)	93 (34)	94 (34)	100 (38)
Mean maximum °F (°C)	85.1 (29.5)	85.7 (29.8)	88.5 (31.4)	91.5 (33.1)	93.5 (34.2)	94.9 (34.9)	95.7 (35.4)	95.6 (35.3)	94.4 (34.7)	91.7 (33.2)	87.8 (31.0)	85.9 (29.9)	96.5 (35.8)
Mean daily maximum °F (°C)	74.2 (23.4)	77.4 (25.2)	80.2 (26.8)	85.2 (29.6)	88.7 (31.5)	91.0 (32.8)	92.2 (33.4)	92.2 (33.4)	90.5 (32.5)	86.8 (30.4)	80.9 (27.2)	76.8 (24.9)	84.7 (29.3)
Daily mean °F (°C)	65.6 (18.7)	68.3 (20.2)	71.1 (21.7)	75.5 (24.2)	79.3 (26.3)	83.0 (28.3)	84.0 (28.9)	84.2 (29.0)	83.0 (28.3)	79.3 (26.3)	73.1 (22.8)	68.7 (20.4)	76.3 (24.6)
Mean daily minimum °F (°C)	57.1 (13.9)	59.2 (15.1)	62.0 (16.7)	65.8 (18.8)	69.8 (21.0)	75.0 (23.9)	75.7 (24.3)	76.2 (24.6)	75.5 (24.2)	71.7 (22.1)	65.3 (18.5)	60.5 (15.8)	67.8 (19.9)
Mean minimum °F (°C)	40.6 (4.8)	43.3 (6.3)	49.0 (9.4)	54.1 (12.3)	61.1 (16.2)	68.0 (20.0)	70.4 (21.3)	70.7 (21.5)	69.5 (20.8)	61.1 (16.2)	51.5 (10.8)	45.5 (7.5)	38.5 (3.6)
Record low °F (°C)	25 (−4)	29 (−2)	31 (−1)	41 (5)	48 (9)	53 (12)	62 (17)	61 (16)	60 (16)	42 (6)	38 (3)	25 (−4)	25 (−4)
Average precipitation inches (mm)	2.37 (60)	1.94 (49)	2.86 (73)	4.25 (108)	3.91 (99)	8.38 (213)	6.53 (166)	9.19 (233)	8.06 (205)	3.73 (95)	2.18 (55)	2.06 (52)	55.46 (1,408)
Average precipitation days (≥ 0.01 in)	6.2	5.5	5.7	5.6	6.9	13.8	12.9	14.3	13.4	8.2	5.2	5.6	103.3
Source: NOAA

== Demographics ==
Historical population
Census	Pop.	Note	%±
2000	525		—
2010	367		−30.1%
2020	344		−6.3%
U.S. Decennial Census

=== 2020 census ===
Cabana Colony racial composition (Hispanics excluded from racial categories) (NH = Non-Hispanic)
Race	Number	Percentage
White (NH)	107	31.10%
Black or African American (NH)	50	14.53%
Native American or Alaska Native (NH)	0	0.00%
Asian (NH)	1	0.29%
Pacific Islander or Native Hawaiian (NH)	0	0.00%
Some Other Race (NH)	0	0.00%
Mixed/Multiracial (NH)	3	0.87%
Hispanic or Latino	183	53.19%
Total	344	

As of the 2020 United States census, there were 344 people, 107 households, and 81 families residing in the CDP.

=== 2010 census ===
Cabana Colony racial composition (Hispanics excluded from racial categories) (NH = Non-Hispanic)
Race	Number	Percentage
White (NH)	177	48.23%
Black or African American (NH)	74	20.16%
Native American or Alaska Native (NH)	1	0.27%
Asian (NH)	0	0.00%
Pacific Islander or Native Hawaiian (NH)	0	0.00%
Some Other Race (NH)	6	1.63%
Mixed/Multiracial (NH)	0	0.00%
Hispanic or Latino	109	29.70%
Total	367	

As of the 2010 United States census, there were 367 people, 91 households, and 35 families residing in the CDP.

=== 2000 census ===
As of the census of 2000, there were 525 people, 197 households, and 127 families residing in the CDP. The population density was 339.3 inhabitants per square mile (131.0/km^{2}). There were 227 housing units at an average density of 146.7 per square mile (56.6/km^{2}). The racial makeup of the CDP was 55.05% White (43.1% were Non-Hispanic White), 17.52% African American, 0.38% Native American, 0.57% Asian, 0.19% Pacific Islander, 21.14% from other races, and 5.14% from two or more races. Hispanic or Latino of any race were 35.05% of the population.

As of 2000, there were 197 households, out of which 34.5% had children under the age of 18 living with them, 45.2% were [married couples living together, 13.7% had a female householder with no husband present, and 35.5% were non-families. 29.4% of all households were made up of individuals, and 9.1% had someone living alone who was 65 years of age or older. The average household size was 2.66 and the average family size was 3.38.

In 2000, in the CDP, the population was spread out, with 30.5% under the age of 18, 7.6% from 18 to 24, 29.1% from 25 to 44, 23.0% from 45 to 64, and 9.7% who were 65 years of age or older. The median age was 34 years. For every 100 females, there were 95.9 males. For every 100 females age 18 and over, there were 108.6 males.

In 2000, the median income for a household in the CDP was $37,813, and the median income for a family was $29,792. Males had a median income of $32,232 versus $12,283 for females. The per capita income for the CDP was $18,625. About 19.5% of families and 14.4% of the population were below the poverty line, including 11.8% of those under age 18 and 7.8% of those age 65 or over.

As of 2000, English as a first language accounted for 65.00% of all residents, while Spanish is the first language of 35.00% of the population.

== Living ==
Almost the entirety of Canal Point's populace is involved in agriculture. Most are independent farmers or employees of one of the large local sugar co-operatives, the largest three being the US Sugar Corporation, Osceola Farms, and Fanjul Sugar. The town has an access point to the Lake Okeechobee Scenic Trail.

== Transportation ==
The Palm Tran Route 47 used to connect Canal Point to Belle Glade and South Bay(previously) via Pahokee as well as to Route 40, which links Belle Glade to Wellington. State Road 15 and US routes 98 and 441 move jointly northeastward through Canal Point, generally parallel to the shore of Lake Okeechobee, with the road locally referred to as E. Main Street. The road is adjoined by the northwest-southeast moving State Road 700, locally known as W. Main Street and Conners Highway, just south of the West Palm Beach Canal. State Road 700 moves southeastward and rejoins State Road 15 and US routes 98 and 441 near Twentymile Bend.

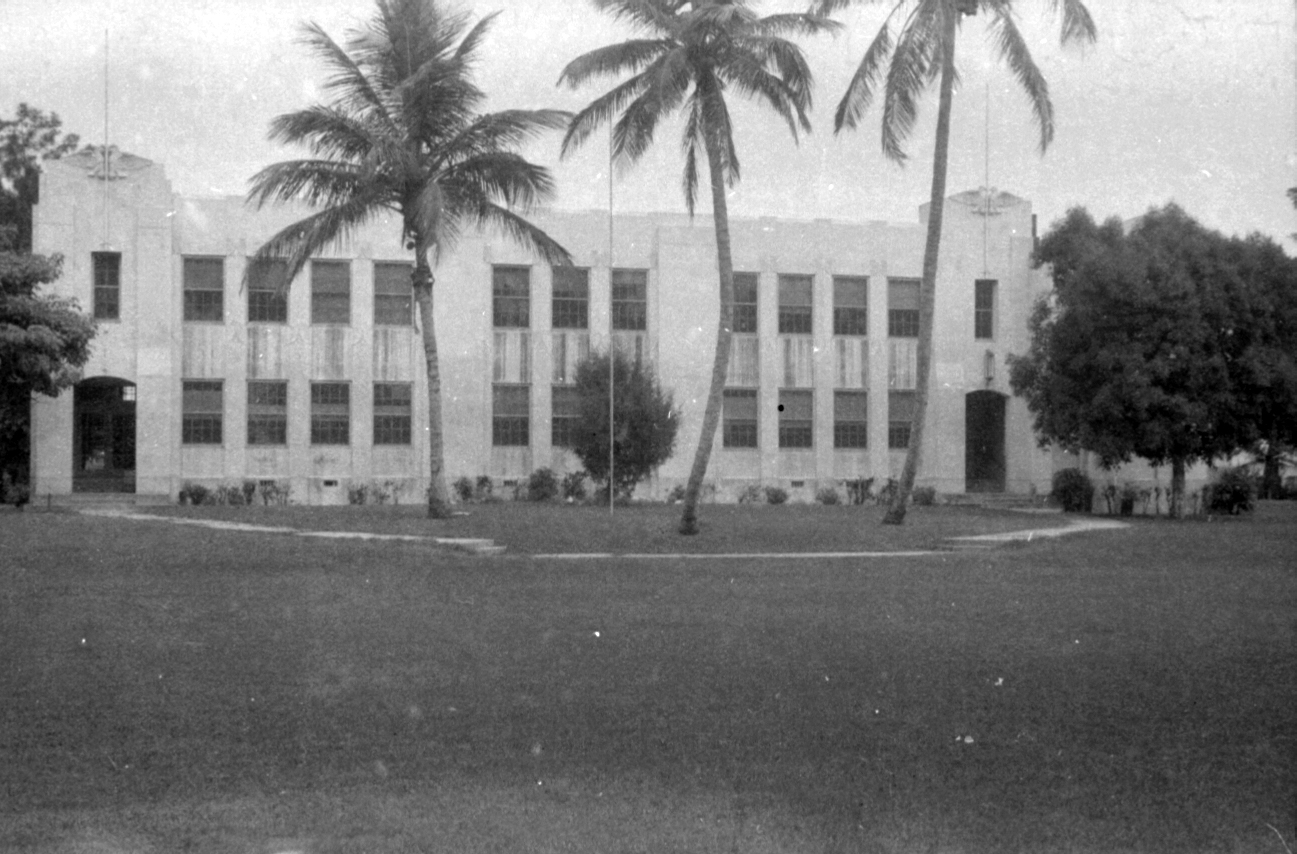
View of Canal Point Elementary School, circa July 1953. This building burned down on June 17, 2008.

== Education ==
- Kathryn E. Cunningham/Canal Point Elementary School is the only school located in Canal Point. The school was named for former principal, Kathryn E. Cunningham, who retired from education after 50 years. Cunningham was instrumental in getting the school built and a supporter of children's education her entire life.
- Pahokee Middle School
- Pahokee High School

There are no colleges or universities in Canal Point. However, Palm Beach State College has campuses in Belle Glade and Loxahatchee Groves.

== Notable people ==
- Anquan Boldin, former NFL wide receiver for four teams, raised in Canal Point.
- Laura Upthegrove, "Queen of the Everglades", famous outlaw and bank robber

== Images ==
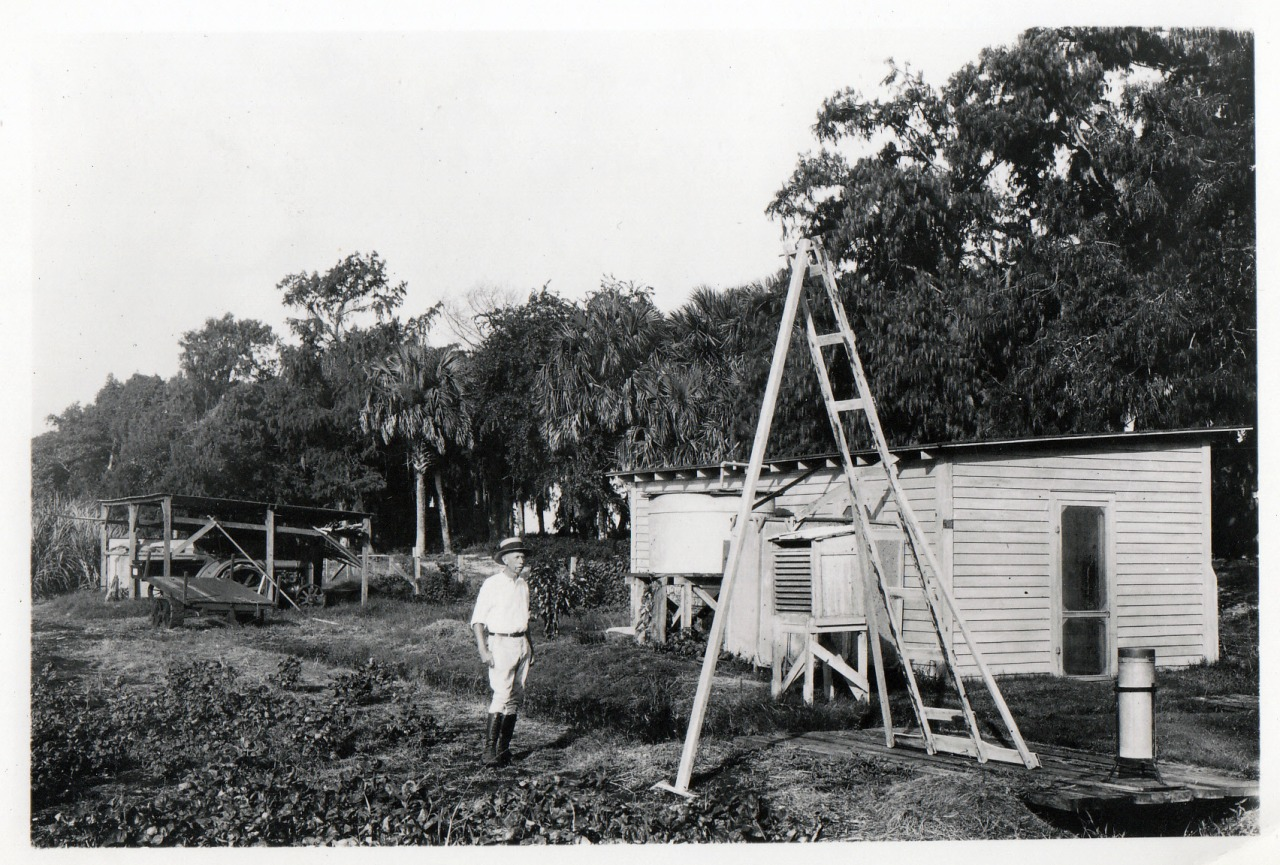
Original lab/office building constructed at U.S. Sugar Plant Field Station, Canal Point, Florida, August 1922.

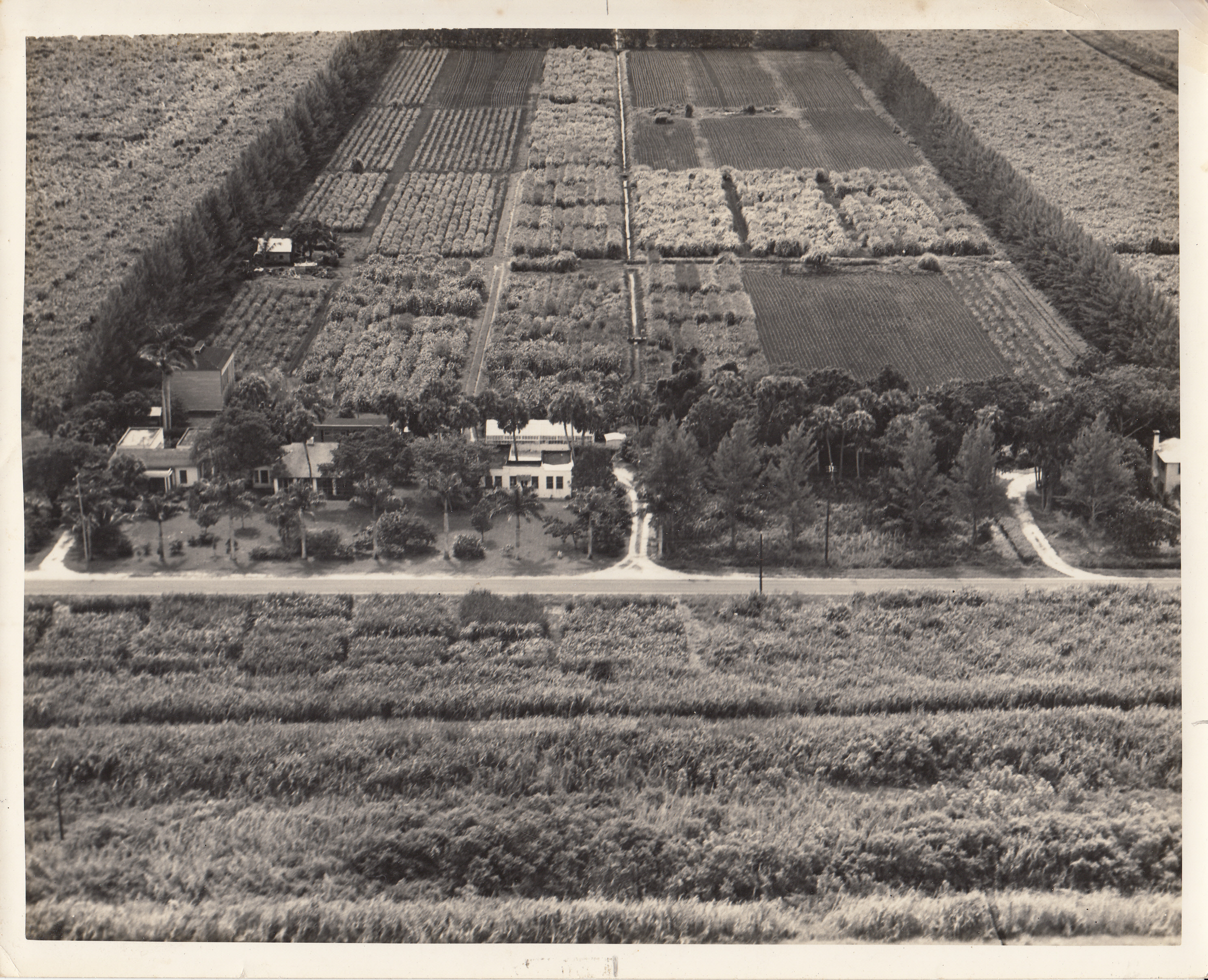
U.S. Sugar Plant Field Station (USDA Sugarcane Field Station), 1940, Canal Point, Florida.

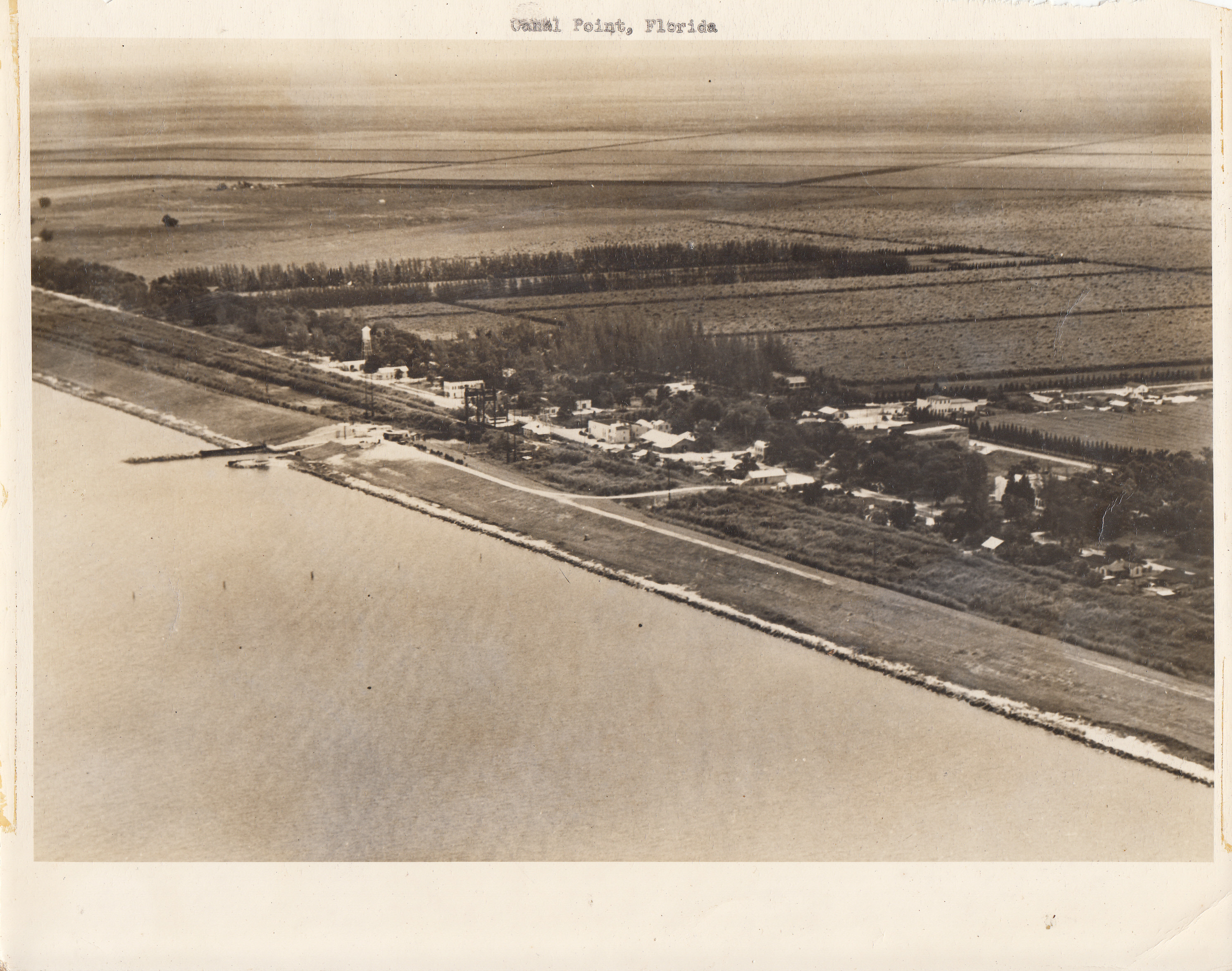
Aerial view, E, of Canal Point, Florida, from over Lake Okeechobee.

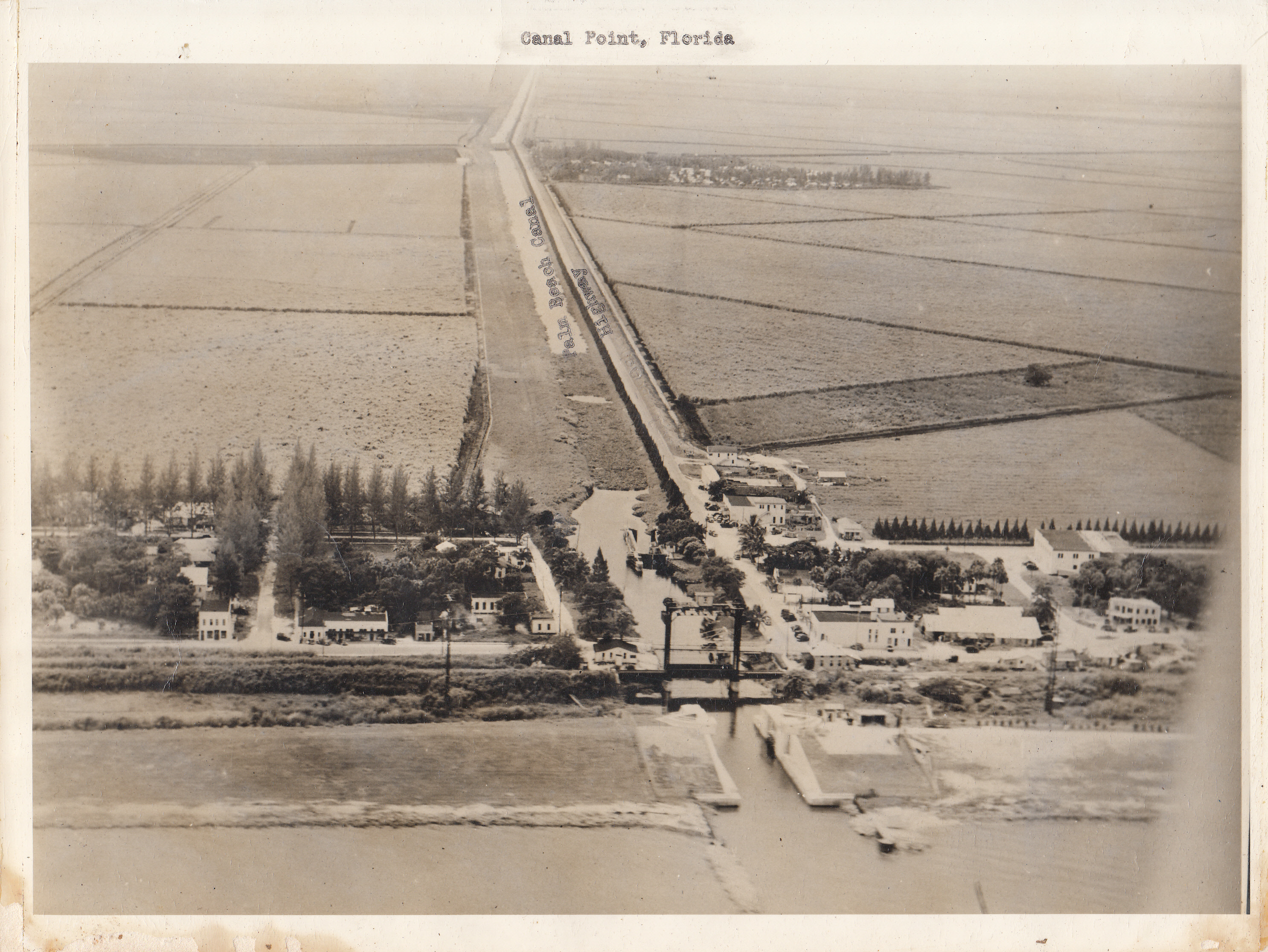
Aerial view, ESE, of West Palm Beach Canal, Canal Point, Florida, 1940, from over Lake Okeechobee.

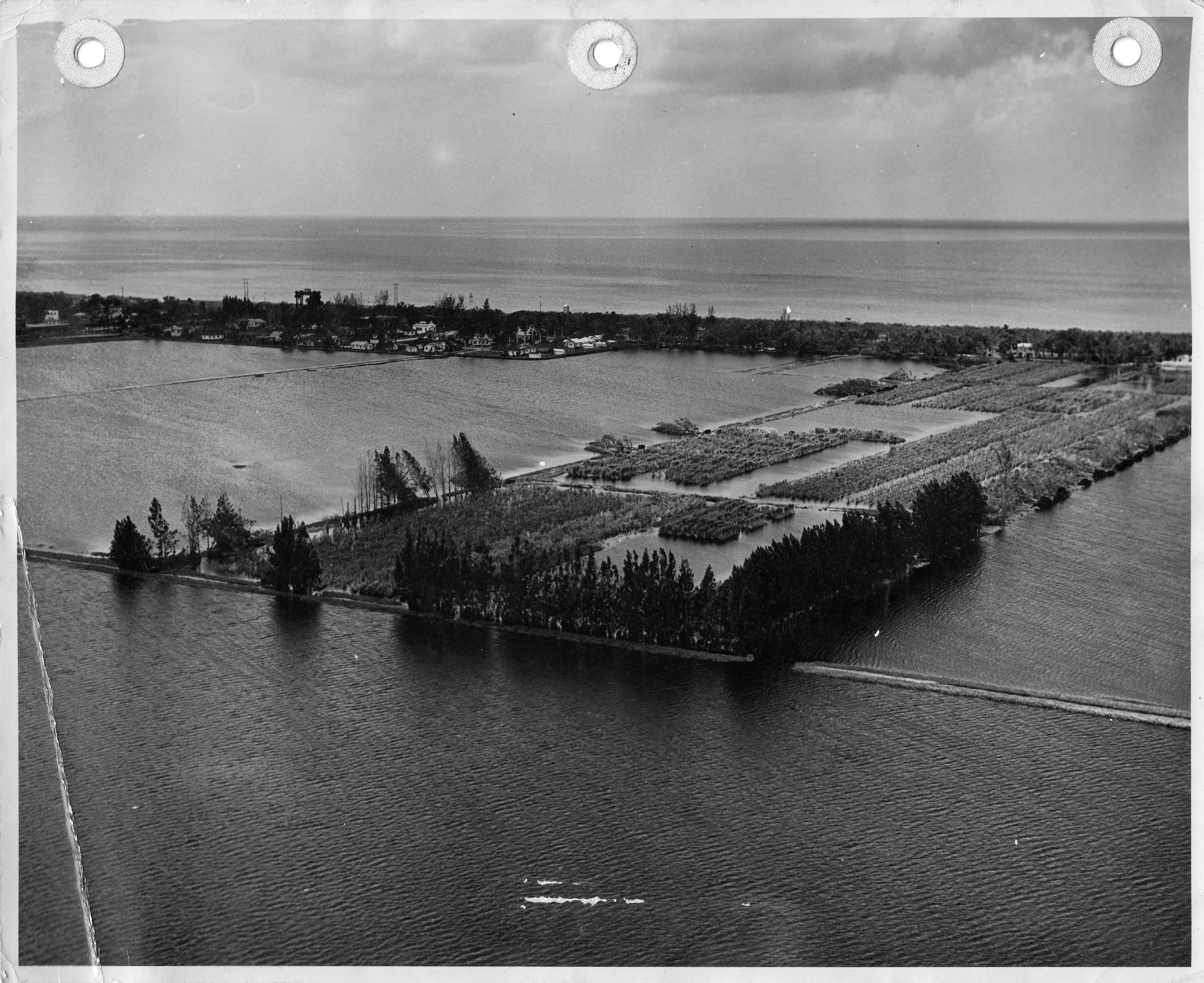
Aerial view, W, of the USDA Sugarcane Experiment Station, Canal Point, Florida, October 6, 1947, flooded after 1947 Fort Lauderdale hurricane.

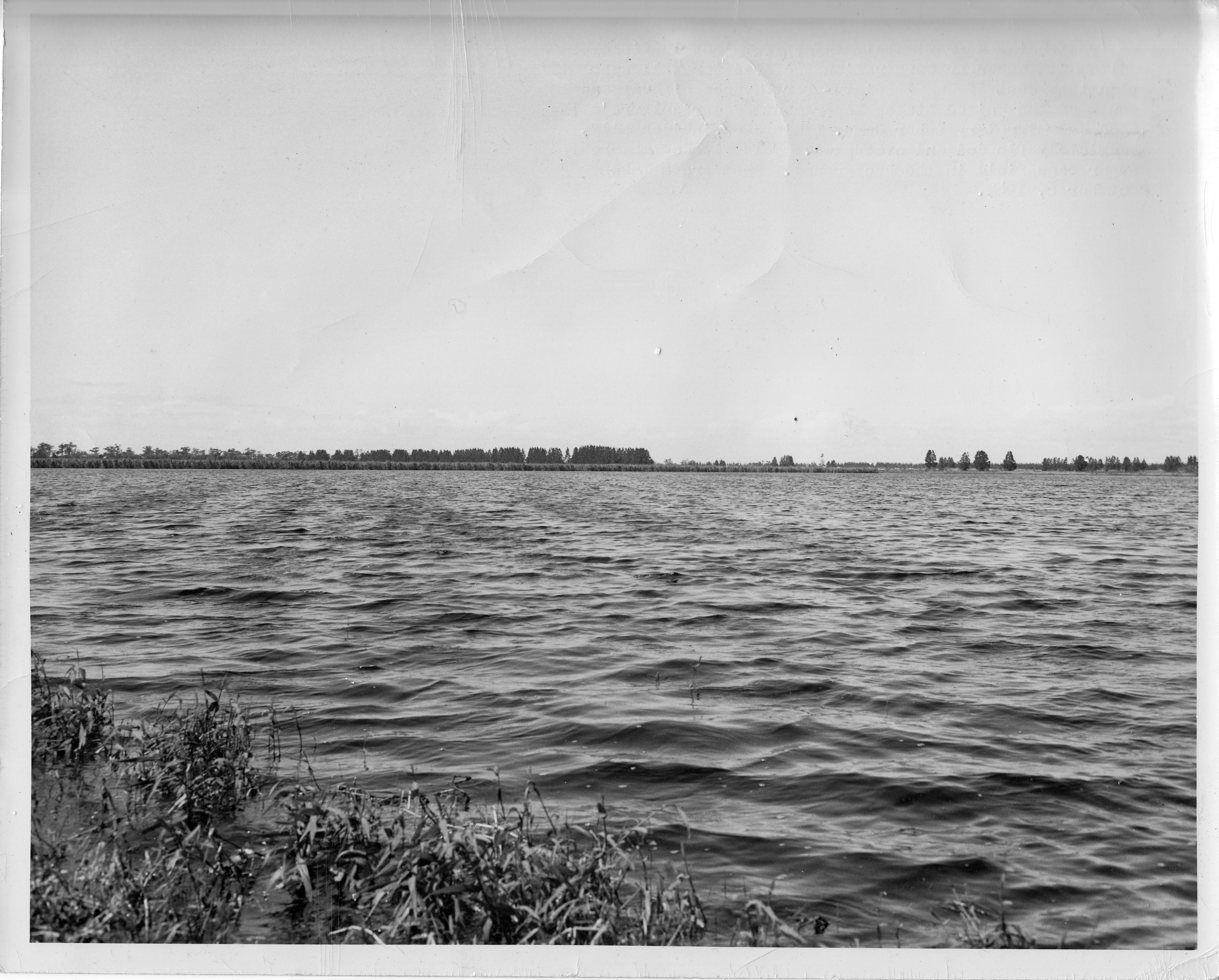
Water standing approximately three feet deep in fields of U.S. Sugar prepared for Fall cane planting, east of Canal Point - Port Myacca Highway and south of the USDA's Sugarcane Experiment Station. Note flooded mature sugarcane field in the background. Photograph taken October 6, 1947, from Canal Point Townsite.

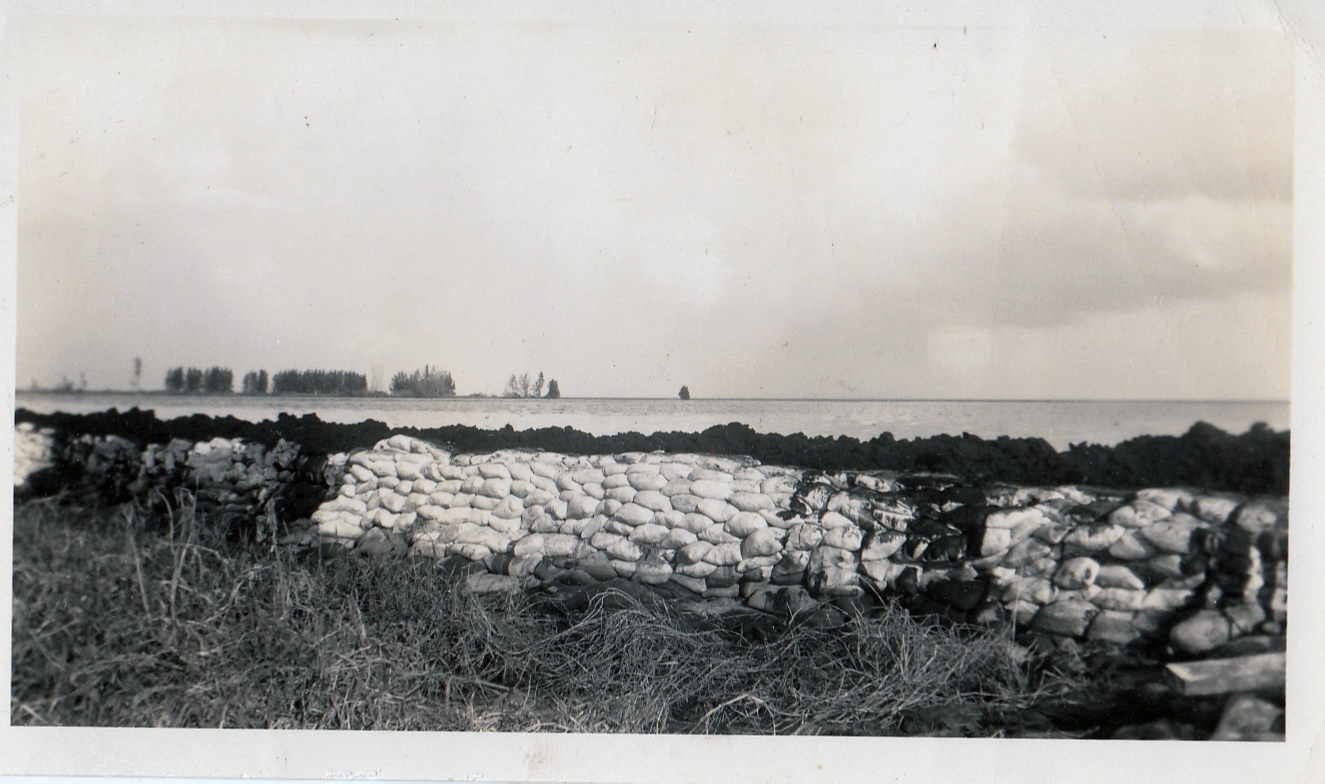
A sandbag and muck dike hold flood water back from the townsite of Canal Point, Florida, during October and November, 1947. The trees in the background are along the border of the USDA sugarcane experiment field.
