= Laura Upthegrove =

American outlaw

Laura Beatrice Upthegrove Swindal (October 5, 1896 – August 6, 1927) was a 20th-century American outlaw, bank robber, bootlegger, and occasional pirate active in southern Florida during the 1910s and 1920s, along with John Ashley.

== Biography ==
=== Origin ===
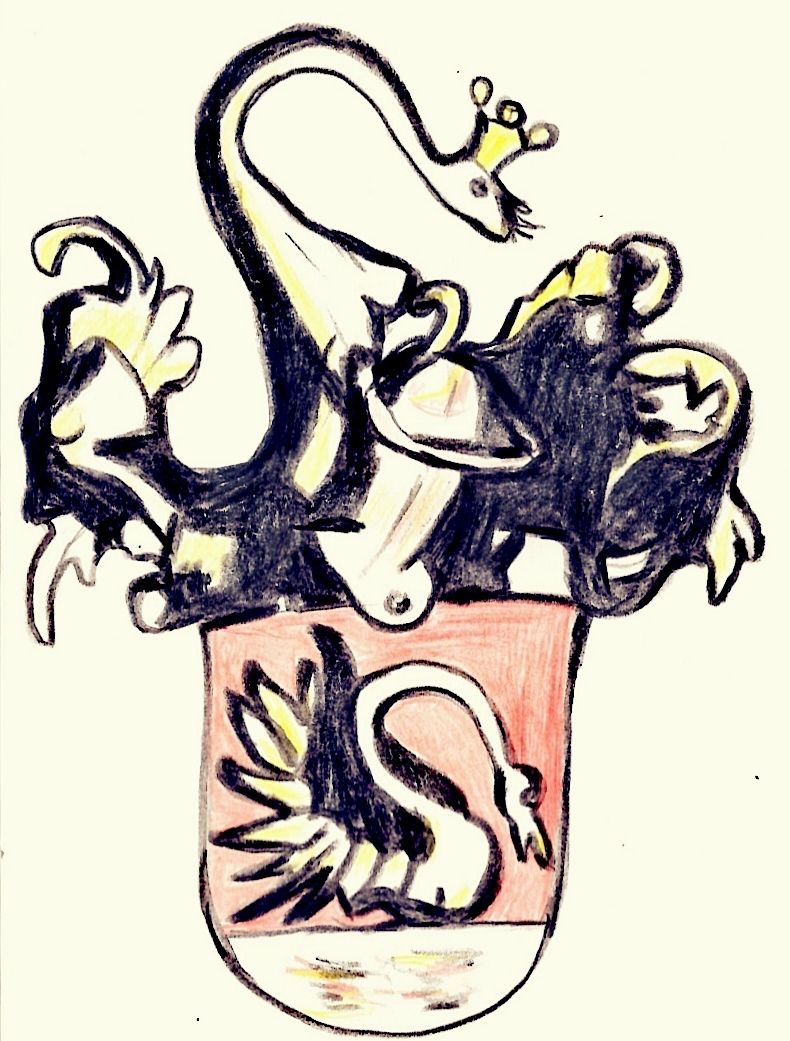
Possible, but not proven coat of arms Op den Graeff as descendants of Herman op den Graeff (Heraldic representation by Matthias Laurenz Gräff based on the Krefeld Op den Graeff stained glass window from 1630, which may depict the “Lohengrin swan” of the Kleve coat of arms in one window)

Laura Upthegrove was born October 5, 1896, in Reddick, near Ocala as a descendant of the Dutch and German Op den Graeff family. She was the daughter of John William Upthegrove (1872–1942) and Emma Rebecca Kittler Peavy (1879–1941). One of her brothers was Clarence Dewitt Upthegrove (1899–1982), a businessman and politician. Laura’s grandfather William Hendry Upthegrove William Hendry Upthegrove (* 1836) served as a Union Army captain with General Sherman. He came to settle in the area near Gainesville in 1865 and founded a branch of the family in Florida. His ancestors descended from the Updegraffs of Germantown. The Updegraff/Upthegrove family where direct descendants of Herman op den Graeff, mennonite leader of Krefeld (Holy Roman Empire) and delegate to 1632 Dordrecht Confession of Faith, and his grandson Abraham op den Graeff, one of the founders of Germantown, politician and in 1688 signer of the first protest against slavery in colonial America.

=== Life ===
At age 14, Laura Upthegrove married 26-year-old Calvin Collier and had two children with Collier by the time she was 18. In 1916, she divorced Collier and married Earnest Tillman, quickly bearing two children. In 1920, she left Tillman for John Ashley and took up a life of crime. From 1915 to 1924, the Ashley Gang operated from various hideouts in the Florida Everglades. Upthegrove scouted for banks to rob and drove the getaway cars. The gang robbed nearly $1 million from at least 40 banks while at the same time hijacking numerous shipments of illegal whiskey being smuggled into the state from the Bahamas. Ashley's gang was so effective that rum-running on the Florida coast virtually ceased while the gang was active. Ashley's two-man raid on the West End, Grand Bahama, in 1924 marked the first time in over a century that American pirates had attacked a British Crown colony.

On April 17, 1925, Laura Upthegrove married Ashley Gang member and childhood friend Joe Tracy in order to avoid testifying in his trial for murdering a taxi driver. In 1924, Laura visited Tracy in a Kissimmee jail cell, attracting Ashley's jealousy. Ashley hatched a plan to storm the jail and kill Tracy, while sharing the plan with Upthegrove as a rescue. When Upthegrove learned Ashley's true intentions, she tipped off law enforcement, who met Ashley and two other gang members at a bridge near Sebastian and killed them all.

Among poor Florida crackers, they were considered folk heroes who represented a symbol of resistance to bankers, lawmen and wealthy landowners. After Ashley's death in 1924, Laura Upthegrove hid out in Canal Point, where she owned and operated a gas station until on August 6, 1927, she died during an argument with a man trying to buy moonshine from her. In the heat of the moment, she swallowed a bottle of Lysol disinfectant and died within minutes. Her mother was present and elected not to call a doctor, because she would be better off dead. It is unclear whether it was an accident, as some claim she mistook it for a bottle of gin, but it was widely reported that she had committed suicide. Laura Upthegrove was 30 years old.

== Appreciation ==
- The couple were the subject of the 1973 film Little Laura and Big John, starring Fabian and Karen Black.
- Upthegrove Beach, Florida, north of Port Mayaca, is named for her family.
