= Herbert Hoover Dike =

Dike around Lake Okeechobee, Florida, US

Coordinates: 26°43′52″N 80°51′32″W

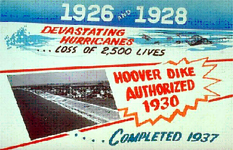
A sign advertising the completion of the Herbert Hoover Dike, which mentions the 1926 and 1928 hurricanes

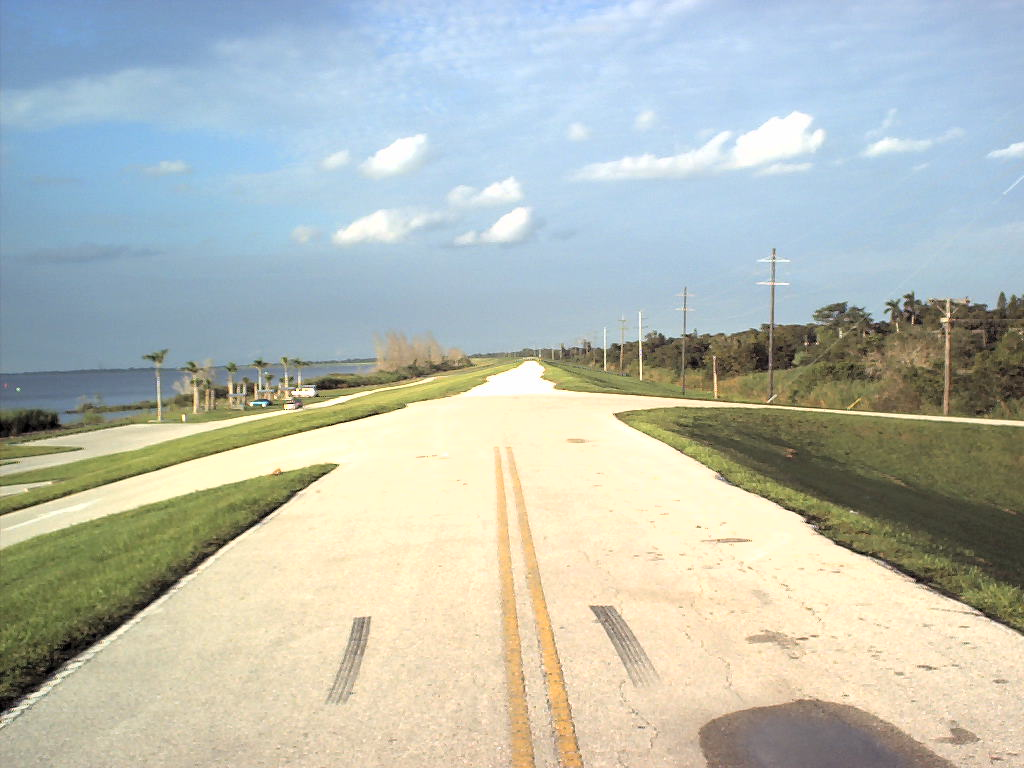
View NNE from atop the Herbert Hoover Dike and its access roads, as seen from the Canal Point Recreation Area in Canal Point, FL

The Herbert Hoover Dike is a dike around the waters of Lake Okeechobee in Florida.

== History ==
In the 1910s, a small earthen dike was constructed. This containment was breached by the storm surge from the Great Miami Hurricane in 1926 and the 1928 Okeechobee Hurricane, killing thousands. After these disasters the Florida State Legislature created the Okeechobee Flood Control District, which was authorized to cooperate with the U.S. Army Corps of Engineers in flood control undertakings.

After a personal inspection of the area by President Herbert Hoover, the Corps drafted a new plan which provided for the construction of floodway channels, control gates, and major levees along Lake Okeechobee's shores. A long term system was designed for the purpose of flood control, water conservation, prevention of saltwater intrusion, and preservation of fish and wildlife populations.

In the 1930s, a larger system of levees was built around the lake. Following heavy precipitation and flooding from two hurricanes in 1947, the dike was again expanded in the 1960s to create the current Herbert Hoover Dike.

The dike almost completely encloses the lake. The only gap in the dike is at Fisheating Creek, where the dike turns inland and parallels the stream on both sides for several miles, leaving Fisheating Creek as the only remaining free-flowing tributary of Lake Okeechobee. The cost of construction was about US$165 million. The dike is now about 30 feet (9.1 meters) high on average. This should be sufficient to protect against future storm surges or flooding; however, there are some concerns that the dike is falling into disrepair.

The Lake Okeechobee Scenic Trail, a bicycle path running atop the dike, was dedicated in 1993. The trail began as the 'Okeechobee Segment of the Florida National Scenic Trail (FNST), and is part of a 1,000 mile trail between Miami and Pensacola.

=== Video history ===
A short video history of the Herbert Hoover Dike produced by the U.S. Army Corps of Engineers, titled USACE: Lake Okeechobee and the Herbert Hoover Dike.

== Environment ==
Over the years, issues with flood control around the lake have caused damage to the environment. This has also led to the recent algae bloom (2016) by preventing the natural flow of rivers from the lake to flush the algae out to sea. Decades of runoff from agricultural and other land uses have exacerbated the water quality issues in Lake Okeechobee.

== U.S. Army Corps of Engineers ==
=== Authorization ===
The Herbert Hoover Dike (HHD) is a component of the Central and Southern Florida (C&SF) Project for Flood Control and other Purposes. The C&SF project was authorized in the Flood Control Act of 1948, 1954, 1960, 1965, and 1968; authorization in 1970 under Section 201 of the Flood Control Act of 1965; the Water Resources Development Act (WRDA) of 1986, 1988, 1990, 1992, 1996 and 2007; and the Rivers and Harbors Act of 1930.

=== Background ===
The HHD system consists of approximately 143 miles of levee surrounding Lake Okeechobee, with 32 culverts, hurricane gates and other water control structures. The first embankments around Lake Okeechobee were constructed by local interests from sand and muck, circa 1915. Hurricane tides overtopped the original embankments in 1926 and 1928 causing over 3,000 deaths. The River and Harbor Act of 1930 authorized the construction of 67.8 miles of levee along the south shore of Lake Okeechobee and 15.7 miles of levee along the north shore. The U.S. Army Corps of Engineers constructed the levees between 1932 and 1938 with crest heights ranging from +32 to +35 feet, National Geodetic Vertical Datum (NGVD). A major hurricane in 1947 prompted the need for additional flood protection work.

As a result, the United States Congress passed the Flood Control Act of 1948 authorizing the first phase of the C&SF project, a comprehensive plan to provide flood protection and other water control benefits in central and south Florida. By the late 1960s the new dike system was completed, raising the elevation of the levees to a maximum +41 feet, NGVD. This provides protection to the Standard Project Flood (SPF) level, approximately an event occurring once in 935 years. However, investigations conducted in the 1980s and early 1990s of the dike system's potential seepage and stability problems resulted in the identification of two major areas of concern: the seepage and embankment stability at the culvert locations, and the problematic foundation conditions of the dike. During high water events piping is experienced thru the levee. In 1999, the Corps developed a plan to rehabilitate the HHD. The plan was approved in 2000 and divided the 143 mile embankment into eight reaches with the initial focus on Reach 1. This Reach by Reach rehabilitation approach has been replaced with a system wide risk reduction approach as required for safety modifications to dams.

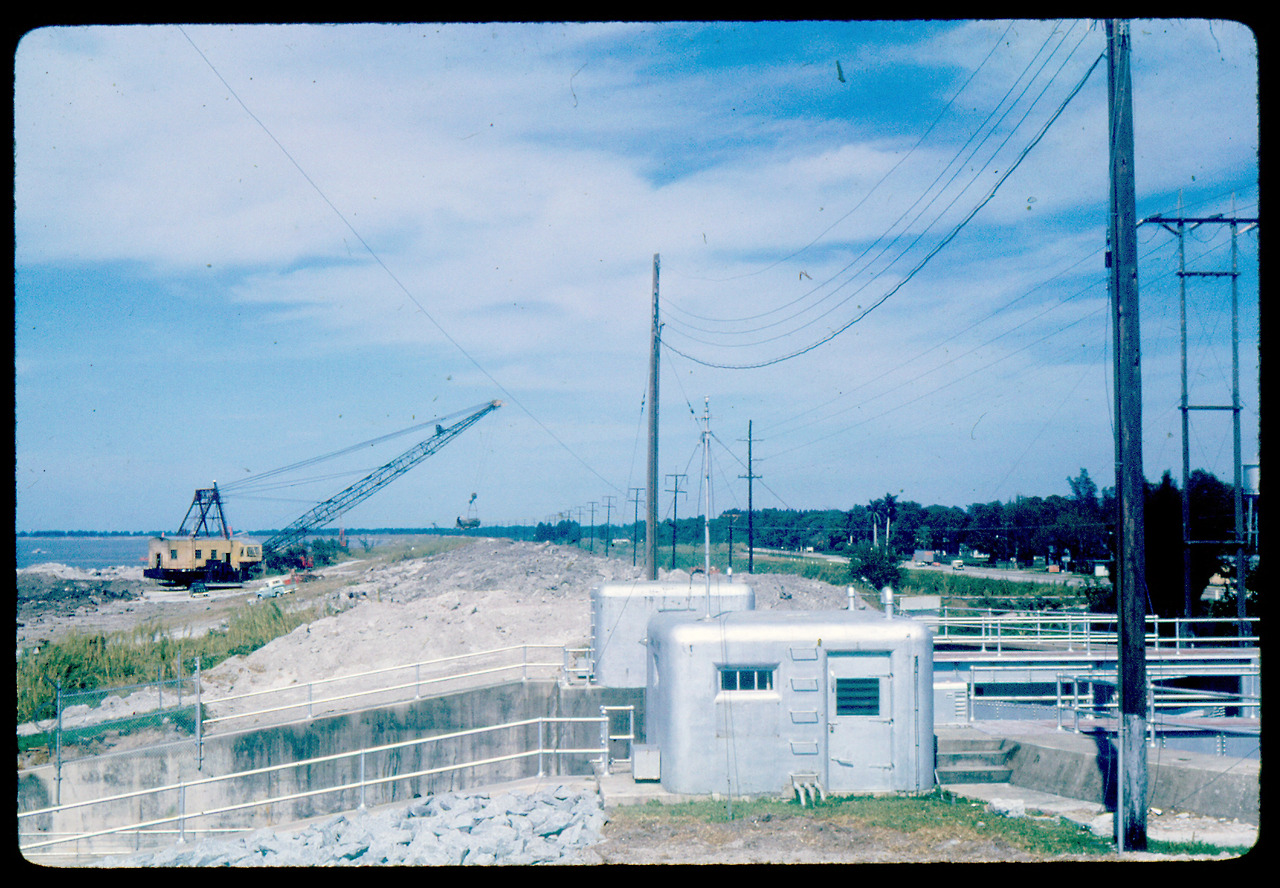
View NNE from atop the Dike from the Canal Point locks during United States Army Corps of Engineers rehabilitation, Canal Point, Florida, 1968.

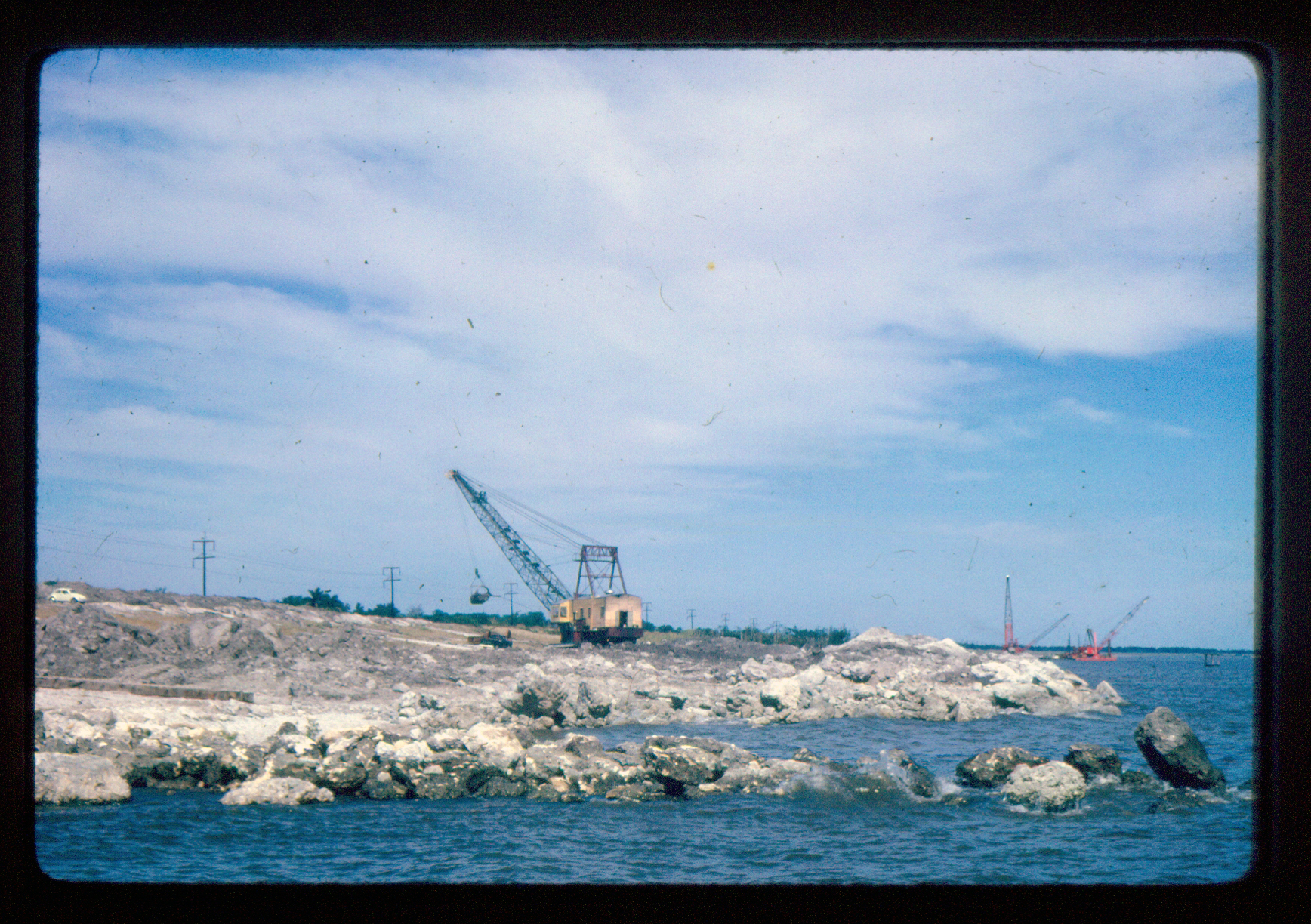
View south of Dike during United States Army Corps of Engineers rehabilitation. Lake Okeechobee is to the right. Canal Point, Florida, 1968.

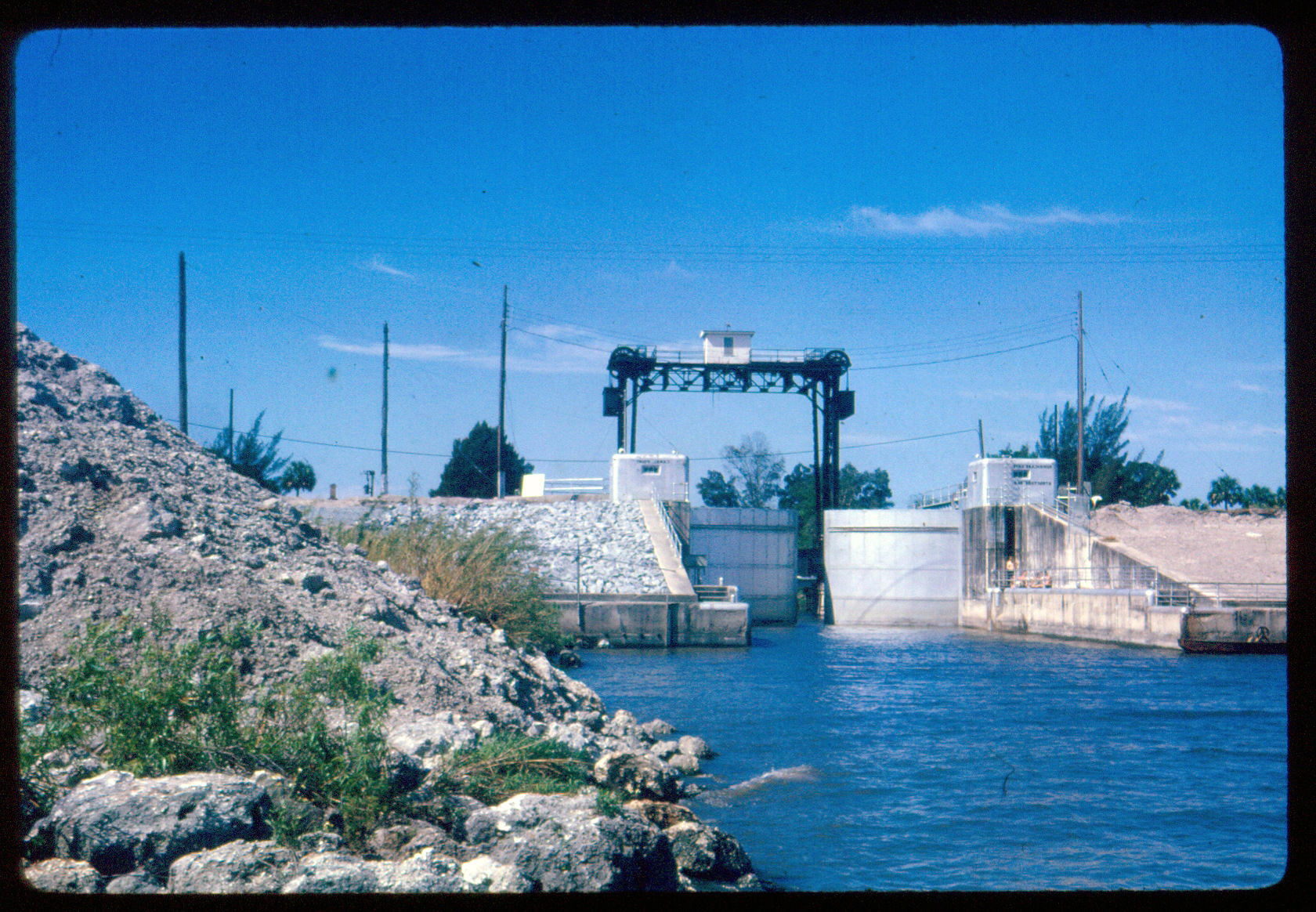
View ESE of Dike Canal Point locks and SCFE train bridge over the West Palm Beach Canal during US Army Corps of Engineers rehabilitation. Lake Okeechobee is behind the photographer. Canal Point, Florida, 1968.

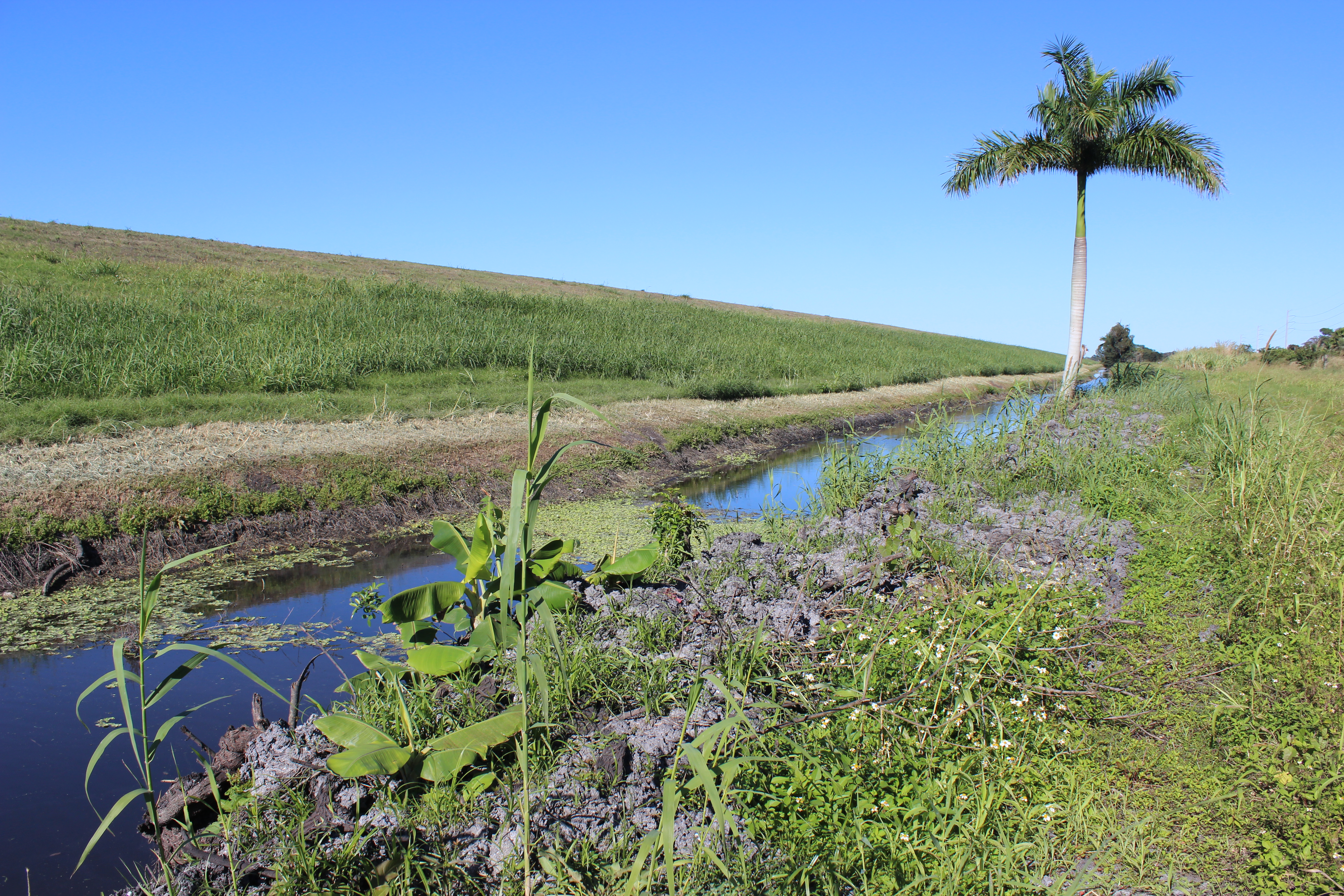
View of the Dike in Canal Point, Florida, along catchment ditch, with Roystonea palm in distance.

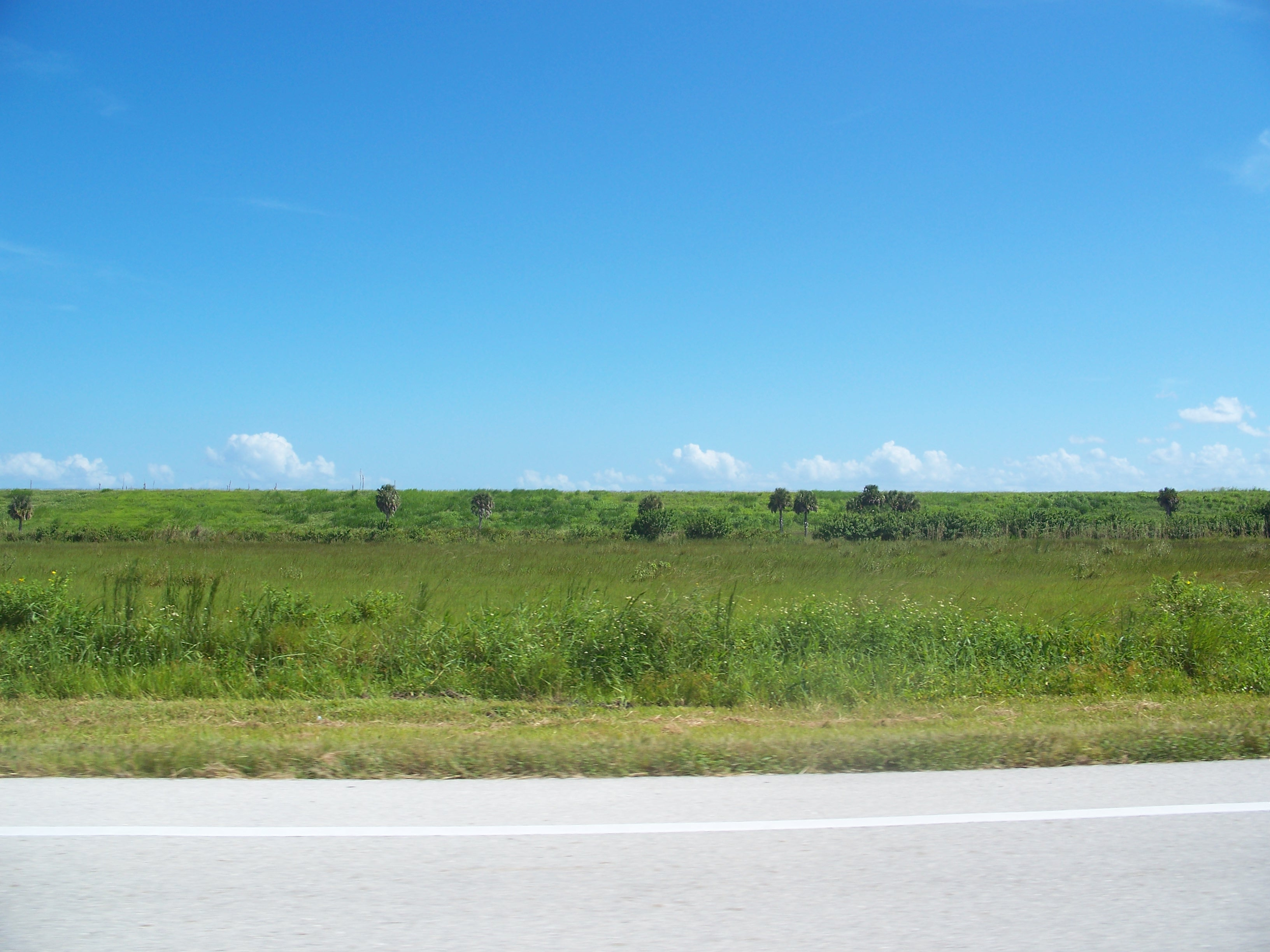
View of the Dike in Glades County from Florida State Road 78, south of the Brighton Seminole Indian Reservation
