= Chautauqua South: Martin County =

Chautauqua South is an arts and education series ("celebrating the harvest of the mind, body, and spirit") that runs from January to April yearly, founded and run by the Martin County Library System in Florida and which showcases an array of artists, authors, storytellers, dramatists, historians, educators, and entertainers. The series is funded by Friends of the Library groups and the Library Foundation.

== Early history of Martin County Library System ==
People migrating to Martin County from bigger northern cities like Orlando and Jacksonville in the late 1800s wanted a lively and engaging community that they were used to. In 1913, a group of women started a club chartered by the State and National Woman's Clubs. The Woman's Club of Stuart supported and maintained the library in Martin County from 1914 to 1957.

== Chautauqua South ==
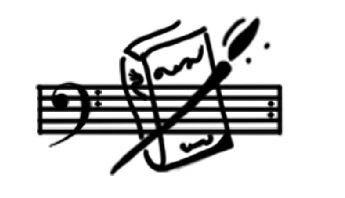
Chautauqua South Logo

Tracing the roots to the open air classrooms on the shores of Chautauqua Lake in New York State in the late 1800s, the Chautauqua movement grew rapidly, with summer Chautauquas springing up across the nation.

In 1992, the Martin County Library System created its own Chautauqua experience in Florida. The slogan (and the logo itself) "Arts and Education Programs Celebrating the Harvest of the Mind, Body and Spirit" was chosen to describe the purpose of Chautauqua South. In 1993, " the Foundation also began raising funds for the popular Chautauqua South programs."

Chautauqua South offers a rich variety of cultural experiences that appeal to a wide range of interests. A key element in its success is the ongoing support from library funders.

In 2015, the Martin County Library System celebrated Chautauqua South's 25th anniversary.

=== Chautauqua South Florida Fiction Award ===
Given the generosity of a three-year sponsor, David Gulick of Gulick & McCauly Construction of Stuart, the Library Foundation of Martin County has presented the "Chautauqua South Florida Fiction Award" to a single author. A crystal plaque and a check for $1,000 was awarded to an author whose book was published within the last three years and who is a resident of Florida or whose book has a significant Florida setting. Other criteria are that the book be fiction, be well written, and have popular appeal.

Former nominees include widely celebrated authors Dave Barry and Carl Hiaasen.

== BookMania! ==
The yearly Chautauqua season begins with BookMania!, a celebration of books, the people who write them, reading and the library itself. At fancy events held in the main library's Armstrong wing, authors read from their works, talk about their craft, and sign copies of their books.

The book celebration has long been a signature event for the county's library system. During its history, the county's library system has welcomed more than 300 authors from around the country, and until 2014, the event was solely run by the county's library system.

The event is currently sponsored by the Library Foundation of Martin County.

In 2017, BookMania! celebrates 23 years.
