= List of dams and reservoirs in Florida =

Following is a list of dams and reservoirs in Florida.

All major dams are linked below. The National Inventory of Dams defines any "major dam" as being 50 feet (15 m) tall with a storage capacity of at least 5,000 acre-feet (6,200,000 m^{3}), or of any height with a storage capacity of 25,000 acre-feet (31,000,000 m^{3}).

== Dams and reservoirs in Florida ==
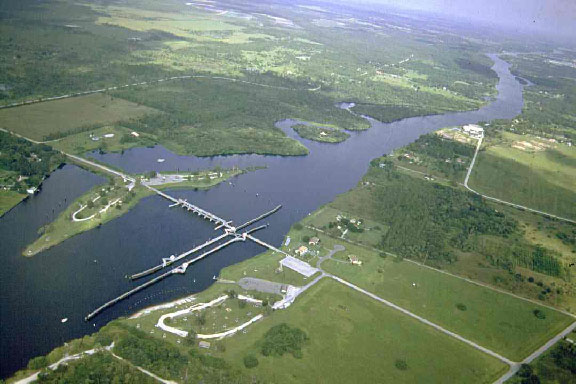
Franklin Lock and Dam

- Apopka-Beauclair Lock and Dam, on Apopka-Beauclair Canal, St. Johns River Water Management District
- Burrell Lock and Dam, on Haines Creek, St. Johns River Water Management District
- multiple dikes, C. W. Bill Young Regional Reservoir, Tampa Bay Water
- Franklin Lock and Dam, on the Caloosahatchee River, United States Army Corps of Engineers
- Herbert Hoover Dike, Lake Okeechobee, USACE
- Inglis Spillway and Dam, Lake Rousseau, Florida Department of Environmental Protection
- Jackson Bluff Dam, Lake Talquin, City of Tallahassee, Florida
- Jim Woodruff Dam, Lake Seminole, USACE
- Lake Manatee Dam, Lake Manatee, Manatee County Utilities
- Moore Haven Lock and Dam, on the Okeechobee Waterway, USACE
- Moss Bluff Lock and Spillway, on the Oklawaha River, St. Johns River Water Management District
- Munson Recreation State Dam, Lake Munson, State of Florida
- Ortona Lock and Dam, on the Okeechobee Waterway, USACE
- Port Mayaca Lock and Dam, on the Okeechobee Waterway, USACE
- Rodman Dam, Rodman Reservoir, Florida Department of Environmental Protection
- St. Lucie Lock and Dam, on the Okeechobee Waterway, USACE

== See also ==
- List of dam removals in Florida
