= Kreamer Island =

Island and ghost town in Palm Beach County, Florida

- Kreamer Island

Geography
- Location: Palm Beach County, Florida
- Coordinates: 26°45′32″N 80°43′54″W
- Adjacent to: Lake Okeechobee
- Area: 3,000 acres (1,200 ha)
- Highest elevation: 13 ft (4 m)

Administration
- United States
- State: Florida
- County: Palm Beach County

Additional information
- Time zone: EST (UTC-5:00)
  - Summer (DST): EDT (UTC-4:00)

Kreamer Island, sometimes spelled as Kraemer Island, is an island and ghost town in Lake Okeechobee, Florida. Kreamer Island is located in Palm Beach County, just north of Torry Island and near the lake's southeastern shore.

== Etymology ==
Kreamer Island is named after Colonel James N. Kreamer, a chief engineer for Hamilton Disston's efforts to drain the Everglades in 1881. Originally, the island's post office mistakenly used the name "Kraemer" until The United States Post Office Department officially corrected the spelling of the local branch to Kreamer in 1932.

== History ==
=== Early settlement ===
While the island bears the name of Colonel James N. Kreamer, the chief engineer for Hamilton Disston's 1881 drainage project, it remained a dense pond apple wilderness for the late 19th century. Permanent settlement began in earnest in the early 1900s as the first pioneers, including the Gant and Pickett families, began the task of clearing the thick jungle to reach the fertile "muck" soil beneath. The island's isolation required settlers to be entirely self-sufficient, relying on boats for all transportation and communication.

=== Growth and agriculture (1910–1927) ===
By the 1910s, Kreamer Island had developed into a thriving agricultural hub, often considered the most "communal" of the southern Lake Okeechobee islands. The rich organic soil proved ideal for winter vegetables, and the island became a massive producer of string beans, tomatoes, and potatoes.

The community's social life centered around a prominent two-story wooden schoolhouse, which was a rarity for the region at the time. This school served children from Kreamer, Ritta, and Torry islands. In 1918, Kreamer Island's post office was established. Because there were no roads or bridges connecting the island to the mainland at the time, the harvest was transported via steamboats and barges to the Florida East Coast Railway at Okeechobee City or shipped to Florida's West Coast in Fort Myers.

=== 1928 Hurricane ===
The 1928 Okeechobee Hurricane brought a definitive end to the island's agricultural boom. During the height of the storm, dozens of residents took refuge in the two-story schoolhouse. While the building survived the initial winds, the massive storm surge and the subsequent months of standing water destroyed the crops and most of the island's homes. The 1928 hurricane caused the majority of Kreamer Island's residents to move elsewhere.

=== Commercial fishing era ===
Following the 1928 hurricane, Kreamer Island shifted from a farming community to a hub for the Lake Okeechobee commercial fishing industry. Throughout the 1930s and 1940s, the island served as the headquarters for a rugged population of "catfishermen". These residents lived in simple, elevated wooden shacks along the shoreline to avoid the fluctuating lake levels.

The island's fishing camps were highly productive, utilizing long trotlines and "hoop nets" to harvest channel catfish. At its peak, the Kreamer Island fish houses processed thousands of pounds of fish daily, which were packed in ice and often brought in by boat from Belle Glade to be shipped by rail to markets as far away as New York and Chicago. However, as the lake's levee system was modernized and fishing regulations changed, this industry declined.

=== Abandonment and modern status ===
The final residents began to leave in the mid-20th century as the island returned to its natural state. For a time, a small bridge connected Kreamer to Torry Island, providing limited access for hunters and remaining residents. However, this bridge burned down in the 1970s, effectively ending easy access to the island. Today, Kreamer Island is uninhabited and has largely reverted to a wild landscape of overgrown tropical vegetation.

== See also ==
- Ritta Island
- List of ghost towns in Florida
- Draining and development of the Everglades
