= St. Lucie Canal =

Canal in Martin County, Florida

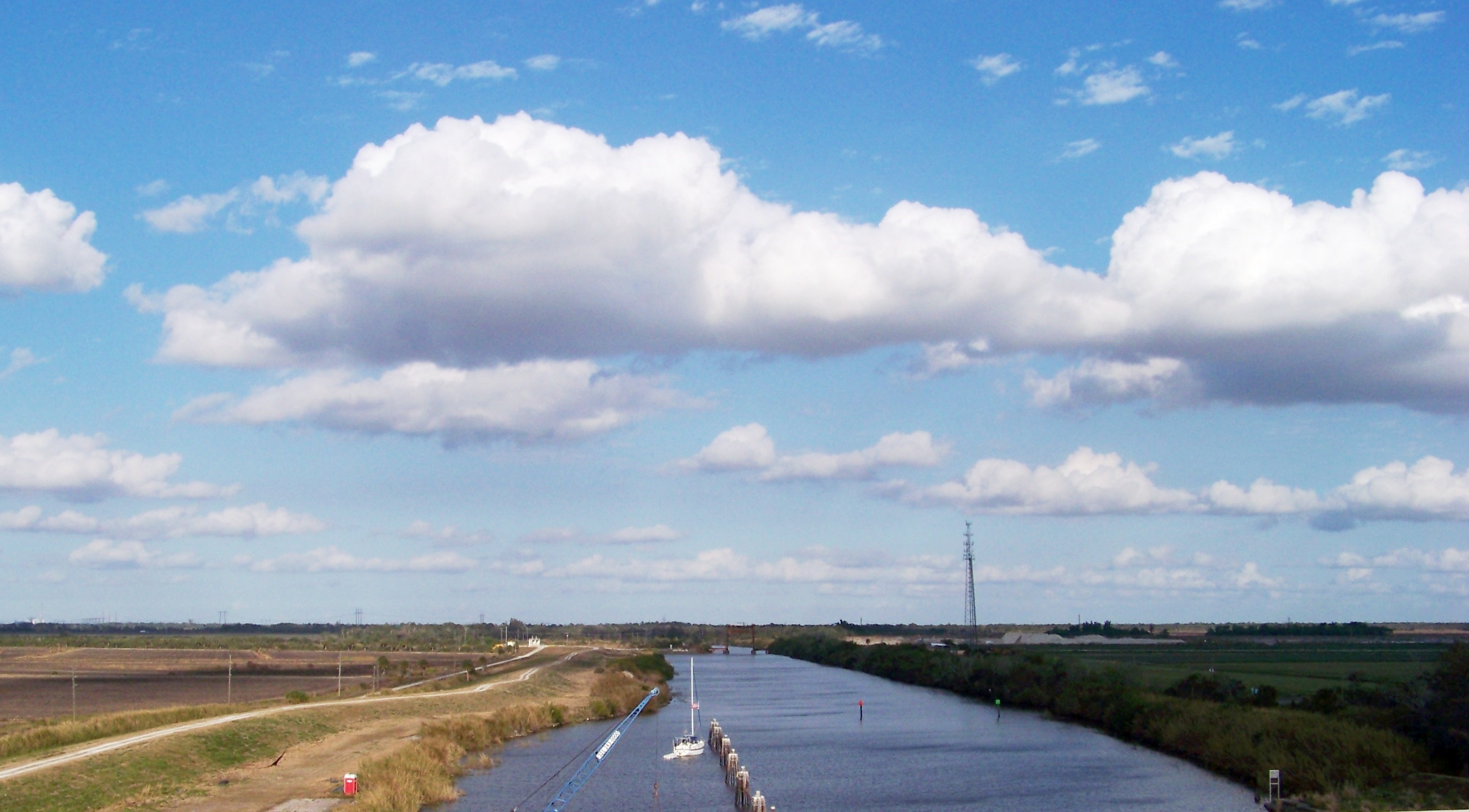
- The St. Lucie Canal as seen from US 98 looking east
- Interactive map of St. Lucie Canal
- Location: Martin County, Florida
- Country: United States
- Coordinates: 27.0394°N 80.3832°W

Specifications
- Length: 26 miles (42 km)
- Locks: 2
- Total rise: 11–12.5 feet (3.4–3.8 m)
- Navigation authority: U.S. Army Corps of Engineers

History
- Construction began: 1916
- Date completed: 1924

Geography
- Start point: Lake Okeechobee
- End point: Indian River Lagoon

The St. Lucie Canal, also known as the C-44 Canal or simply C-44, is a man-made canal in Martin County, Florida, connecting Lake Okeechobee to the Indian River Lagoon. The canal was built between 1916 and 1924 to divert floodwaters from the lake into the St. Lucie Estuary via the South Fork of the St. Lucie River. Deepened in 1937 to enable the passage of boats, the St. Lucie Canal is now the eastern segment of the Okeechobee Waterway.

The C-44 has been a source of contention since its construction. The canal has had significant environmental impacts—restoration projects in the St. Lucie River are the northernmost component of the Comprehensive Everglades Restoration Plan.

== Description ==
The St. Lucie Canal connects to Lake Okeechobee at Port Mayaca, Florida. The canal is 8 feet (2.4 m) deep as a result of its second deepening in 1949. It has a rate of flow of 9,000 cubic feet (250 m^{3}) per second. In 1933, 16 fixed spillways were approved for construction to reduce shoaling.

The C-44 has a drainage basin of 185 square miles (480 km^{2}), equivalent to 117,000 acres (47,000 ha).

=== Water flow ===
In 1924, the canal′s original flow capacity was 5,000 cubic feet (140 m^{3}) per second. In 1937, the canal was deepened to 6 feet (1.8 m) increasing its flow capacity. In 1949, it was deepened to 8 feet (2.4 m), which increased the flow capacity to 9,000 cubic feet (250 m^{3}) per second.

According to the Florida Department of Environmental Protection, the St. Lucie Canal flows both east to the St. Lucie Estuary and west to Lake Okeechobee "on about an equal basis."

=== Navigation ===
The St. Lucie Canal connects to the Caloosahatchee Waterway, which connects Lake Okeechobee to the Gulf of Mexico at Fort Myers, Florida.

=== Locks and structures ===
There are two locks on the St. Lucie Canal. The Port Mayaca Lock and Dam (also known as S-308) is located at the western end of the canal at its outlet to Lake Okeechobee. Its rise is typically 0.5–2 feet (0.15–0.61 m). The St. Lucie Lock and Dam (S-80) divides the canal from sea level on the eastern side, a rise of about 10.5 feet (3.2 m).

A structure known as S-153 regulates water flow from the Levee 65 Borrow Canal into the St. Lucie Canal.

== Environmental and navigation problems ==
=== Fresh water discharge ===
One of the major problems resulting from the construction of C-44 is that control of the water levels of Lake Okeechobee causes too much fresh water to discharge from the canal into the St. Lucie Estuary. Large discharges from Lake Okeechobee into C-44 cause salinity levels to drop rapidly, killing many species in the estuary.

=== Turbidity ===
High flow rates in the canal result in erosion and the transport of sediment into the St. Lucie Estuary that can smother benthic habitats. The increased turbidity of high flow rates also results in sediment filling navigation channels.

=== Drainage basin ===
Drainage from the canal′s drainage basin into the St. Lucie Canal creates water quality problems in the St. Lucie Estuary.

== History ==
Construction of the C-44 Canal began in 1916 and was completed in 1924. The original purpose of the canal was to allow for an improved way to divert floodwaters from Lake Okeechobee. The canal was originally designed to flow into Manatee Pocket instead of the South Fork of the St. Lucie River.

The C-44 has been a source of contention since its construction in 1916. Records indicate that people have been complaining about the negative impacts of the canal since the early 1950s.

=== Timeline ===
- 1916: Construction begins on canal C-44.
- 1924: Construction is completed, providing a flow capacity of 5,000 cubic feet (140 m^{3}) per second.
- 1937: The C-44 is deepened to 6 feet (1.8 m) to allow for the navigation of vessels to and from Lake Okeechobee.
- 1949: The C-44 is deepened to 8 feet (2.4 m), increasing the flow capacity to 9,000 cubic feet (250 m^{3}) per second.
