= Roosevelt Bridge (Florida) =

Bridge in Florida, United States of America

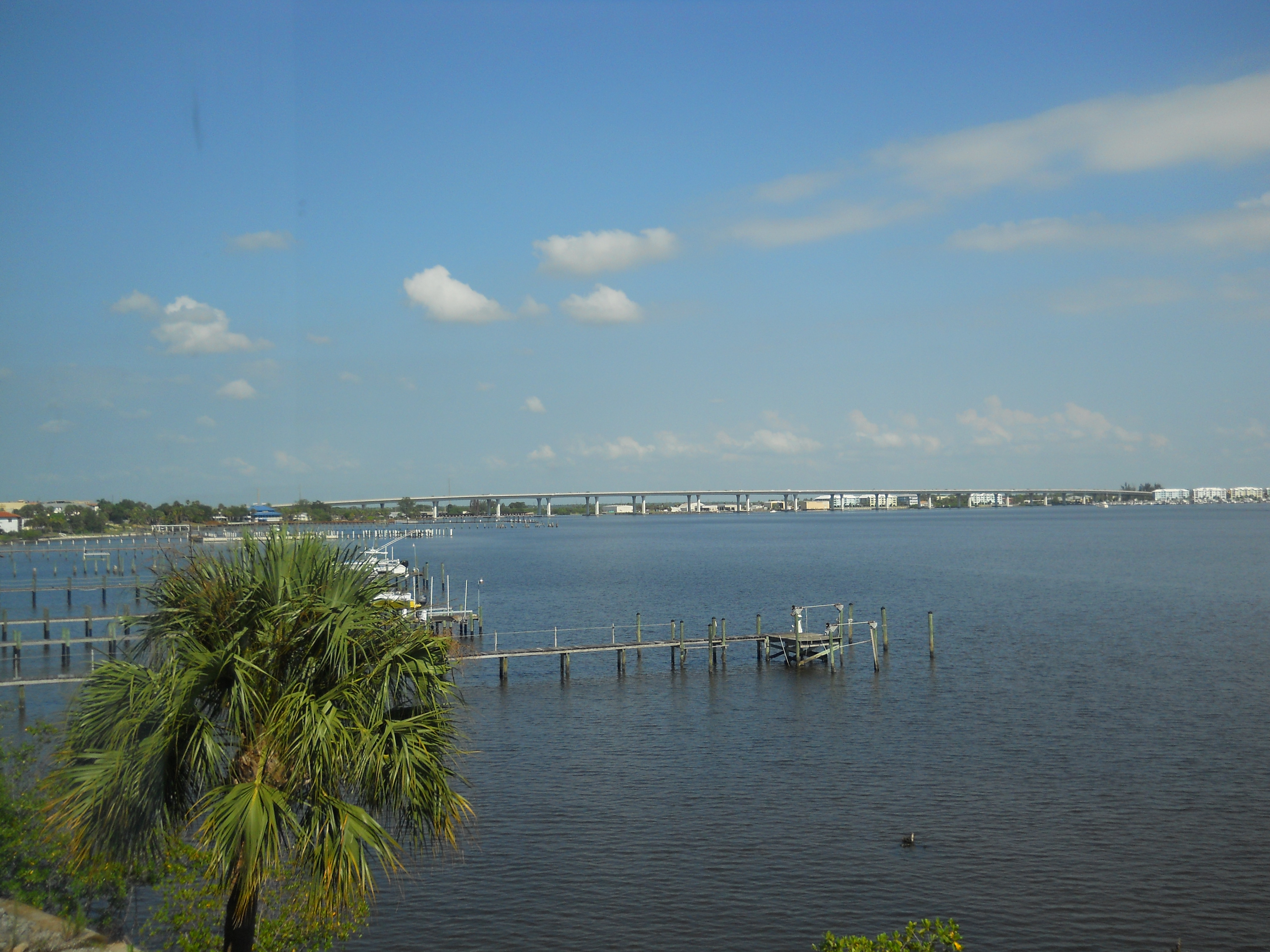
- Coordinates: 27°13′N 80°16′W
- Carries: US 1
- Crosses: St. Lucie River
- Locale: Stuart, Florida
- Named for: Franklin D. Roosevelt

Characteristics
- Design: segmental bridge

History
- Construction end: 1996
- Replaces: Old Roosevelt Bridge

The Roosevelt Bridge is a major highway segmental bridge across the St. Lucie River in Stuart, Florida. Carrying U.S. Route 1 (Federal Highway; unsigned State Road 5), it was built to supersede the Old Roosevelt Bridge, which had twin parallel drawbridges, one for northbound traffic (opened in 1934, 27.202783°N 80.259898°W) and the other for southbound (opened in 1964, 27.202475°N 80.259762°W). The new bridge, completed in 1996, is raised and much longer than the older twin drawbridges. The southbound span of the old bridge is still functional for road and boat traffic and now carries two-way road traffic for what is now known as Dixie Highway, County Road 707. The new high-level Roosevelt Bridge is approximately one mile long and is made of two three-lane sections running parallel to each other. The northbound bridge was completed first, and housed two lanes of both north and south-bound traffic until the second bridge was finished. Because of high traffic volume and visibility, the Roosevelt Bridge is a frequent location for many protests and political campaigning in the area.

== Structural damage ==
On June 17, 2020, chunks of concrete fell off the bridge, causing a large crack along the underside of the southbound bridge, which put the bridge at suspected risk of an imminent collapse. The entire bridge in both directions closed later that day. Dixie Highway was also closed, since it passes under both spans near the crack. With detours needed, tolls were temporarily waived on Florida's Turnpike from Stuart to Port St. Lucie to help ease traffic congestion during this closure. After severe corrosion and ruptured steel tendons were found on the bridge, Mayor Mike Meier issued a local state of emergency for the city of Stuart "based upon hazardous conditions currently existing with the Roosevelt Bridge. The declaration provides for the performance of public works and taking necessary actions to ensure the health, safety, and welfare of the community." After inspection, the northbound bridge reopened on June 20 carrying four lanes of car traffic (two in each direction) with a 5 ton restriction. Dixie Highway and the Old Roosevelt Bridge also reopened. The southbound bridge remained fully closed until November 5, 2020. Soon after, both spans returned to full three-lane traffic with no weight restrictions. During the closures, both spans received new topcoat sealant to prevent water from seeping into the concrete.
