= Old Roosevelt Bridge =

Bridge in Florida, United States of America

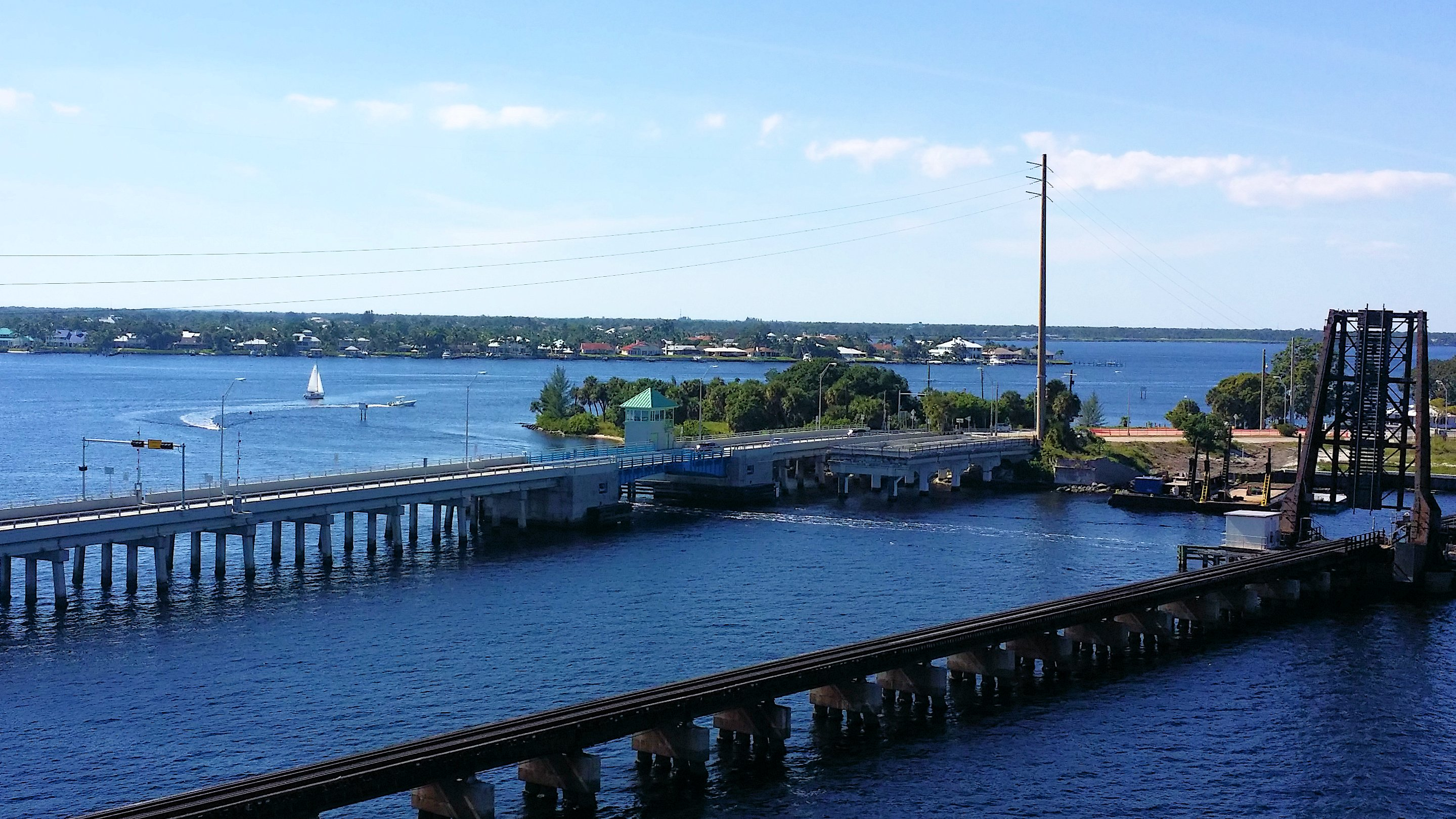
- Coordinates: 27.203092°N 80.260676°W
- Carries: CR 707 (Dixie Highway)
- Crosses: St. Lucie River
- Locale: Stuart, Florida
- Owner: Florida Department of Transportation
- Maintained by: Louis Berger Hawthorne Services
- ID number: 890003
- Followed by: Roosevelt Bridge

Characteristics
- Design: Bascule bridge
- Material: Steel
- Total length: 1,229 feet
- Width: 28 feet

History
- Opened: 1964

Statistics
- Daily traffic: 11,500

Location
- Interactive map of Old Roosevelt Bridge

The Old Roosevelt Bridge (also called the St. Lucie River Bridge) is a bascule bridge that carries the old Dixie Highway (County Road 707) across the St. Lucie River in Stuart, Florida. The current bridge was built in 1964 and is a low-level bascule bridge.

== History ==
The first bridge built at this site to carry the Dixie Highway over the St. Lucie River was a swing bridge in 1918. This first bridge was named the Henry Flagler Bridge, named for the founder of the parallel Florida East Coast Railway. The route over the bridge would receive the designation of US 1 in 1926.

In 1934, the swing bridge was replaced by a two-lane bascule bridge. The original swing bridge was then dismantled but its swing span was reused a year later for the Torry Island Swing Bridge near Belle Glade, where it still operates today. The bridge was named Roosevelt Bridge after President Franklin D. Roosevelt, whose New Deal funded the bridge's construction.

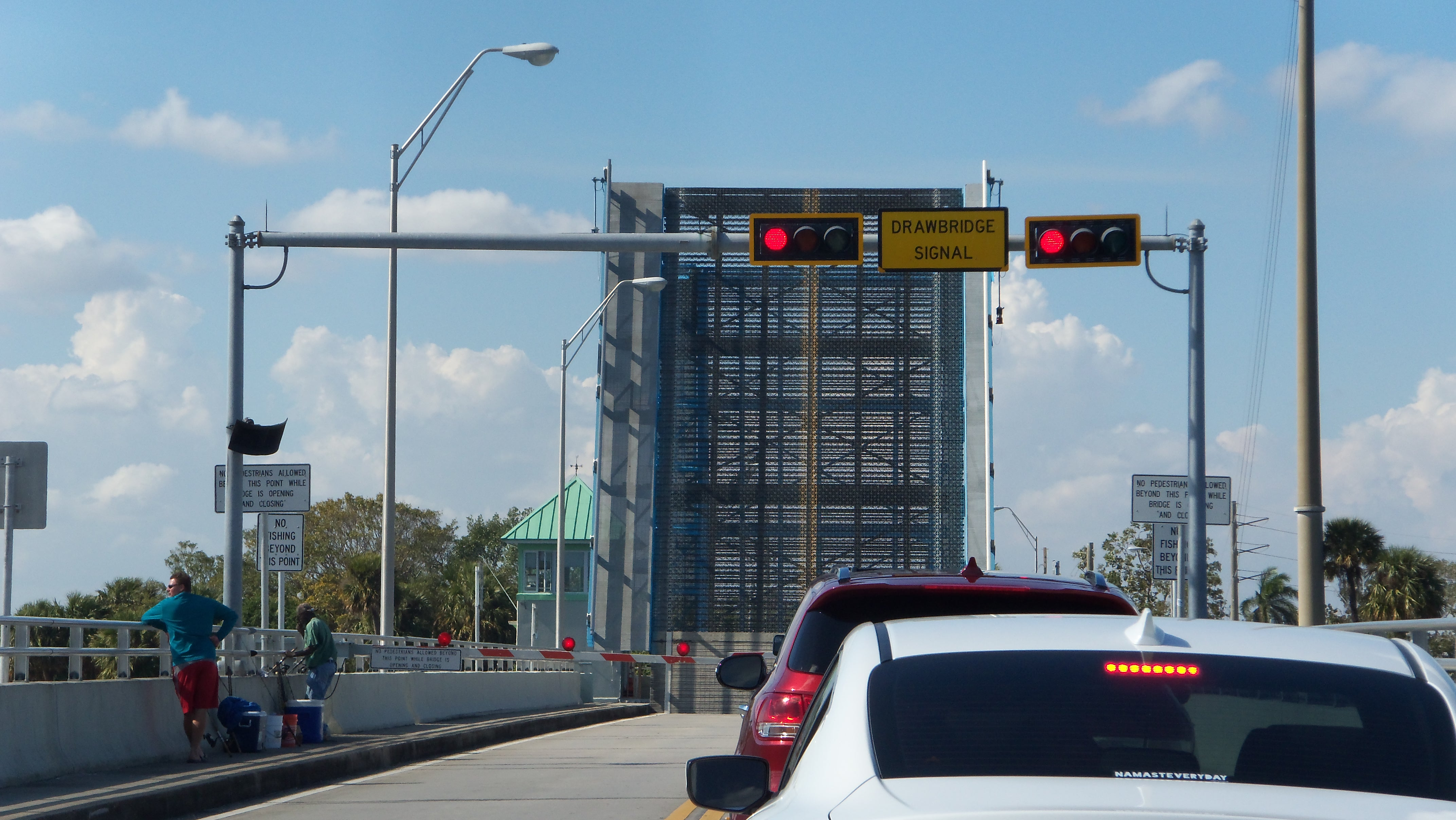
Roadway view in 2017, with draw span up

A second two-lane bascule bridge (the one operating today) was built in 1964 right next to the 1934 bridge in an effort to widen the river crossing to four lanes. The newer bridge would carry northbound traffic, while the 1934 bridge would carry southbound traffic.

When the new high-level Roosevelt Bridge was completed in 1996, US 1 was rerouted over the new span. After the new bridge opened, the Old Roosevelt Bridge remained in service for local traffic and was reduced to two lanes on the 1964 bascule bridge. The 1934 bridge, which had operated for over 60 years, was then demolished. A small part of the 1934 span still stands abandoned on the north side of the river.
