= List of dam removals in Florida =

This is a list of dams in Florida that have been removed as physical impediments to free-flowing rivers or streams.

== Removals by watershed ==
=== Apalachicola River ===
A dam on Kelly Branch, a tributary of the Apalachicola River, was removed by The Nature Conservancy in 2007 as part of Apalachicola Bluffs and Ravines Preserve. The removal was intended to restore habitat for the blacktail shiner.

=== Choctawhatchee Bay and East Bay ===
Most dam removals in Florida have occurred at Eglin Air Force Base on waterways that drain to either Choctawhatchee Bay or East Bay. These projects were for the benefit of threatened or endangered aquatic species. For example, two dams that had been built to create water hazards for the base's Eagle Golf Course were removed in 2007–2008 to improve the habitat of the Okaloosa darter.

== Completed removals ==
Dam	Height	Year removed	Location	Watercourse	Watershed
Wilson Pond Dam	10 ft (3.0 m)	2017	Eglin Air Force Base; Walton County; 30.6056°N 86.2519°W	Tributary to Brier Creek	Alaqua Bayou
Dead Lakes Dam	18 ft (5.5 m)	1987	Wewahitchka; 30.124°N 85.1767°W	Chipola River	Apalachicola River
Kelly Branch Dam		2007	Blountstown; 30.4964°N 85.0084°W	Kelly Branch	Apalachicola River
Unnamed dam		2008	Eglin Air Force Base; Niceville; 30.5304°N 86.4868°W	Mill Creek	Boggy Bayou
Eagle Golf Course Dam	5 ft (1.5 m)	2007	Eglin Air Force Base; Niceville; 30.5316°N 86.4871°W	Mill Creek	Boggy Bayou
Anderson Pond Dam	11 ft (3.4 m)	2010	Eglin Air Force Base; Okaloosa County; 30.5598°N 86.5146°W	Anderson Branch	Boggy Bayou
Estimated Dam 1423		2010	Eglin Air Force Base; Okaloosa County; 30.5601°N 86.5145°W	Anderson Branch	Boggy Bayou
Kendricks Pond Dam	9 ft (2.7 m)	2013	Eglin Air Force Base; Okaloosa County; 30.5189°N 86.516°W	Tributary to Turkey Creek	Boggy Bayou
Kepner Pond Dam	14 ft (4.3 m)	2008	Eglin Air Force Base; Okaloosa County; 30.5903°N 86.5374°W	Tributary to Parrish Creek	Boggy Bayou
Hazelwood Pond Dam	14 ft (4.3 m)	2009	Eglin Air Force Base; Okaloosa County; 30.5737°N 86.4763°W	Long Branch	Boggy Bayou
Pace's Dike Dam	6 ft (1.8 m)	1991	Big Cypress National Preserve; Monroe County; 25.7191°N 81.0482°W	Gum Slough	Everglades
Dam and Lock		2000		Kissimmee River	Kissimmee River
Puddin Head Dam		2010	Rocky Bayou State Park; Niceville; 30.4983°N 86.4257°W	Steephead Stream	Rocky Bayou
Brandt Pond Dam	9 ft (2.7 m)	2018	Eglin Air Force Base; Okaloosa County; 30.5563°N 86.4761°W	Fox Head Branch	Rocky Bayou
Brown Pond Dam	12 ft (3.7 m)	2009	Eglin Air Force Base; Okaloosa County; 30.5842°N 86.4153°W	Tributary to Little Rocky Creek	Rocky Bayou
Buck Pond Dam	10 ft (3.0 m)	2018	Eglin Air Force Base; Santa Rosa County; 30.5513°N 86.9101°W	Double Head Branch	Yellow River
Metts Pond Dam	8 ft (2.4 m)	2019	Eglin Air Force Base; Okaloosa County; 30.5552°N 86.7631°W	Holley Creek	Yellow River
Atwell Pond Dam	12 ft (3.7 m)	2019	Eglin Air Force Base; Santa Rosa County; 30.5612°N 86.8729°W	Poplar Branch	Yellow River
Lost Boy Pond Dam	14 ft (4.3 m)	2008	Eglin Air Force Base; Okaloosa County; 30.6506°N 86.6269°W	Tributary to Turkey Gobbler Creek	Yellow River
