= Okeechobee Waterway =

Canal in Florida, United States of America

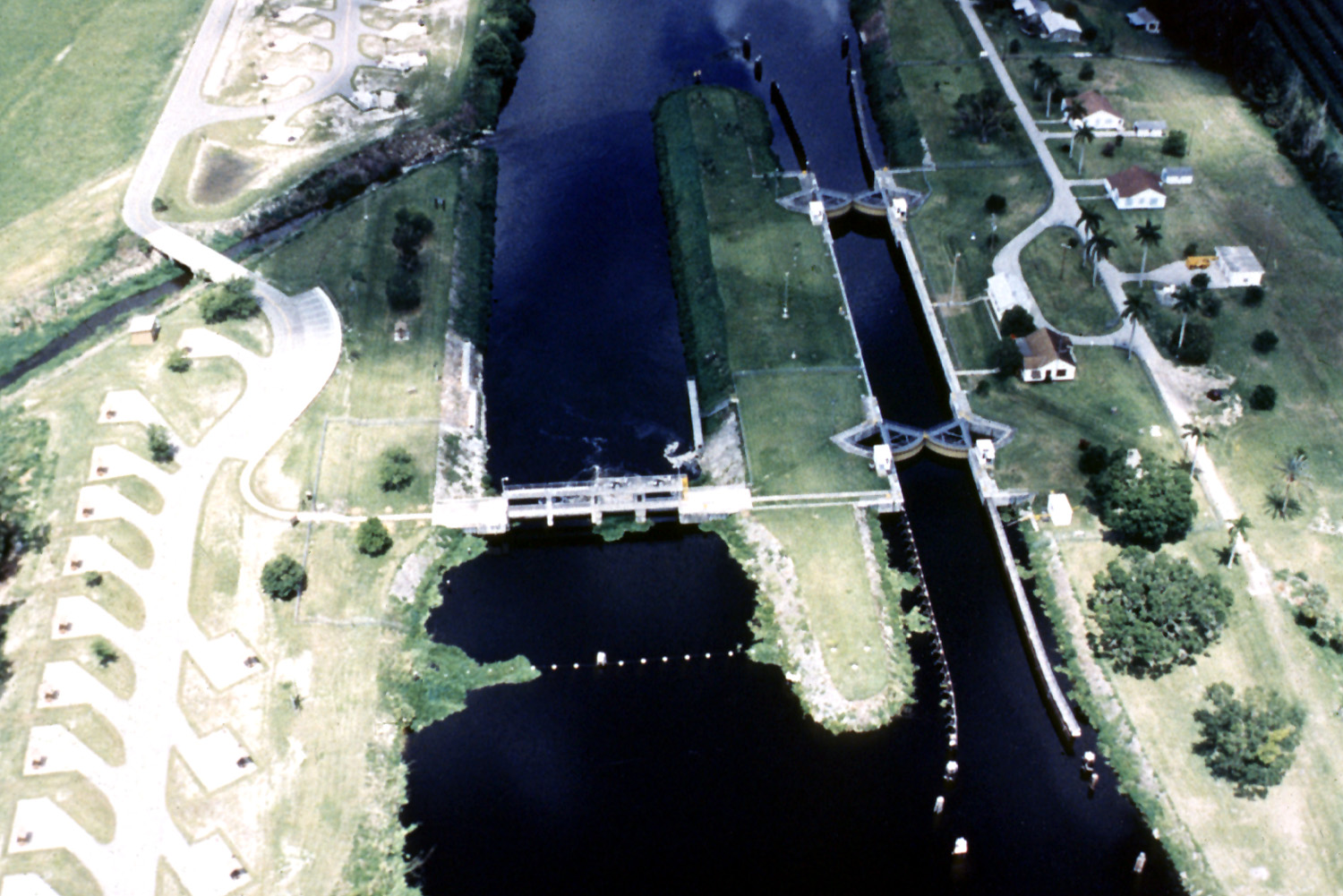
- Ortona Lock and Dam on the Caloosahatchee River, part of the Okeechobee Waterway
- Interactive map of Okeechobee Waterway
- Location: South Florida
- Country: United States
- Coordinates: 26°48′22″N 81°06′46″W

Specifications
- Length: 154 miles (248 km)
- Locks: 5
- Status: Open
- Navigation authority: U.S. Army Corps of Engineers

Geography
- Start point: San Carlos Bay
- End point: Indian River Lagoon

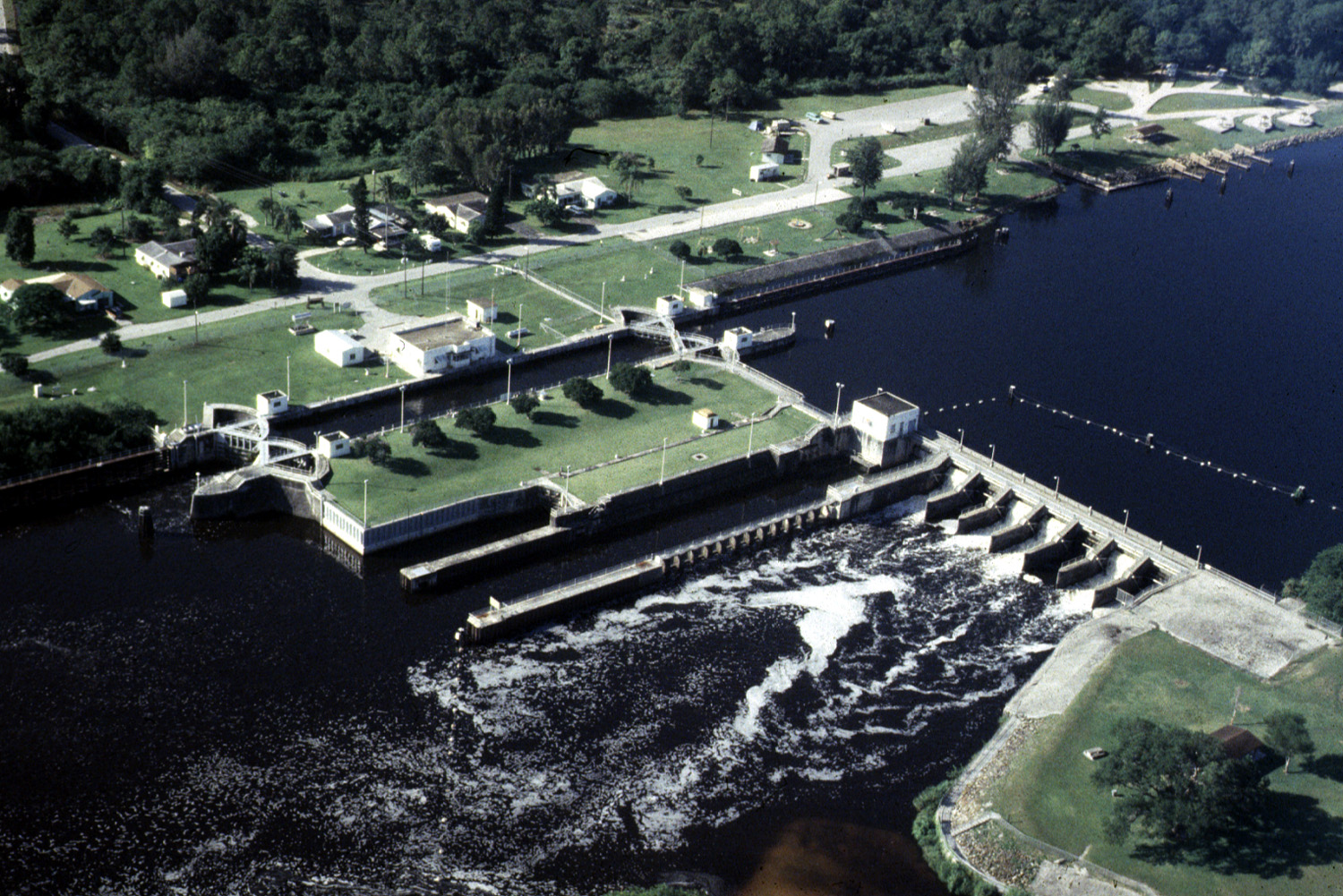
St. Lucie Lock and Dam on the Okeechobee Waterway, approximately 15 miles (24 kilometres) southwest of Stuart, Florida. According to the lock webpage by the U.S. Army Corps of Engineers, the lock chamber is "50 feet wide x 250 feet long x 10 feet deep at low water", showing that the design of the canal system and waterway is for shallow barges and not a ship canal.

The Okeechobee Waterway or Okeechobee Canal is a relatively shallow artificial waterway in the United States, stretching across Florida from Fort Myers on the west coast to Stuart on Florida's east coast. The waterway can support tows such as barges or private vessels up to 50 feet (15 metres) wide x 250 feet (76 metres) long which draw less than 10 feet (3.0 metres), as parts of the system, especially the locks may have low water depths of just ten feet. The system of channels runs through Lake Okeechobee and consists of the Caloosahatchee River to the west of the lake and the St. Lucie Canal east of the lake.

Geologically and geographically, the canal splits the southern part of the Florida Peninsula from the mainland.

== History ==
It was built/finished in 1937 to provide a water route across Florida, allowing boats to pass east–west across the state rather than traveling the long route around the southern end of the state and through The Florida Keys.

== Management ==
Lake Okeechobee and the Okeechobee Waterway Project is part of the complex water-management system known as the Central and Southern Florida Flood Control Project. The projects cover 16,000 square miles (41,000 km^{2}) starting just south of Orlando and extending southward through the Kissimmee River Basin to the Everglades National Park to Florida Bay.

The U.S. Army Corps of Engineers manages five locks and dams along the Okeechobee Waterway.

== Locks and dams ==
=== St. Lucie Lock and Dam ===
The St. Lucie lock was built in 1941 for navigation and flood-control purposes. In 1944, the connecting spillway structure was built for flood and regulatory flow control through the St. Lucie Canal to manage the water level in Lake Okeechobee.

=== Port Mayaca Lock and Dam ===
The Port Mayaca Lock and Dam was built in 1977 for navigation purposes, to permit the raising of water levels in Lake Okeechobee, and to moderate the effects of higher lake stages along the St. Lucie Canal.

=== Ortona Lock and Dam ===
The Ortona Lock and Dam were constructed in 1937 for navigation purposes.

In 1934, the locks were dredged by Captain James B. Cox, who worked on the Hoover Dike, with Robert Pierce as engineer. The first lockmaster was Jack O'Day, then Captain Cox, afterward.

=== Moore Haven Lock and Dam ===
The Moore Haven Lock and Dam were constructed in 1935 for navigation and flood-control purposes. The lock was renamed Julian Keen Jr. Lock and Dam. Effective: 06/18/2021 Notice to Navigation 2021-014

=== W.P. Franklin Lock and Dam ===
The W.P. Franklin Lock and Dam were constructed in 1965 for flood control, water control, prevention of saltwater intrusion, and navigation purposes.

== See also ==
- List of canals in the United States
