= Torry Island Swing Bridge =

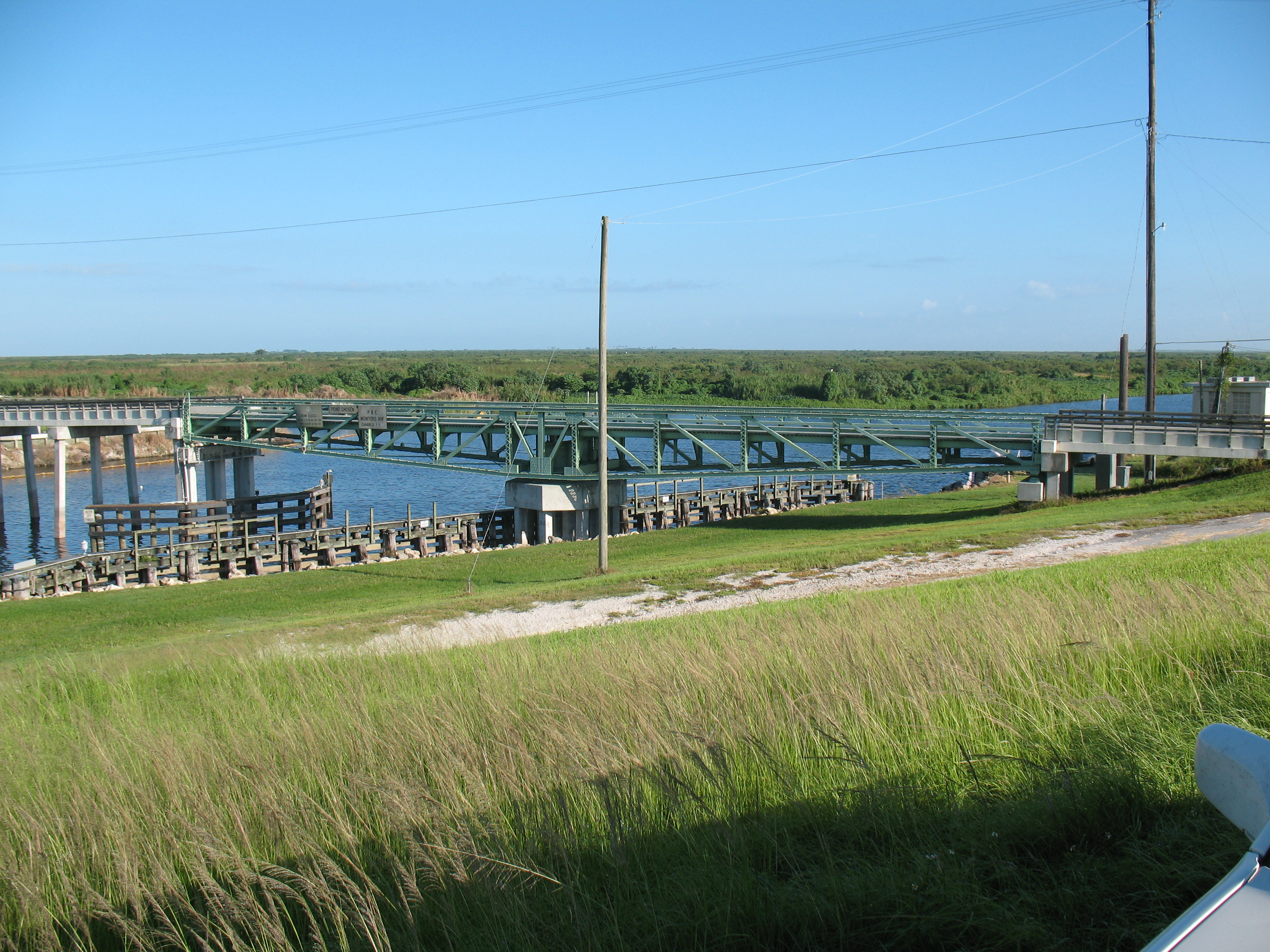
- Coordinates: 26.70549705°N 80.7129884°W
- Crosses: Lake Okeechobee Rim Canal
- Locale: Belle Glade, Florida
- Owner: Palm Beach County
- Maintained by: Palm Beach County

Characteristics
- Design: Swing bridge
- Material: Steel
- Trough construction: Steel
- Pier construction: Concrete
- No. of lanes: 1

History
- Opened: 1935

Statistics
- Toll: None

Location
- Interactive map of Torry Island Swing Bridge

The Torry Island Swing Bridge (also known as the Point Chosen Swing Bridge) is a historic swing bridge located just west of Belle Glade, Florida. The bridge was built in 1935, making it the oldest swing drawbridge in Florida and the only one in the state that is still operated manually via a crank. The bridge connects County Road 717 (West Canal Street) on the east side of Lake Okeechobee to Torry Island, a historic site and the lake's only inhabited island.

The Torry Island Swing Bridge crosses Lake Okeechobee's rim canal and is only one lane wide with traffic lights on both sides of the bridge controlling the direction of travel on the single lane (as well as stopping traffic when the swing span is open). The Torry Island Swing Bridge notably provides access to the Torry Island Campground and is opened for vessel traffic on demand by operations at Slims Fish Camp.

== History ==
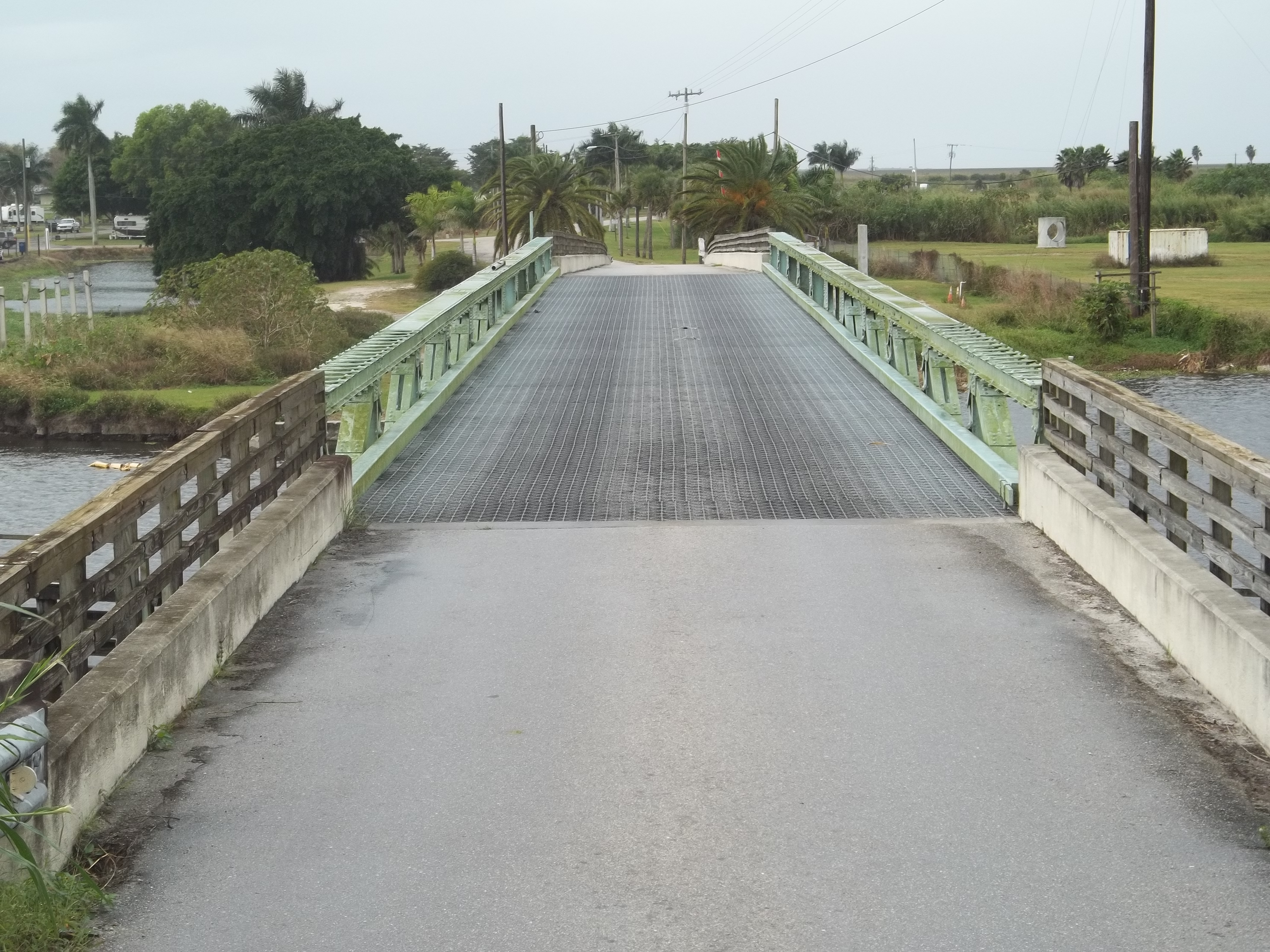
Roadway on the bridge looking toward Torry Island

Built in 1935, the bridge was needed after the construction of the Herbert Hoover Dike around Lake Okeechobee. The dike's construction led to the creation of the rim canal, which needed to be bridged to access what is now Torry Island. The bridge's steel swing span was a recycled span that had been used previously on the original Roosevelt Bridge in Stuart from 1916 to 1934.

The bridge's first tender was Slim Corbin. Corbin was a worker on the Hervert Hoover Dike after moving to the area from Alabama looking for work during the Great Depression. Corbin created Slim's Fish Camp on Torry Island, which is still operated today by the Corbin family and still houses the swing bridge's operation.
