= Cypress Lodge =

- U.S. National Register of Historic Places
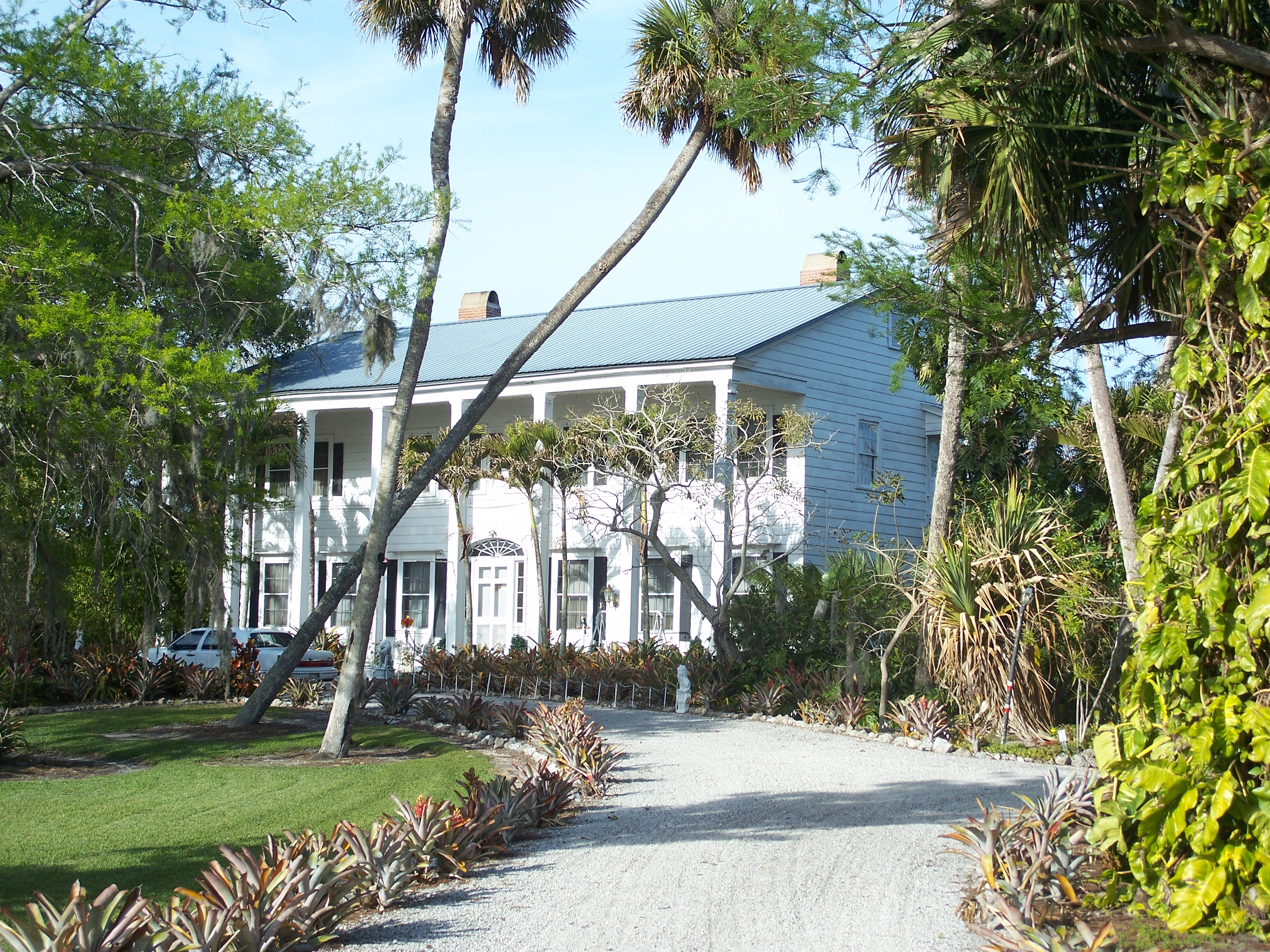

- Location within Florida Location within the United States
- Location: Port Mayaca, Florida, United States
- Coordinates: 26°58′42.46″N 80°36′49.91″W
- NRHP reference No.: 08001040
- Added to NRHP: November 12, 2008

Cypress Lodge is an historic two-story frame country inn located at 18681 SW Conners Highway in Port Mayaca, Florida, United States. The lodge, which served as a hotel, was owned by Bessemer Properties and operated for many years by Paul Hoenshel, his wife Amy Hoenshel and their daughter, Mary Louise Hoenshel Smith. A 3.5 story structure with about 7,600 square feet (710 m^{2}) of space, it was built in 1935 by Isaac Matthew Elkins and is mostly composed of cypress logs and contains

On November 12, 2008, the Cypress Lodge was added to the U.S. National Register of Historic Places. There is also a pumphouse on the property, but it was built in 1972. Thus, it is classified as non-contributing. Bonnie B. Dearborn and Barbara E. Mattick of the Florida Bureau of Historic Preservation noted that by 2008, little modifications had been made to the building.

== History and description ==
In 1932, Henry, Howard, and John Phipps, owners of the Mayaca Corporation, successfully bided for property during a sale at the Martin County Courthouse. After Amy and Paul Hoenshel took out of a mortgage on the property in November of that year, they hired Isaac Matthew Elkins in 1935 to erect a structure for them, which would be known as the Cypress Lodge. Following the 1928 Okeechobee hurricane, Elkins had built homes for the Phipps brothers in the Port Mayaca area.

Sometime later in 1935, the Cypress Lodge opened at 18681 SW Conners Highway with hotel and restaurant facilities. Although the Miami Herald described the structure as having two stories, Bonnie B. Dearborn and Barbara E. Mattick of the Florida Bureau of Historic Preservation reported that the building is three-and-a-half stories. A Neoclassical style-structure, it contains approximately 7,600 square feet (710 m^{2}) of space. Additionally, the building is rectangular and mostly made of cypress logs. The Cypress Lodge continued to be used as a hotel facility until 1991.

The property on which the Cypress Lodge sits used to be 5 acres (2.0 ha) but was reduce to 1.75 acres (0.71 ha) in 2000 after land and the Hemingway Cottage (a seasonal home of Hadley Richardson, Ernest Hemingway's first wife) were sold. On November 12, 2008, the Cypress Lodge was added to the U.S. National Register of Historic Places. Another structure on the property, a pumphouse built in 1972, is listed as non-contributing. The Cypress Lodge was owned by Bessemer Properties and operated for many years by Paul Hoenshel, his wife Amy Hoenshel and their daughter, Mary Louise Hoenshel Smith. Dearborn and Mattick noted that by 2008, few modifications occurred other than a partial enclosure of a back porch in the mid-1940s.

== See also ==
- National Register of Historic Places listings in Martin County, Florida
