= Port Mayaca, Florida =

Populated place in Florida, U.S.

Coordinates: 26°59′N 80°36′W

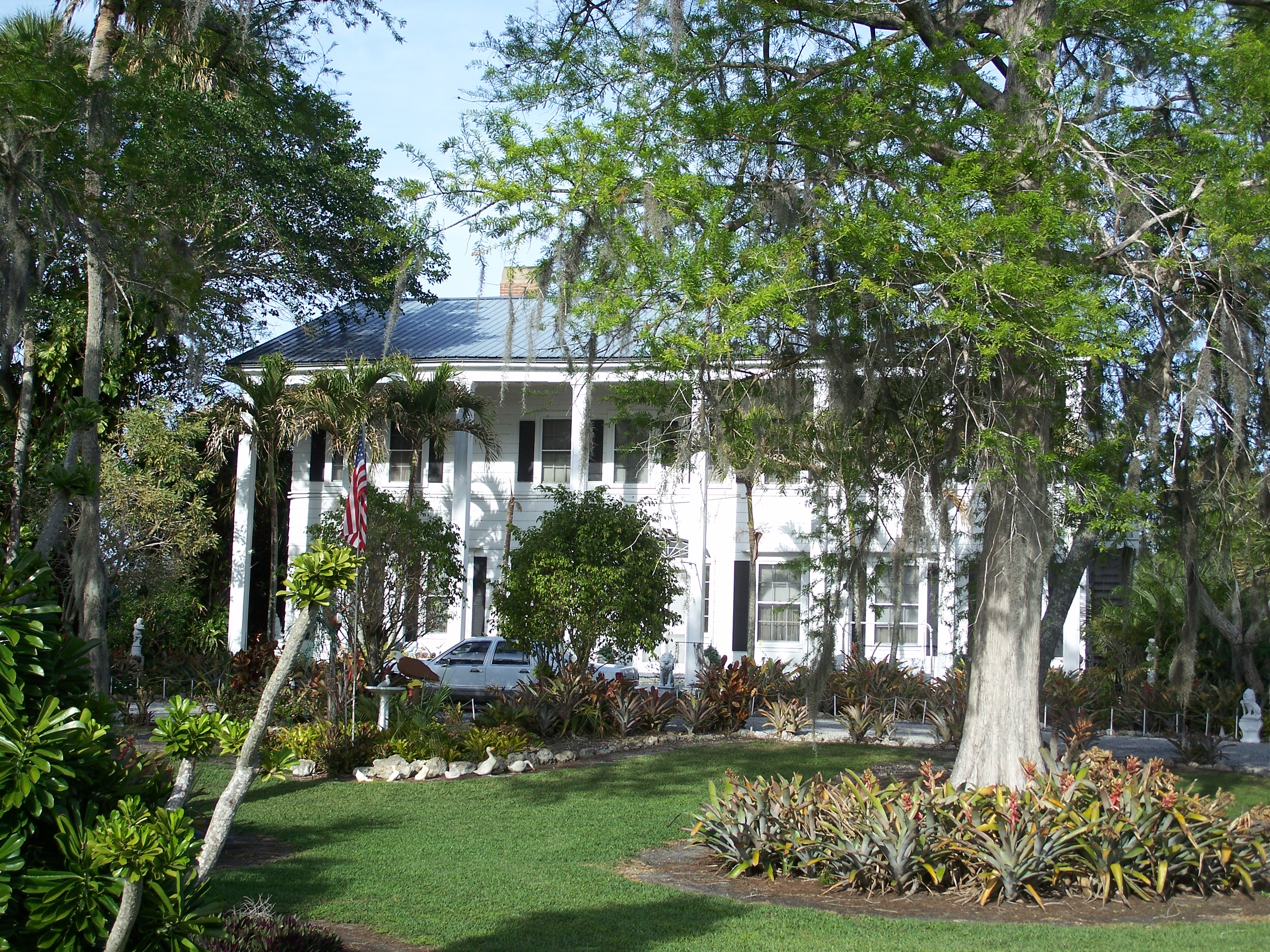
Cypress Lodge

Port Mayaca (pronounced port my-ak-kuh) is located in western Martin County, Florida, United States, on the eastern side of Lake Okeechobee.

Named for the Mayaca Tribe, Port Mayaca is centered just south of the Port Mayaca Lock and Dams on the Okeechobee Waterway (St. Lucie Canal) at the intersection of S.W. Kanner Highway, (State Road 76), and S.W. Gaines Highway, (State Road 15, which is signed as U.S. Route 441 and U.S. Route 98).

There are few houses and businesses at this intersection. Most are strung out North and South along Gaines Highway or east along Kanner Highway. In November 2008, Cypress Lodge, for many years the only inn in Port Mayaca, was added to the National Register of Historic Places.

== Post office ==
The Port Mayaca post office was established on June 7, 1928, and discontinued on June 30, 1958, after which time mail went to the Canal Point post office in neighboring Palm Beach County. Mail delivery for most of Port Mayaca continues to come from Canal Point.

== Port Mayaca Cemetery ==
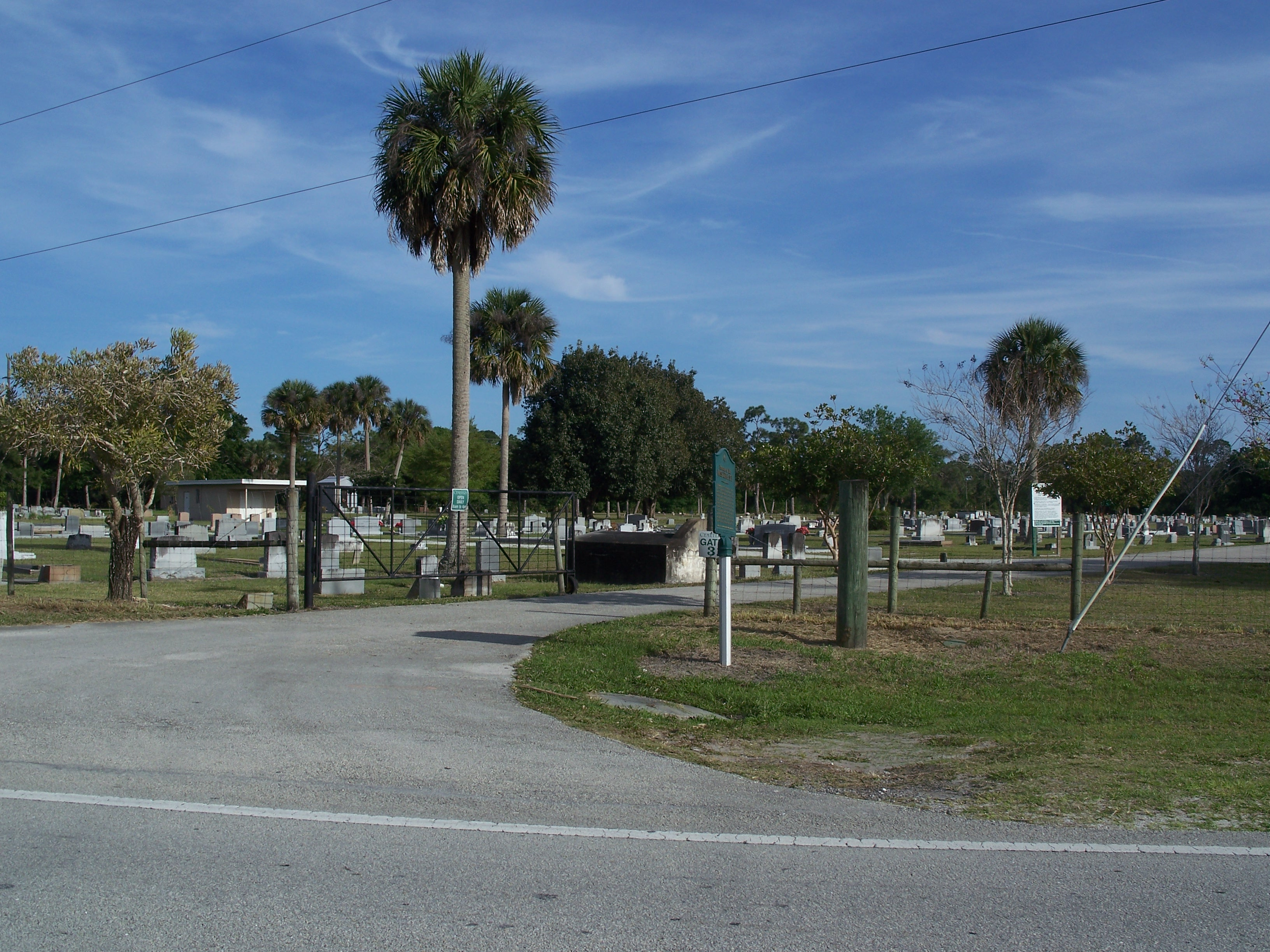
Port Mayaca Cemetery

Located a few miles east of this intersection is the Port Mayaca Cemetery, which was chosen in 1928 as the site for the mass burial of over 1,600 unidentified people who lost their lives in western Palm Beach County as the result of an unnamed Category 5 hurricane in September 1928 and the flooding that ensued after the earthen dikes surrounding Lake Okeechobee collapsed. Originally operated by a trust set up by the cities of Belle Glade, Pahokee and South Bay, the cemetery has been operated since 1992 by the city of Pahokee alone.

== See also ==
- 1928 Okeechobee Hurricane
- Mayaca (tribe)
- Myakka City, Florida, a settlement in eastern Manatee County which uses a variant spelling of the name.
- Old Miakka, Florida, is a pioneer era-established settlement in eastern Sarasota County, that shares the same pronunciation of this variant spelled name.

== Resources ==
- Nash, Jay Robert, Darkest Hours, Chicago: Nelson-Hall, 1976, pp. 321–322.
