= Ritta Island, Florida =

Island and ghost town in Palm Beach County, Florida

Ritta Island
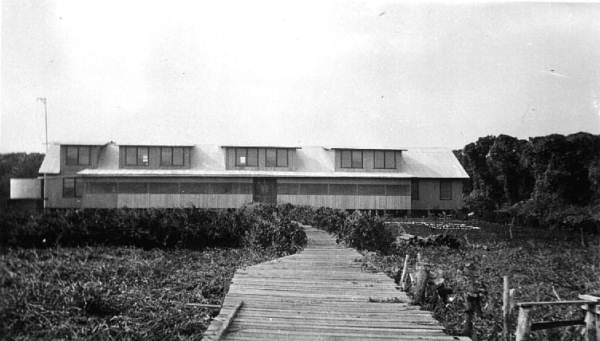
- Island Hotel, Ritta Island, May 1914

- Ritta Island

Geography
- Location: Palm Beach County, Florida
- Coordinates: 26°43′23″N 80°48′22″W
- Adjacent to: Lake Okeechobee
- Area: 3,500 acres (1,400 ha)
- Highest elevation: 13 ft (4 m)

Administration
- United States
- State: Florida
- County: Palm Beach County

Additional information
- Time zone: EST (UTC-5:00)
  - Summer (DST): EDT (UTC-4:00)

Ritta Island is an island and ghost town in Lake Okeechobee, Florida. Ritta Island is located near the southern shore of the lake, and the settlement was situated in Palm Beach County, 5 miles (8.0 km) east of Clewiston.

== Etymology ==
The name 'Ritta' is of uncertain origin, though local tradition suggests it was named for the daughter of an early Lake Harbor settler. Others point to the 'Ritta River,' one of the ancient 'dead rivers' of the Everglades that once flowed nearby.

== History ==
=== Early settlement and development (1908–1920) ===
The modern settlement of Ritta Island began in 1908 when developer Richard J. Bolles purchased 500,000 acres of Everglades land from the State of Florida for $2 each. Through the Florida Fruit Lands Company, Bolles marketed the island and surrounding areas to Northern investors as a winter agricultural paradise.

The first pioneers arrived to find the island covered in a dense forest of custard apple (pond apple) trees. Early residents were tasked with clearing this vegetation to access the "black gold" muck soil beneath. In 1911, Bolles constructed the Hotel Bolles, a two-story wooden structure intended to house prospective land buyers and tourists. By the mid-1910s, a small community had formed, centered on the cultivation of winter vegetables such as tomatoes and beans.

=== Growth and infrastructure (1921–1927) ===
At its peak in the 1920s, the community on Ritta Island was a self-sufficient agricultural hub. Because there were no roads connecting the island to the mainland, transportation was conducted entirely by boat, with steamships and gasoline launches frequenting the island's piers. The island also featured a one-room schoolhouse and several large packing houses. Residents typically built their homes on stilts to mitigate the seasonal fluctuations of Lake Okeechobee's water levels. In 1922, a post office was established on the island, under the name Mabry.

=== 1928 Hurricane and abandonment ===
The settlement was effectively destroyed by the 1928 Okeechobee Hurricane. On September 16, 1928, the storm's powerful winds pushed a massive wall of water from the lake over the southern rim. The surge demolished the island's packing houses, the Hotel Bolles, and most private residences.

While neighboring towns on the mainland like Belle Glade and Pahokee were rebuilt, the survivors of Ritta Island largely abandoned their properties. The subsequent construction of the Herbert Hoover Dike fundamentally altered the local geography, leaving the island outside the primary protection zone and rendering it unsuitable for permanent re-habitation. Today, the island remains largely uninhabited and is reclaimed by natural vegetation.
