= Port Mayaca Lock and Dam =

Coordinates: 26.984531°N 80.621105°W

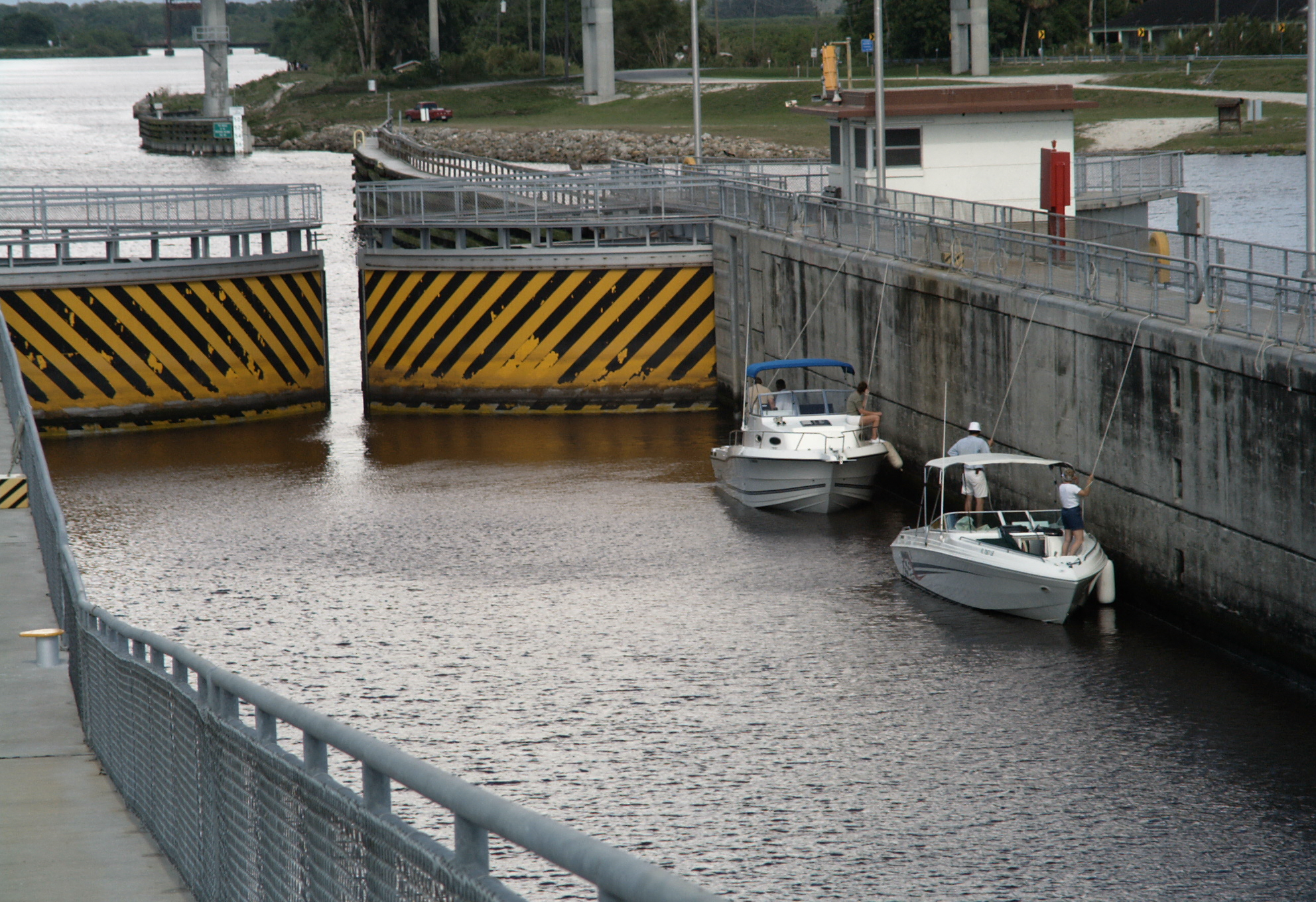
- Boaters anchored against lock wall as canal-side gates close
- Interactive map of Port Mayaca Lock and Dam
- Official name: Port Mayaca Lock and Dam
- Location: Canal Point, Florida, United States
- Opening date: 1977
- Construction cost: $13,100,000

Dam and spillways
- Length: 400 feet
- Width (base): 56 feet

The Port Mayaca Lock is a navigable lock and dam on the Okeechobee Waterway (St. Lucie Canal), adjacent to U.S. Route 441 and U.S. Route 98 at Canal Point, in Martin County, Florida, United States.

It is located near Port Mayaca at latitude 26° 59" 5', longitude -80° 37" 5'.

Port Mayaca Lock is open daily from 7:00am to 5:00pm. New Lock hour as of 1 April 2015.

The total cost of construction was $13.1 million.

== Purpose ==
This structure was created to help raise the water level in the lake, for the purpose of retaining fresh water for agricultural use, city water supply, and for navigation. It also serves for regulating flood control water into the Everglades during hurricane season. When polluted lake water is released into the C-44 St. Lucie Canal, the water carries or can spawn algae blooms that release cyanotoxins that may cause nausea, vomiting, skin rashes, coughing, shortness of breath, and achy limbs and joints. Some suspect that small pets have been killed by this airborne toxin.

== Technical information ==
The lock chamber is 56 feet (17 m) wide by 400 feet (120 m) long, and 14 feet (4.3 m) deep. The lift distance between the St. Lucie Canal and Lake Okeechobee is normally 1/2 to 2 feet (0.61 m). The channel width is 100 feet (30 m), and 8 feet (2.4 m) deep.

The lock gates are "sector gates" (pie-slice shaped), and are made of steel. The spillway is ogee-type concrete, with 4 vertical lift gates.

The discharge capacity is 14,800 cubic feet per second (420 m^{3}/s).

== Radio channel ==
This lock operates on Marine VHF radio channel 13.

== Gallery ==
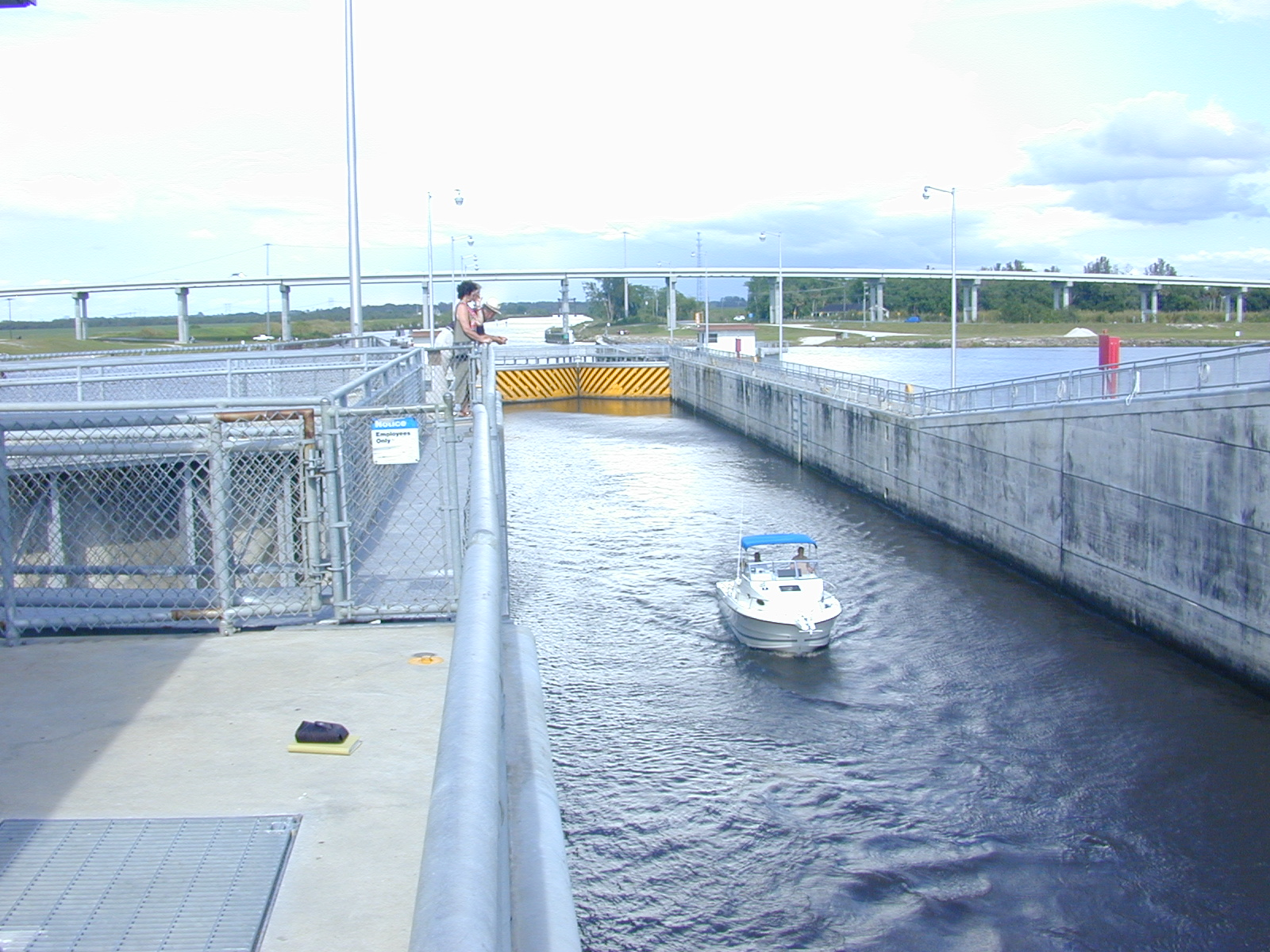
Boater exits as canal-side gates closed behind and Lake Okeechobee lakeside gates opening.

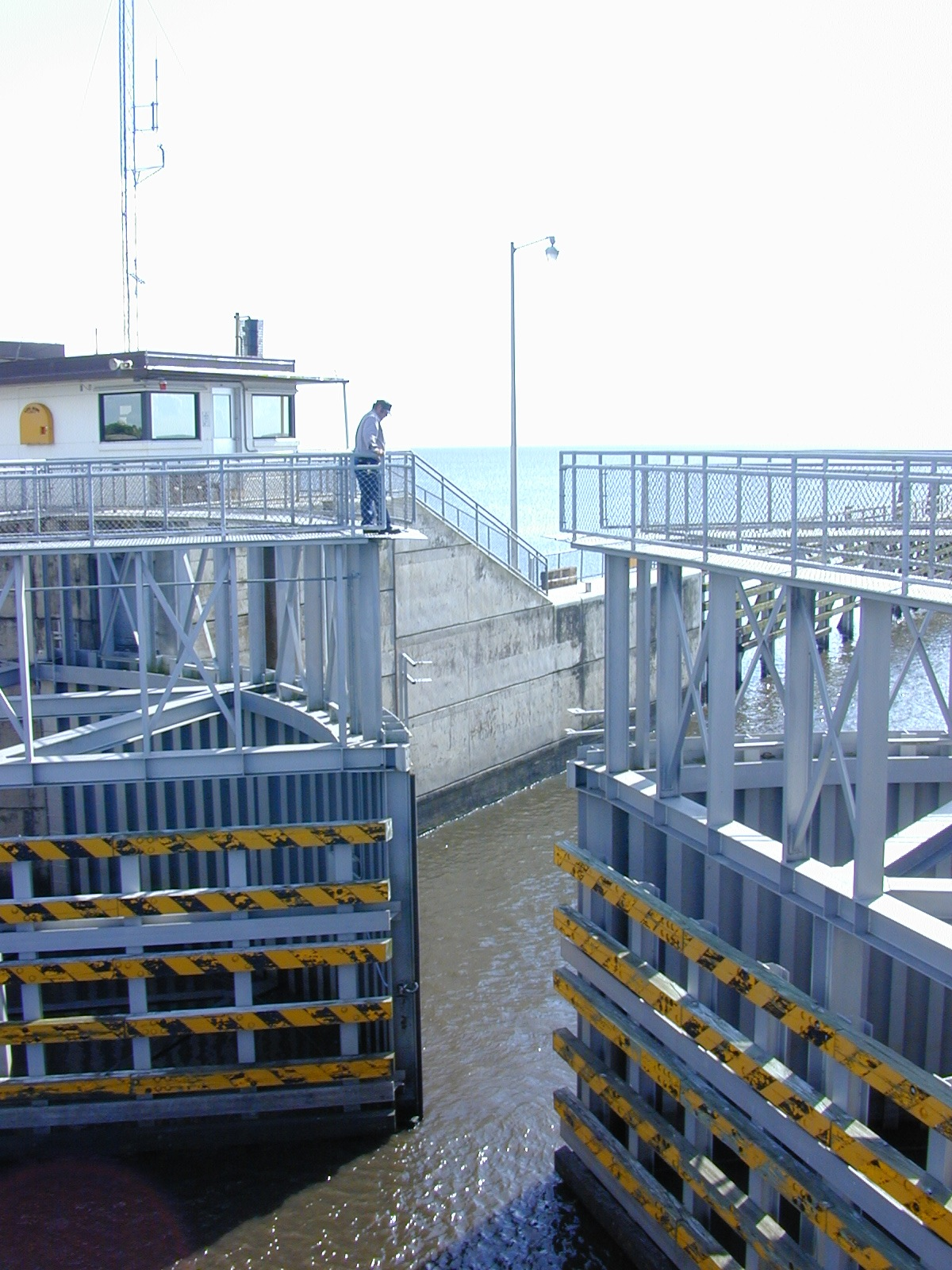
U.S. Army Corps of Engineer personnel overlooks the closing of the lakeside gates.

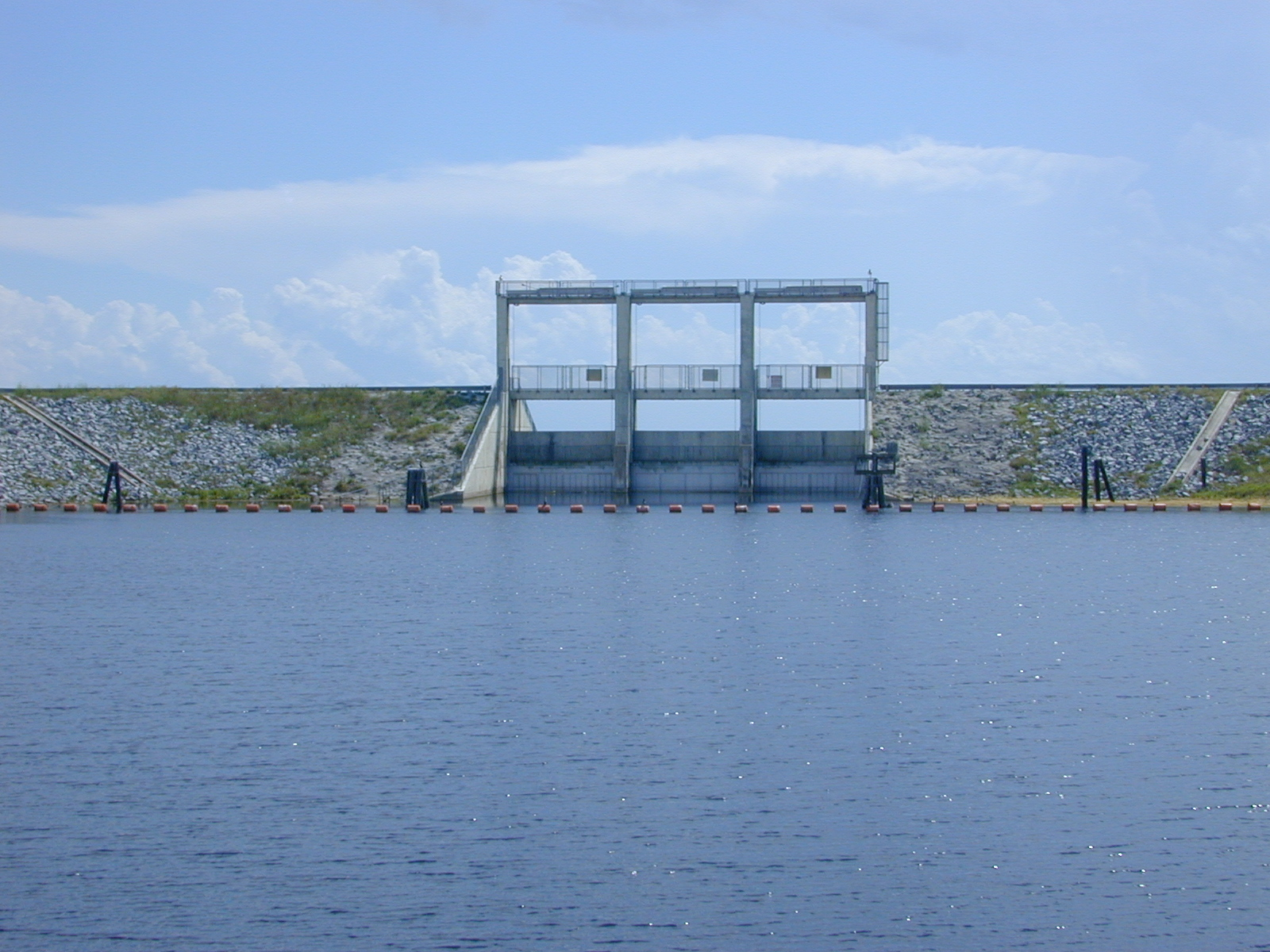
Canal 59 in the foreground and Control Structure S-191, which controls water flow into Lake Okeechobee.

== See also ==
- List of reservoirs and dams in Florida
