= Franklin Lock and Dam =

Coordinates: 26°43′22″N 81°41′35″W

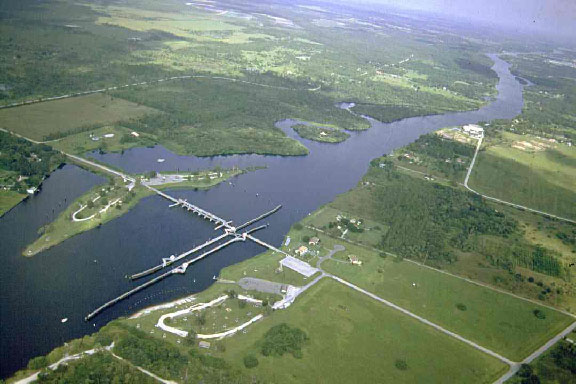
- Aerial view
- Location: Olga, Florida, United States
- Opening date: 1965
- Construction cost: $3,800,000

Dam and spillways
- Height: 14 feet (depth)
- Length: 400 feet
- Width (base): 56 feet

The Franklin Lock and Dam, also known as the W.P. Franklin Lock and Dam, is a navigable lock and dam in Olga, Florida, United States.

This lock and dam cost $3.8 million, and was constructed in 1965. It is located on the Caloosahatchee River approximately 33 miles (53 km) upstream from the Gulf Intracoastal Waterway. The Franklin Lock and Dam was named after Walter P. Franklin (1871-1967), a businessman, civic leader, and mayor of Fort Myers, Florida.

It is located at latitude 26° 43" 16', longitude -81° 41"40', on the Caloosahatchee River about 33 miles (53 km) upstream of the Gulf Intracoastal Waterway.

Lockage usually takes between 15 and 20 minutes. The lock operates from 7 am to 5 pm, 365 days a year, unless otherwise stated in "Notice to Mariners", published by the Coast Guard.

== Purpose ==
The Franklin Lock and Dam were constructed for flood control, water control, the prevention of salt-water intrusion, and for navigation purposes.

== Technical information ==
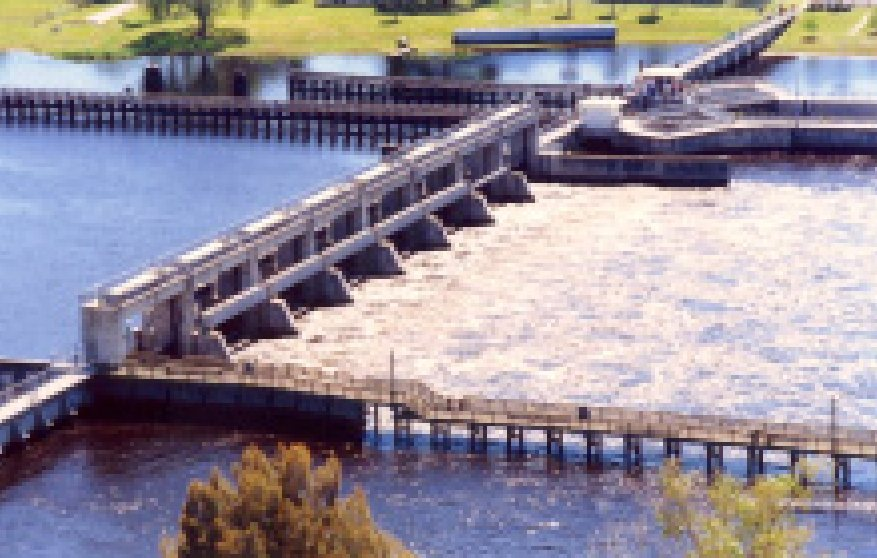

The lock chamber is 56 feet (17 m) wide by 400 feet (120 m) long by 14 feet (4.3 m) high. The lift of the lock is usually 2 to 3 feet (0.91 m) from sea level to the Caloosahatchee River water level.

The channel is 90 feet (27 m) wide by 8 feet (2.4 m) deep.

The lock chamber is concrete, with welded structural steel sector gates, and concrete gate bays. This lock has a discharge capacity of 28,900 cubic feet per second (820 m^{3}/s).

== Lockage ==
=== Vessels ===
Approximately 15,000 vessels pass through annually, of which about 97% are recreational vessels.

=== Commodities ===
About 13,000 tons of manufactured goods, equipment, crude materials, food, and petroleum products are locked annually.

== Radio channel ==
This lock operates on Marine VHF radio channel 13.

== See also ==
- List of reservoirs and dams in Florida
