= Lake Okeechobee =

Natural freshwater lake in Florida, United States

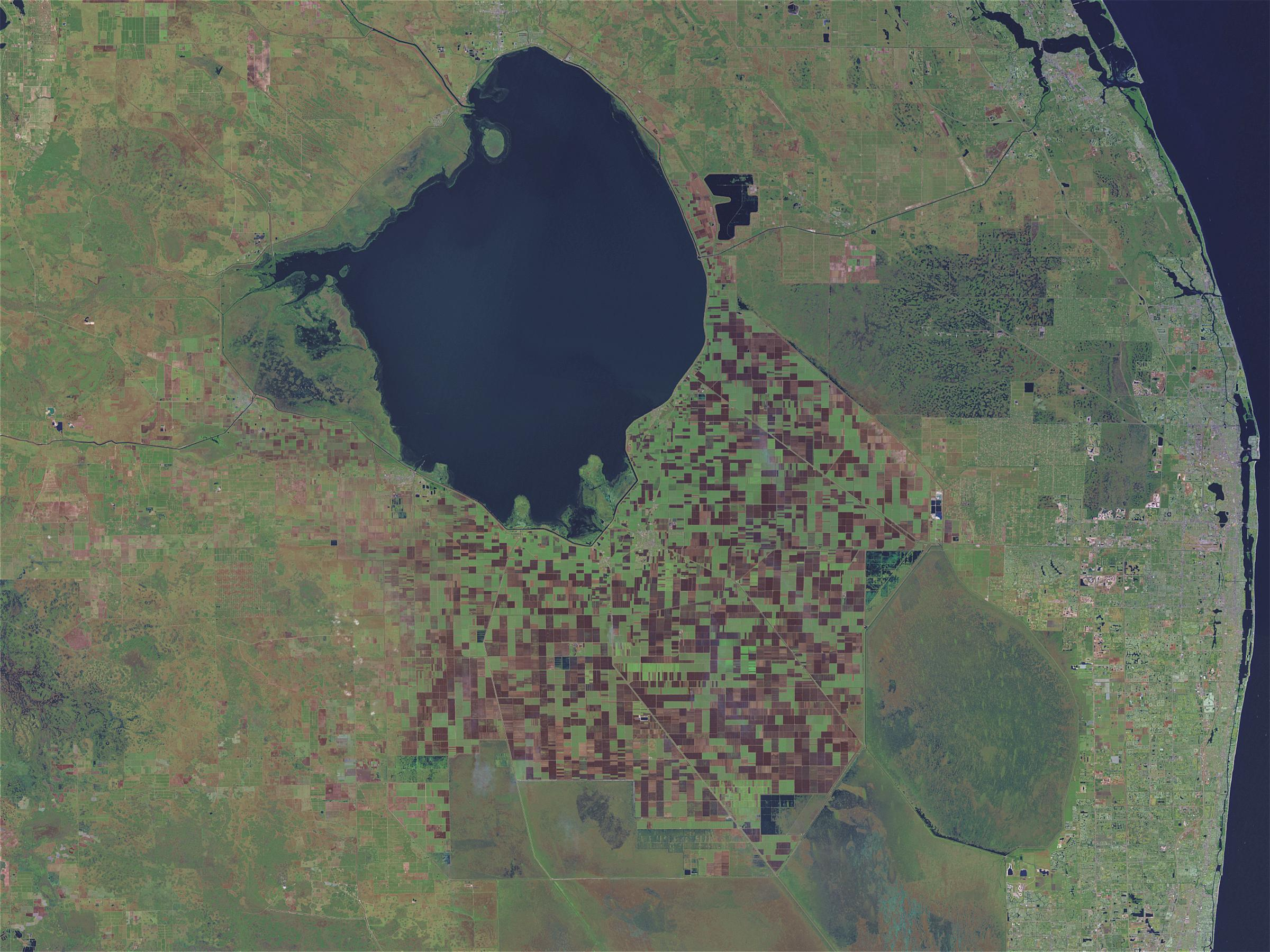
- Photographed from space, 2000

- Location within Florida Location within the United States

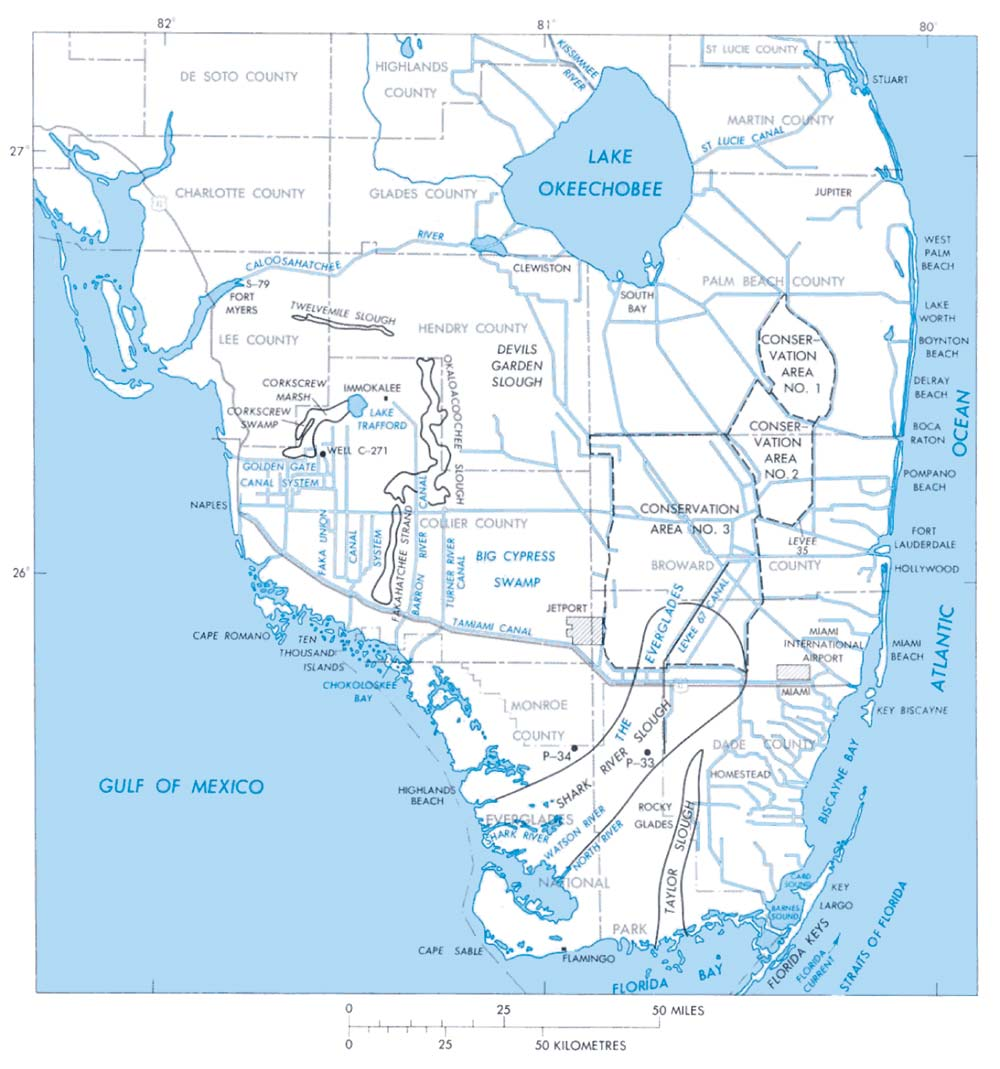
- Shown at the top of this map of South Florida
- Location: Florida
- Coordinates: 26°57′N 80°48′W
- Primary inflows: Kissimmee River, Fisheating Creek, Taylor Creek
- Primary outflows: Everglades, Caloosahatchee River, St. Lucie River
- Basin countries: United States
- Max. length: 36 mi (57.5 km)
- Max. width: 29 mi (46.6 km)
- Surface area: 734 sq mi (1,900 km^{2})
- Average depth: 8 ft 10 in (2.7 m)
- Max. depth: 12 ft (3.7 m)
- Water volume: 1 cu mi (5.2 km^{3}) (estimated)
- Residence time: 3 years
- Surface elevation: 12 to 18 ft (3.74 to 5.49 m)
- Islands: Kreamer, Torry, Ritta, Grass, Observation, Bird, Horse, Hog, Eagle Bay

Lake Okeechobee (/ˌoʊkiˈtʃoʊbi/ OH-kee-CHOH-bee) is the largest freshwater lake in the U.S. state of Florida. It is the eighth-largest natural freshwater lake among the 50 states of the United States and the largest natural freshwater lake contained entirely within the contiguous 48 states, excluding Lake Michigan which is connected to Lake Huron. The name Okeechobee comes from the Hitchiti (the ancestral language of most of the Seminoles in Florida) words oki (water) and chubi (big).

Okeechobee covers 730 square miles (1,900 km^{2}) and is exceptionally shallow for a lake of its size, with an average depth of only 9 feet (2.7 m). It is the largest lake in Florida and the southeastern United States, and is too large to see across. The Kissimmee River, located directly north of Lake Okeechobee, is the lake's primary source. The lake is part of the Kissimmee-Okeechobee-Everglades watershed.

All of Lake Okeechobee was included in the boundaries of Palm Beach County when it was created in 1909. In 1963, the lake was divided among the five counties surrounding the lake: Glades, Okeechobee, Martin, Palm Beach, and Hendry counties. All five counties meet at one point near the center of the lake. It is the only point in the US where more than 4 counties meet.

== History ==
=== Early history ===
While people may have entered the Kissimmee River valley during the Archaic period (8000–1000 BCE), occupation of the area around Lake Okeechobee probably began about 1000 BCE, when the Belle Glade culture, which lasted until about 1700 CE, appeared. The population in the Belle Glade culture area was sparse, with many sites apparently occupied by one or two families, but there are many large mounds and other earthworks in the culture area. European goods have been found in many archaeological sites in the Belle Glade culture area, but little is known of what happened to the people. The area was unoccupied by the time Seminoles settled in southern Florida.

In the 16th century, Hernando de Escalante Fontaneda reported a lake in the interior of southern Florida called Mayaimi, meaning "big water". Escalante Fontaneda also reported that several towns around the lake, including Mayaimi, Cutespa, Tauagemere, Tonsobe, and Enenpa, which were in the Belle Glade culture area, were subject to the Calusa that lived in the Caloosahatchee culture area on the southwest coast of Florida.

Slightly later in the 16th century, René Goulaine de Laudonnière reported hearing about a large freshwater lake in southern Florida called Serrope. By the 18th century the largely mythical lake was known to British mapmakers and chroniclers by the Spanish name Laguna de Espiritu Santo. In the early 19th century it was known as Mayacco Lake or Lake Mayaca after the Mayaca people, originally from the upper reaches of the St. Johns River, who moved near the lake in the early 18th century. The modern Port Mayaca on the east side of the lake preserves that name.

The Battle of Lake Okeechobee was fought on the northern shore of the lake in 1837 during the Seminole Wars. On the southern rim of Lake Okeechobee, three islands—Kreamer, Ritta, and Torey—were once settled by early pioneers. These settlements had a general store, post office, school, and town elections. Farming was the main vocation. The fertile land was challenging to farm because of the muddy muck. Over the first half of the twentieth century, farmers used agricultural tools—including tractors—to farm in the muck. By the 1960s, all of these settlements were abandoned.

=== 20th century ===
In legislation passed in 1905 and 1907, the Florida Legislature created the Everglades Drainage District to lower the water level of Lake Okeechobee and drain the Everglades. Dredging of the New River Canal began in 1906. The North New River, Miami, Hillsboro, and West Palm Beach canals were completed by 1917. The drainage of the lake by those canals combined with a severe drought in 1917 to lower the lake's level until much of the lake bed was exposed, and muck fires burned much of the exposed peat.

Despite the drainage, the lake continued to periodically overflow onto the newly developed farmland near the lake. The Everglades Drainage District began construction of a 47-mile-long (76 km) levee around the southern side of the lake in 1921, from just north of Moore Haven to just south of Pahokee. The levee, built with mud, sand, clay, and shell, was 40 feet (12 m) wide at the base and rose to 21 feet (6.4 m) above sea level, which was lower than the highest recorded level for the lake. The levee was first breached in 1924. In September 1926 the lake water level was 19 feet (5.8 m) above sea level, just short of the levee's top. On September 26, the Great Miami Hurricane crossed the lake, collapsing the levee on the western side and killing approximately 300 people in the Moore Haven area.

The Everglades Drainage District responded by spending $800,000 to raise the top of the levee by 5 feet (1.5 m), to an estimated 27 feet (8.2 m) above sea level, which was 5 feet (1.5 m) higher the lake's normal high level, and 10 feet (3.0 m) above ground level outside the levee. The work raising the levee had not been completed in August, 1928 when the 1928 Fort Pierce hurricane crossed over central Florida and the 1928 Haiti hurricane passed along the west coast of the Florida peninsula, both bringing heavy rainfall which filled the lake. Rainfall and wind from the 1928 Okeechobee hurricane, which reached the lake on September 17, pushed the lake water level to 29.6 feet (9.0 m) above sea level, overtopping the levee and causing vast flooding. The Red Cross reported 1,836 deaths from the flooding, a figure which the National Weather Service initially accepted, but in 2003, the number was revised to "at least 2,500".

Following the 1928 hurricane, the U.S. Senate issued a report in 1929 that recommended enlarging drainage canals, raising the levee to 31 feet (9.4 m), covering it with riprap, and extending it further around the lake, and lowering the control level of the lake from a range of 15 to 18 feet (4.6 to 5.5 m) above sea level to 14 to 17 feet (4.3 to 5.2 m) above sea level. U.S. President Herbert Hoover visited the area personally, and afterward the U.S. Army Corps of Engineers designed a plan incorporating the construction of channels, gates, and nearly 140 miles of levees to protect areas surrounding Lake Okeechobee from overflow, creating the Herbert Hoover Dike. In 1931, the Florida Legislature created the Okeechobee Flood Control District, distinct from the Everglades Drainage District, to be responsible for flood control around Lake Okeechobee and the Caloosahatchee River and Canal.

The enlarged water control structures around Lake Okeechobee and in the Everglades did not prevent either frequent floods or dry spells in which cattle died for lack of water and fires burned in the peat of the Everglades. Then, in 1947, two hurricanes, the 1947 Fort Lauderdale hurricane and the 1947 Cape Sable hurricane, brought so much rain that parts of southern Florida remained flooded for months afterwards. In 1948, the Army Corps of Engineers began work on the Central and South Florida Flood Control Project, described as "the biggest engineering project that the world had ever seen." Florida replaced the Everglades Drainage District and the Okeechobee Flood Control District with the Central and Southern Florida Flood Control District, predecessor of the South Florida Water Management District.

=== 21st century ===
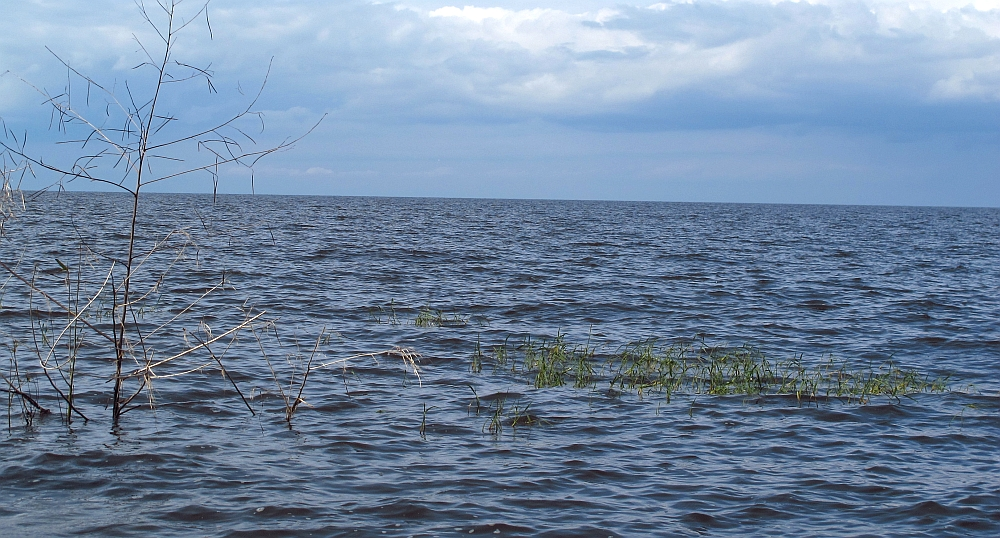
Lake Okeechobee, from Canal Point, Florida

Sounds of Lake Okeechobee, from the Canal Point Recreation Area, Canal Point, Florida, US

Four recent hurricanes – Frances, Jeanne, Wilma, and Irma – had no major adverse effects on communities surrounding Lake Okeechobee, even though the lake rose 18 inches (46 cm) after Hurricane Wilma in 2005. Hurricane Ernesto increased water levels by 1 foot (30 cm) in 2006, the last time it exceeded 13 feet (4.0 m). However, the lake's level began dropping soon after and by July 2007, it had dropped more than 4 feet (1.2 m) to its all-time low of 8.82 feet (2.69 m).

In August 2008, Tropical Storm Fay increased water levels to 2 feet (0.65 m) above sea level, the first time it exceeded 12 feet (3.66 m) since January 2007. Over a seven-day period (including some storms that preceded Fay), about 8 inches (20 cm) of rain fell directly onto the lake.

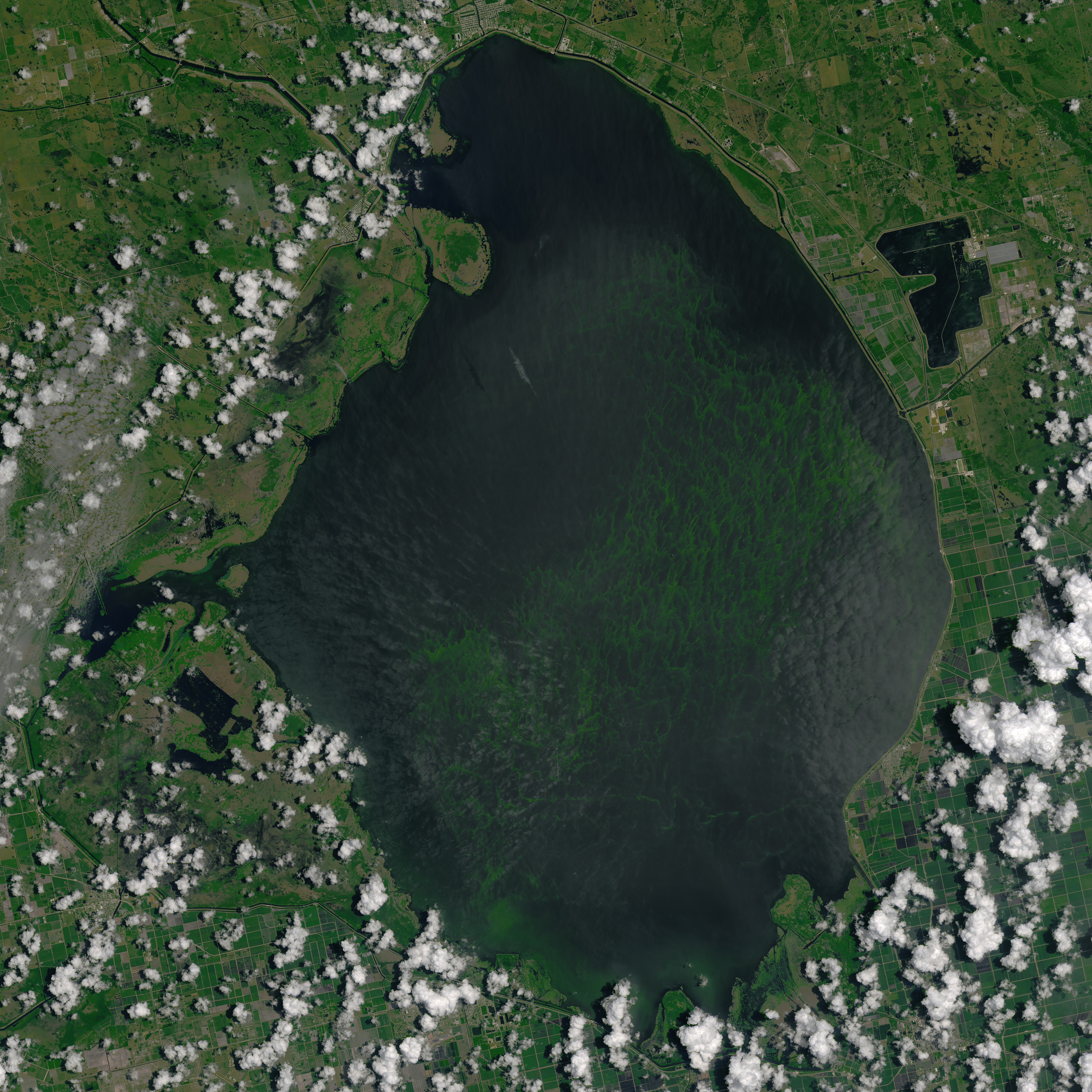
Lake Okeechobee from space in July 2016

In 2007, during a drought, state water and wildlife managers removed thousands of truckloads of toxic mud from the lake's floor, in an effort to restore the lake's natural sandy base and create clearer water and better habitat for wildlife. The mud contained elevated levels of arsenic and other pesticides. According to tests from the South Florida Water Management District, arsenic levels on the northern part of the lake bed were as much as four times the limit for residential land. Independent tests found the mud too polluted for use on agricultural or commercial lands, and therefore difficult to dispose of on land.

Through early 2008, the lake remained well below normal levels, with large portions of the lake bed exposed above the water line. During this time, portions of the lake bed, covered in organic matter, dried out and caught fire. In late August 2008, Tropical Storm Fay inundated Florida with record amounts of rain. Lake Okeechobee received almost a 4 feet (1.2 m) increase in water level, including local run-off from the tributaries.

In 2013, heavy rains in central Florida resulted in high runoff into the lake; rising lake levels forced the CoE (Army Corps of Engineers) to release large volumes of polluted water from the lake through the St. Lucie River estuary to the east and the Caloosahatchee River estuary to the west. Thus the normal mix of fresh and salt water in those estuaries was replaced by a flood of polluted fresh water resulting in ecological damage.

Since 2013, the CoE has been forced to pump billions of gallons of water out of the lake to avoid jeopardizing the integrity of the Hoover dike holding back the water from inundating the surrounding populated area. Some claim that sugar plantations have been pumping polluted water from their flooded fields into the lake, but U.S. Sugar claims back pumping is only to avoid flooding of communities, never to protect farmland.

In March 2015, the rate was 1 billion US gallons (3,800,000 m^{3}) daily. This results in pollution problems for the Treasure Coast, St. Lucie estuary, and the Indian River Lagoon.

In May 2016, 33 square miles (85 km^{2}) of the southern portion of the lake were affected by an algal bloom. The outbreak was possibly due in part to nutrient-laden waters reaching the lake from farms and other sources. Microcystin was found among the other species involved in the outbreak.

In July 2016, the federal government denied Governor Rick Scott's request for Federal Disaster Aid to the Treasure Coast as a result of the toxic algal bloom in the St. Lucie Estuary which was responsible for millions of dollars of lost income for local businesses: this reaffirmed the Federal Emergency Management Agency (FEMA) finding that the lake's water quality was a state issue. The Florida Department of Environmental Protection and Martin County had carried out toxicity testing on the algae, but had not funded any work to clean up the water, and a FEMA spokesman said that "The state has robust capability to respond to emergencies and disasters."

On June 23, 2017, the South Florida Water Management District was granted emergency permission to back pump clean water into Lake Okeechobee to save animals and plants in bloated water conservation areas."

In October 2017, Florida Governor Rick Scott announced that President Donald Trump had instructed Mick Mulvaney to accelerate the repair of the Herbert Hoover Dike. It was estimated that the repairs would amount up to $200 million or more a year to finish the repairs in four years.

In January 2023, the U.S. Army Corps of Engineers completed the Herbert Hoover Dike rehabilitation project after 18 years of repairs. The project was reported to have cost $1.5 billion, and it was finished three years ahead of schedule.

== Uses ==
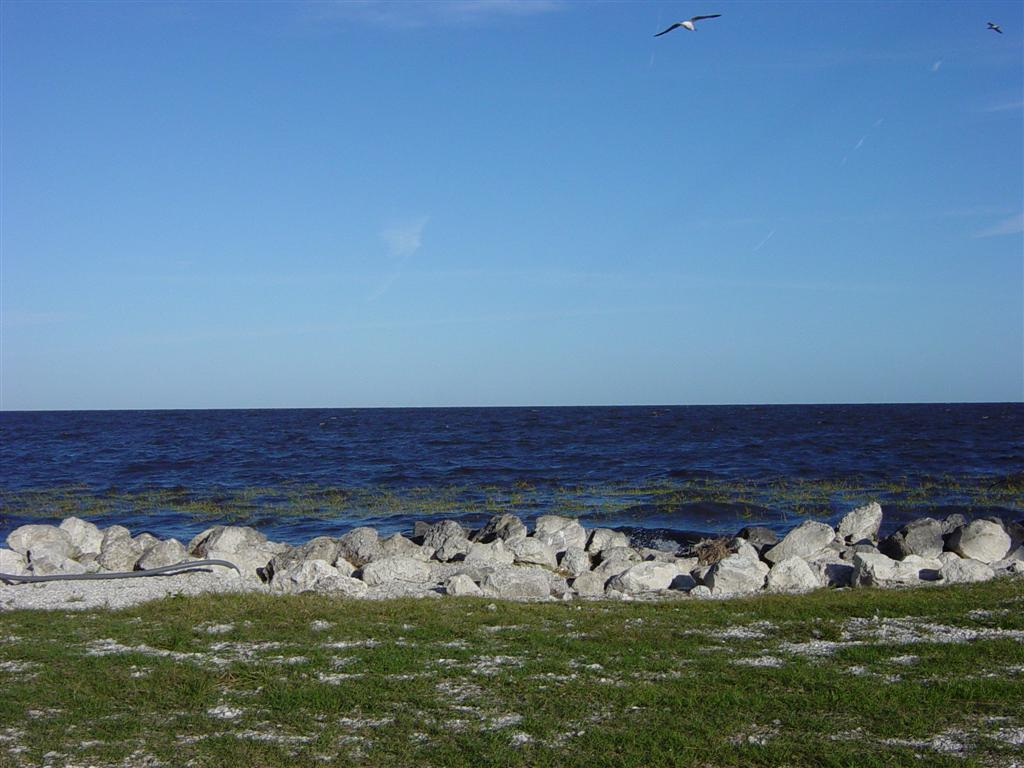
Lake Okeechobee from Pahokee

According to the U.S. Army Corps of Engineers, the congressionally authorized uses for Lake Okeechobee include the following:

- Flood and storm risk management
- Navigation
- Water supply for the following:
  - Salinity control in estuaries
  - Regional groundwater control
  - Agricultural irrigation
  - Municipalities and industry
- Enhancement of fish and wildlife
- Recreation

The 30-metre (100 ft) wide dike surrounding Lake Okeechobee is the basis for the Lake Okeechobee Scenic Trail (LOST), a part of the Florida National Scenic Trail, a 1,300-mile-long (2,100 km) trail. There is a well-maintained paved pathway along the majority of the perimeter, although with significant breaks. It is used by hikers and bicyclists, and is wide enough to accommodate vehicles.

== Geology ==
Lake Okeechobee sits in a shallow geological trough that also underlies the Kissimmee River Valley and the Everglades. The trough is underlain by clay deposits that compacted more than the limestone and sand deposits did along both coasts of peninsular Florida. Until about 6,000 years ago, the trough was dry land. As the sea level rose, the water table in Florida also rose and rainfall increased. From 6,000 to 4,000 years ago, wetlands formed building up peat deposits. Eventually the water flow into the area created a lake, drowning the wetlands. Along what is now the southern edge of the lake, the wetlands built up the layers of peat rapidly enough (reaching 13-to-14-foot or 4-to-4.3-metre thick) to form a dam, until the lake overflowed into the Everglades. At its capacity, the lake holds 1 trillion US gallons (3.8×10^{9} m^{3}) of water and is the headwaters of the Everglades.

The floor of the lake is a limestone basin, with a maximum depth of 13 feet (4 m). Its water is somewhat murky from runoff from surrounding farmlands.

== Hydrology ==
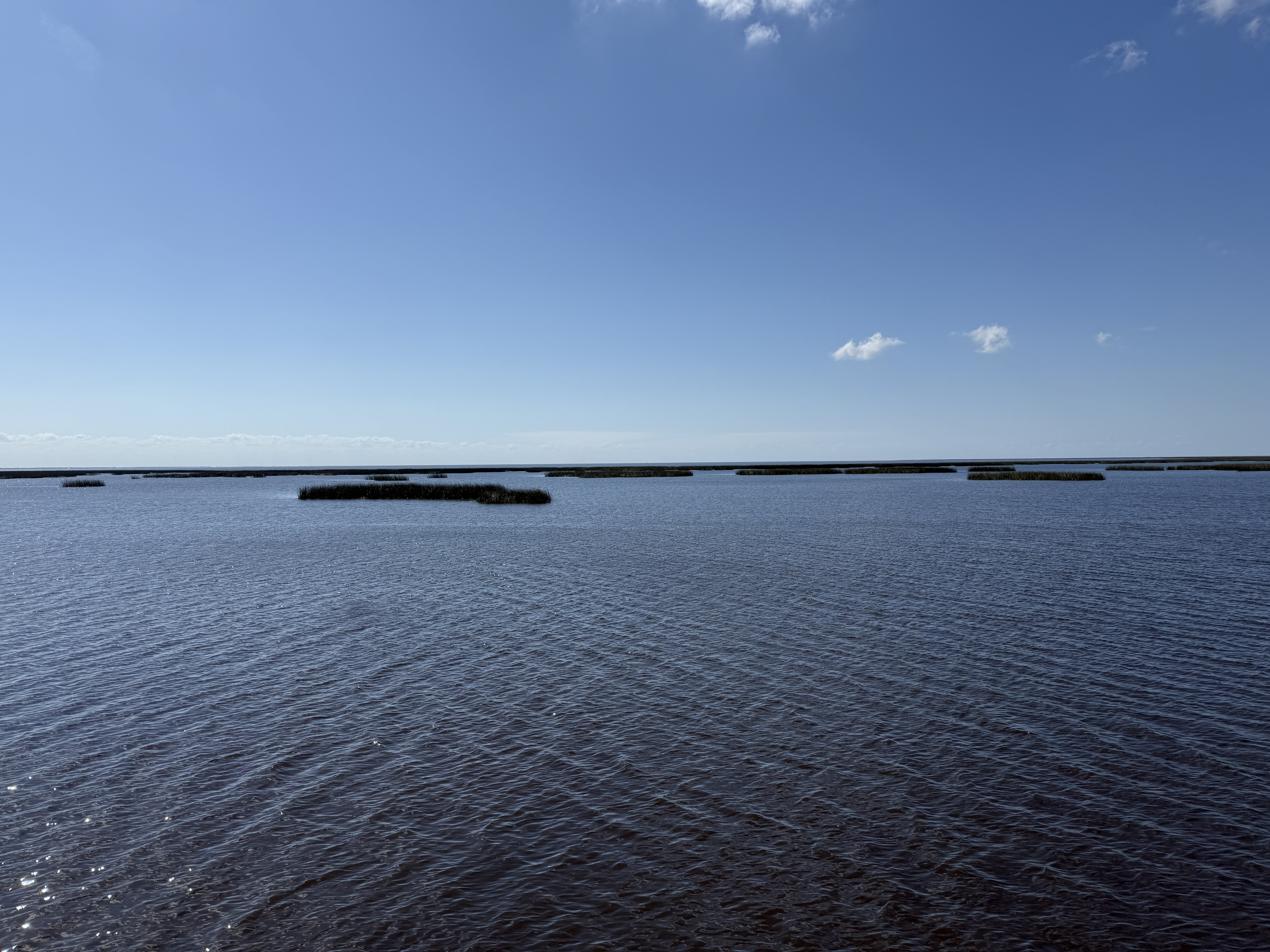
Lake Okeechobee from Lake Okeechobee Park pier

Lake Okeechobee is a shallow lake, with an average depth of only 3 metres (9.8 ft), and has a fetch of 54 kilometres (34 mi). In total, the lake has a surface area of 1,730 square kilometres (670 sq mi). The lake is normally mixed, but on days with direct sunlight and limited wind, the lake can exhibit diurnal thermal stratification. Although daily thermal stratification is brief, a hypolimnion can form during this time resulting in decreased amounts of dissolved oxygen at the lake bottom. Lake transparency, measured as secchi depth, is found to be inversely correlated with the amount of suspended solids in the lake. Suspended solids varied with season with higher amounts of suspended solids in the winter, and thus less transparency on average, and lower amounts of suspended solids in the summer, leading to more transparency on average. Secchi depths not only varied across seasons, but also by location in the lake. Secchi depths ranges average from about 0.2 to 0.5 metres (0.66 to 1.64 ft) in the winter, depending on location in the lake, and 0.3 to 0.9 metres (0.98 to 2.95 ft) in the summer. Secchi depths of 1.7 metres (5.6 ft) have been recorded, indicating higher transparencies than average for the lake.

Water flows into Lake Okeechobee from several sources, including the Kissimmee River, Fisheating Creek, Lake Istokpoga, Taylor Creek, and smaller sources such as Nubbin Slough and Nicodemus Slough. The Kissimmee River is the largest source, providing more than 60% of the water flowing into Lake Okeechobee. Fisheating Creek is the second largest source for the lake, with about 9% of the total inflow. Prior to the 20th century, Lake Istokpoga was connected to the Kissimmee River by Istokpoga Creek, but during the rainy season Lake Istokpoga overflowed, with the water flowing in a 40 km (25 mi) wide sheet across the Indian Prairie into Lake Okeechobee. Today Lake Istokpoga drains into Lake Okeechobee through several canals that drain the Indian Prairie, and into the Kissimmee River through a canal that has replaced Istokpoga Creek.

Historically, outflow from the lake was by sheet flow over the Everglades, but most of the outflow has been diverted to dredged canals connecting to coastal rivers, such as the Miami Canal to the Miami River, the New River on the east, and the Caloosahatchee River (via the Caloosahatchee Canal and Lake Hicpochee) on the southwest.

The Army Corps of Engineers targets keeping the surface of the lake between 12.5 and 15.5 feet (4 and 5 m) above sea level. The lake is enclosed by a 40 feet (12 m) high Herbert Hoover Dike built by the U.S. Army Corps of Engineers after a hurricane in 1928 breached the old dike, flooding surrounding communities and killing at least 2,500 people.

As part of the construction of the Okeechobee Waterway, which was completed in 1937, two channels were dredged across the lake. One channel, 39 miles (63 km) long, runs directly from Port Mayaca on the east side of the lake to Clewiston on the west side. The second channel, the 50-mile-long (80 km) rim canal, follows the southern margin of the lake from Port Mayaca to Clewiston. Much of the earth that was dredged from the rim canal was used in the construction of the dike. In most places the canal is part of the lake, but in others it is separated from the open lake by low grassy islands such as Kreamer Island. During the drought of 2007–2008, this canal remained navigable while much of surrounding areas were too shallow or even above the water line. Even when the waters are higher, navigating the open lake can be difficult, whereas the rim canal is easier, so to reach a specific location in the lake it is often easiest to use the rim canal to get close then take one of the many channels into the lake.

One area in the western part of the lake is called the "Monkey Box", after a strange now-eroded beacon located inside a wooden box on top of a marker pole, which resembled from a distance a monkey's head inside a box.

== Limnology ==
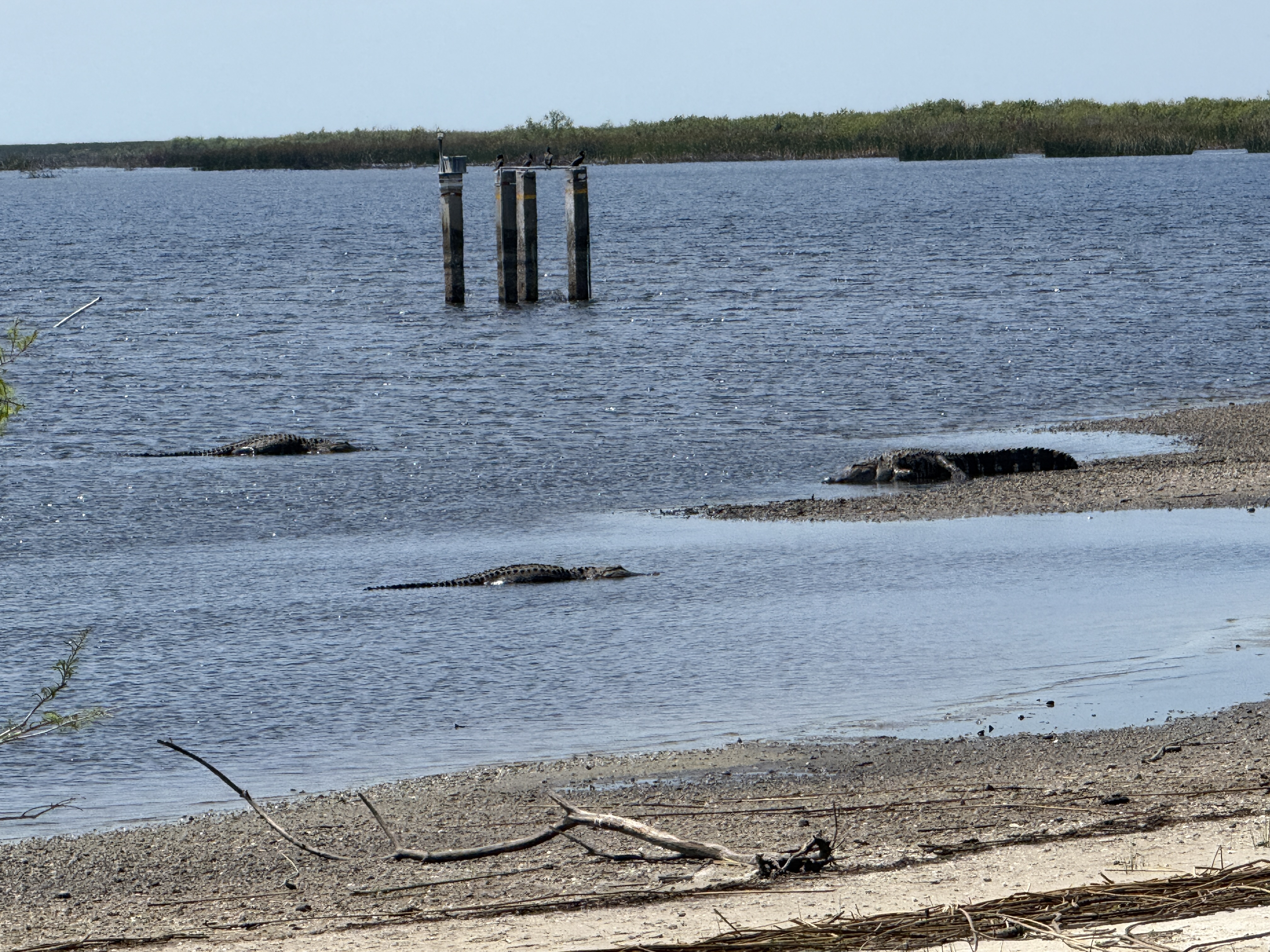
Alligators in Lake Okeechobee

=== Fauna ===
Lake Okeechobee is home to more than 40 species of native fish, along with introduced species, such as the Mayan cichlid, Cichlasoma urophthalmus. Fish species displaying varying distributions throughout the lake depending on seasonality, site depth, sediments, and turbidity. Yearly fish recruitment was found to be positively correlated with increased water levels, providing more substrate and protection. Catfish and bream (Lepomis spp.) are caught commercially, and the lake is nationally known for recreational fishing for largemouth bass and black crappie. Largemouth bass and Florida gar are important predators on other fish in the lake. These fish populations support different wading birds, including various species of egrets, ibises, wood storks, and herons, along with alligator populations.

Fish diets in Lake Okeechobee depend on macro-invertebrates and zooplankton, such as calanoids, cyclopoids, and cladocerans. There are about 60 species of zooplankton present in the lake, including rotifers, copepods, and cladocerans. Larger invertebrates living in plant communities in the lake include grass shrimp, Hyalella azteca, and the larvae of several midge genera. Another important invertebrate is the apple snail, the principal food of the endangered Everglades snail kite. Lake Okeechobee supports over 3,800 different arthropods, including insects and arachnids, along with around 400 species of nematodes.

=== Flora ===
Vascular macrophytes are important in the nutrient dynamics of lakes, along with creating micro-habitats for fish and invertebrates, and providing substrate for epiphytes. Macrophytes provide the lake with oxygen through photosynthesis, along with acting as a buffer for eutrophication by uptake of phosphorus. However, with increased eutrophication of lakes along with climate change, trends are showing decreased richness of macrophytes. Because the fauna are so reliant on the macrophytes for habitat, food, and protection from predation, a decrease in macrophyte diversity and abundance has negative consequences on fauna richness. Macrophyte abundance is dependent on many abiotic factors such as water depth, water transparency and light availability, and nutrients, along with influence of biotic factors. Increasing phytoplankton and algal blooms from eutrophication and nutrient abundance can decrease water transparency and light availability to submerged macrophytes, providing one explanation how macrophytes are sensitive to eutrophication. Some submerged macrophytes that have been recorded at Lake Okeechobee include southern naiad (Najas guadalupensis), Illinois pondweed (Potamogeton illlinoensis), vallisneria (Vallisneria americana), and hydrilla (Hydrilla verticillata). Lake Okeechobee is afflicted with the invasive terrestrial plant torpedograss (Panicum repens). Trees like Bald cypress, Pond apples, Sabal palms, Live oaks and Red Maples are known to grow around the lake.

=== Eutrophication and algal blooms ===
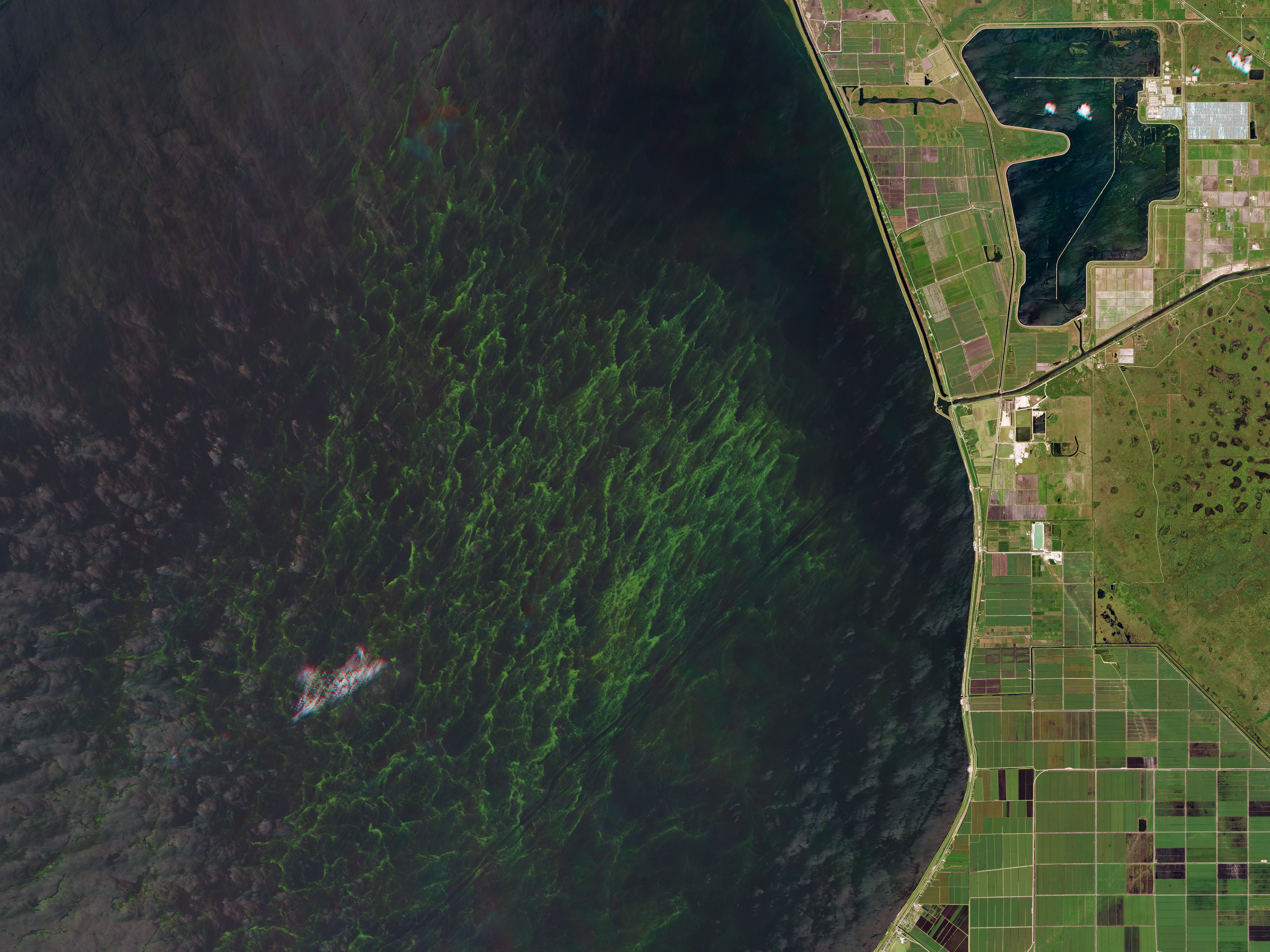
Photo taken on July 1, 2016, during Lake Okeechobee's extensive algal bloom caused by the increased runoff from the weather conditions of the El Niño event

This shallow lake has been previously studied for its algal blooms. Lake Okeechobee is known for its algal blooms in consequence of increased eutrophication. Algal blooms like this can be harmful to the environment, including the lake's flora and fauna, because of released toxins. The vegetation at Lake Okeechobee is important in maintaining the oxygen in the lake on which many aquatic biota rely. There are various species of biota in Lake Okeechobee that are interdependent on each other for food, habitat, and other resources. Multiple limnological studies and related research has been conducted at Lake Okeechobee.

The concerning levels of total phosphorus (TP) began to be noticed in 1970s, and since then inputs of TP have averaged 516 tons per year. These yearly inputs can vary based on the volume of runoff entering the lake. The years 2005 and 2018 had particularly large volumes of water and TP inputs in relation to hurricanes increasing runoff. Despite limiting TP inputs by decreasing phosphorus use in agriculture, Lake Okeechobee has yet to reach the aimed target set by the South Florida Water Management District's in the 1980s of reducing the lake's TP by 40 μg/L. Although proposed by the South Florida Water Management District, this initiative of limiting the lake's TP to 40 μg/L was adopted by The Lake Okeechobee Technical Advisory Committee (LOTAC), the United States Environmental Protection Agency (USEPA), and the Florida Department of Environmental Protection (FDEP), but phosphorus inputs have yet to be controlled enough to reach this goal. Concerning estimates of phosphorus assimilation capacity indicates that even if phosphorus inputs were to be stopped, or severely limited, the extensive saturation of the lake would result in it taking years before improved water quality can be observed. Certain species of aquatic oligochaetes that are tolerant of pollution are abundant in the lake, while mayflies and caddisflies that were formerly common in the lake have largely disappeared, a sign that the lake is becoming eutrophic.

These inputs of phosphorus provide optimal conditions for harmful algal blooms (HABs). Cyanobacteria (CyanoHABs), which need nitrogen and phosphorus for growth, have the ability to fix atmospheric nitrogen. With this ability along with the high inputs of phosphorus, the shallow nature of the lake providing plenty of sunlight, and cyanobacteria's preference for warm waters, Lake Okeechobee is an optimal environment for a cyanobacteria algal bloom. The presence of various species of cyanobacteria in Lake Okeechobee have been recorded since the 1980s. Cyanobacteria produce various toxins, including microcystin, which is not only harmful to the environment, but humans. In 2016, Lake Okeechobee experienced an extensive cyanobacteria algal bloom that lasted from May to mid-July. During the previous 2015–16 winter, there were relatively high recorded temperatures, and higher than average rates of precipitation and storms in relation to the El Niño event. As mentioned, higher rates of precipitation can lead to greater influxes of runoff which unload more phosphorus into the lake, enabling harmful algal bloom. Along with this algal bloom in 2016, other algal blooms have been found to occur in relation to hurricanes and other climate events leading to increased water flow into the lake.

==== Research ====
Research done by James et al. (2009) aimed to evaluate and compare shallow lakes, including Lake Okeechobee and Lake Tai, including their light, temperature, and nutrient dynamics. This research provides important knowledge on conditions that influence algal blooms. They found that for both lakes, wind, nutrients, water depth, and water transparency varied seasonally, and this had implications on phytoplankton abundance. Different locations in the lake may have had different limiting factors based on the light and nutrient availability in those locations. At Lake Okeechobee specifically, algal blooms were found to have strong effects during the winter on the western side of the lake.

In the limnological study conducted by Beaver et al. (2013) at Lake Okeechobee, lake phytoplankton composition was examined in response to conditions of anthropogenic inputs, including nutrient inputs, along with natural events, like extreme weather conditions. Lake Okeechobee was a great location for this study because of its long history of agricultural runoff causing algal blooms, along with its location in the Gulf of Mexico making it susceptible to weather events like tropical storms and hurricanes. From 2000 to 2008, phytoplankton samples were collected using an integrated tube sampler, and weather conditions, including temperature and wind conditions, were recorded. They found that phytoplankton composition transitioned from non-nitrogen fixing cyanobacteria dominating the lake before 2000, to nitrogen fixing cyanobacteria dominating the lake after 2000 and up until 2004 as phosphorus inputs were high and nitrogen was limiting. This time was referred to as the "pre-hurricane" time period, and the period after the 2004–2005 hurricane season was referred to as the "post-hurricane" period. During the post-hurricane period, light became limiting and influenced phytoplankton composition.

Kramer et al. (2018) studied Lake Okeechobee during and after its major 2016 algal bloom that was related to the El Niño event. They collected information on nutrient availability, phytoplankton communities, and the presence of toxins, along with the genetic makeup of the phytoplankton communities and their genetic abilities to produce toxins. Additionally, they conducted nutrient experiments to couple with their findings. They found that cyanobacteria with the ability to do nitrogen fixation were in high abundance during this 2016 algal bloom. During this time, nitrogen was a limiting factor due to the extreme amounts of phosphorus in the freshwater ecosystem. The field experiments conducted with this study found that microcystin, the toxin produced by cyanobacteria, was produced in higher quantities when there was more nitrogen present.

A study conducted by Pei, Zhang, and Mitsch (2020) examined nitrate concentrations, and their respective isotope compositions, in hopes of determining origins of major inflows and outflows of nitrogen into the lake and what their respective contributions are. They found that ammonium based fertilizers and soil nitrogen were the largest contributors to nitrate found in the lake. Manure and precipitation were two other sources of nitrate. These results can aid in monitoring and regulation of nitrogen uses around Okeechobee, and subsequently aid in restoring the lake.

== See also ==
- Agriculture in Florida
