= National Register of Historic Places listings in Martin County, Florida =

Location of Martin County in Florida

This is a list of the National Register of Historic Places listings in Martin County, Florida.

This is intended to be a complete list of the properties and districts on the National Register of Historic Places in Martin County, Florida, United States. The locations of National Register properties and districts for which the latitude and longitude coordinates are included below, may be seen in a map.

There are 15 properties and districts listed on the National Register in the county, and one former listing.

This National Park Service list is complete through NPS recent listings posted September 25, 2026.

Contents: Counties in Florida (non-linked contain no National Register listings)
Alachua - Baker - Bay - Bradford - Brevard - Broward - Calhoun - Charlotte - Citrus - Clay - Collier - Columbia - DeSoto - Dixie - Duval - Escambia - Flagler - Franklin - Gadsden - Gilchrist - Glades - Gulf - Hamilton - Hardee - Hendry - Hernando - Highlands - Hillsborough (Tampa) - Holmes - Indian River - Jackson - Jefferson - Lafayette - Lake - Lee - Leon - Levy - Liberty - Madison - Manatee - Marion - Martin - Miami-Dade (Miami) - Monroe - Nassau - Okaloosa - Okeechobee - Orange - Osceola - Palm Beach - Pasco - Pinellas - Polk - Putnam - St. Johns - St. Lucie - Santa Rosa - Sarasota - Seminole - Sumter - Suwannee - Taylor - Union - Volusia - Wakulla - Walton - Washington

== Current listings ==
	Name on the Register	Image	Date listed	Location	City or town	Description
1	Burn Brae Plantation-Krueger House	Burn Brae Plantation-Krueger House	February 14, 2002 (#02000002)	1170 Southeast Ocean Boulevard; 27°11′47″N 80°13′56″W	Stuart	
2	Cypress Lodge	Cypress Lodge	November 12, 2008 (#08001040)	18681 SW Conners Highway; 26°58′29″N 80°36′48″W	Port Mayaca	
3	Downtown Stuart Historic District	Downtown Stuart Historic District	July 29, 2026 (#100013257)	Bounded by: SW Flagler Avenue; St. Lucie River; SE Denver Avenue; Flagler Park; 27°11′58″N 80°15′12″W	Stuart	
4	East Stuart Historic District		July 29, 2026 (#100013258)	Martin Luther King Blvd; 10th St; Tarpon Ave; and FEC Railway Tracks; 27°11′32″N 80°14′37″W	Stuart	
5	Georges Valentine Shipwreck Site	Georges Valentine Shipwreck Site	July 19, 2006 (#06000619)	Offshore of the House of Refuge; 27°11′55″N 80°09′47″W	Hutchinson Island	
6	Golden Gate Building	Golden Gate Building	October 12, 2017 (#100001736)	3225 SE. Dixie Hwy. 27°09′55″N 80°13′09″W	Stuart	
7	House of Refuge at Gilbert's Bar	House of Refuge at Gilbert's Bar	May 3, 1974 (#74000651)	301 Southeast MacArthur Boulevard, south of Indian River Plantation and north of Bathtub Beach; 27°11′57″N 80°09′56″W	Hutchinson Island	
8	Lyric Theatre	Lyric Theatre	November 12, 1993 (#93001204)	59 Southwest Flagler Avenue; 27°11′56″N 80°15′17″W	Stuart	
9	Mount Elizabeth Archeological Site	Mount Elizabeth Archeological Site	September 14, 2002 (#02001011)	1707 Northeast Indian River Drive; 27°13′40″N 80°12′48″W	Jensen Beach	
10	Old Martin County Courthouse	Old Martin County Courthouse	November 7, 1997 (#97001329)	80 East Ocean Boulevard; 27°12′02″N 80°14′44″W	Stuart	
11	Olympia School	Olympia School	December 20, 2002 (#02001534)	9141 Southeast Apollo St. 27°03′34″N 80°07′53″W	Hobe Sound	
12	Seminole Inn	Seminole Inn	May 31, 2006 (#06000442)	15885 Southwest Warfield Boulevard; 27°01′27″N 80°28′10″W	Indiantown	
13	Stuart Welcome Arch	Stuart Welcome Arch	September 15, 2004 (#04000971)	Between 2369 and 2390 Northeast Dixie Highway; 27°13′31″N 80°13′13″W	Jensen Beach	
14	Trapper Nelson Zoo Historic District	Trapper Nelson Zoo Historic District	October 3, 2006 (#06000918)	16450 Southeast Federal Highway; 26°58′37″N 80°09′49″W	Hobe Sound	
15	Tuckahoe	Tuckahoe	November 30, 2005 (#05001339)	1921 Northeast Indian River Drive; 27°13′41″N 80°12′48″W	Jensen Beach	

== Former listings ==
	Name on the Register	Image	Date listed	Date removed	Location	City or town	Description
1	Gate House	Gate House	November 21, 2001 (#01001246)	September 29, 2026	214 South Beach Road; 27°02′09″N 80°06′16″W	Jupiter Island	

== See also ==
- List of National Historic Landmarks in Florida
- National Register of Historic Places listings in Florida
