= Martin County, Florida =

County in Florida, United States

- County
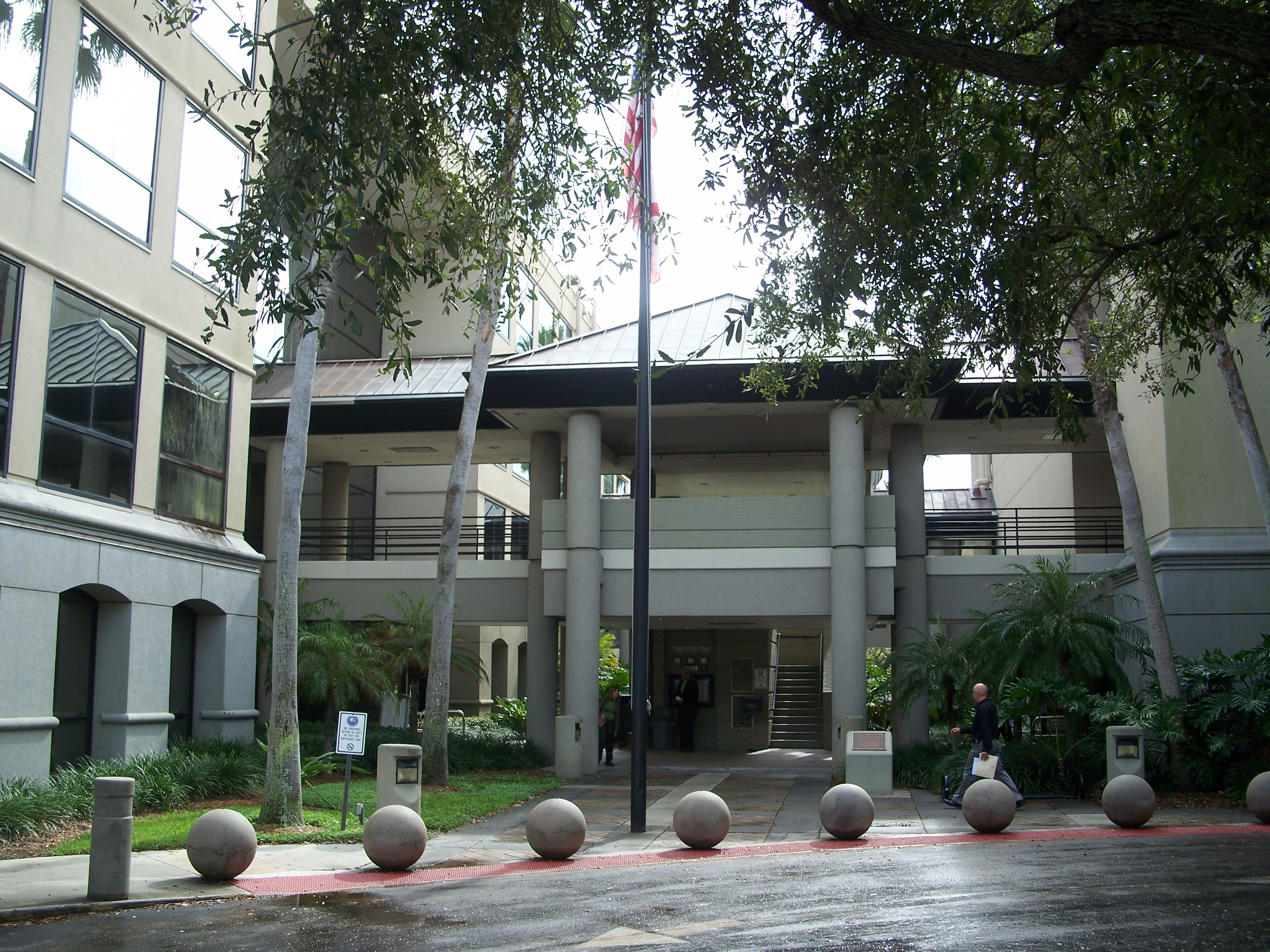
- Martin County Courthouse

- Seal

- Location within the U.S. state of Florida
- Coordinates: 27°05′N 80°24′W
- Country: United States
- State: Florida
- Founded: May 30, 1925
- Named for: John W. Martin
- Seat: Stuart
- Largest community: Palm City

Area
  - Total: 753 sq mi (1,950 km^{2})
  - Land: 543 sq mi (1,410 km^{2})
  - Water: 209 sq mi (540 km^{2}) 27.8%

Population (2020)
  - Total: 158,431
  - Estimate (2025): 166,272 ▲
  - Density: 292/sq mi (113/km^{2})
- Time zone: UTC−5 (Eastern)
  - Summer (DST): UTC−4 (EDT)
- Congressional district: 21st
- Website: www.martin.fl.us

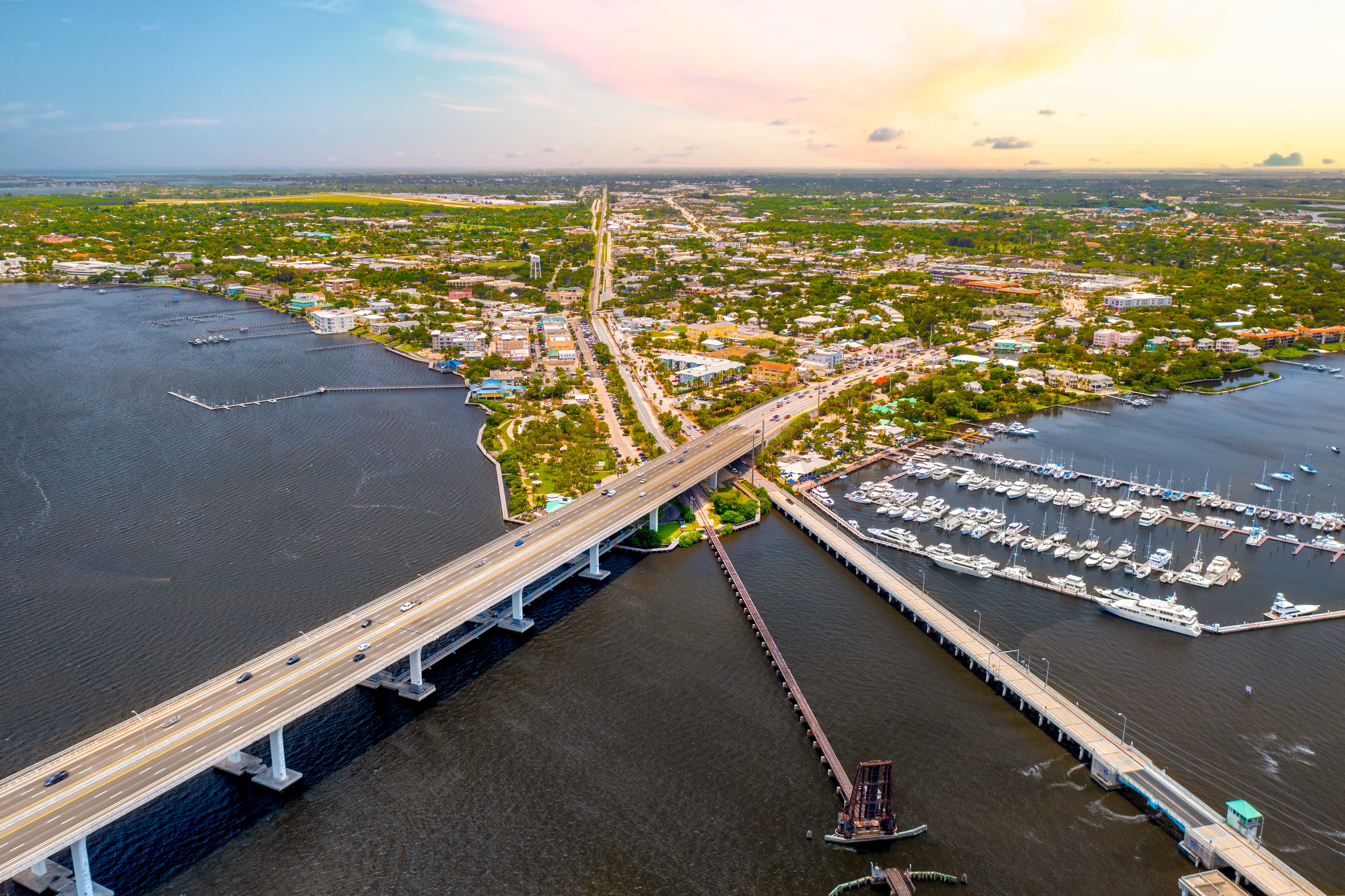
Roosevelt Bridge and Stuart City

Martin County is a county located in the southeastern part of the state of Florida, in the United States. As of the 2020 census, the population was 158,431. Its county seat is Stuart. Martin County is in the Port St. Lucie, FL Metropolitan Statistical Area.

== History ==
Martin County was created in 1925 with the northern portion coming from St. Lucie County and southern portion coming from Palm Beach County. It was named for John W. Martin, Governor of Florida from 1925 to 1929.

When the county was created, the western contour followed the shore of Lake Okeechobee, as did the borders of Glades, Okeechobee, and Hendry counties. Palm Beach County had historically claimed all of the surface of the lake as part of its area, to its benefit for the distribution of state and federal highway funds. The state representative of Martin County, William Ralph Scott of Stuart, initiated a bill to divide the lake among its adjacent counties, creating a more equitable distribution of state funds for road creation and maintenance. All bordering counties confirmed the justice of this change and supported its ratification, with the exception of Palm Beach County. Representatives from Palm Beach County later presented Representative Scott with a jug of water, signifying "all the water Bill Scott left Palm Beach County." The jug is in the possession of Stuart Heritage.

== Geography ==
Hobe Sound, FL

Climate chart (precipitation, max. and min. temperature)
J	F	M	A	M	J	J	A	S	O	N	D
2.4 73 51	2.6 75 53	3.9 78 57	2.9 82 61	3.5 86 67	6.9 89 71	6.3 91 73	7.3 91 73	7.1 89 72	5 85 67	3.1 80 60	2.4 75 55
- █ Average max. and min. temperatures in °F
- █ Precipitation totals in inches
Metric conversion
J	F	M	A	M	J	J	A	S	O	N	D
61 23 11	66 24 12	99 26 14	74 28 16	89 30 19	175 32 22	160 33 23	185 33 23	180 32 22	127 29 20	79 27 16	61 24 13
- █ Average max. and min. temperatures in °C
- █ Precipitation totals in mm

According to the U.S. Census Bureau, the county has a total area of 753 square miles (1,950 km^{2}), of which 543 square miles (1,410 km^{2}) is land and (27.8%) is water. It is the 54th largest county in Florida by land area, and 53rd largest by total area.

=== Adjacent counties ===
- St. Lucie County – north
- Palm Beach County – south
- Hendry County – southwest
- Glades County – southwest
- Okeechobee County – northwest

=== National protected area ===
- Hobe Sound National Wildlife Refuge

== Environment ==
=== Martin County Shore Protection Project ===
According to the U.S. Army Corps of Engineers, the Martin County Shore Protection Project includes nourishment of approximately 3.75 miles of beach extending from the St. Lucie County line south to the Stuart Public Beach Park in Martin County. Included in the project is restoration of the primary dune and a 35-foot-wide protective berm. The renourishment interval for this project is every 7 years.

The last renourishment of the Martin County Shore Protection Project was completed in May 2013 and included a Flood Control and Coastal Emergency component due impacts incurred with the passage of Hurricane Sandy in 2012. The next renourishment event is scheduled for 2019.

The estimated total cost of this project is $69.9 million, $32.5 million of which is to be paid for by the U.S. Federal Government. In Fiscal Year 2015, no funding was appropriated to the project by the U.S. Congress. In the Fiscal Year 2016 U.S. President's Budget Request to the U.S. Congress, no funding dollars was requested for the project.

== Demographics ==
Historical population
Census	Pop.	Note	%±
1930	5,111		—
1940	6,295		23.2%
1950	7,807		24.0%
1960	16,932		116.9%
1970	28,035		65.6%
1980	64,014		128.3%
1990	100,900		57.6%
2000	126,731		25.6%
2010	146,318		15.5%
2020	158,431		8.3%
2025 (est.)	166,272	▲	4.9%
U.S. Decennial Census; 1790-1960 1900-1990; 1990-2000 2010-2019

=== 2020 census ===
As of the 2020 census, the county had a population of 158,431, a median age of 53.3 years, 16.5% of residents under the age of 18, and 31.4% of residents 65 years of age or older. For every 100 females there were 97.3 males, and for every 100 females age 18 and over there were 95.8 males.

As of the 2020 census, there were 68,750 households, of which 20.8% had children under the age of 18 living in them, 49.0% were married-couple households, 17.6% were households with a male householder and no spouse or partner present, and 27.1% were households with a female householder and no spouse or partner present. About 31.3% of all households were made up of individuals, 18.9% had someone living alone who was 65 years of age or older, and 40,328 families resided in the county.

As of the 2020 census, there were 81,371 housing units, of which 15.5% were vacant; among occupied units, 77.4% were owner-occupied and 22.6% were renter-occupied, with homeowner and rental vacancy rates of 2.1% and 9.8%, respectively.

As of the 2020 census, the racial makeup of the county was 78.6% White, 4.8% Black or African American, 0.8% American Indian and Alaska Native, 1.4% Asian, less than 0.1% Native Hawaiian and Pacific Islander, 5.8% from some other race, and 8.6% from two or more races; Hispanic or Latino residents of any race comprised 15.3% of the population.

As of the 2020 census, 92.7% of residents lived in urban areas, while 7.3% lived in rural areas.

=== Racial and ethnic composition ===
Martin County, Florida – Racial and ethnic composition Note: the US Census treats Hispanic/Latino as an ethnic category. This table excludes Latinos from the racial categories and assigns them to a separate category. Hispanics/Latinos may be of any race.
Race / Ethnicity (NH = Non-Hispanic)	Pop 1980	Pop 1990	Pop 2000	Pop 2010	Pop 2020	% 1980	% 1990	% 2000	% 2010	% 2020
White alone (NH)	56,935	89,596	108,741	117,532	119,216	88.94%	88.80%	85.80%	80.33%	75.25%
Black or African American alone (NH)	4,668	5,887	6,482	7,493	7,277	7.29%	5.83%	5.11%	5.12%	4.59%
Native American or Alaska Native alone (NH)	62	138	207	248	218	0.10%	0.14%	0.16%	0.17%	0.14%
Asian alone (NH)	195	503	745	1,510	2,246	0.30%	0.50%	0.59%	1.03%	1.42%
Native Hawaiian or Pacific Islander alone (NH)	x	x	36	52	42	x	x	0.03%	0.04%	0.03%
Other race alone (NH)	70	48	81	139	525	0.11%	0.05%	0.06%	0.09%	0.33%
Mixed race or Multiracial (NH)	x	x	933	1,463	4,720	x	x	0.74%	1.00%	2.98%
Hispanic or Latino (any race)	2,084	4,728	9,506	17,881	24,187	3.26%	4.69%	7.50%	12.22%	15.27%
Total	64,014	100,900	126,731	146,318	158,431	100.00%	100.00%	100.00%	100.00%	100.00%

=== 2000 census ===
As of the census of 2000, there were 126,731 people, 55,288 households, and 36,213 families residing in the county. The population density was 228 per square mile (88/km^{2}). There were 65,471 housing units at an average density of 118 per square mile (46/km^{2}). The racial makeup of the county was 89.88% White, 5.27% Black or African American, 0.30% Native American, 0.60% Asian, 0.10% Pacific Islander, 2.72% from other races, and 1.14% from two or more races. 7.50% of the population were Hispanic or Latino of any race.

In 2000 there were 55,288 households, out of which 21.50% had children under the age of 18 living with them, 55.00% were married couples living together, 7.40% had a female householder with no husband present, and 34.50% were non-families. 29.00% of all households were made up of individuals, and 16.00% had someone living alone who was 65 years of age or older. The average household size was 2.23 and the average family size was 2.71.

In the county, 18.60% of the population was under the age of 18, 5.30% was from 18 to 24, 22.90% from 25 to 44, 24.90% from 45 to 64, and 28.20% was 65 years of age or older. The median age was 47 years. For every 100 females, there were 96.40 males. For every 100 females age 18 and over, there were 94.20 males.

The median income for a household in the county was $43,083, and the median income for a family was $53,244. Males had a median income of $36,133 versus $27,000 for females. The per capita income for the county was $29,584. About 5.60% of families and 8.80% of the population were below the poverty line, including 13.80% of those under age 18 and 5.20% of those age 65 or over.

== Transportation ==
=== Airports ===
- Indiantown Airport
- Naked Lady Ranch Airport (private)
- Witham Field

=== Major highways ===
- I-95
- Florida's Turnpike
- US 1
- US 98
- US 441
- SR A1A
- SR 76
- CR 707
- SR 710
- SR 714
- SR 732

=== Buses ===
Martin County Public Transit (MARTY) is the fixed-route public bus service operated by the county.

=== Intercity rail ===
Brightline officially announced that an infill station on the Treasure Coast would be built in Stuart and begin service by 2028.

=== Trails ===
The Lake Okeechobee Scenic Trail, a segment of the Florida National Scenic Trail, passes through Martin County.

== Government ==
Martin County is a non-chartered county and its form of government is prescribed by the Florida Constitution and Florida Statutes, as follows:

=== Board of County Commissioners ===
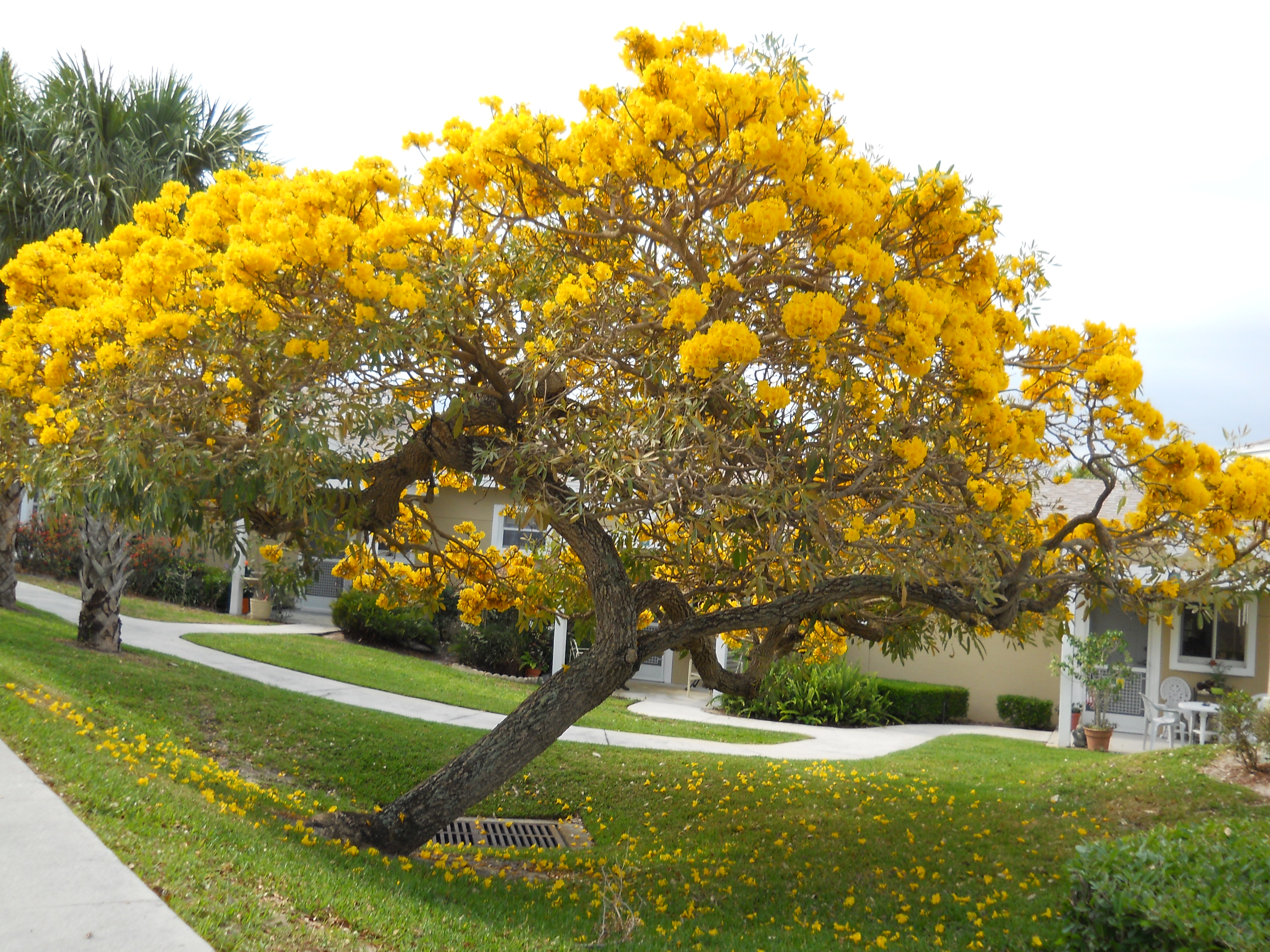
Tabebuia off Savanna Road in Jensen Beach. April 2010. Typical of such trees blooming throughout Martin county in the spring

The Board of County Commissioners is the legislative body of the county and has charge of all county executive and administrative functions, except those assigned by the Constitution to independent county officers or to the independent school district. The board also has some quasi-judicial functions. Some of functions exercised by the board are county-wide, while others are applicable only in the unincorporated areas of the county, where the board has many of the functions of a municipality. The county commissioners are elected by county-wide vote, but each one represents a specific district. The board appoints the county administrator who is responsible to it for the day-to-day operations of the county government.

=== Constitutional officers ===
The elected Constitutional officers are:

- Clerk (Clerk of Courts, County Clerk, etc.)
- Property Appraiser
- Sheriff
- Supervisor of Elections
- Tax Collector

=== School district ===
The independent Martin County School District has a board appointed superintendent of schools and an elected school board, with members listed on the Board Web site. The school board is the legislative body of the district and also exercises quasi-judicial powers. School Board members are elected county-wide but each one represents a specific district.

=== Electoral politics ===
Martin County is a long-standing Republican stronghold; it has not supported a Democratic candidate for the presidency since Franklin D. Roosevelt in 1944.

United States presidential election results for Martin County, Florida
Year	Republican		Democratic		Third party(ies)	
Year	No.	%	No.	%	No.	%
1928	703	58.05%	474	39.14%	34	2.81%
1932	379	31.48%	825	68.52%	0	0.00%
1936	327	29.59%	778	70.41%	0	0.00%
1940	596	36.93%	1,018	63.07%	0	0.00%
1944	530	35.57%	960	64.43%	0	0.00%
1948	948	44.84%	815	38.55%	351	16.60%
1952	2,308	64.65%	1,262	35.35%	0	0.00%
1956	2,997	68.36%	1,387	31.64%	0	0.00%
1960	3,701	58.15%	2,664	41.85%	0	0.00%
1964	4,292	54.24%	3,621	45.76%	0	0.00%
1968	5,179	50.63%	2,580	25.22%	2,471	24.15%
1972	11,296	78.83%	2,946	20.56%	88	0.61%
1976	11,682	56.28%	8,785	42.33%	289	1.39%
1980	20,521	68.05%	8,087	26.82%	1,546	5.13%
1984	28,900	76.28%	8,978	23.70%	9	0.02%
1988	31,279	72.60%	11,488	26.66%	316	0.73%
1992	24,800	46.63%	14,802	27.83%	13,582	25.54%
1996	28,522	52.18%	20,855	38.16%	5,279	9.66%
2000	33,972	54.78%	26,621	42.93%	1,423	2.29%
2004	41,362	57.09%	30,208	41.69%	883	1.22%
2008	44,143	56.22%	33,508	42.67%	871	1.11%
2012	48,183	60.96%	30,107	38.09%	747	0.95%
2016	53,204	61.41%	30,185	34.84%	3,244	3.74%
2020	61,168	61.82%	36,893	37.29%	881	0.89%
2024	64,121	64.90%	33,539	33.95%	1,136	1.15%

=== Voter registration ===
According to the Secretary of State's office, Republicans make up a majority of registered voters in Martin County, followed by unaffiliated voters and Democrats.

Martin County Voter Registration & Party Enrollment as of August 31, 2024
Political Party	Total Voters	Percentage
Republican	61,186	53.11%
No party affiliation	25,107	21.79%
Democratic	24,974	21.68%
Minor parties	3,936	3.42%
Total	115,203	100.00%

== Libraries ==
The Martin County Library System has 6 branches.

- Blake Library (Stuart)
- Elisabeth Lahti Library (Indiantown)
- Hobe Sound Public Library (Hobe Sound)
- Hoke Library (Jensen Beach)
- Peter & Julie Cummings Library (Palm City)
- Robert Morgade Library (a location adjoining Indian River State College)

== Attractions ==
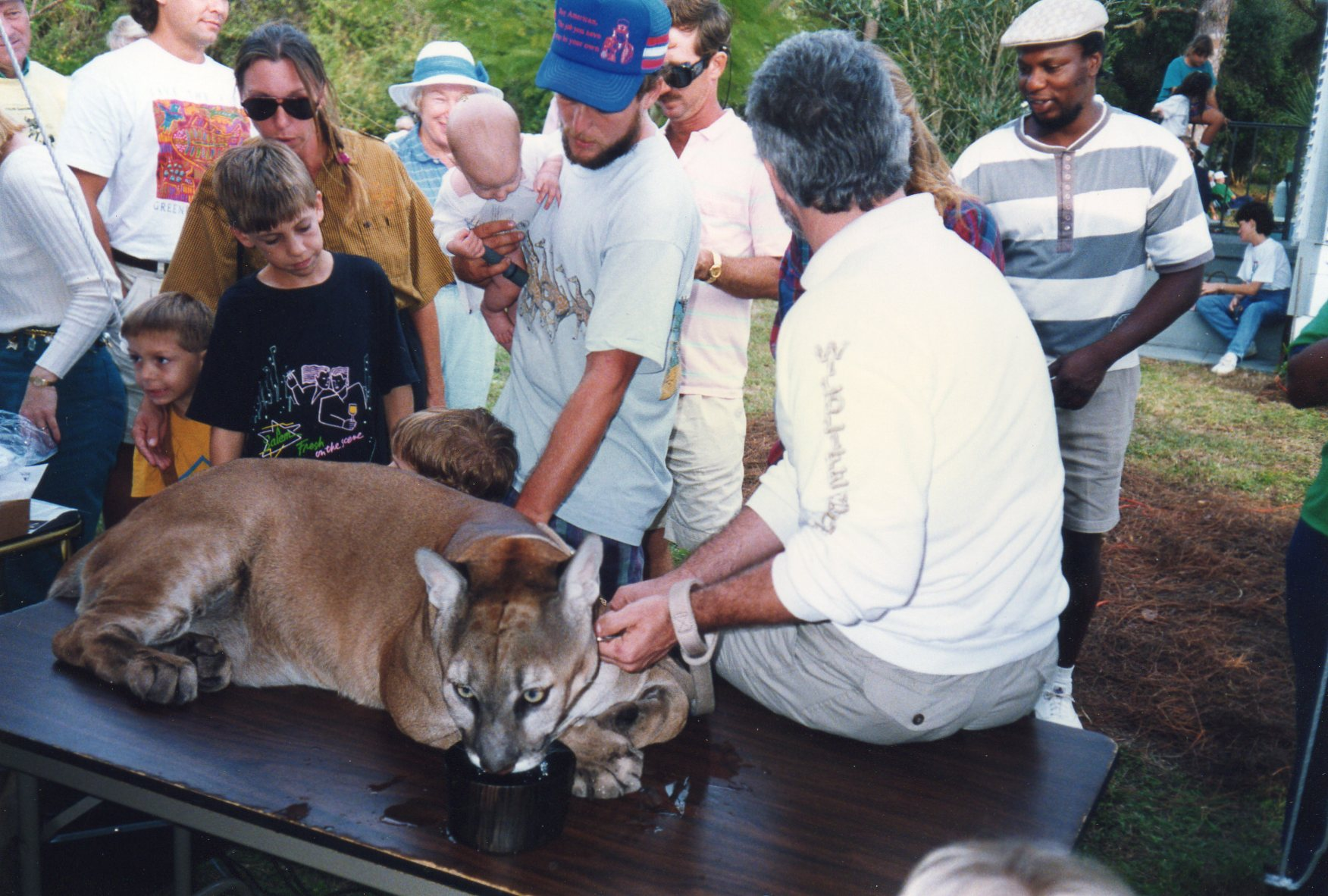
Florida panther at Possum Long, September 1992

- Audubon of Martin County: Possum Long Nature Center, Palm Beach Road, Stuart
- Elliott Museum on Hutchinson Island
- Jonathan Dickinson State Park in South Martin County
- Martin County Fair held every February.
- Martin County Public Beaches:
  - Hobe Sound Public Beach on Jupiter Island
  - Jensen Sea Turtle Beach, Stuart Beach and many beach strips on Hutchinson Island.
- Savannas Preserve State Park (extends into St. Lucie County)
- St. Lucie Inlet Preserve State Park on Long Island east of Port Salerno and north of Jupiter Island

== Historic areas ==
On the National Register of Historic Places:

- Hobe Sound
  - Olympia School, 1925
  - Trapper Nelson Zoo Historic District, located south of Hobe Sound is inside Jonathan Dickinson State Park in southern Martin County, 1933
- Hutchinson Island
  - House of Refuge at Gilbert's Bar, 1876
  - Georges Valentine Shipwreck Site, 1904
- Indiantown
  - Seminole Inn, 1926
- Jensen Beach
  - Mount Elizabeth Archeological Site, prehistoric
  - Stuart Welcome Arch, 1926
  - Tuckahoe, 1938
- Jupiter Island
  - Gate House, 1927
- Stuart
  - Burn Brae Plantation-Krueger House, 1894
  - Lyric Theatre, 1927
  - Old Martin County Courthouse, 1937

Other historic areas listed in 1989 by the Florida Chapter of the American Institute of Architects:

- All Saints Episcopal Church, Waveland, 2377 N.E. Patrician Street, 1898,
- Bay Tree Lodge (Kiplinger House), 143 S. River Road (originally 104 S. Sewall's Point Road), Sewall's Point, 1909
- Dudley-Bessey House, 110 S.W. Atlanta Avenue, Stuart, 1909
- Dyer Homestead, 1006 S.W. St. Lucie Crescent, Stuart, 1904
- Feroe Building, 73 S.W. Flagler Avenue, corner of St. Lucie, Stuart, 1913
- France Apartments, 524 St. Lucie Crescent, Stuart, 1927
- Golden Gate Building, 3225 S.E. Dixie Highway in Golden Gate south of Stuart, 1925
- Kitching House, 210 S.W. Atlanta Avenue, Stuart, 1894
- Stuart Feed Store, 101 S.W. Flagler Avenue, Stuart, 1905
- Sunrise Inn, S.E. Old St. Lucie Boulevard, Port Sewall. ca. 1925 (demolished)
- John E. Taylor House, 204 S.E. Atlanta Avenue, Stuart, 1914

Other places listed in 2012 by the Florida Chapter of the American Institute of Architects in its Florida Architecture: 100 Years. 100 Places.

- Beach Road 2, Jupiter Island

== Communities ==
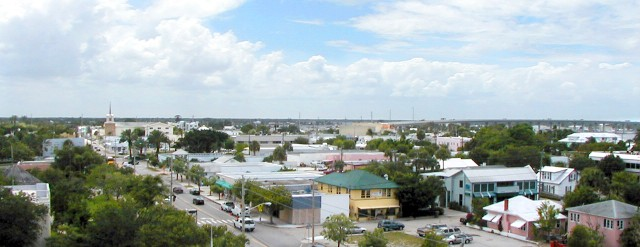
Downtown Stuart, in the heart of the county seat

=== City ===
- Stuart

=== Towns ===
- Jupiter Island
- Ocean Breeze
- Sewall's Point

=== Villages ===
- Indiantown

=== Census-designated places ===
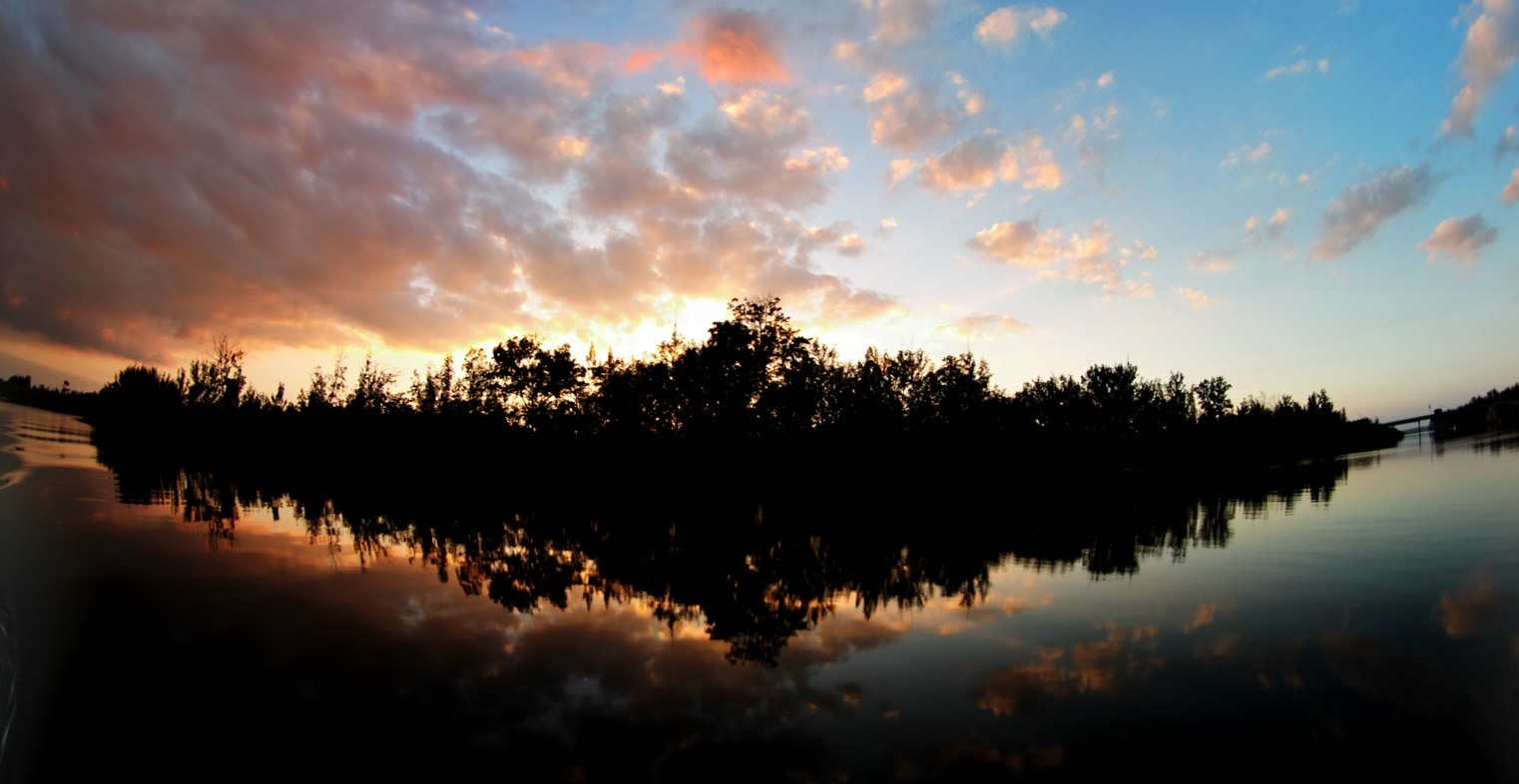
Sunset from the Intracoastal Waterway at Hobe Sound

- Hobe Sound
- Jensen Beach
- North River Shores
- Palm City
- Port Salerno
- Rio

=== Other unincorporated places ===
- Hutchinson Island (part)
- Port Mayaca

== Gallery ==
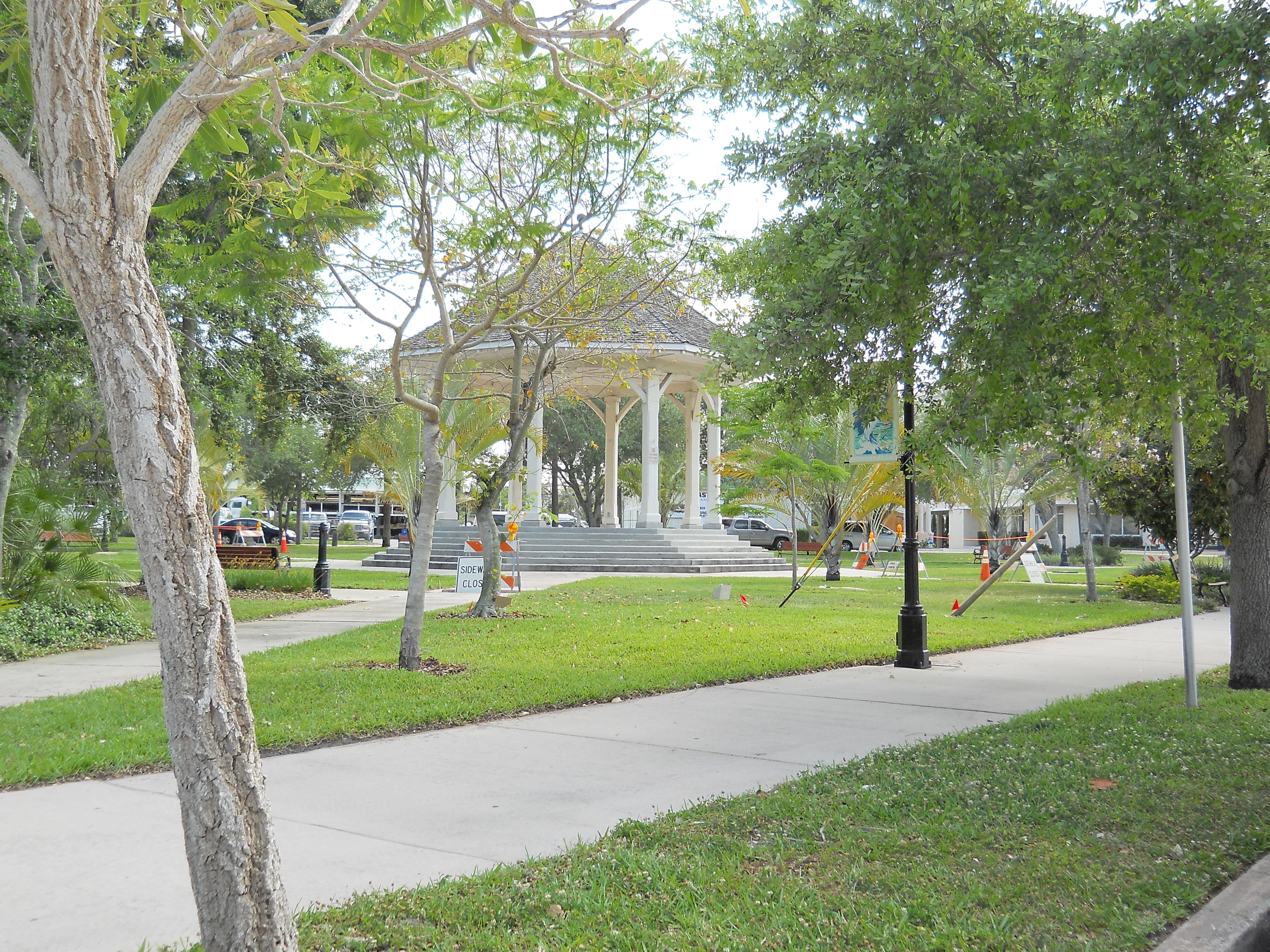
The Gazebo on the grounds of the new courthouse complex

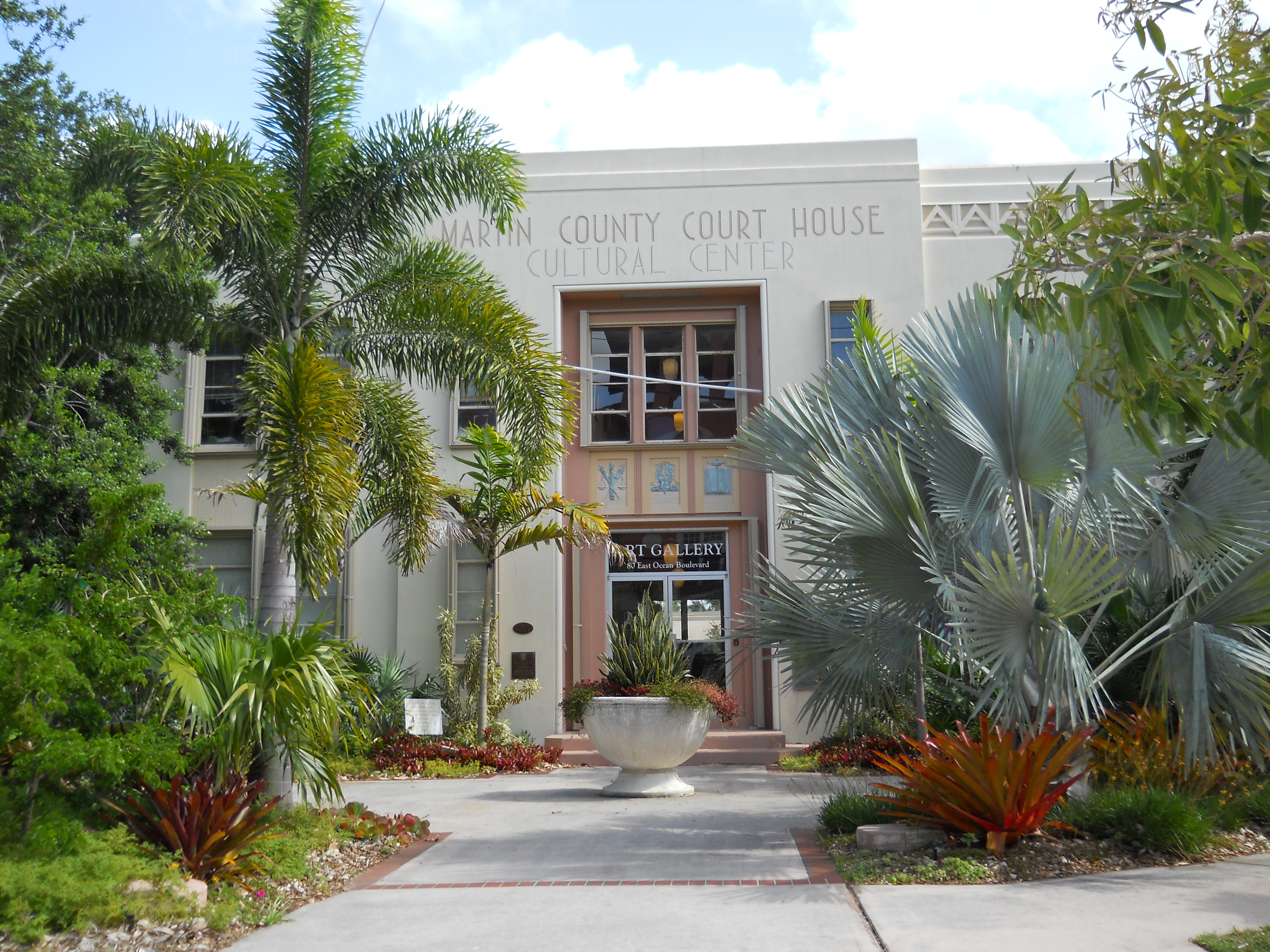
The Old Martin County Courthouse, built in 1937

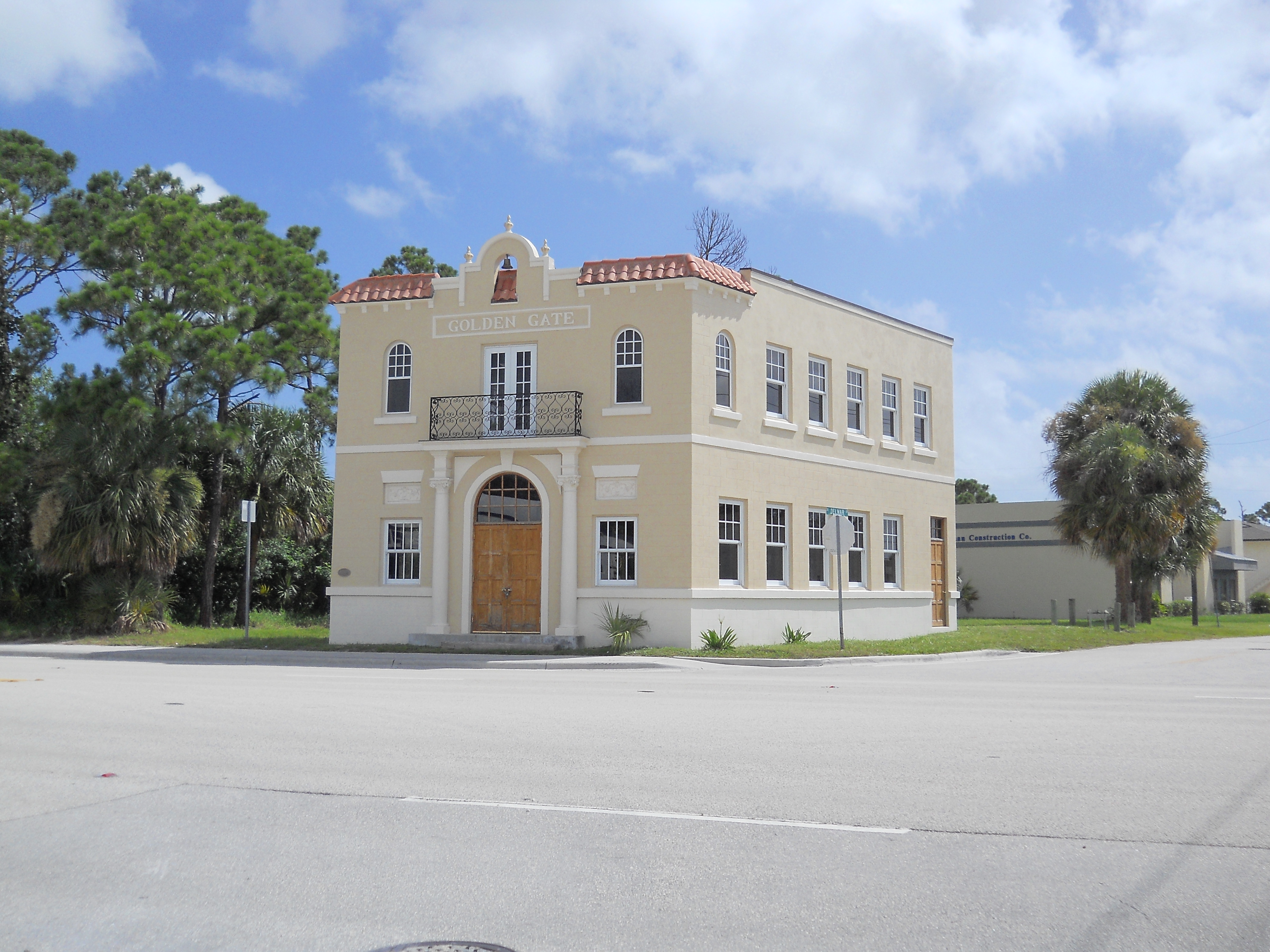
Golden Gate Building, built in 1925

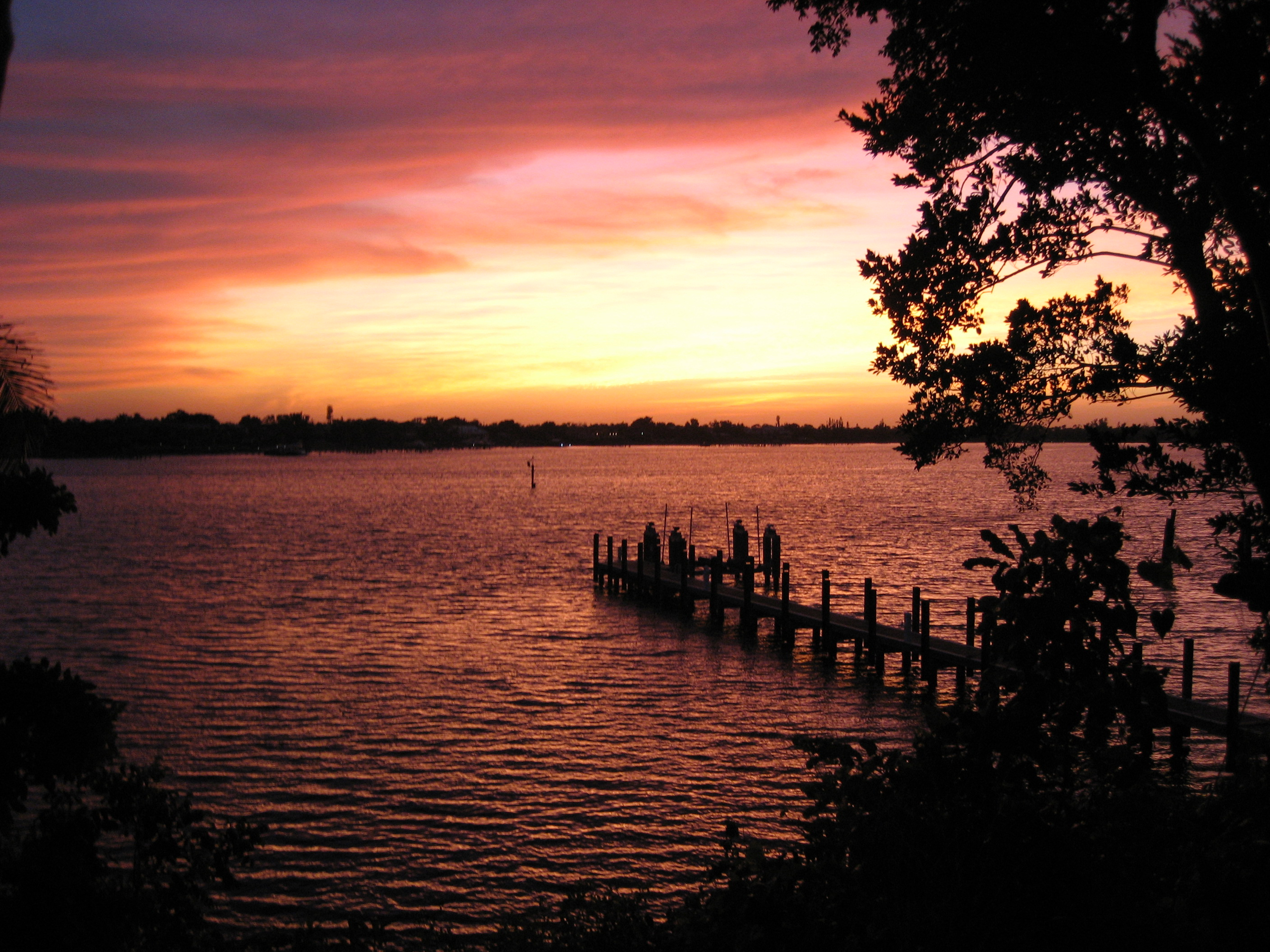
View of St. Lucie River and Stuart from Sewall's Point

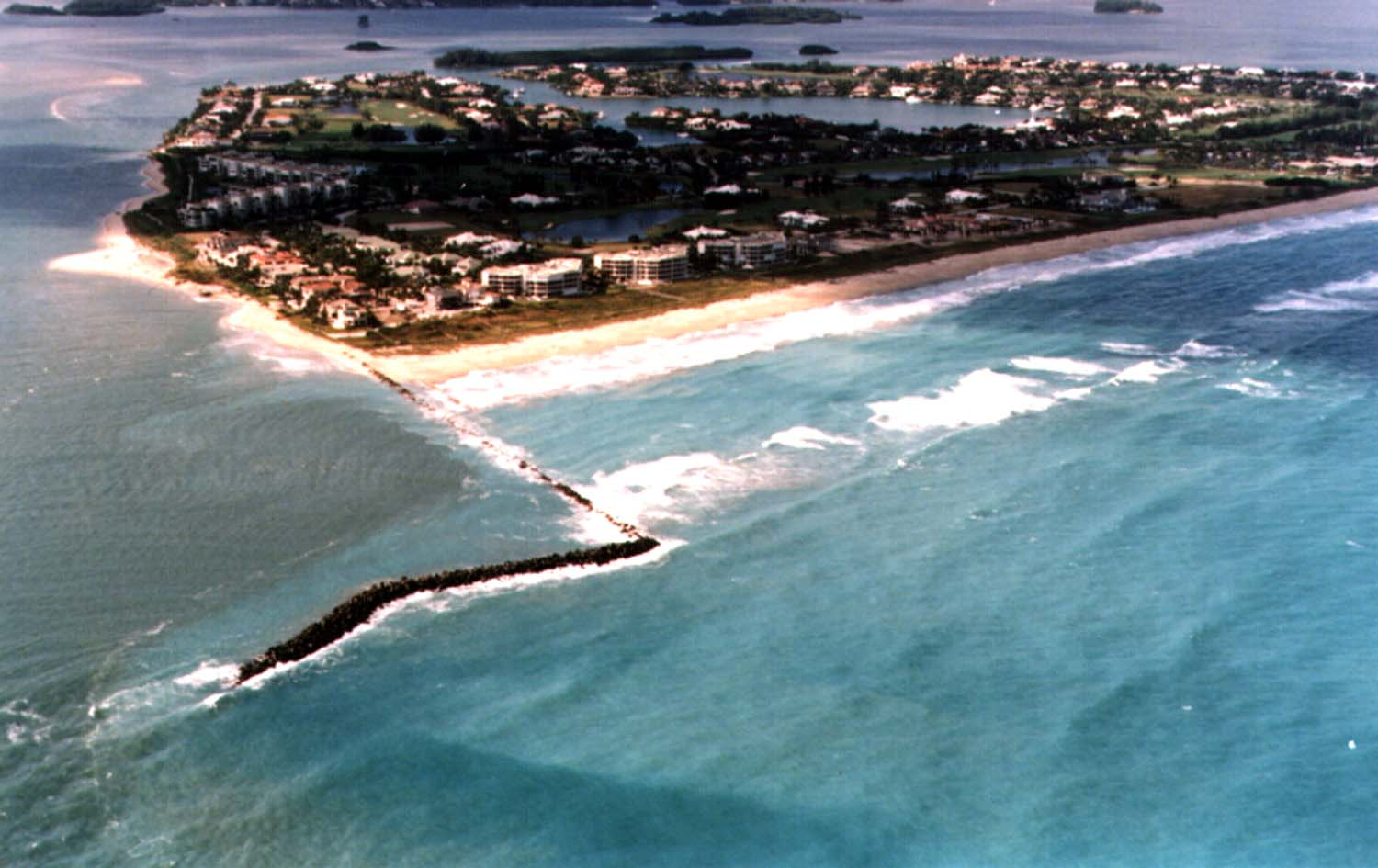
View of St. Lucie Inlet and Sailfish Point

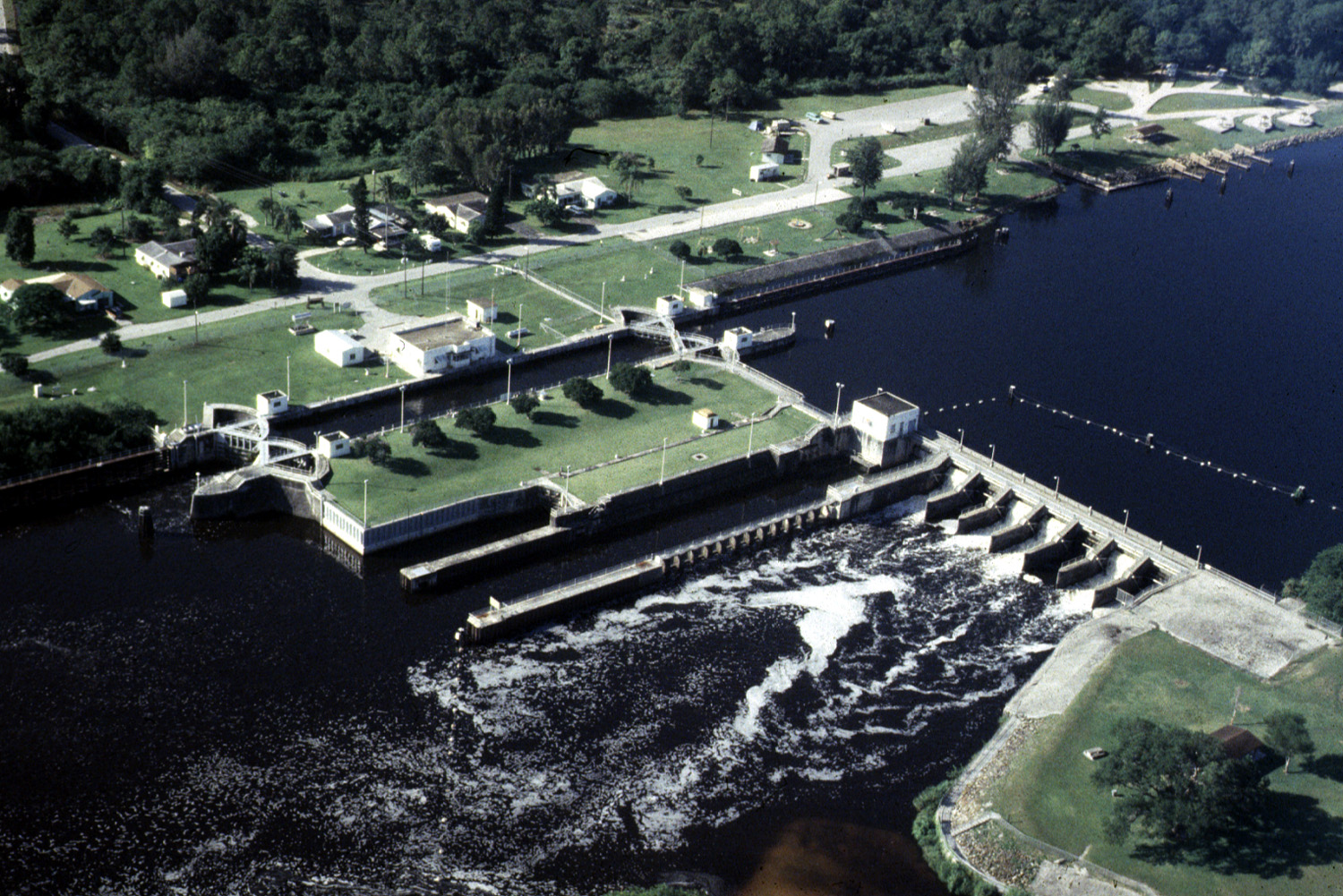
St. Lucie Locks and Dam

== See also ==
- National Register of Historic Places listings in Martin County, Florida
