= Stuart station (Brightline) =

Planned Brightline train station

Stuart

General information
- Location: 500 SE Flagler Avenue; Stuart, Florida; United States
- Coordinates: 27.195945°N 80.250764°W
- Owner: Martin County
- Operator: Brightline
- Line: Florida East Coast Railway
- Platforms: 1 side platform
- Tracks: 1
- Tram routes: Stuart Tram
- Connections: MARTY: 3

Construction
- Structure type: At-grade
- Parking: Paid
- Cycle facilities: Racks
- Accessible: Yes

History
- Opening: 2029

Future services
Preceding station	Brightline	Following station
Orlando Terminus	Brightline	West Palm Beach toward MiamiCentral
Location

Stuart station is a future Brightline inter-city rail station in Stuart, Florida. The station would be located near the Old Martin County Courthouse in the downtown area of the city, with a station size of 10,200 square feet (950 m^{2}) on a 2.35-acre site. Service is proposed to start by 2029.

== History ==
Brightline had originally expressed interest in adding a station on Florida's Treasure Coast, as part of their route between Miami and Orlando. In 2018, Brightline reached a legal settlement with Martin County and residents that a station would be constructed on the Treasure Coast within five years of the completion of the Orlando extension. Later that year, the company asked cities in the area to submit proposals for viable station locations. Fort Pierce, which last had passenger train service on July 31, 1968, had expressed interest.

The City of Stuart had also indicated that it will be negotiating for a potential station. Brightline had originally indicated that Stuart could be the most likely location for a Treasure Coast station. However, neither city's station proposals had been committed in writing as completion of the line to Orlando was the top priority for Brightline. After completing the Orlando extension, Brightline had indicated that their focus was on the Treasure Coast to receive a station, with the company formally launching request for proposals. Stuart and Fort Pierce were the candidates to receive the Brightline station. By February 26, 2024, Stuart city officials confirmed that Brightline had expressed that Stuart would be chosen for the station location. On March 4, 2024, Brightline officially announced that Stuart had won the bid for the Treasure Coast station. In the months to follow, however, financial concerns began to arise, with some residents mentioning that the station would be too costly for taxpayers of the City of Stuart. On September 9, 2024, Stuart commissioners voted 3-2 to rescind agreements with Brightline for the station. The following day, Martin County commissioners unanimously voted to renegotiate the deal between Brightline and the City of Stuart for the potential station. On November 12, 2024, Martin County commissioners unanimously voted to move forward with the station and fund up to $15 million. The county then submitted a request for a $45 million Federal-State Partnership for Intercity Passenger Rail (FSP) grant from the Federal Railroad Administration (FRA) by a December 17, 2024 deadline, with the total cost of the project originally expected to be $60 million.

The FRA later announced on September 22, 2025, that funding under the FSP would be reissued as the National Railroad Partnership Program, having an application deadline of February 6, 2026. The county resubmitted its request, now for $69.2 million, based on the new data requested by the FRA. The FRA did not approve the request, leaving the future of the station in doubt.

The Stuart station is planned to be an infill station along the Florida route. Martin County, along with the anticipated FSP grant from the FRA, would fund constructing the station and its platform, a surface parking lot that would accommodate Brightline passengers, improvements to rail infrastructure, and access and zoning requirements and costs. The total project cost is estimated to be $87 million, and the county will contribute up to $15 million, as well as the station site valued at $2.8 million, while the FSP grant could fund up to $69.2 million. Construction of the station could begin in the coming years, with service planned for 2029.
