= Feroe Building =

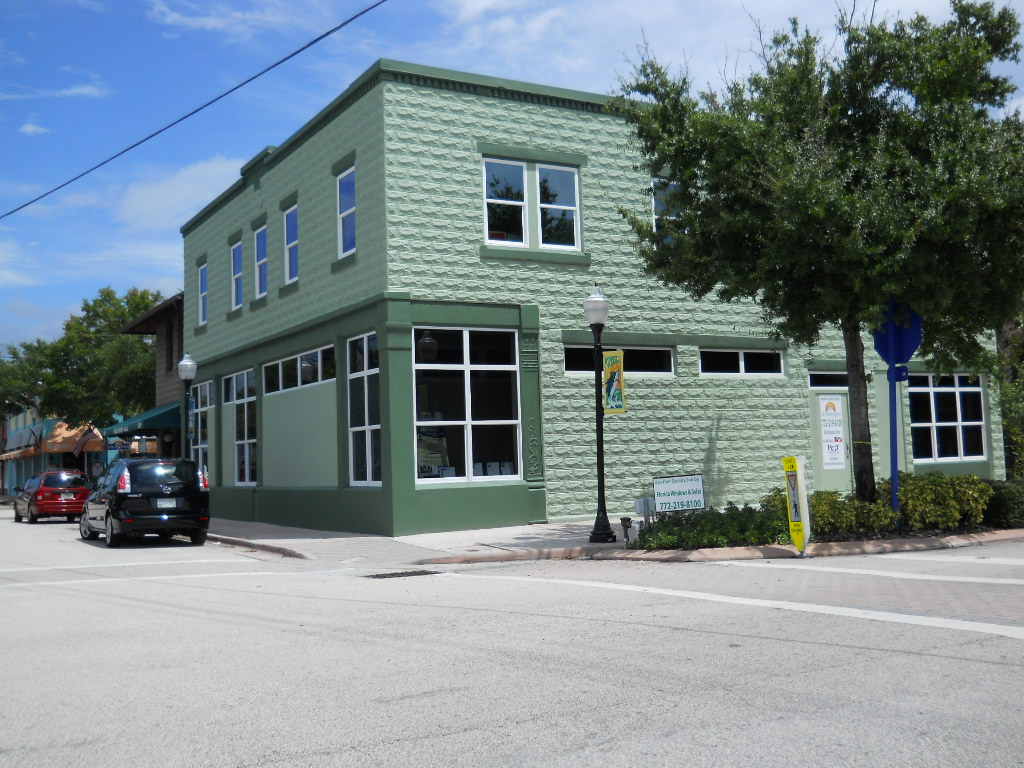
- Feroe Building in 2010

General information
- Location: 73 S.W. Flagler Ave. Stuart, Florida, United States
- Completed: 1913
- Client: Harry C. Feroe

Design and construction
- Architect: builder: Sam Matthews

The Feroe Building, also known as the Harry C. Feroe Building, is an historic two-story commercial building located at 73 S.W. Flagler Avenue, corner of S.W. St. Lucie Avenue in Stuart, Martin County, Florida. To its north of along Flagler Avenue is Fellowship Hall built in 1912 as the Bank of Stuart, while to the east along Flagler Avenue is the Lyric Theatre built in 1925 and later expanded. Built and named for Harry C. Feroe, who was associated with Charles C. Chillingworth in the development of Palm City, it was built in 1913 by local contractor Sam Matthews using locally manufactured concrete blocks which had been cast by Frank Frazier to look like stones. The ground floor, which fronted on St. Lucie Avenue and featured cast-iron columns, was designed for retail use, while the second floor, which was accessed by stairs from an entrance on the Flagler Avenue side of the building, was designed for office space. Later in 1913 the Florida East Coast Railway built its now demolished Stuart Depot directly across Flagler Avenue from the building, which enhanced its value. Early ground floor tenants were the Stuart post office in the corner space and the Stuart Drug Company to its north. After the post office moved out, its space was occupied by various other businesses until eventually being combined with the drug store space. Marilyn's Pharmacy, a Rexall agency, occupied the space in the 1960s and early 1970s. In the middle 1980s local lawyer Larry M. Stewart bought the building and renovated it for his law offices. The main entrance was moved to the east side of the building with access from a courtyard which is entered from Flagler Avenue through an arched wrought-iron gate. In 2020, the building was purchased and occupied by one of the premier law firms in Stuart, Kibbey Wagner, PLLC. They renovated and updated the building’s exterior and interior.

In 1989, the Feroe Building was listed in A Guide to Florida's Historic Architecture, published by the University of Florida Press.

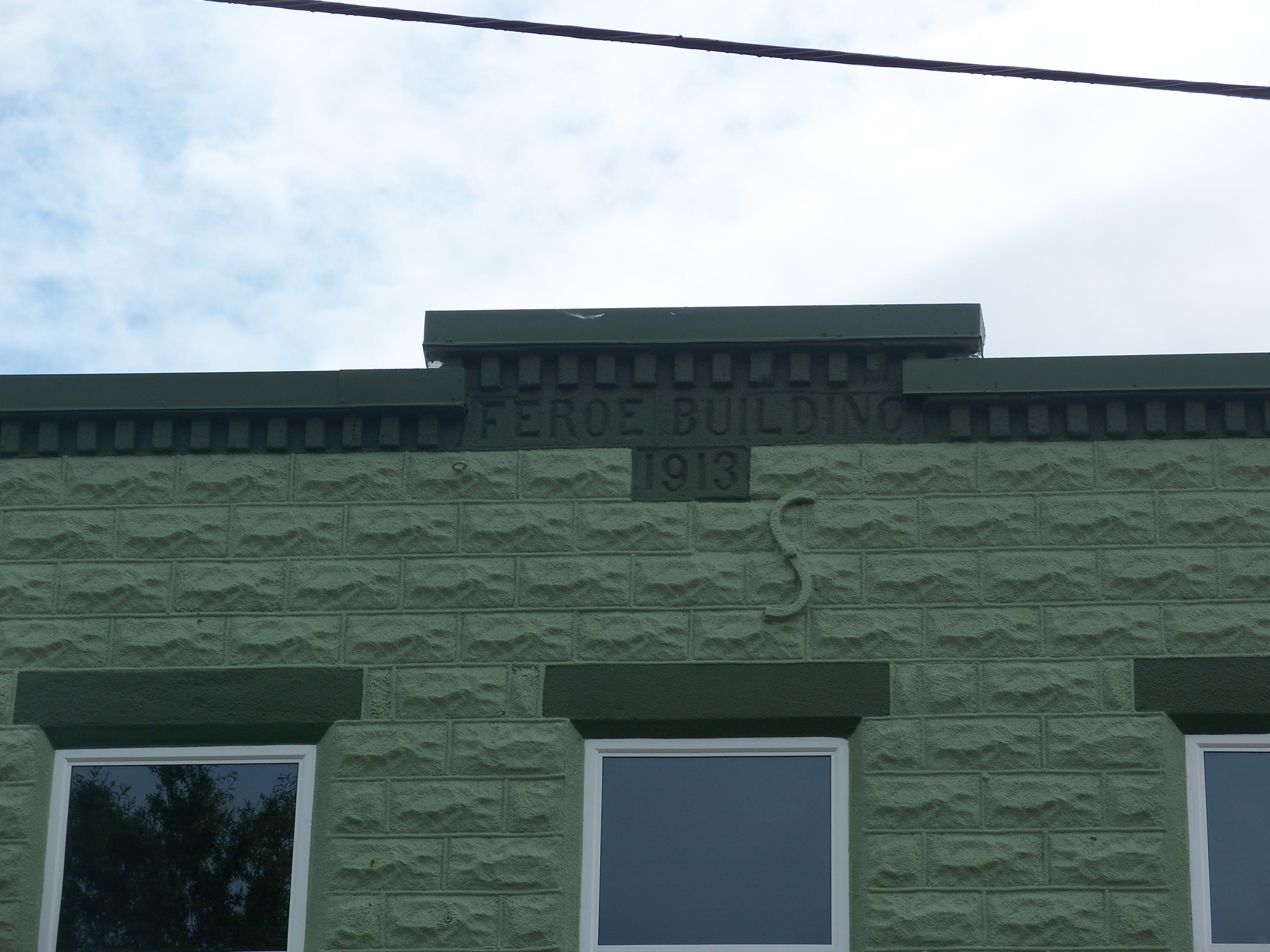
Detail of upper west facade

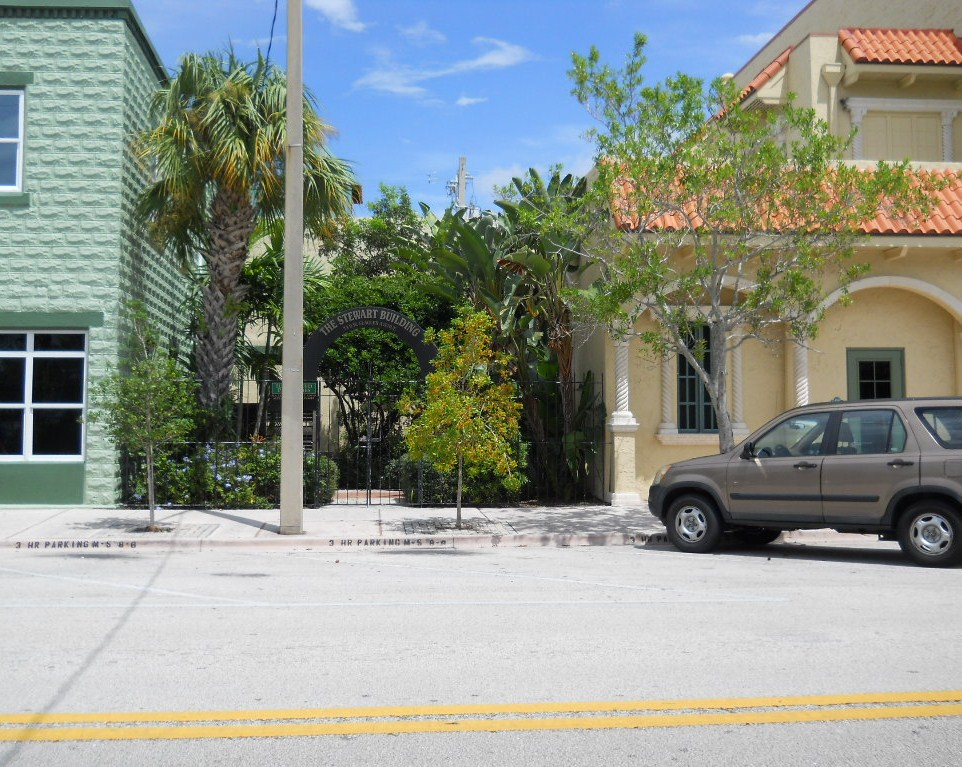
Entrance in 2010. Lyric Theatre is to the right
