= Port Salerno, Florida =

- Town
- Location in Martin County and the state of Florida
- Coordinates: 27°07′55″N 80°11′28″W
- Country: United States
- State: Florida
- County: Martin

Area
  - Total: 4.07 sq mi (10.54 km^{2})
  - Land: 3.56 sq mi (9.23 km^{2})
  - Water: 0.51 sq mi (1.31 km^{2})
- Elevation: 10 ft (3.0 m)

Population (2020)
  - Total: 10,401
  - Density: 2,917.1/sq mi (1,126.29/km^{2})
- Time zone: UTC-5
  - Summer (DST): UTC-4
- ZIP codes: 34992; 34997 (Stuart)
- Area code: 772
- FIPS code: 12-58727
- GNIS feature ID: 2403441

Port Salerno is a town in Martin County, Florida, United States. The population was 10,401 at the 2020 census. It is part of the Port St. Lucie Metropolitan Statistical Area.

== Geography ==
Port Salerno is located in eastern Martin County and is bordered to the north by the St. Lucie River and Indian River Lagoon, to the east by one of its branches, known as Great Pocket, to the northwest by Manatee Pocket, and to the southwest by U.S. Route 1. It is 5 miles (8 km) southeast of Stuart, the county seat, and 8 miles (13 km) northwest of Hobe Sound.

According to the United States Census Bureau, the Port Salerno CDP has a total area of 4.1 square miles (11 km^{2}), of which 3.6 square miles (9.3 km^{2}) are land and 0.5 square miles (1.3 km^{2}), or 12.38%, are water.

== History ==
In the 1920s, a small settlement was created in the southern shores of St. Lucie river inlet. It was named "Salerno" because of its visual resemblance to the Italian city of Salerno as observed by an early visitor. Early settlers were fisherman who lived along the banks of the Manatee Pocket, a small natural bay in the St. Lucie River. Some descendants of these original settlers remain in the area, with some families owning land for over 100 years.

The area increased in population and importance after World War II, with many people from the northeastern United States moving to Florida. In 1960, the name was changed to "Port Salerno", in order to differentiate it from that of the Italian city.

The 1967 film Gentle Giant was partially filmed in and around Port Salerno. The only grocery store in town was P.O. Smith's Grocery, which was housed in a small wooden building at the intersection of Snake Road (later renamed Salerno Road) and Route A1A. This grocery store was featured in the production in Palm Beach Gardens, but had been transformed into a saloon before being filmed. This was because the grocery store had swinging "saloon style" doors.

In the 1970s, the Manatee Hotel was transformed into the Manatee Resort upon purchase by Michael Reynolds, heir to the R. J. Reynolds tobacco fortune. Sally Field mentioned the town and resort in an interview with Johnny Carson on The Tonight Show.

In the 1980s, the Chastain Campus of Indian River State College was established. Port Salerno is known for their "World Fishing Tournaments", based on the yacht port.

On October 9, 2024, Port Salerno was hit by two tornadoes which were spawned by Hurricane Milton. The first tornado was an EF1, and the second tornado was an EF2. Both tornadoes caused damage in the community and struck within two hours of each other.

== Government ==
Port Salerno is an unincorporated town located in Martin County, governed by County Commissioners. Martin County is divided into five districts. Port Salerno is represented by Sarah Heard as part of District 4.

== Public transportation ==
Martin County Public Transit (MARTY) provides fixed-route bus service through Port Salerno.

== Demographics ==
Historical population
Census	Pop.	Note	%±
1980	4,511		—
1990	7,786		72.6%
2000	10,141		30.2%
2010	10,091		−0.5%
2020	10,401		3.1%
U.S. Decennial Census

=== 2020 census ===
Port Salerno racial composition (Hispanics excluded from racial categories) (NH = Non-Hispanic)
Race	Number	Percentage
White (NH)	7,018	67.47%
Black or African American (NH)	725	6.97%
Native American or Alaska Native (NH)	20	0.19%
Asian (NH)	67	0.64%
Some Other Race (NH)	30	0.29%
Mixed/Multi-Racial (NH)	347	3.34%
Hispanic or Latino	2,194	21.09%
Total	10,401	

As of the 2020 census, Port Salerno had a population of 10,401. There were 4,609 households and 2,723 families residing in the CDP.

The median age was 52.0 years. 16.7% of residents were under the age of 18 and 29.1% of residents were 65 years of age or older. For every 100 females there were 98.0 males, and for every 100 females age 18 and over there were 96.2 males age 18 and over.

All residents lived in urban areas, while 0.0% lived in rural areas.

There were 5,432 housing units, of which 15.2% were vacant. The homeowner vacancy rate was 2.3% and the rental vacancy rate was 6.6%. Of the 4,609 households, 20.0% had children under the age of 18 living in them; 44.6% were married-couple households, 20.8% were households with a male householder and no spouse or partner present, and 27.1% were households with a female householder and no spouse or partner present. About 32.8% of all households were made up of individuals and 18.5% had someone living alone who was 65 years of age or older.

== Notable person ==
- BossMan Dlow, rapper

=== 2000 census ===
As of the census of 2000, there were 10,141 people, 4,466 households, and 2,862 families residing in the CDP. The population density was 2,803.2 inhabitants per square mile (1,082.3/km^{2}). There were 5,126 housing units at an average density of 1,416.9 per square mile (547.1/km^{2}).

The racial makeup of the CDP was 88.50% White, 6.95% African American, 0.14% Native American, 0.68% Asian, 0.12% Pacific Islander, 2.27% from other races, and 1.34% from two or more races. Hispanic or Latino of any race were 8.16% of the population.

There were 4,466 households, out of which 23.2% had children under the age of 18 living with them, 50.9% were married couples living together, 9.3% had a female householder with no husband present, and 35.9% were non-families. 28.9% of all households were made up of individuals, and 13.9% had someone living alone who was 65 years of age or older. The average household size was 2.25 and the average family size was 2.73.

In the CDP, the population was spread out, with 19.9% under the age of 18, 6.1% from 18 to 24, 24.7% from 25 to 44, 24.6% from 45 to 64, and 24.7% who were 65 years of age or older. The median age was 44 years. For every 100 females, there were 92.8 males. For every 100 females age 18 and over, there were 91.7 males.

The median income for a household in the CDP was $39,839, and the median income for a family was $45,016. Males had a median income of $32,420 versus $25,371 for females. The per capita income for the CDP was $24,948. About 7.0% of families and 9.6% of the population were below the poverty line, including 15.9% of those under age 18 and 6.8% of those age 65 or over.
