= Dudley-Bessey House =

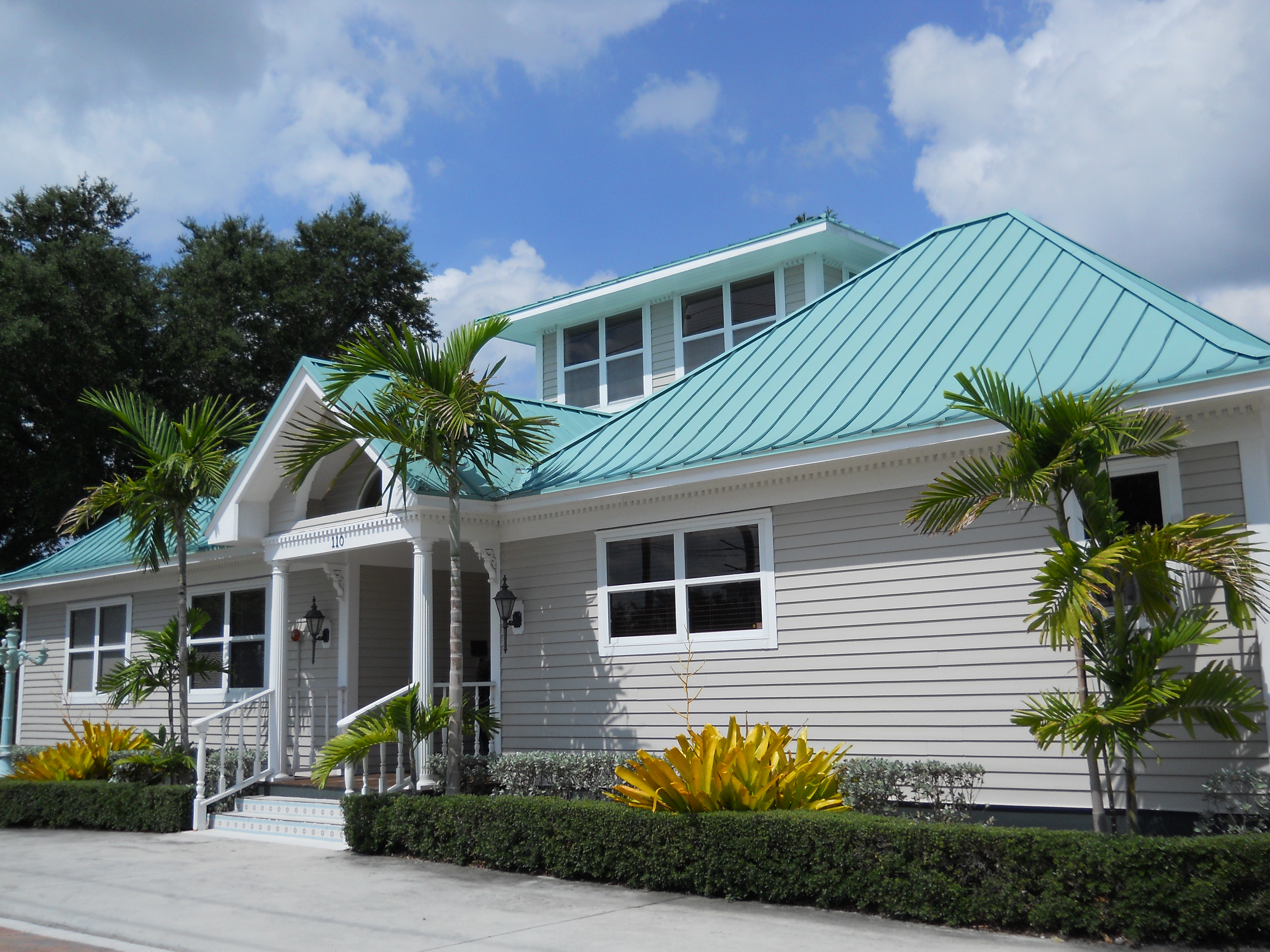
- Dudley-Bessey House, July 2010
- Interactive map of the Dudley-Bessey House area

General information
- Architectural style: Colonial Revival
- Location: 110 SW Atlanta Ave., Stuart, Florida, United States
- Coordinates: 27.199498°N 80.257931°W
- Completed: 1909
- Client: Phillip B. H. Dudley

Technical details
- Structural system: wooden frame

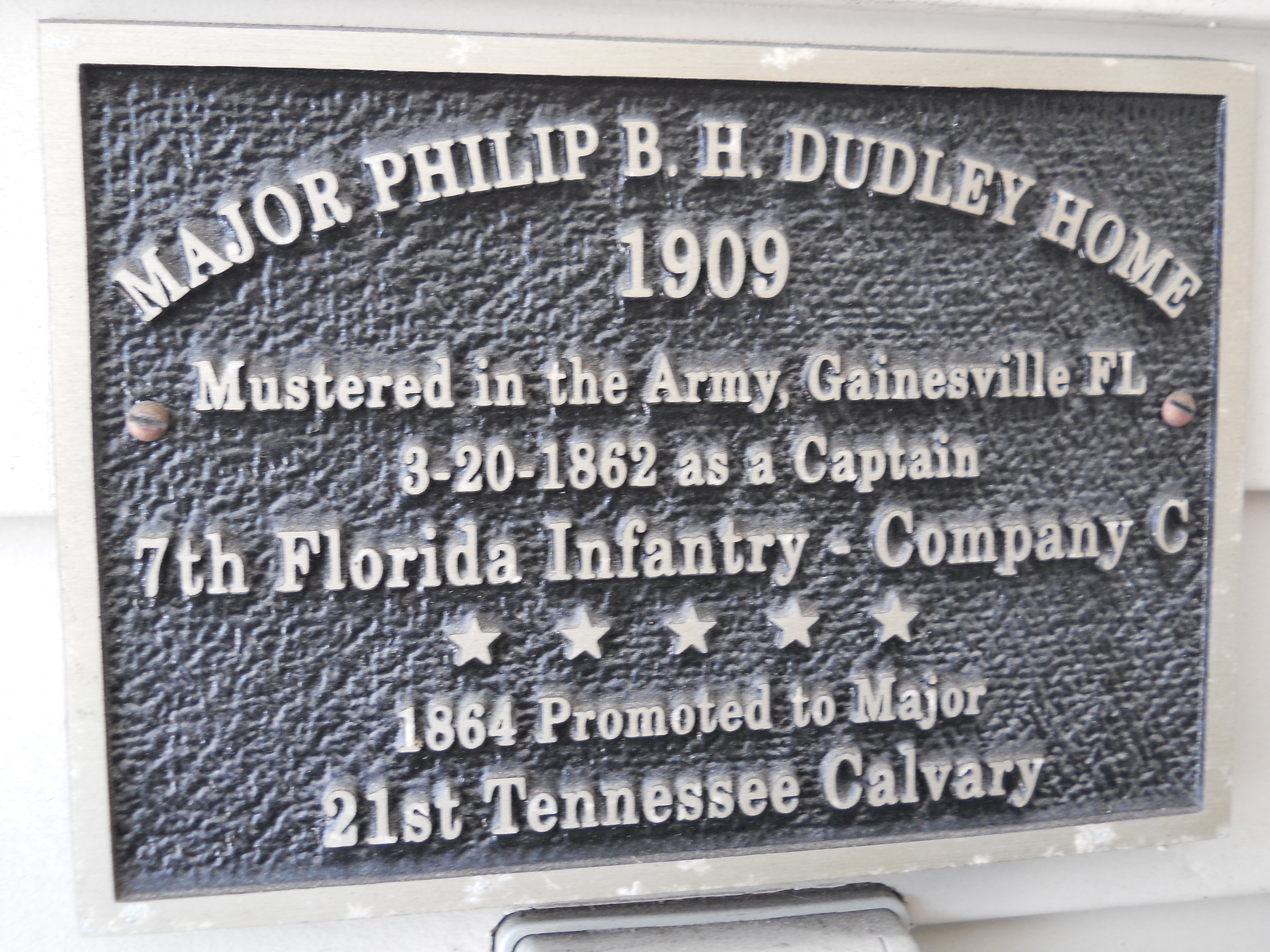
Plaque on entrance from street

The Dudley-Bessey House, also known as the Major Phillip B. H. Dudley Home, is an historic two-story, single-family house located at 110 SW Atlanta Avenue in Stuart in Martin County, Florida. Built in 1909 for Phillip B. H. Dudley, it features a first floor central hallway which runs from the street-side entrance straight through to the main entrance which faces the Halpatiokee River, now known as the South Fork of the St. Lucie River. All interior rooms open from this hallway. It later became home of Hubert W. Bessey, 1855–1918, one of the founders of Stuart, Sometime before 1989 the street side was altered by the addition of a long porch with a flat roof and a sloped roof over the entryway. Today most of the front porch has been enclosed and incorporated into the building, leaving only a sheltered entryway with a grander sloped roof over the entry way and hip roofs over the each side of the former porch. The interior has been restored and the building became the offices of United Yacht Sales.

In 1989, the Dudley-Bessey House was listed in A Guide to Florida's Historic Architecture, published by the University of Florida Press.
