= Beach Road 2 =

General information
- Architectural style: Modern
- Location: Jupiter Island, Florida, United States
- Construction started: May 2004
- Completed: Nov. 2005
- Client: Private

Technical details
- Size: 3,600 sq.ft.

Design and construction
- Architects: Scott Hughes of Hughes Umbanhowar; builder, Benchmark Homes

Beach Road 2 is a two-story Atlantic beach house built between 2004 and 2005 on the foundation of a previous house in the North Beach Road area of Jupiter Island, Florida. Designed in the modernistic style by Hobe Sound architect Scott Hughes of Hughes Umbanhowar and built by Benchmark Homes, it features an exterior of glass, wood, stucco and aluminum. On April 18, 2012, the American Institute of Architects's Florida Chapter added Beach Road 2 to its list of Florida Architecture: 100 Years. 100 Places. It was ranked fourth by the architects voting in Florida Architecture: 100 Years. 100 Places.
