= Golden Gate Building =

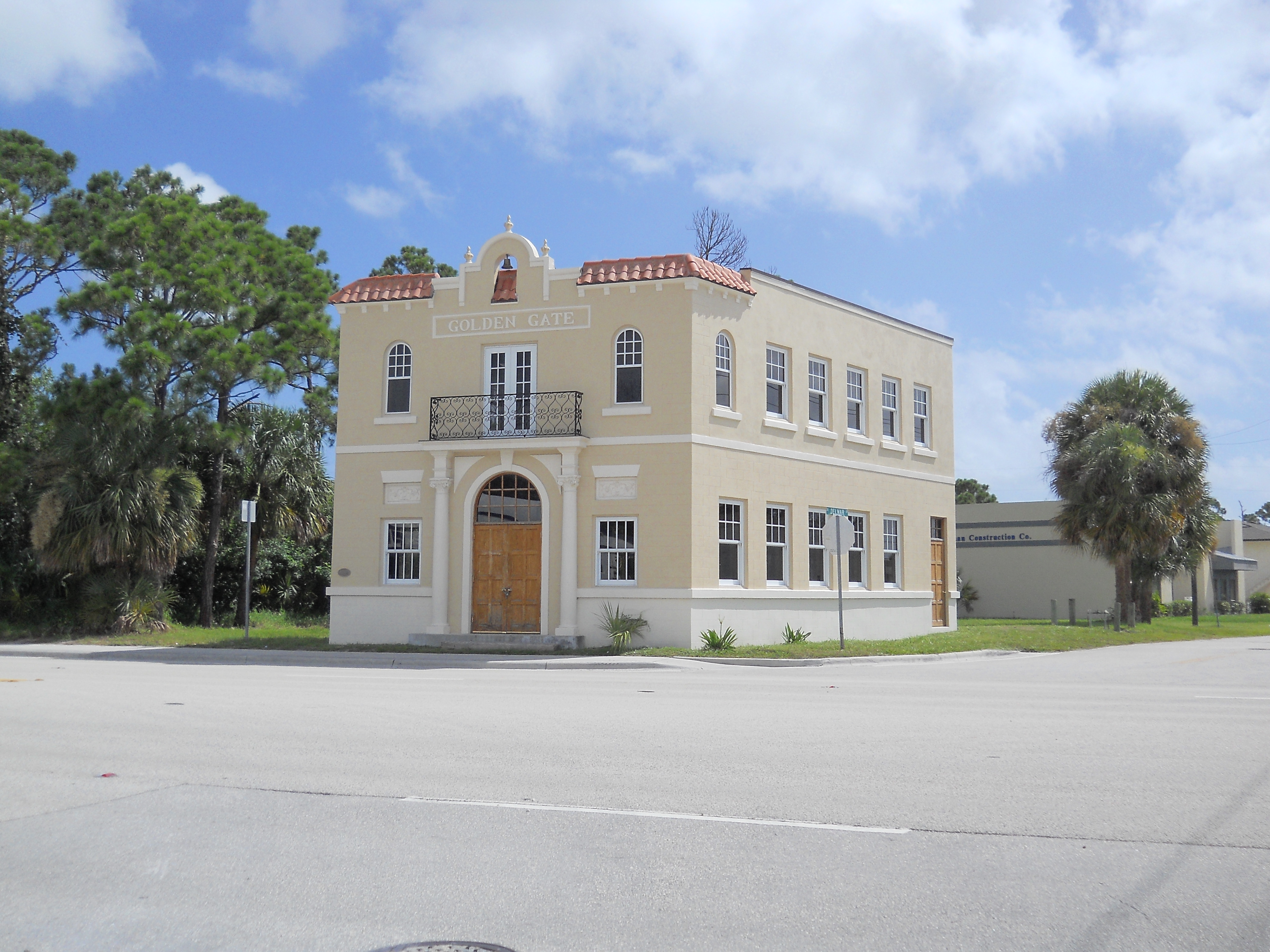
- Golden Gate Building in 2010 after being renovated
- Interactive map of the Golden Gate Building area

General information
- Architectural style: Mediterranean Revival
- Location: Stuart, Florida, United States
- Coordinates: 27.16548°N 80.21899°W
- Completed: 1925
- Client: Golden Gate Development Company
- Owner: Local Government: Martin County, Florida

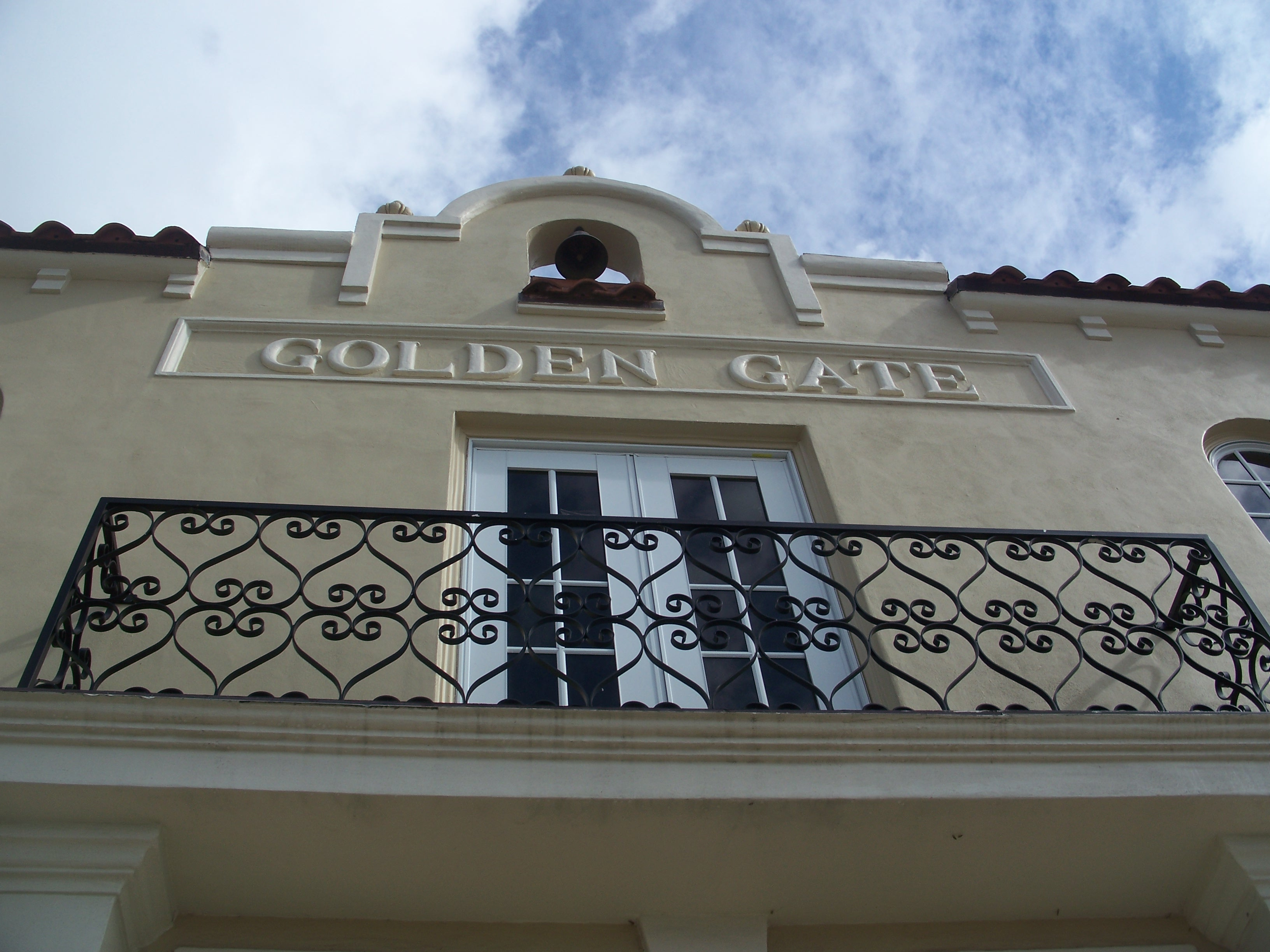

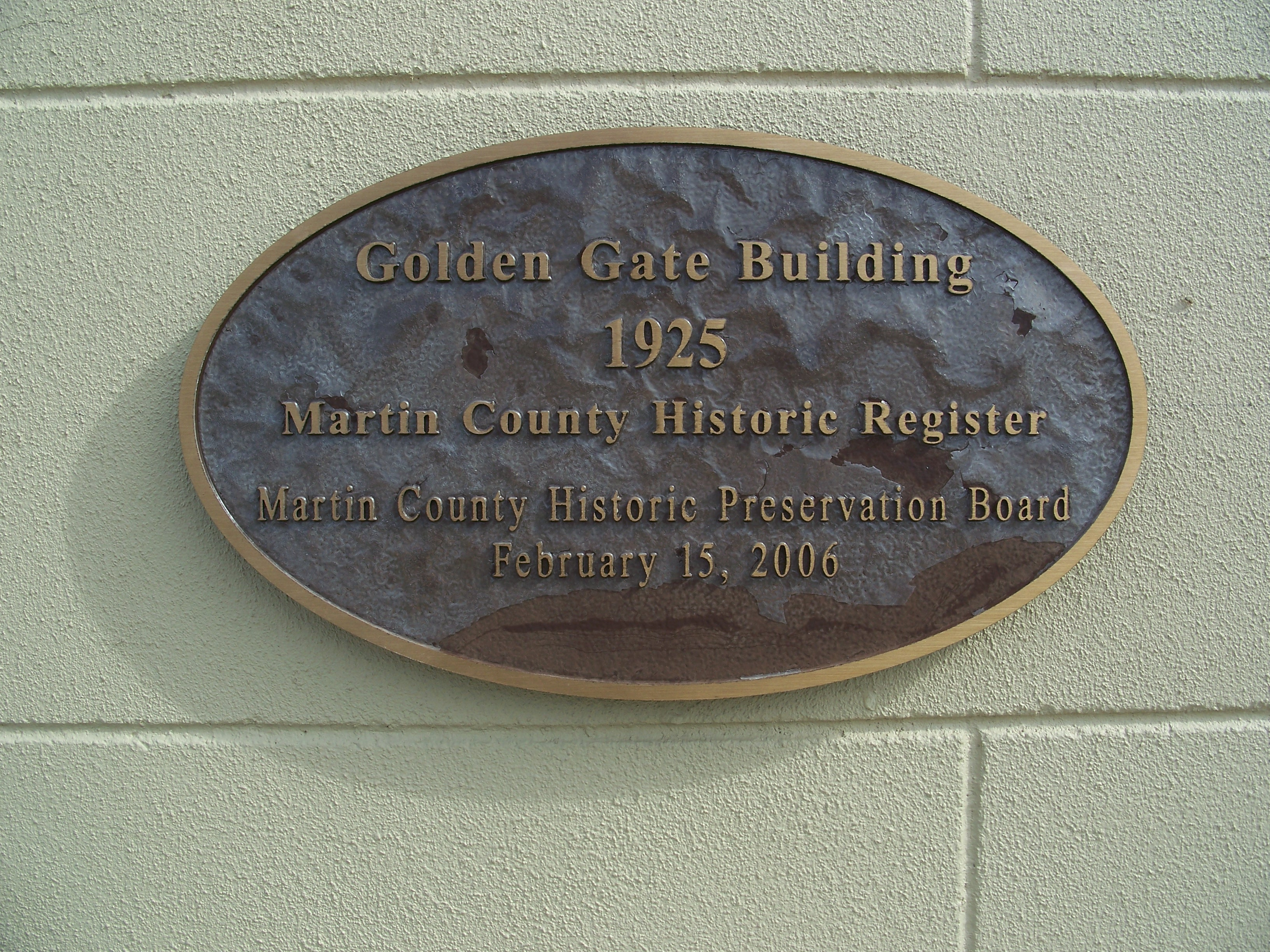

The Golden Gate Building, built in 1925, is an historic real estate and land development office building located on State Road A1A at 3225 South East Dixie Highway (corner of South East Delmar Street) in the unincorporated community of Golden Gate south of Stuart in Martin County, Florida. It was built by the Golden Gate Development Company to serve as the sales office for its 200 block subdivision called Golden Gate. which was a re-subdivision of a part of the 1911 subdivision called Port Sewall. The Florida Land Boom, however, collapsed before it could be used as such. In 1926, it became the Port Sewall Post Office and it was later used as a church and then as an art studio, before being abandoned and falling into disrepair.

In 1989, the Golden Gate Building was listed in A Guide to Florida's Historic Architecture, published by the University of Florida Press.

In 2002, the Board of County Commissioners of Martin County bought it in order to prevent its destruction. Renovations which began in 2005 were directed first to shoring up the four walls which were in serious danger of collapse. Exterior renovations were completed in 2008 with a $48,000 grant from the state and it is anticipated that the interior will be restored by 2010. The Friends of the Historic Golden Gate Community spearhead the renovation efforts. Plans called for the 2-story 2,200-square-foot (200 m^{2}) building to be increased to 4,000 square feet (370 m^{2}) with the new space to be used to provide amenities such as the bathrooms necessary for a public community center.

The building was listed on the National Register of Historic Places in 2017.

In 2017, a collaboration of non-profit agencies and funding partners throughout Martin County completed the renovation to the historic building, opening it to the public as the Golden Gate Center for Enrichment. The two-story community center features a library outpost and computer lab on the first floor with classroom space suited for diverse teaching layouts and uses. Martin County-based human services agency, House of Hope, manages the building and all of its operations, while program partners provide the community with workshops, classes, access to technology, and information sessions designed to enhance life skills, earning potential, health and overall well-being at no cost to participants. The exterior lot has been transformed into a nutrition garden maintained by House of Hope staff and volunteers which is accessed frequently as part of the "Gardening for Healthy Families" curriculum offered weekly to the community.
