= Lyric Theatre (Stuart, Florida) =

- U.S. National Register of Historic Places
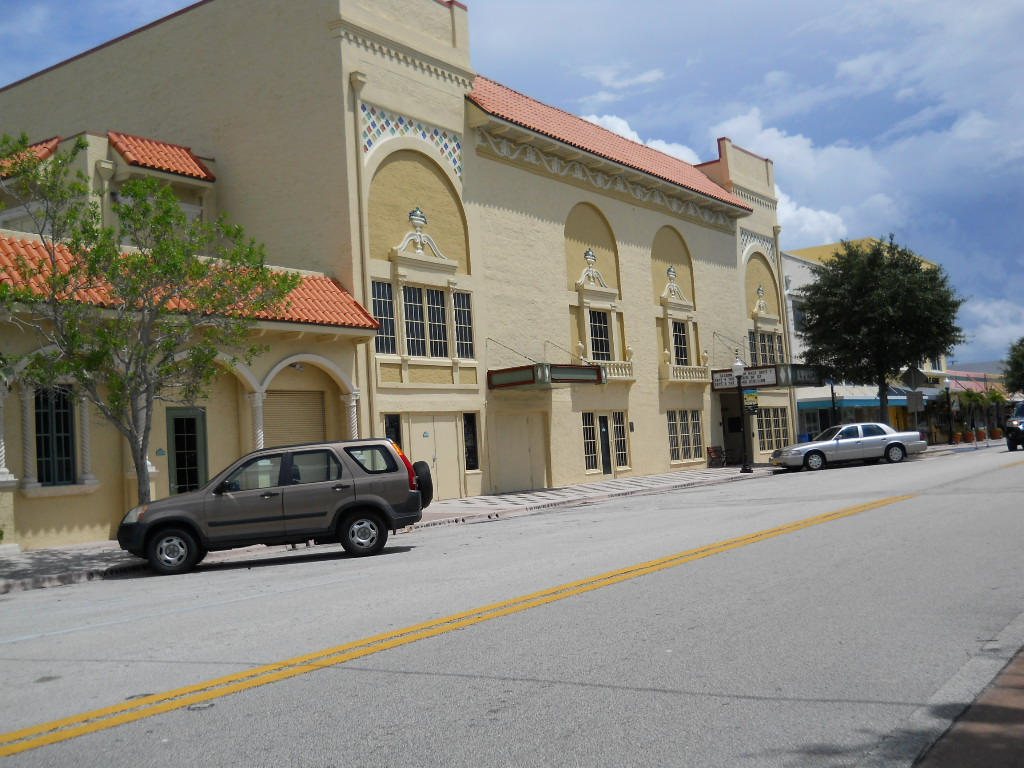
- Lyric Theatre, south (front) elevation on SW Flagler Ave

- Location within Florida Location within the United States
- Location: 59 SW Flagler Ave. Stuart, Florida
- Coordinates: 27°11′56″N 80°15′17″W
- Built: 1926
- Architect: Sherwood, John; Casto, Mark
- Architectural style: Beaux Arts, Mission/Spanish Revival
- NRHP reference No.: 93001204
- Added to NRHP: November 12, 1993

The Lyric Theatre is a historic theater located at 59 Southwest Flagler Avenue in downtown Stuart, Florida. The building fronts on its north side on Southwest Osceola Street. Built in 1926 to serve as a movie house, the Lyrics Theatre contains elements of the Beaux Arts and Mission/Spanish Revival-styles of architecture. Most notably, Katharine Hepburn performed during an annual Kiwanis Minstrel show at the theatre in 1941.

On November 12, 1993, the Lyric Theatre added to the U.S. National Register of Historic Places. Currently, the building is used primarily as a stage and music venue, while at times also hosting churches. Additions were made on the west side to provide back stage space for these new uses. The additions also face on both streets.

== History and description ==
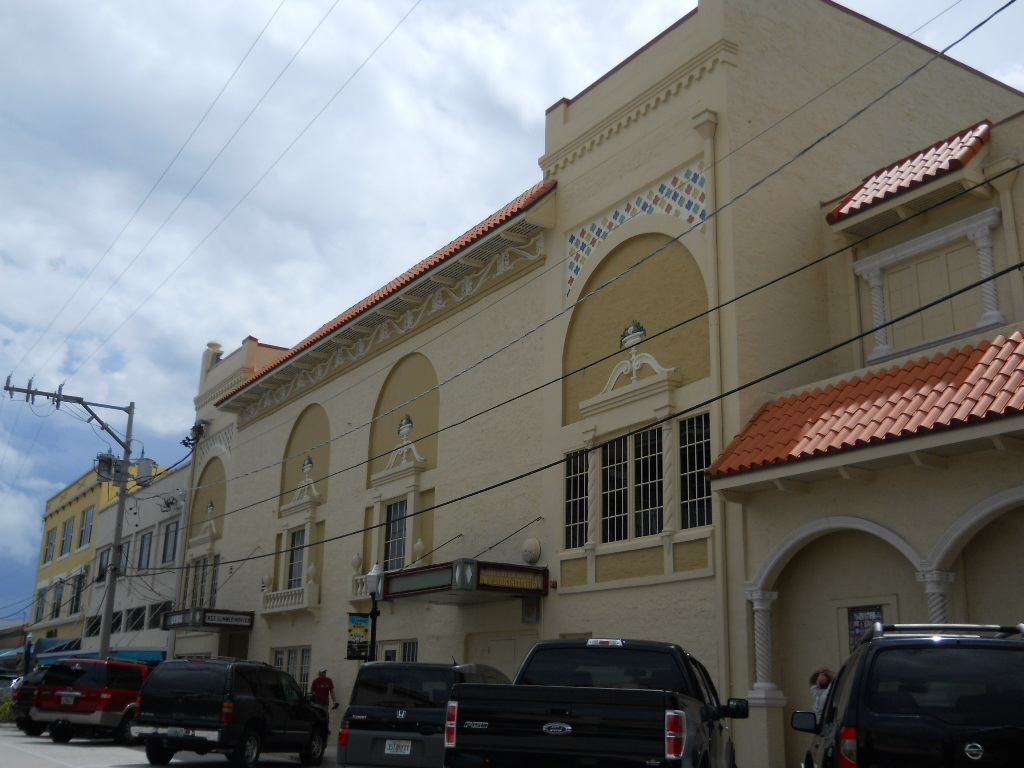
Lyric Theatre, north (rear) side on SW Osceola Street

By the first half of the 1920s, Stuart had two theatres, both owned by the Hancock family. Nevertheless, the community responded positively to the family opening a third theatre, which included much more seating. One of the members of the family, John C. "Judge" Hancock, was tasked with erecting the building. Designed by John N. Sherwood and an associate, Mark J. Casto, the Lyric Theatre opened in March 1926, after about $100,000 was spent on its construction. The structure was also one of the largest in Martin County upon its completion. Located at 59 Southwest Flagler Avenue, the building fronts on its north side on Southwest Osceola Street. The theatre was originally used as a movie house.

The Lyric Theater is a concrete building featuring Beaux Arts and Mission/Spanish Revival-style elements of architecture. During the 1928 Okeechobee hurricane, the roof was severely damaged, and the original curtains were ruined. In the early 1930s, the Hancock family purchased equipment to be able to show talkies. Around that time, a balcony allowed African Americans to attend theatre programs in compliance with Jim Crow laws. Despite these additions, the Hancocks struggled financially during the Great Depression and were ordered in 1936 to sell the building.

In 1941, Katharine Hepburn performed in an annual Kiwanis Minstrel show held at the theatre, including reciting Edna St. Vincent Millay's "Ballad of the Harp-Weaver" poem. Similar to other downtown movie venues across the United States in the 1950s and 1960s, the Lyric Theatre struggled to compete with new movie theaters opening in places such as malls and shopping centers. Thus, it is now used primarily as a stage and music venue, as well as for churches at times. Additions were made on the west side to provide back stage space for these new uses. The additions also face on both streets. On November 12, 1993, it was added to the U.S. National Register of Historic Places.

== See also ==
- National Register of Historic Places listings in Martin County, Florida
