= Martin County Public Transit =

Public transit system of Martin County, Florida, US

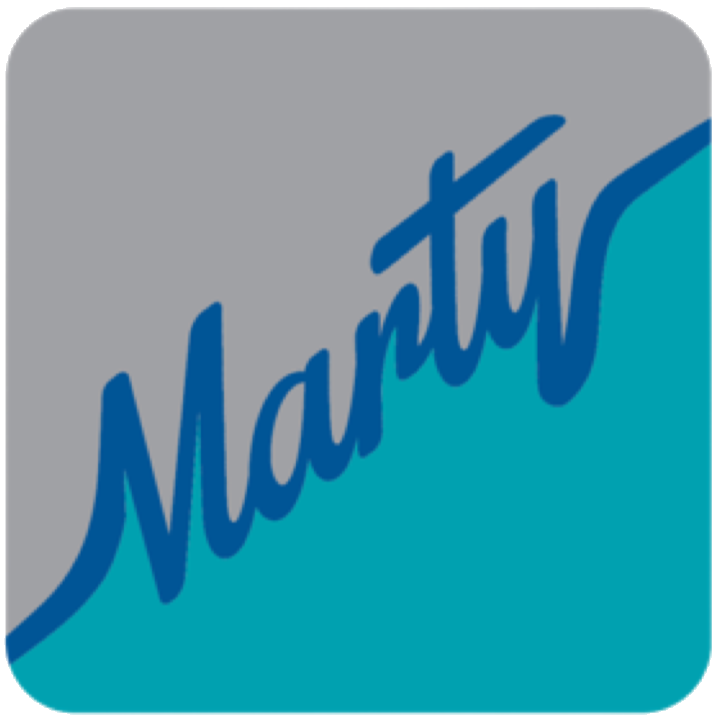
- Founded: 2013
- Headquarters: Stuart, Florida
- Service area: Martin, Palm Beach, and St. Lucie Counties, Florida
- Service type: bus service, paratransit
- Routes: 5
- Website: www.martin.fl.us/transit

Martin County Public Transit, known popularly as MARTY, is the provider of public transportation for Martin County, Florida. The system consists of five fixed bus routes, and includes connecting services with Palm Tran to the neighboring city of West Palm Beach and with the Treasure Coast Connector to Port St. Lucie.

MARTY has operated since 2013. The system also operates paratransit services, as well as a veterans transportation program.

In 2023, the Martin County Metropolitan Planning Organization began studying an expansion of MARTY bus service to Jensen Beach and Palm City, citing positive public feedback and increased demand for transit access in these communities.

== Routes ==
In total, there are five routes (2 more planned) that serve the county.

Route	Terminals			Primary streets traveled	Service notes
1	Port Salerno; US 1 & Cove Rd. East	↔	Port St. Lucie; Walmart	US 1	
2	Indiantown; Community Dr. & Salerno Rd.	↔	Stuart; Cleveland Clinic Martin South Hospital	SW Warfield Blvd.	
3	Stuart; Kiwanis P-N-R (Downtown)	↔	Stuart; Cleveland Clinic Martin North Hospital	SE Ocean Blvd., SE Dixie Hwy.	Circular Loop
4	Stuart; Walmart	↔	Hobe Sound; A1A & Adonis St.	US 1	
5	Stuart; Kiwanis P-N-R (Downtown)	↔	Jensen Beach; Treasure Coast Mall	SE Ocean Blvd., Jensen Beach Blvd	
6	Stuart; Kiwanis P-N-R (Downtown)	↔	Stuart; Indian River State College	SW Martin Downs Blvd, SW Martin Hwy	Palm City Loop
20X	Stuart; Indian River State College	↔	West Palm Beach; The Gardens Mall, VA Medical Center	US 1, I-95	Connection for Palm Tran & Tri-Rail
