= Krueger House =

- Burn Brae Plantation--Krueger House
- U.S. National Register of Historic Places
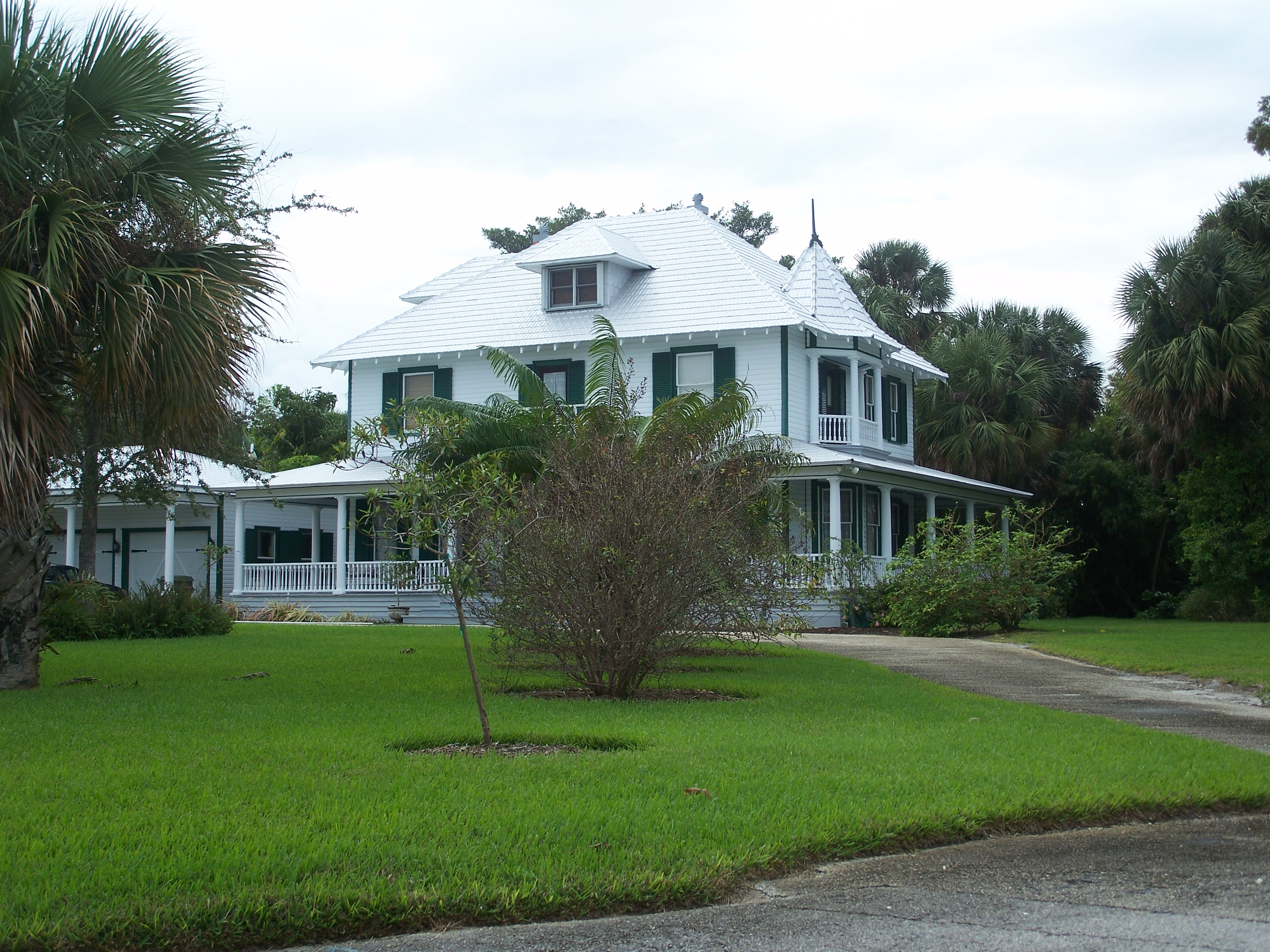

- Location within Florida Location within the United States
- Location: 1170 South East Ocean Boulevard; Stuart, Florida
- Coordinates: 27°11′47″N 80°13′56″W
- Built: 1894; 132 years ago
- NRHP reference No.: 02000002
- Added to NRHP: 14 February 2002

The Krueger House is a historic house in Stuart, Martin County, Florida. It is located on the grounds of historic Burn Brae Plantation. On February 14, 2002, it was added to the U.S. National Register of Historic Places.

== History ==
Albert Rudolph Emil Krueger, a Berlin native who initially immigrated to New York City, moved southward in 1887 and began growing pineapples and oranges. He bought the 80 acre property in Stuart, July 23, 1891, and established a pineapple plantation. He later named it Burn Brae, in honor of his Scottish wife. In Scottish, it means house on the hill by the water.

After his arrival, being a Batchelor, he built a two room shack of real Florida lumber on the grounds, along a spring-fed creek that meandered out to the St. Lucie River. The creek (today called Krueger Creek) was dredged to allow the transfer of supplies to his pineapple and citrus farms. He was called "The Dude" because he was always dressed in starched collars and a Derby Hat.

Krueger married Annie Donaldson Kincaid Speirs in 1893, and by 1897 had three sons and one daughter needing a bigger home. Contractor Henry Klopp began construction on a two-story grand home in October 1903 and the family moved into the completed home in mid-February 1904. The house features the bottom floor with a wrap-around porch, four bedrooms, a large attic room with handmade trusses, and is built with Heart Pine.

The house was restored by Bill and Anne Krueger Stimmell from 1997 to 2002.

== See also ==
- National Register of Historic Places listings in Florida
