= Old Martin County Courthouse =

- Old Martin County Court House
- U.S. National Register of Historic Places
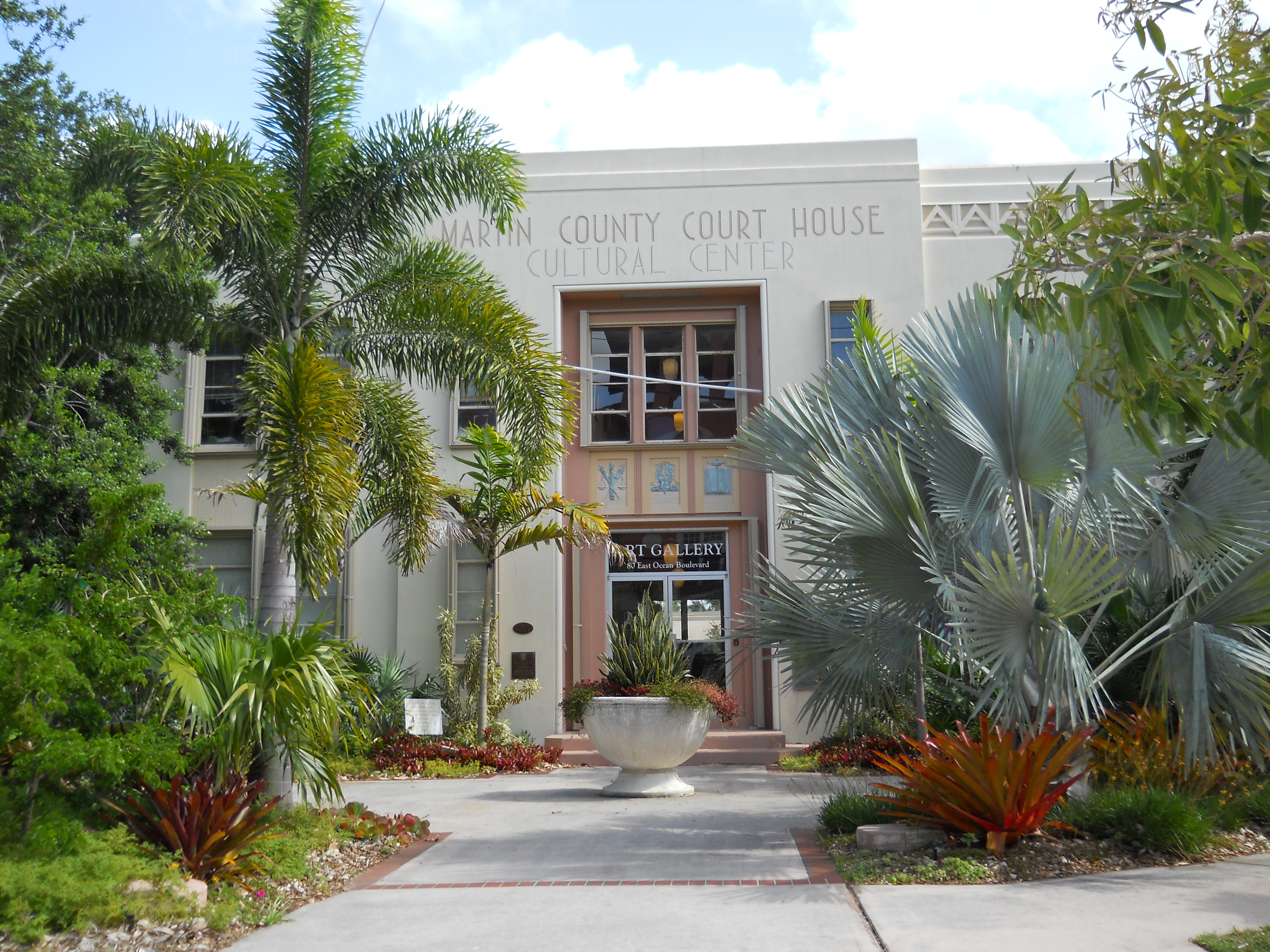
- Front (north) facade

- Location within Florida Location within the United States
- Location: 80 SE Ocean Boulevard; Stuart, Florida
- Coordinates: 27.19724°N 80.25083°W
- Area: less than one acre
- Built: 1937
- Architect: L. Phillips Clarke; builder: Chalker & Lund
- Architectural style: Modern Movement, Art Deco
- NRHP reference No.: 97001329
- Added to NRHP: November 07, 1997

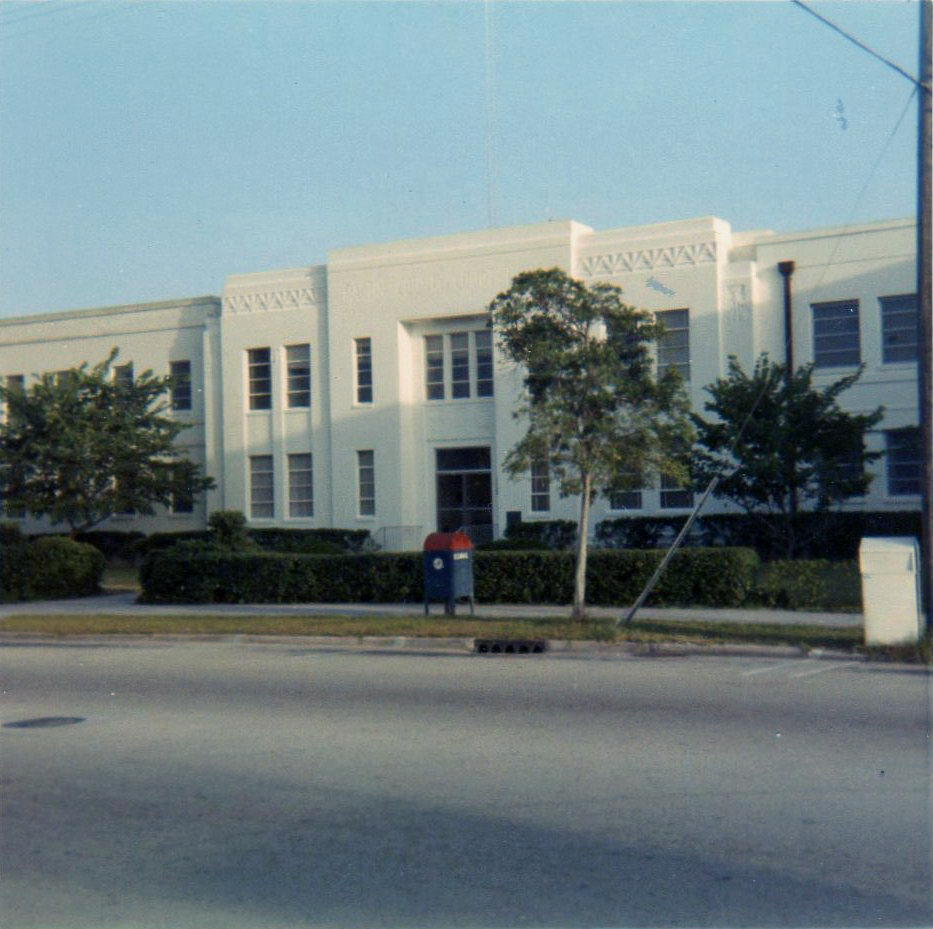
Martin County Courthouse in 1969

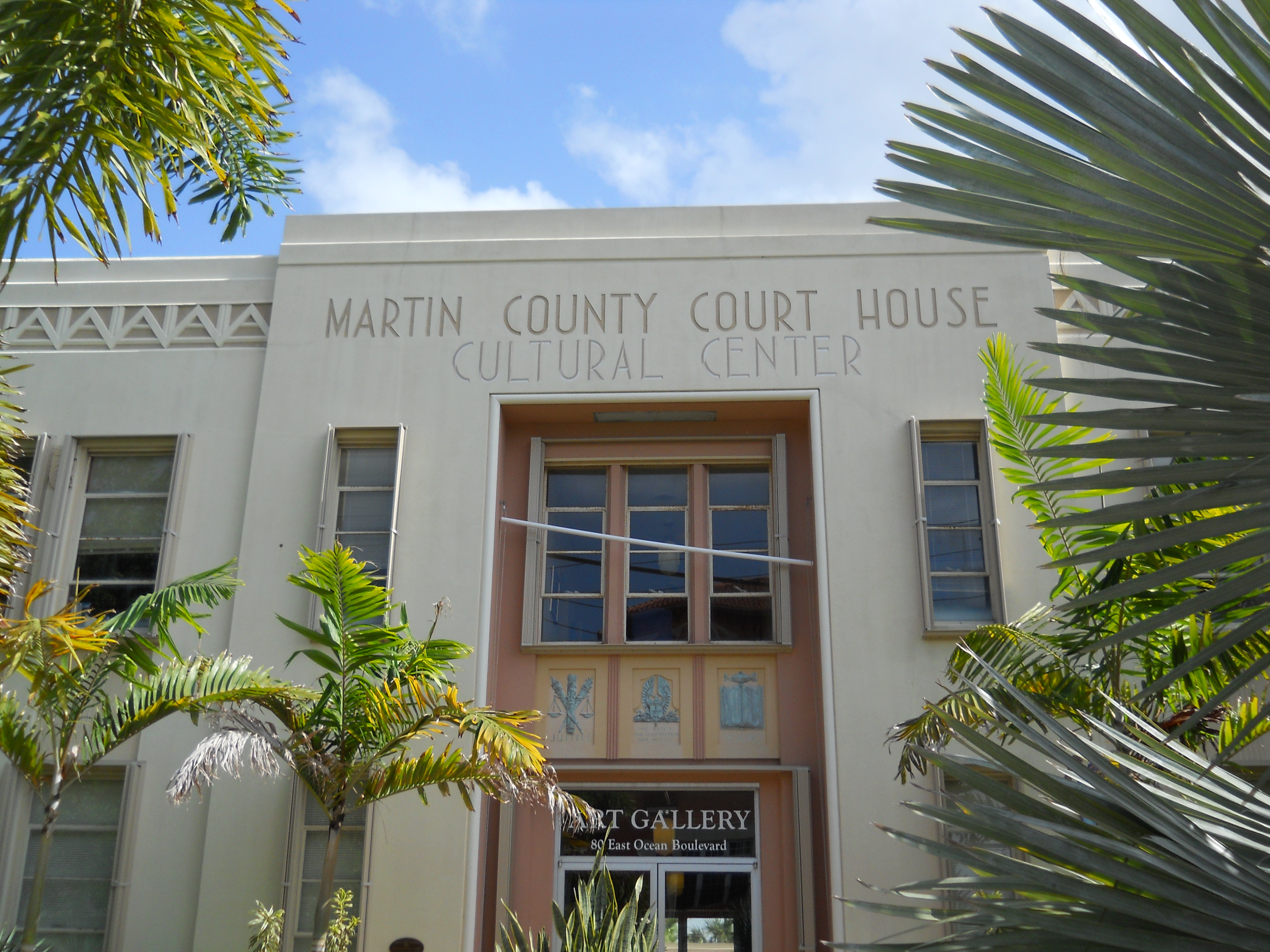
Front (north)entrance detail

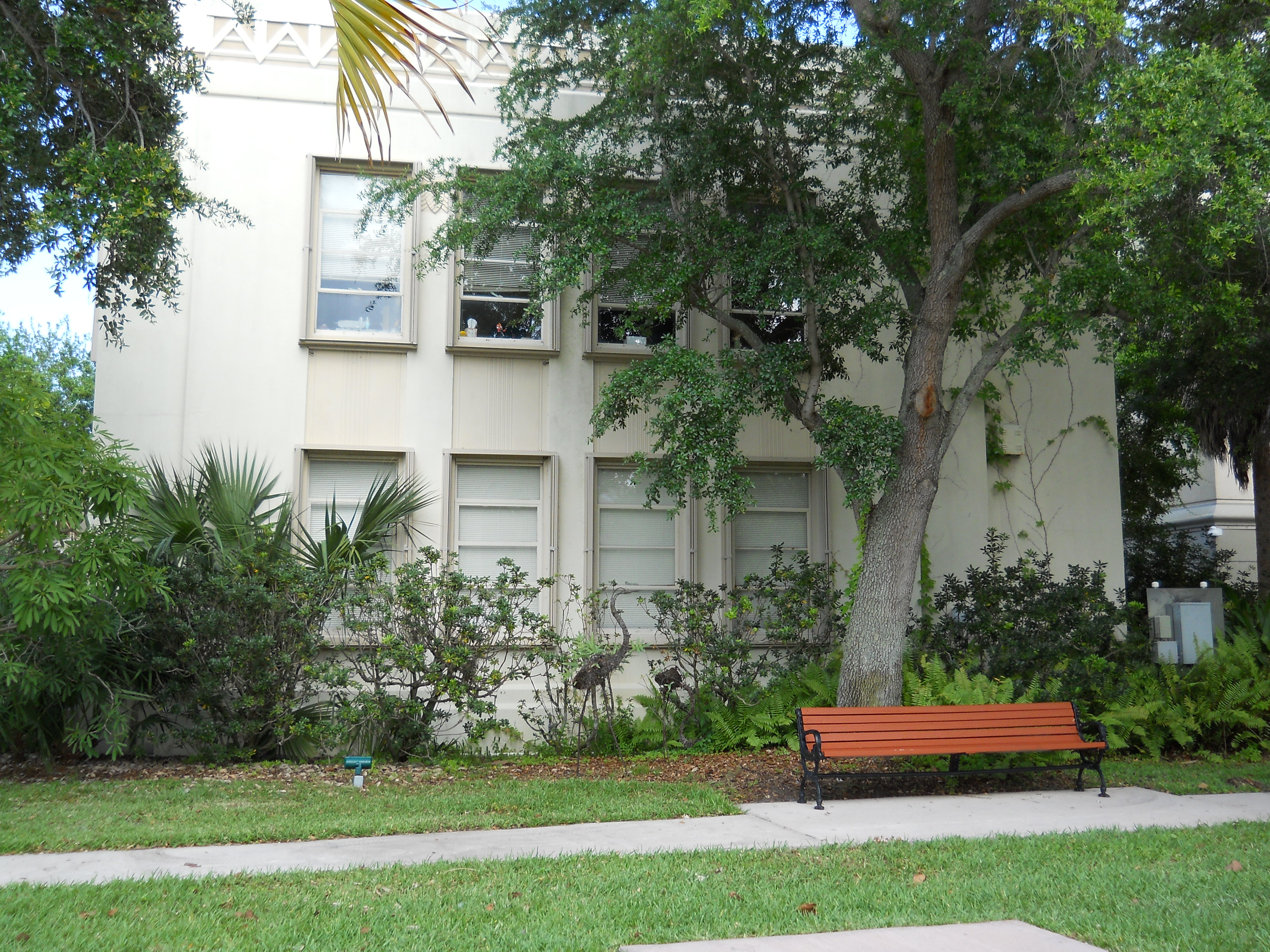
West side facade. In 1954 this side was covered by the construction of a west wing. A corner of the new courthouse is shown in the right center edge

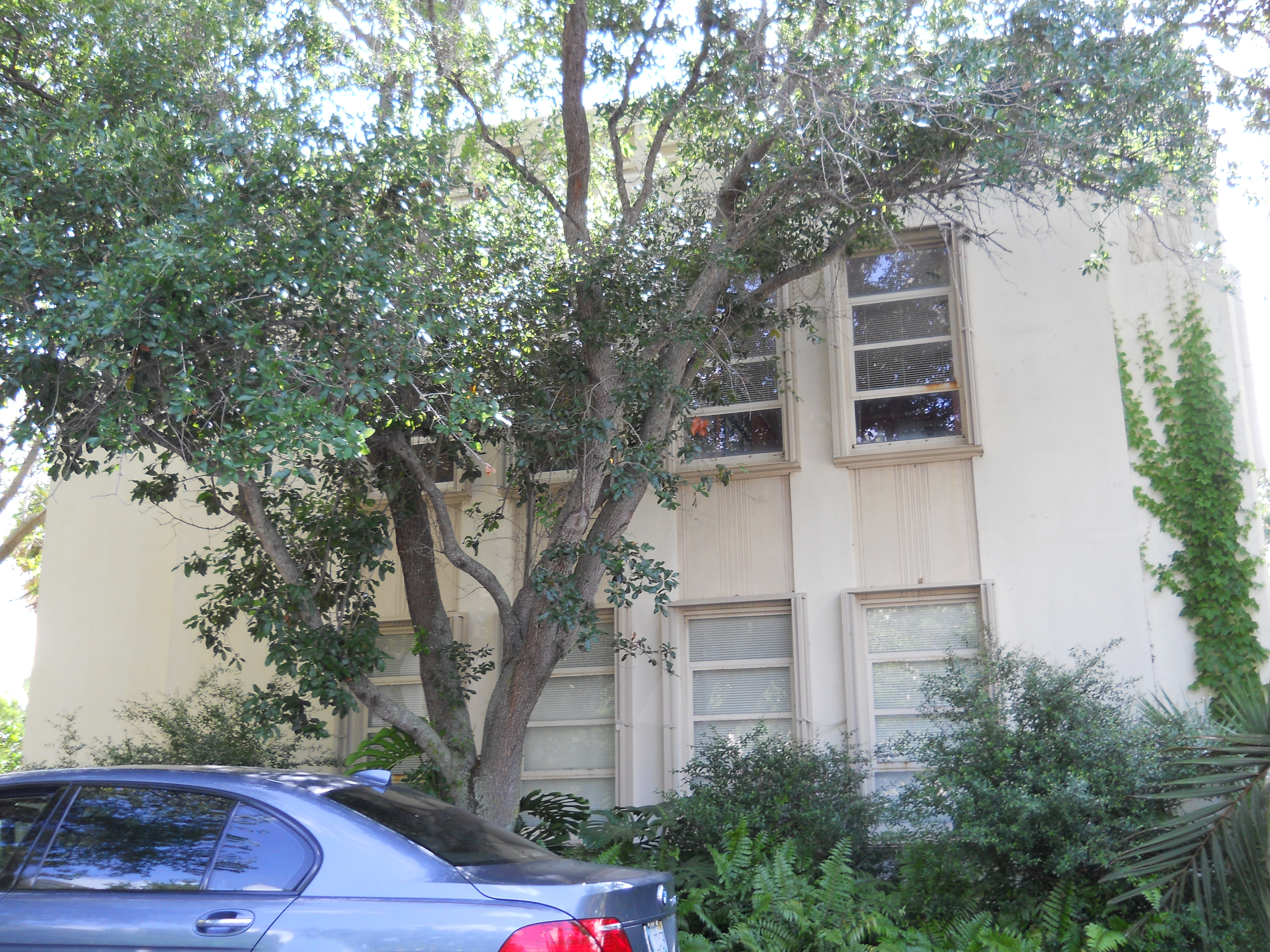
East side facade. In 1954 this side was covered by the construction of an east wing.

The Old Martin County Court House, built in 1937, 12 years after the erection and organization of Martin County (separated from the two adjacent counties to the north - St. Lucie County) and to the south - Palm Beach County), is a historic Art Deco style of architecture courthouse building located at 80 Southeast Ocean Boulevard in the county seat and largest town of Stuart, Martin County, Florida.

In 1989, it was listed in A Guide to Florida's Historic Architecture, published by the University of Florida Press. On November 7, 1997, it was also added to the U.S. National Register of Historic Places, maintained by the National Park Service, of the United States Department of the Interior On March 15, 2007, it was added to the Martin County Historic Register by the Martin County Historic Preservation Board. It is now known as the Courthouse Cultural Center and is the headquarters of the Arts Council, Inc., the designated local arts agency for Martin County.

== Building history ==
The building was designed by local noted architect L. Phillips Clarke formerly of Pittsburgh, Pennsylvania and later West Palm Beach by the 1920s, with a prominent active firm / partnership of Harvey and Clarke which designed the landmark structure plus numerous other buildings in the South Florida region over several decades. It was constructed by Chalker & Lund of poured concrete walls with terrazzo floors in the Art Deco style of architecture popular in that era for the Federal Government's new agency and New Deal program to combat the mass unemployment and bad economic conditions of the worldwide Great Depression of the 1930s. The construction project was funded by the Works Progress Administration (W.P.A.) during the early 32nd Presidency of Franklin D. Roosevelt (1882-1945, served 1933-1945). A later northern addition to the first Martin County courthouse, which had been built three decades before in 1908, and had been used as a Palm Beach County public school building and later renovated when converted to courthouse use after Martin County was created in 1925. The four words, Martin County Court House, were prominently etched into the front of the addition, where they still remain. Because of this, both the National Register and the Cultural Center have retained the two-word spelling of "Court House" even though the one-word version is the current preferred one.

Seventeen years later in 1954, the growing county bought a building to the west that had been used as an automobile sales dealership by Web Ordway Ford and later as an A & P (Great Atlantic and Pacific Tea Company) grocery food store and converted it into a needed courthouse annex. At the same time, the county extended the original 1908 courthouse and the 1937 addition west to abut the annex and joined their hallways. The county also extended the 1937 addition and the old school house on the east side. Both of these 1954 additions were bland, modernistic utilitarian structures of no particular architectural merit.

Later when the county outgrew this assemblage of buildings, it decided to build a new courthouse and constitutional officers complex to the south of the original courthouse and to tear down the original courthouse, all additions and the annex. The City of Stuart, though, with much public support, prevailed on the county commission to save the 1937 addition and to use it as a cultural center. There was some sentiment to save the original schoolhouse building, but this was determined not to be feasible.

== Resources ==
- Florida's Historic Courthouses by Hampton Dunn (ISBN 0-9653759-5-1)
