= Gate House (Jupiter Island, Florida) =

- Formerly listed on the U.S. National Register of Historic Places
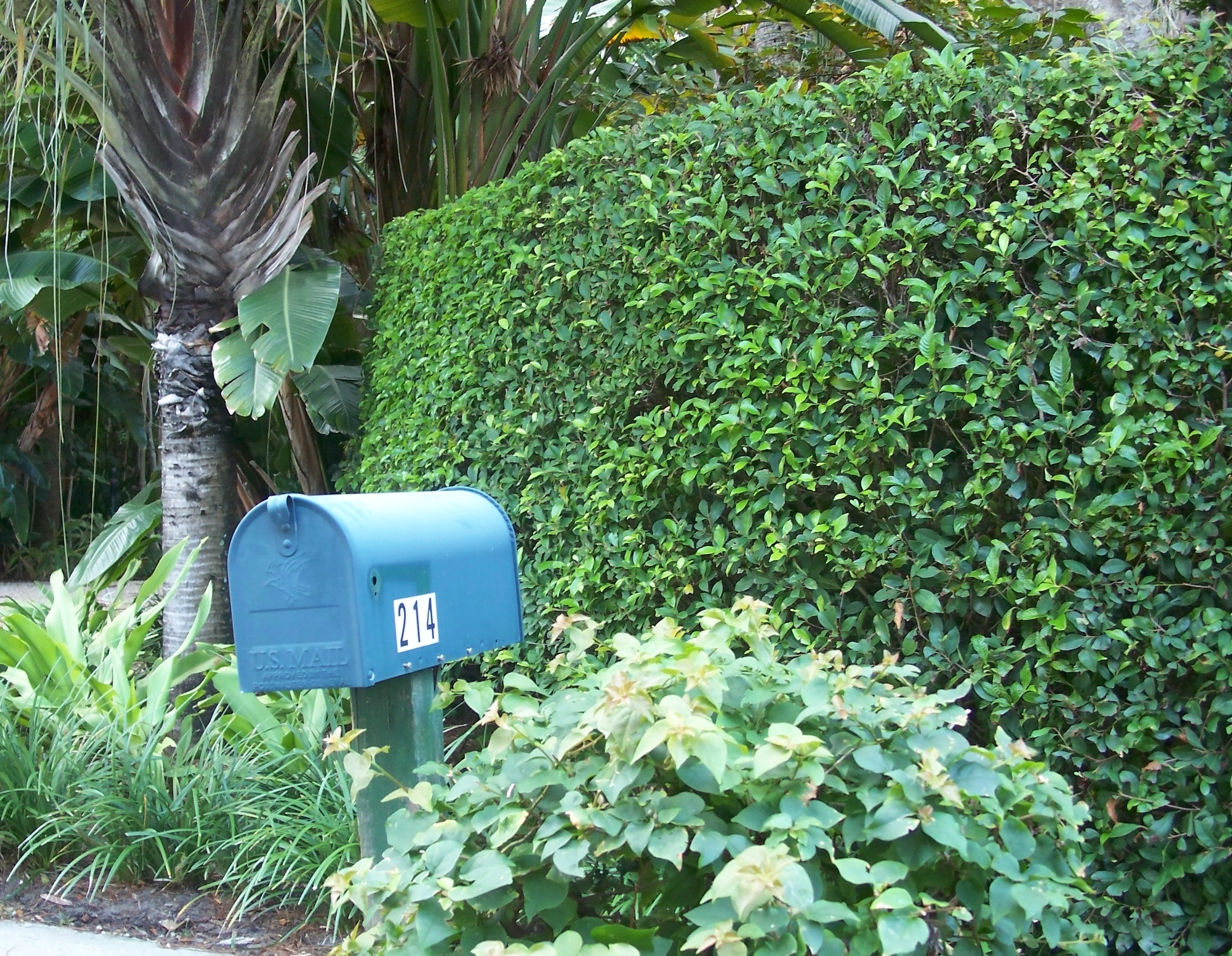
- Outside the property

- Location within Florida Location within the United States
- Location: 214 S. Beach Rd., Jupiter Island, Florida
- Coordinates: 27°2′9″N 80°6′16″W
- Built: 1927
- Architectural style: Mission/Spanish Revival
- NRHP reference No.: 01001246

Significant dates
- Added to NRHP: November 21, 2001
- Removed from NRHP: September 29, 2026

The Gate House is an historic single-family home located at 214 South Beach Road in Jupiter Island, Florida. On November 21, 2001, it was added to the U.S. National Register of Historic Places. For several years, it was owned by Edsel Ford.
