= Jensen Beach Christian Church =

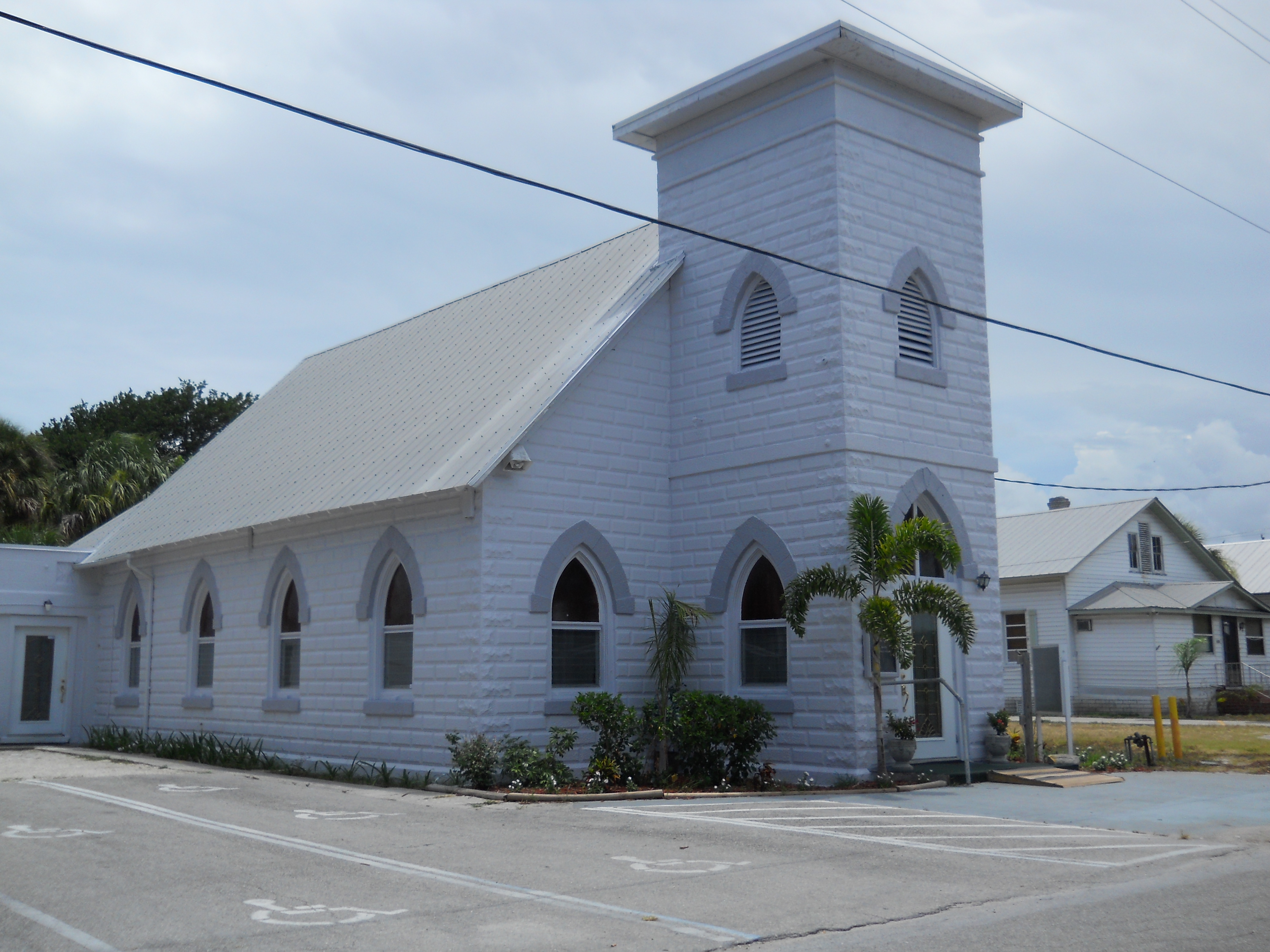
- Jensen Beach Christian Church
- Interactive map of the Jensen Beach Christian Church area

General information
- Architectural style: Gothic Revival
- Location: 1890 N.E. Church Street, Jensen Beach, Florida, United States
- Coordinates: 27.24588°N 80.22704°W
- Construction started: 1910
- Completed: 1912

Technical details
- Structural system: One story building with two story entrance/bell tower using site manufactured concrete blocks cast to look like stones

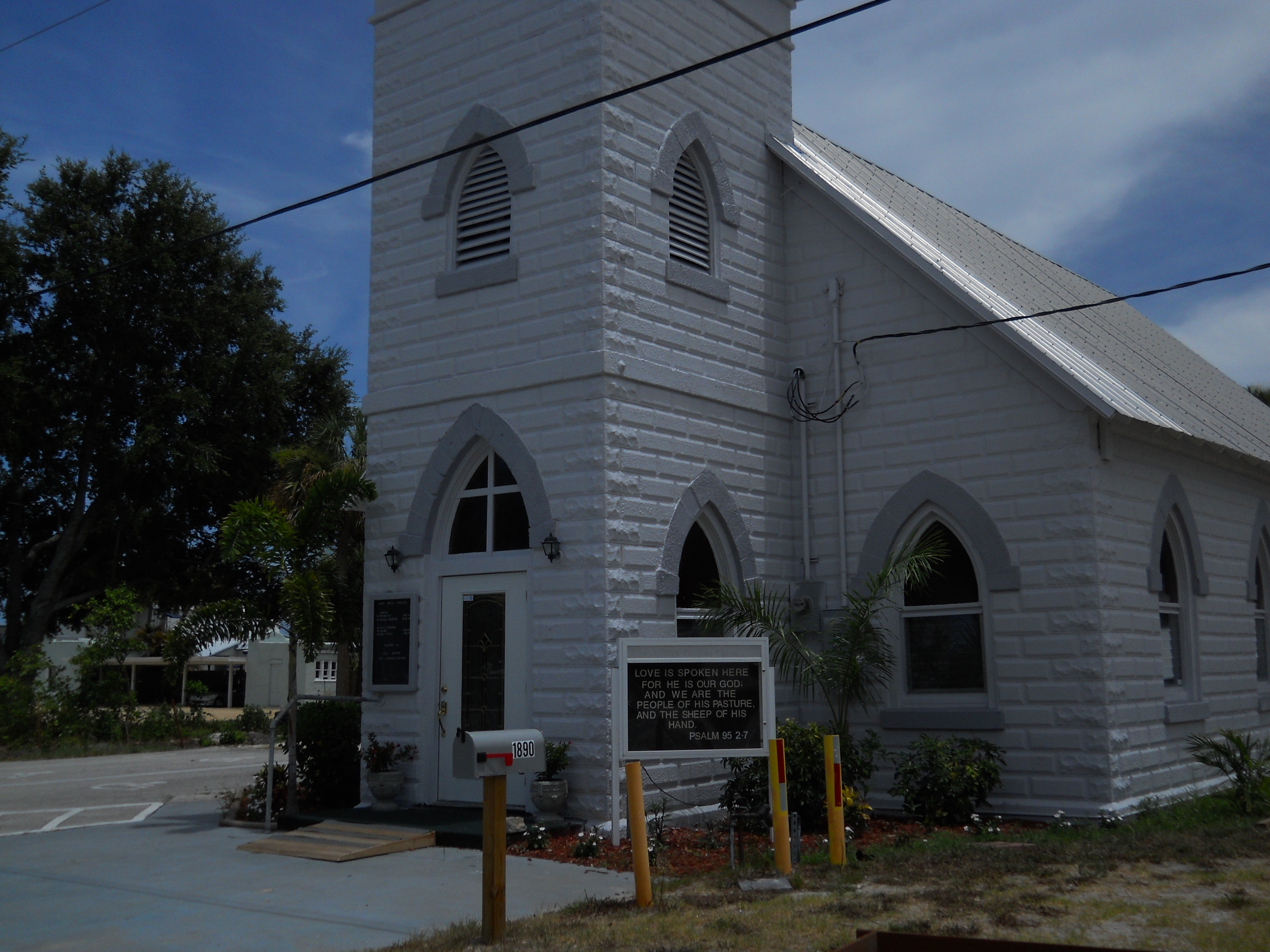
Jensen Beach Christian Church entrance detail

The Jensen Beach Christian Church, originally known as the Jensen Union Church, is an historic church building located at 1890 N.E. Church Street in Jensen Beach, Florida. Built in the Gothic Revival style between 1910 and 1912 of site manufactured concrete blocks cast to look like stones, it was designed to serve the needs of local Protestants. Its pulpit and pews, which are still in use, were donated by Henry Morrison Flagler, the developer of the Florida East Coast Railway, whose mainline still runs through Jensen Beach less than a block west of the church.

On June 7, 2010, the Jensen Beach Christian Church was added to the Martin County Historic Register by the Martin County Historic Preservation Board.

== History ==
In 1894 an interdenominational Protestant Sunday School was organized in what was then called Jensen. It met first at the Al Fresco Hotel, then the town hall and later the school. By 1898, the Episcopalians had left to form All Saints Episcopal Church at Waveland. In 1905 the Florida Baptist Board of Missions sent the Rev. E.E. Woodson to preach on the fourth Sunday of each month. Until he left for New Smyrna, the Rev. Harry H. Jones of the Union Congregational Church in nearby Eden also came down to preach on some Sundays and Wednesdays. In 1906 local pioneers, Ranson Ren Tilton and Gertrude Tilton, his wife, offered the land on Church Street for a church to be built. A Ladies Aid Society was formed in 1906 to raise money for the building. In 1910 the Tiltons deeded the property to the Ladies Aid Society and construction began. The Jensen Union Church opened in 1912. The Baptists later left to form First Baptist Church. The Rev. Mr. Jones returned in the 1920s to serve as pastor of the church until 1950. In 1932 the congregation became the Jensen Community Church, but it was not until 1938 that the land was deeded to it by the Ladies Aid Society. In 1962 the congregation by then known as the Jensen Beach Community Church moved to a new building on Skyline Drive. The Church Street building was sold to a new congregation, the Jensen Beach Christian Church.

The exterior concrete blocks were originally not painted but were later painted white. In 1931 an addition was added on the rear of the church and in 1952 a kitchen-Sunday School wing was added to the east of that addition. In 2009 the church exterior was painted a bright yellow with gray trim, but was repainted white in May 2009 in order to gain recognition by the local historic preservation board. The gray trim has been retained.
