= Dorothy Geeben =

American mayor (1908–2010)

Mayor of Ocean Breeze Park, Florida
- In office 2001 – January 11, 2010
- Preceded by: Ruth Hoke
- Succeeded by: David W. Myers

Personal details
- Born: Dorothy Pauline Winter; March 31, 1908 Mondovi, Wisconsin
- Died: January 11, 2010 (aged 101) Stuart, Florida
- Resting place: Marion, Iowa
- Spouse(s): Cornelius "Neal" Bunting (1891–1958; his death); Albert Geeben (1963–1965; his death)
- Children: 1
- Profession: Politician

Dorothy P. Geeben (née Winter; March 31, 1908 – January 11, 2010) was the oldest mayor in the United States. She served as the second mayor of Ocean Breeze Park, Florida from 2001 to 2010.

Geeben began her public service work on the Ocean Breeze Town Council in 1960. She became the council's president in 1976 and served in that capacity for thirty-one years. In 2001, after the death of Ruth Hoke, the first mayor and widow of Gene Hoke, son of the town founders, Harry and Queena Hoke, Geeben was chosen to be the next mayor. She served as mayor for the next nine years, running unopposed in the 2002 and 2004 mayoral elections. Geeben died on January 11, 2010, after missing the town meeting because she felt ill.

== Political career ==
Geeben started serving on the Ocean Breeze Town Council in 1960. Beginning in 1976, Geeben served as council president of Ocean Breeze Park, Florida, for thirty-one years. In 2001, after the death of Mayor Ruth Hoke, widow of the Gene Hoke, Geeben was selected to be the next mayor. In the 2002 and 2004 mayoral election, no one ran against her.

When she was ninety-four years old, Geeben saved Jansen Beach Christian Church from closing down. At the time, the church lacked a minister and had four parishioners remaining. Geeben's efforts revived the church, enabling it to retain a pastor and increase church membership to 100 people.

In 2004, NBC ran a segment about Geeben after filming her for a day.

In 2008, Geeben counseled her constituents when they were afraid that they would be forced to move. The people's homes were located in a park that was going to be sold. In March of that year, Geeben helped mediate a deal that enabled the forty-six acres of residential area in the park to be bought for $26 million.

Known as "Mayor Dorothy", Geeben characterized her role on the council as being ceremonial. She affixed her signature to checks as well participated in council meetings.

== Personal life ==
Dorothy P. Winter was born on March 31, 1908, in Mondovi, Wisconsin. During her childhood, she contracted polio but did not let the disease hinder her.

She graduated from Marion High School, in Marion, Iowa, where she married Cornelius "Neal" Bunting, an electrician. They founded Bunting Electric, with her working as the bookkeeper. In 1952, she moved to Ocean Breeze Park, Florida, where she and her husband retired and purchased a mobile home. After her first husband's death, she married Albert Geeben in 1963, but he died less than two years later.

As mayor, Geeben drove herself around in a 1983 Mercury Marquis. Every Sunday, she drove the few blocks north to the Jensen Beach Christian Church, where she was the treasurer and organist. Every week, she played bingo, and occasionally, she would go to the hair salon. Geeben balanced her bills through a typewriter and adding machine, just as she did in the 1920s.

Geeben revealed that her secret to long life was always to be busy. She said, "I have a good time. I'm on the go a lot. I guess that's half the battle." She received her exercise through a pedaling machine, which she used to invigorate her knees. She did not smoke or drink alcohol and typically slept at 11 pm and then would awake at 5:30 the next morning.

On her 100th birthday, Geeben received letters from First Lady Laura Bush and Florida Governor Charlie Crist in tribute of the special occasion.

== Death ==
On January 11, 2010, the Ocean Breeze Town Council held a council meeting which Geeben did not attend because she was feeling ill. She believed that she had a cold. That afternoon, she was transported to the Martin Memorial Medical Center where she died. At the time of her death, she was survived by her son, John Bunting, two grandchildren, seven great-grandchildren, and four great-great-grandchildren.

Funeral arrangements in Iowa were by Murdoch Funeral Home and Cremation Center in Marion, Iowa. Geeben was buried in Marion next to her late first husband, Cornelius "Neal" Bunting.
