= Stuart Welcome Arch =

- U.S. National Register of Historic Places
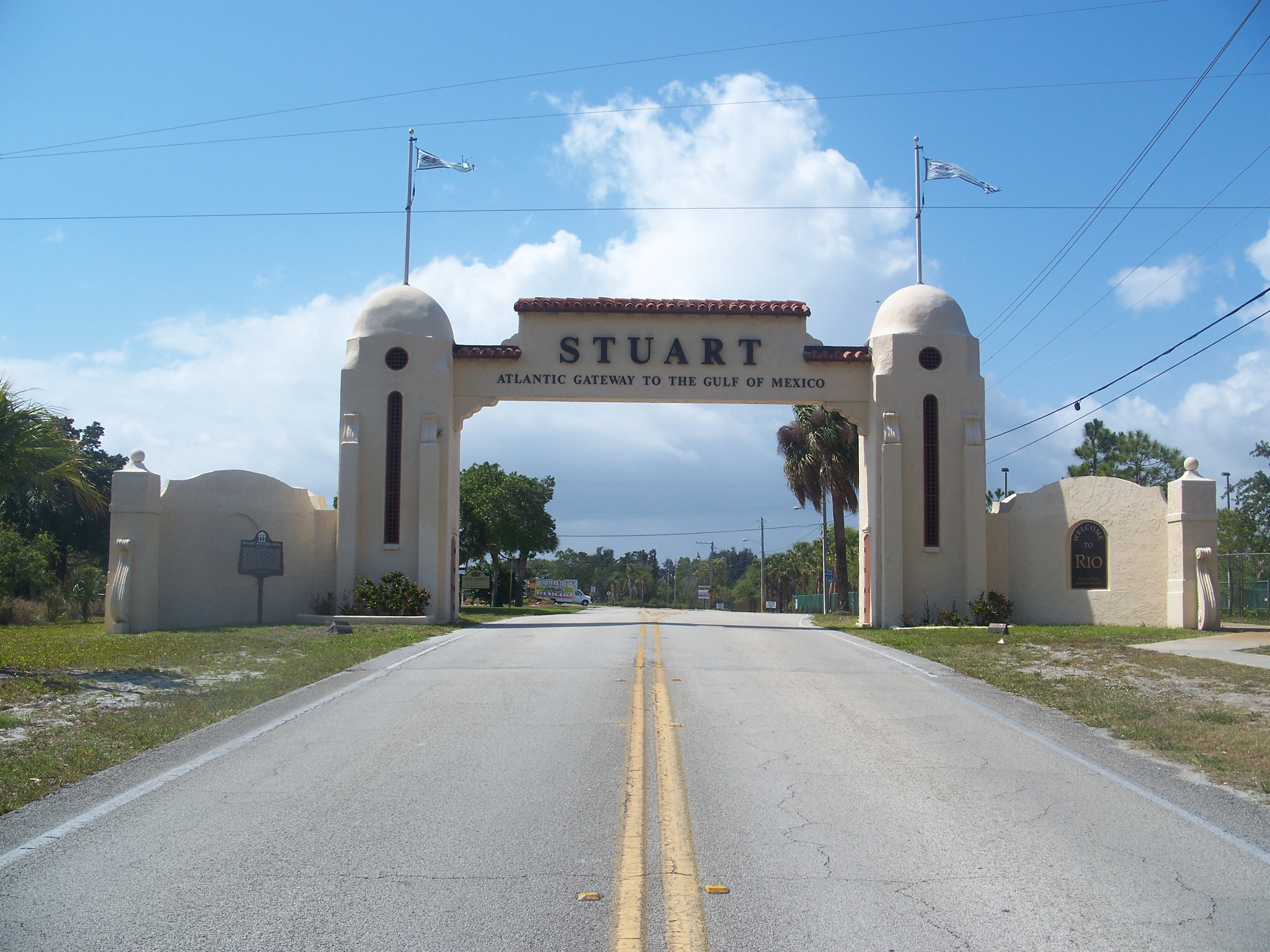
- Stuart Welcome Arch from the north: 2011

- Location within Florida Location within the United States
- Location: Bet. 2369 and 2390 NE Dixie Hwy, Jensen Beach, Florida
- Coordinates: 27°13′31″N 80°13′13″W
- Area: less than one acre
- Built: 1926
- Architect: Nat C. Hodgdon; A.L. Doenges
- Architectural style: Moorish Revival and Mediterranean Revival
- NRHP reference No.: 04000971
- Added to NRHP: September 15, 2004

The Stuart Welcome Arch (also known as the 1926 Welcome Arch or Rio-Jensen Beach Arch) is an historic arch-shaped gateway that straddles County Road 707 between 2369 and 2390 Northeast Dixie Highway in Jensen Beach, Florida. It was built in 1926 to mark what were then the town lines of incorporated Jensen and Stuart and to herald Stuart as a "Gateway to the Gulf of Mexico."

== History ==
=== Early history ===
The Town of Stuart was incorporated in 1914 and charted as the Seat of the newly-created Martin County in 1927, where the "town" was changed to "city." During this period, Stuart's limits extended to the southern portion of CR 707. One year later, the Town of Jensen incorporated and covered all the area just north of the Arch.

The Arch was constructed during the Florida land boom and celebrated the opening of the Okeechobee Waterway (then called the Stuart-Ft. Myers cross-State channel), which was heralded at the time as an efficient way to get across the state.

During the Great Depression, the Town of Jensen went bankrupt and was dissolved by the State of Florida. In 1933, the State of Florida forced Stuart to retrocede most of its area north of the St. Lucie River, including the area surrounding the Arch. According to its modern dedication, during the Depression, the Arch was a frequent target of theft.

With both surrounding municipalities having disappeared from its surroundings, the Arch became located entirely within the unincorporated area of Martin County.

=== 1940s to 1990s ===
From the 1940s to the 1990s, various changes and modifications were made to the Welcome Arch. In 1949, hurricane winds blew down the primary crossbeam, which was re-installed in 1954 with an additional hanging structure. It was painted red, white, and blue in 1976, after which a car crash required reconstructing the east tower, which began in 1977. Later, the Arch was painted hot pink in 1994. In 1998, the replacement crossbeam was again struck by a garbage truck and the replacement signage included language: “Welcome to Rio” on the northern face and “Welcome to Jensen Beach" on the southern face.

=== Restoration ===
As part of community redevelopment efforts occurring in nearby Rio, restoration efforts restarted on the Arch in the early 2000s. County goals involved achieving historical registration, which required substantial effort restoring the original character, design, and signage of the Arch. This included removing "Rio" and "Jensen Beach" in favor of the original "Stuart" and "Jensen," despite the fact the City of Stuart no longer abutted the Arch and the Town of Jensen had been dissolved decades prior.

On September 15, 2004, it was added to the U.S. National Register of Historic Places.

=== Gallery ===
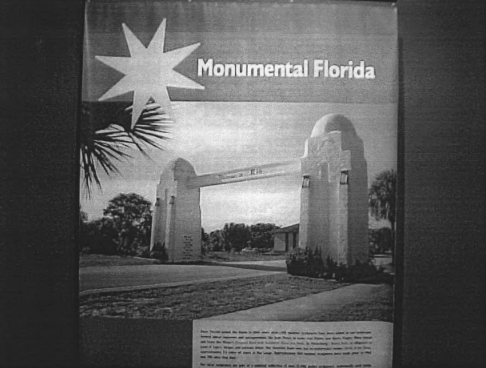
Arch as of early-2000s. Note crossbeam with and different text on signage.

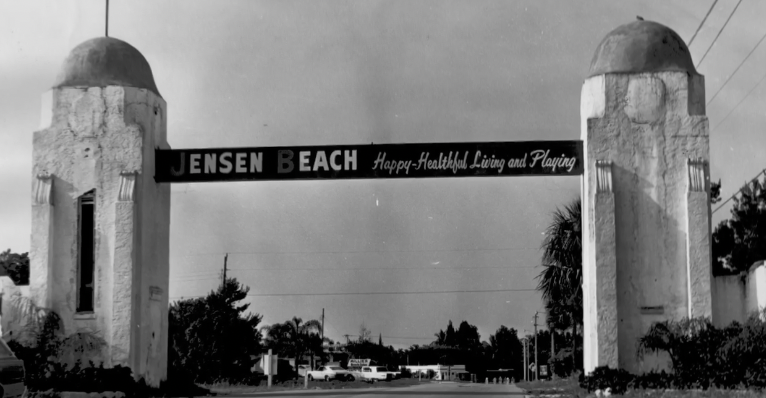
Arch as of 1971. Note reduction in crossbeam width and different text on signage.

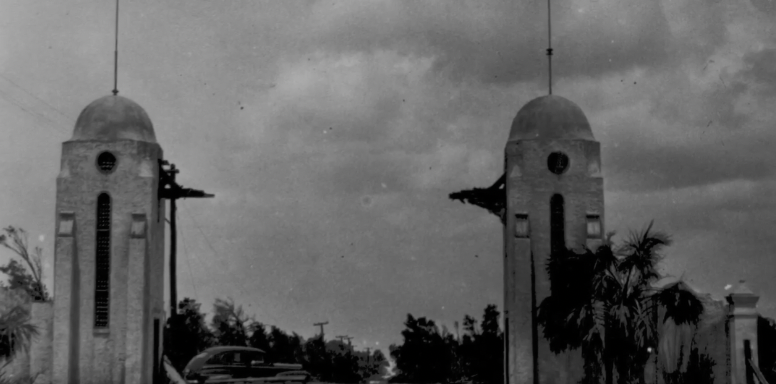
Arch in 1949 following damage to the crossbeam.

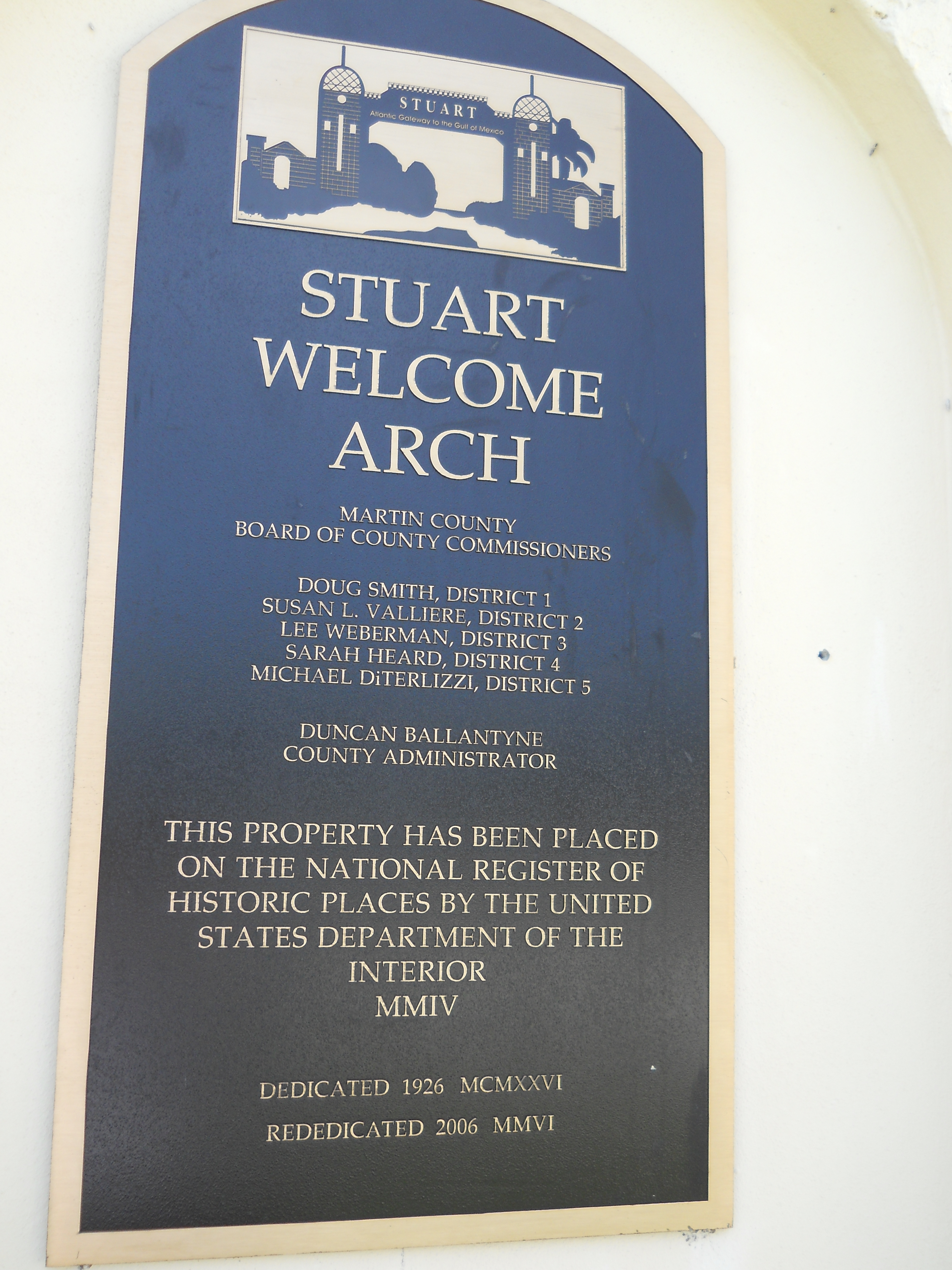
Arch dedication plaque, modern day.

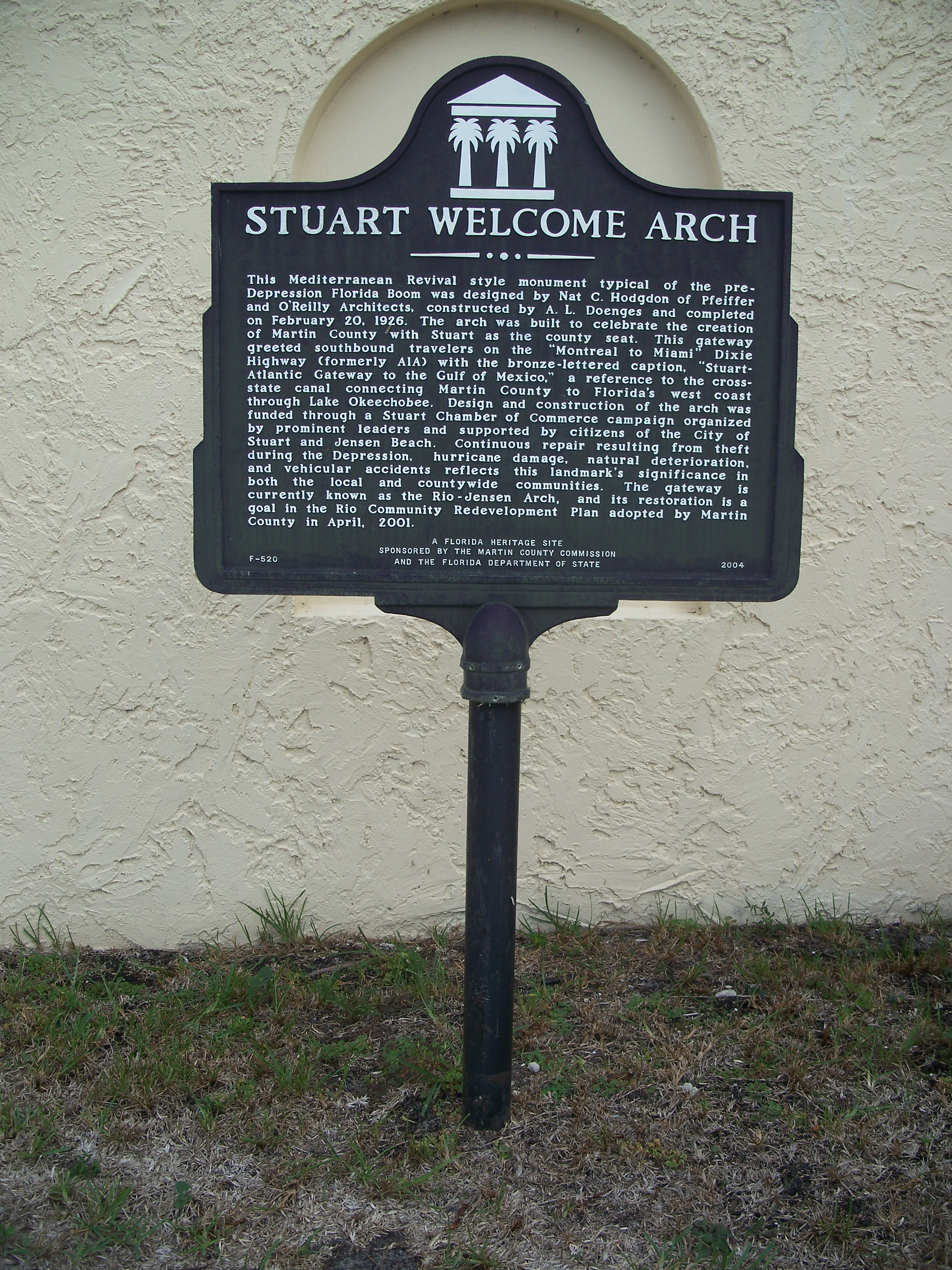
Arch historical marker sign, modern day.

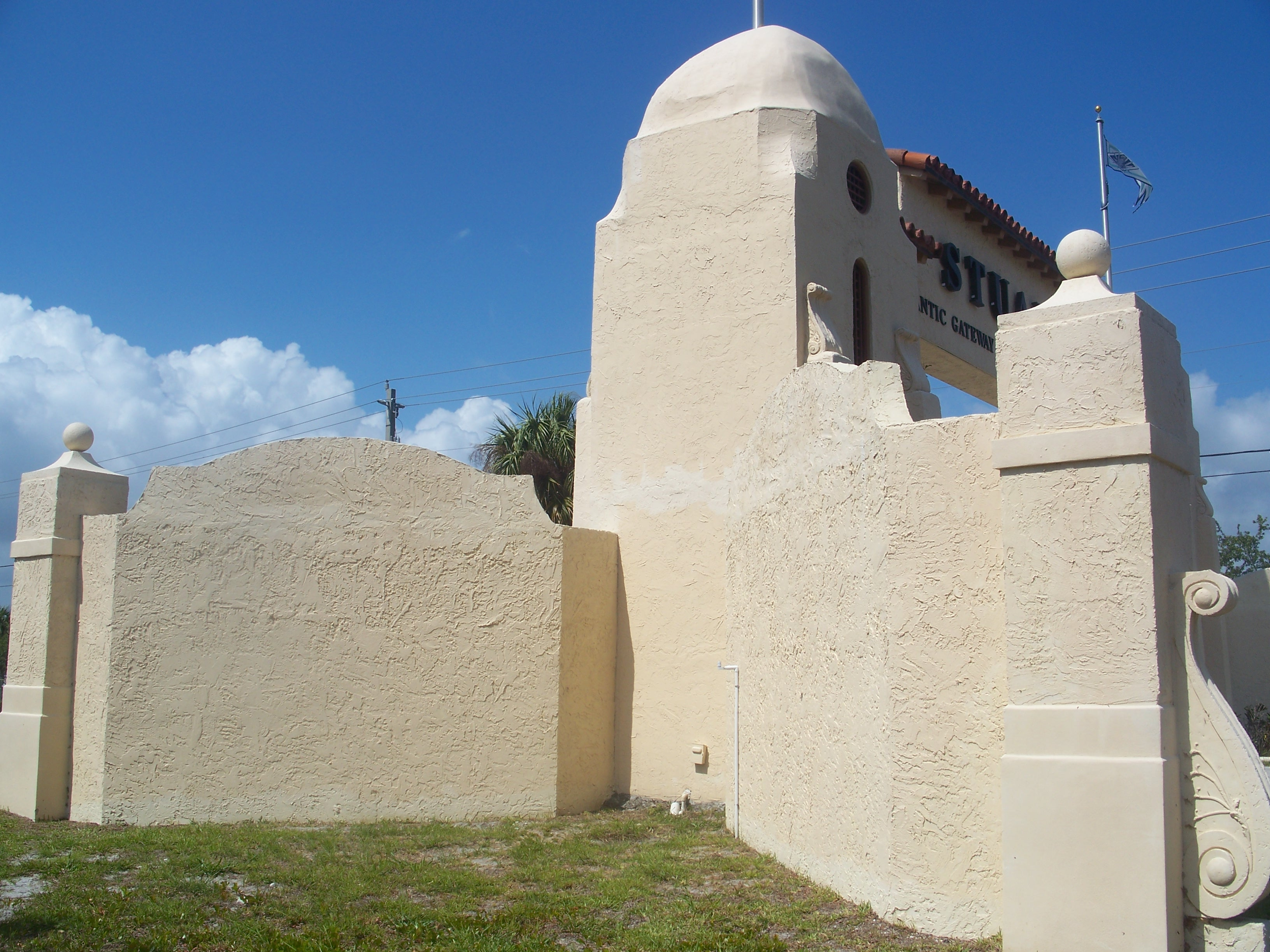
Northern edge of the Arch, modern day.
