= Capt. John Miller House =

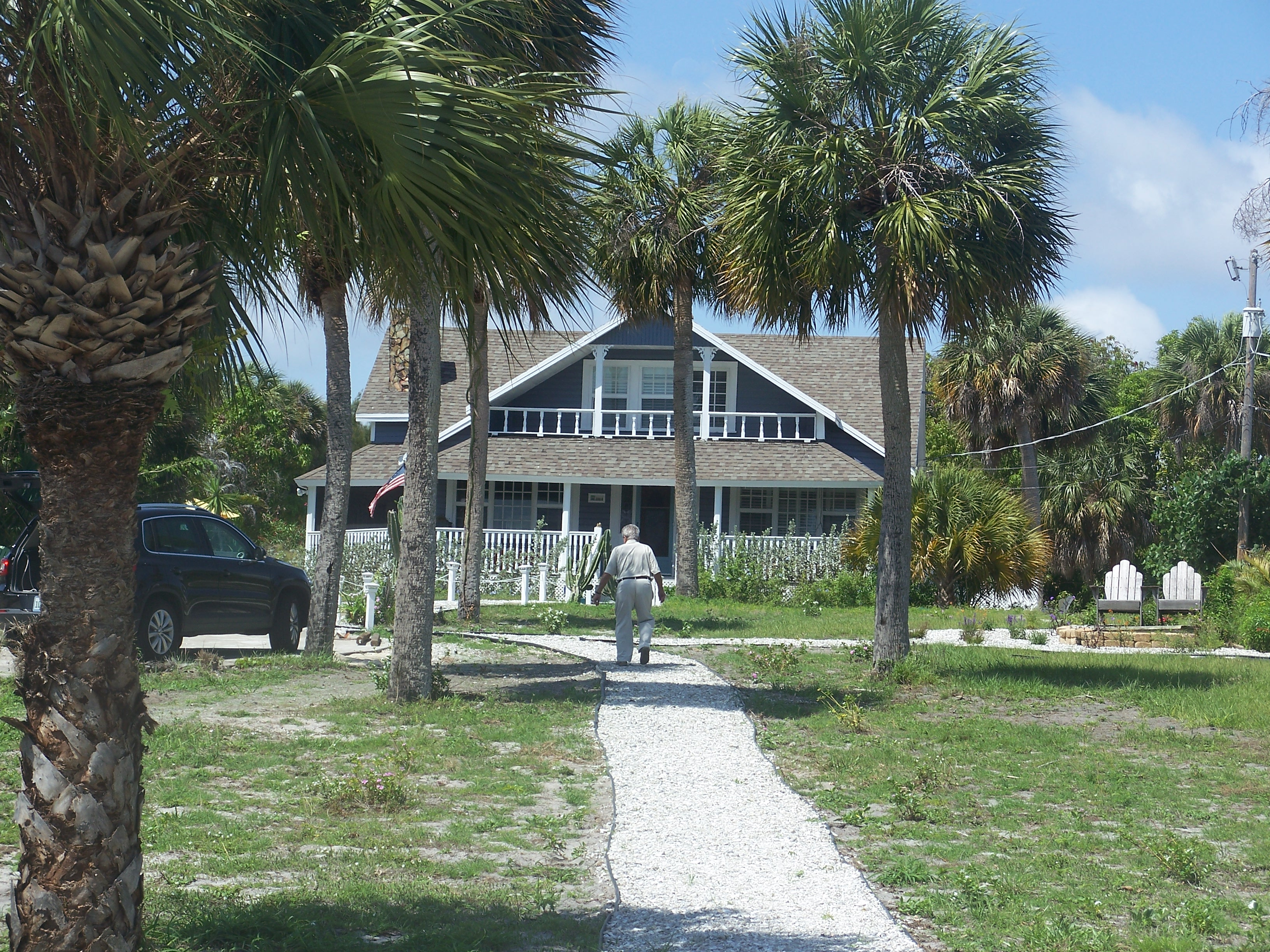
- Interactive map of the Capt. John Miller House area

General information
- Location: 12387 S. Indian River Drive, Eden, St. Lucie County, Florida, mailing address Jensen Beach, Florida, United States
- Coordinates: 27.28694°N 80.24870°W
- Construction started: 1889
- Completed: 1901
- Client: himself

Design and construction
- Architect: Capt. John Miller

The Capt. John Miller House is an historic wooden house at what is now 12387 South Indian River Drive, in St. Lucie County, Florida. Its mail comes from the Jensen Beach post office in nearby Martin County. Built by local pioneer Capt. John Miller beginning around 1889 and ending around 1901, it started as a two-room one-story house and ended up a ten-room two-story house with a cross-gabled roof. In 1989, it was listed in A Guide to Florida's Historic Architecture, published by the University of Florida Press.
