= Waveland, Florida =

Former community in what is now Martin County, Florida

Coordinates: 27°16′N 80°12′W

- Ghost town
- Established: 1797
- Founder: Willis Green

Waveland, Florida, was a community in what is now Martin County, Florida, which encompassed all of Sewall's Point, that part of Rio lying east of Warner Creek, and that part of Jensen Beach lying south of N.E. Center Street, more or less.

A U.S. post office was established in Waveland on September 2, 1880, but its name was changed to Sewall's Point on May 4, 1891. On December 4, 1891, a new Waveland post office was established which continued until August 31, 1918, when it was merged into the Jensen post office, which became Jensen Beach on June 1, 1943.

The name of Waveland has to this day been associated with All Saints Episcopal Church and its cemetery. N.E. Waveland Avenue is a present-day road which runs south from N.E. Dixie Highway in eastern Rio. There is also a Waveland Beach Strip on Hutchinson Island in St. Lucie County, but it is not related to this former community.

== See also ==
- List of ghost towns in Florida
