= Jensen Beach, Florida =

- Census-designated place
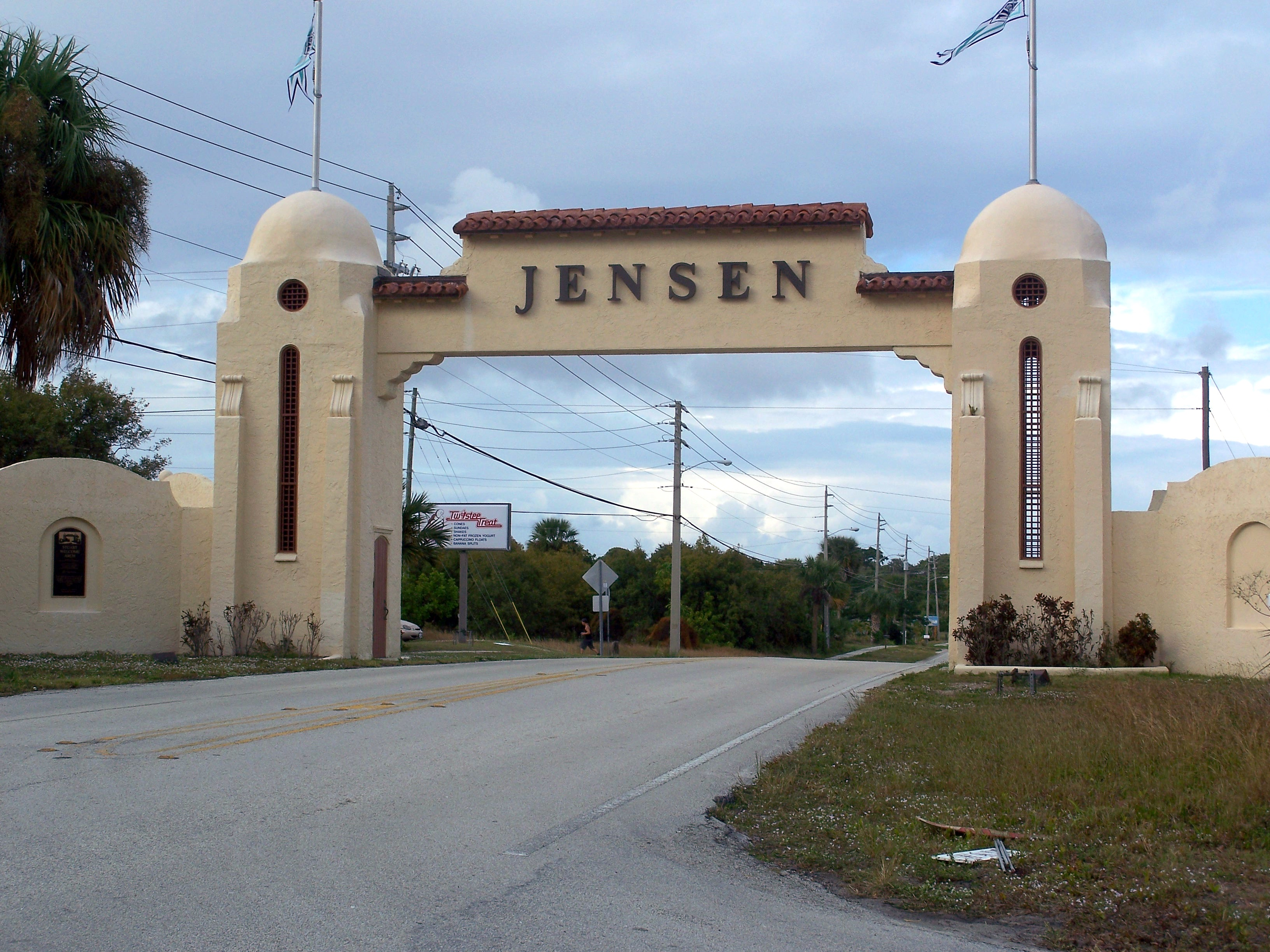
- Welcome arch on CR 707

- Location in Martin County and the state of Florida
- Coordinates: 27°15′05″N 80°14′50″W
- Country: United States
- State: Florida
- County: Martin

Area
  - Total: 8.19 sq mi (21.20 km^{2})
  - Land: 6.97 sq mi (18.06 km^{2})
  - Water: 1.21 sq mi (3.14 km^{2})
- Elevation: 7 ft (2.1 m)

Population (2020)
  - Total: 12,652
  - Density: 1,815/sq mi (700.6/km^{2})
- Time zone: UTC-5 (Eastern (EST))
  - Summer (DST): UTC-4 (EDT)
- ZIP codes: 34957-34958
- Area code: 772
- FIPS code: 12-35550
- GNIS feature ID: 2402633

Jensen Beach is an unincorporated community and census-designated place (CDP) in Martin County, Florida, United States. The population was 12,652 at the 2020 census. It is part of the Port St. Lucie, Florida Metropolitan Statistical Area.

== History ==
The history of Jensen Beach in the 19th century revolved around pineapple farming. John Laurence Jensen, an immigrant from Denmark, arrived in 1881, and set up his pineapple plantation, which became the town of Jensen.

By 1894, the Florida East Coast Railway reached Jensen Beach, and freight shipments were loaded directly onto the freight cars.

By 1895, Jensen was called the "Pineapple Capital of the World", shipping over one million boxes of pineapples each year during the June and July season. To help handle the increased pineapple production, a pineapple factory was built, but a hard freeze in 1895 devastated most of the small pineapple plantations. Two fires, in 1908 and 1910, destroyed most of Jensen Beach and its remaining pineapple farms. The industry finally collapsed in 1920 due to a wide variety of financial and agriculture problems. Growers decided to turn their efforts in another direction: raising citrus fruits. The pineapple has become a symbol of Jensen Beach. The fruit legacy is celebrated annually during the Jensen Beach Pineapple Festival.

Jensen Beach was incorporated as "Jensen" in 1926 during the Florida Land Boom, but was dissolved seven years later by the State of Florida in 1933 following the onset of the Great Depression. The town's name was officially changed to "Jensen Beach" by Martin County in 1943.

In the second half of the 1900s, Saint Joseph College of Florida and later the Florida Institute of Technology both located on the Mansion at Tuckahoe premises in Jensen Beach.

In 2004 Jensen Beach was hit by two hurricanes. On September 5, 2004, Hurricane Frances made landfall at Hutchinson Island with winds of 105 miles per hour (169 km/h). On September 25, 2004, Hurricane Jeanne made landfall on Hutchinson Island with winds of 120 miles per hour (190 km/h).

== Geography and climate ==
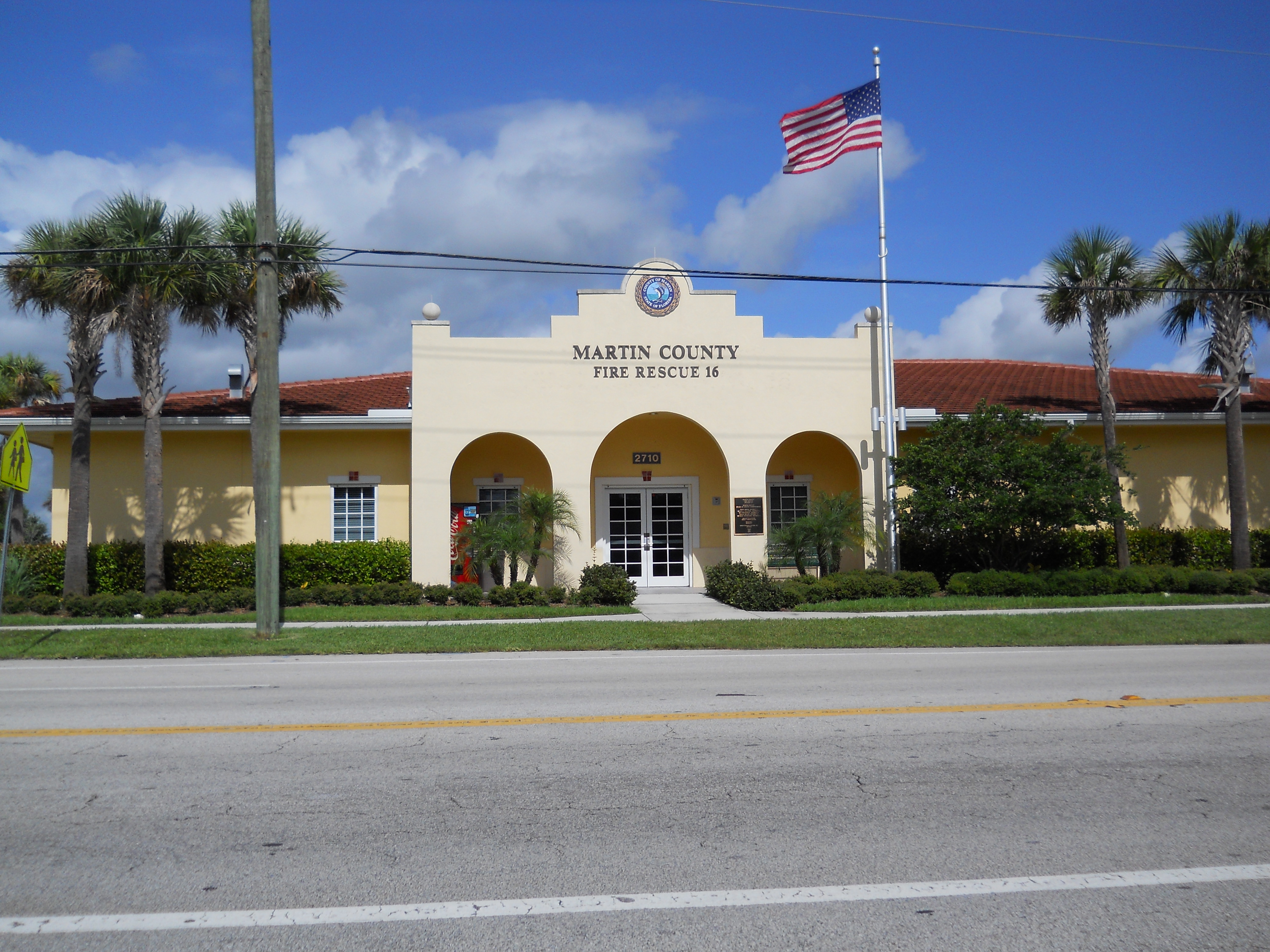
Fire Rescue Station 16 on Savanna Road serves Jensen Beach.

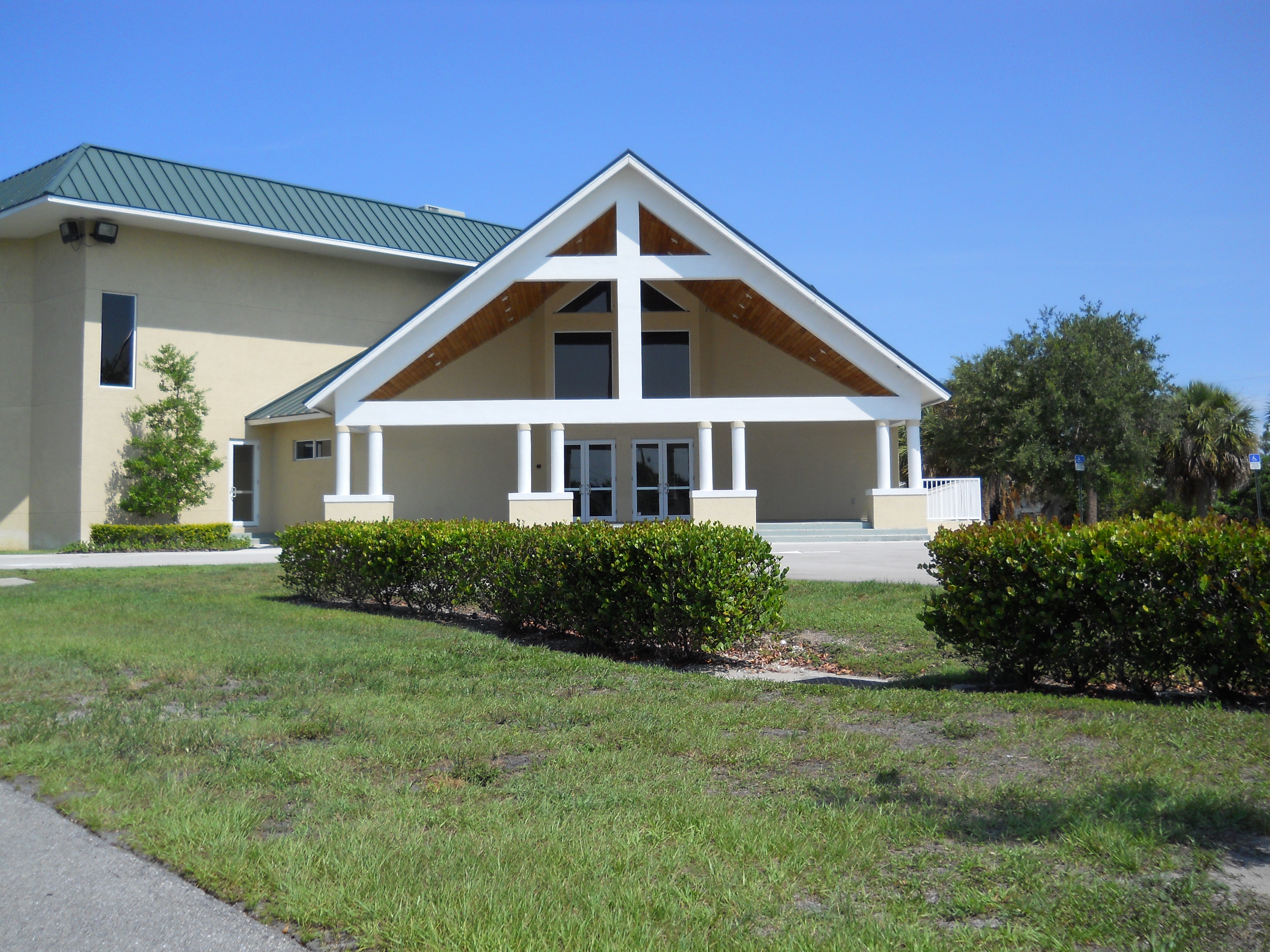
Family Church Jensen Beach

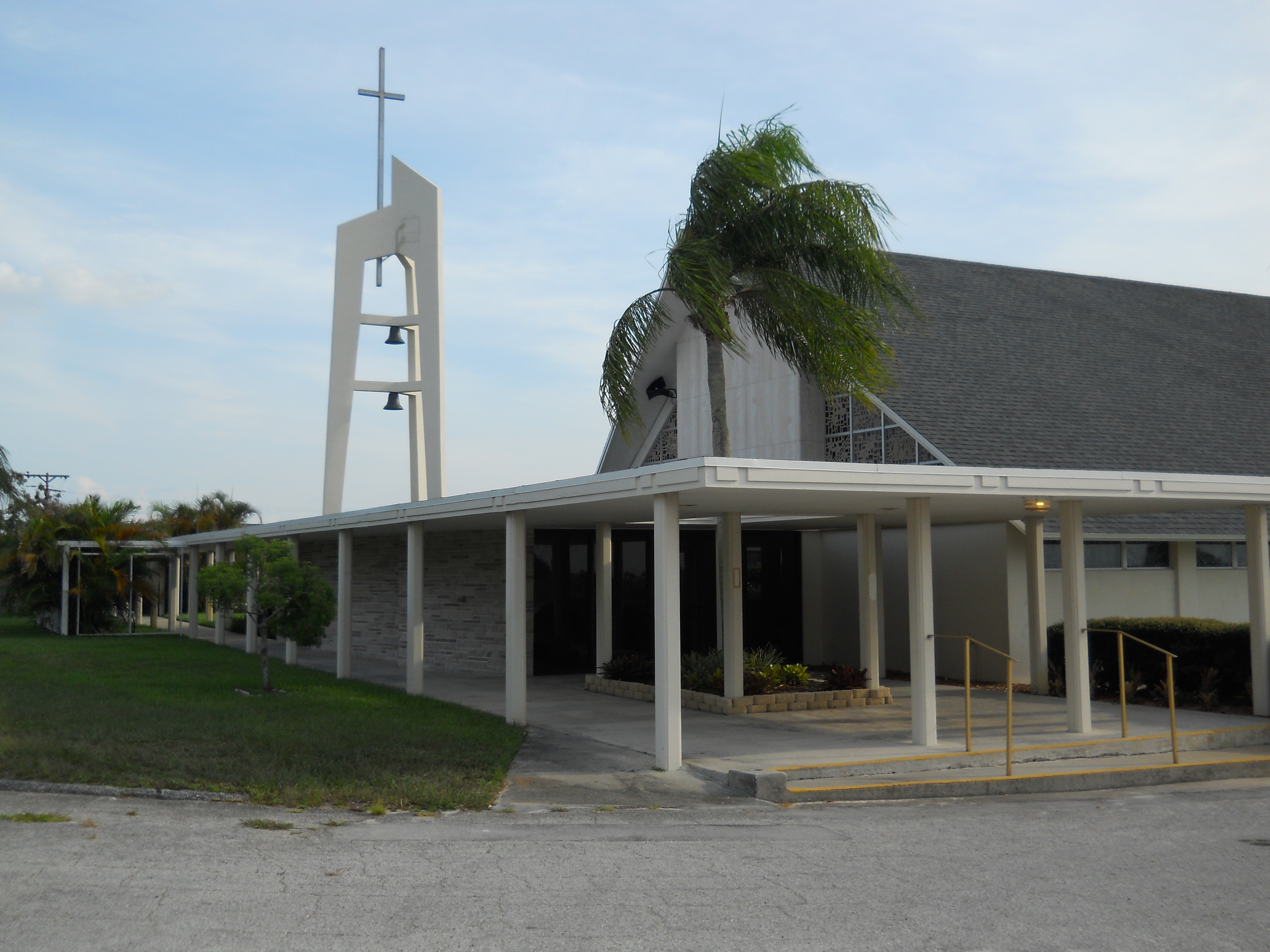
Jensen Beach Community Church

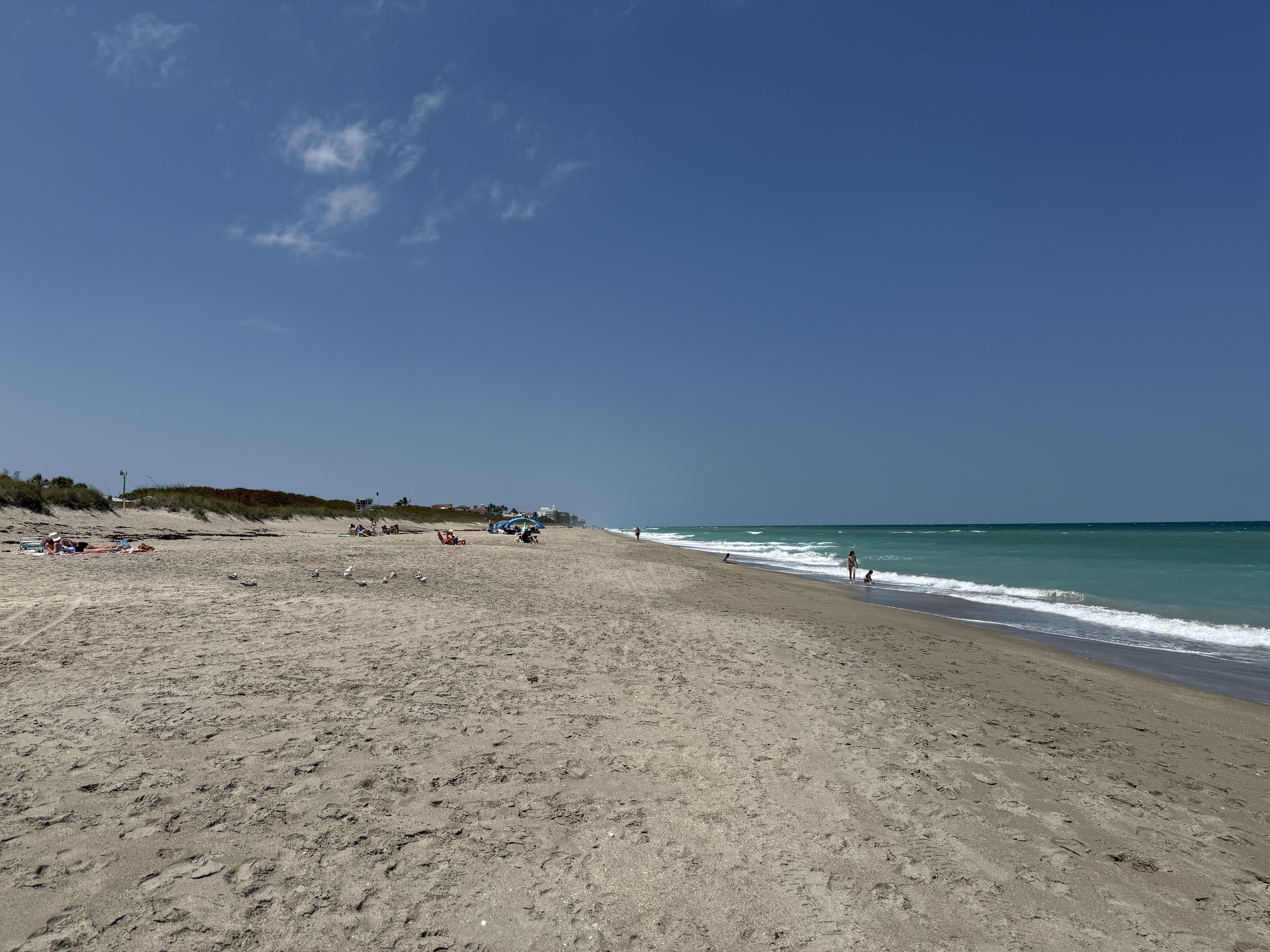
Jensen Sea Turtle Beach

Jensen Beach occupies the northeast corner of Martin County. It is bordered to the east by the Indian River Lagoon and the town of Ocean Breeze, to the southeast by the town of Sewall's Point, to the south by unincorporated Rio, to the southwest by the city of Stuart, the Martin county seat, to the northwest by U.S. Route 1, and to the north by the city of Port St. Lucie in St. Lucie County. Unincorporated North River Shores is to the west of Jensen Beach, on the opposite side of US 1. According to the United States Census Bureau, the CDP has a total area of 8.2 square miles (21.2 km^{2}), of which 7.0 square miles (18.1 km^{2}) are land and 1.2 square miles (3.1 km^{2}), or 14.82%, are water.

Waveland was the original name for the area from Crossroads Hill (south of N.E. Center Street) south to the tip of Sewall's Point and west to Warner Creek.

"Jensen" originally meant the area immediately adjacent to modern-day downtown Jensen Beach.

Jensen Beach was rated the "Top Spot for Beach Volleyball" in 2008 by Prime Time Magazine, and is a part of Florida's Treasure Coast region, which derives its name from the ships that wrecked during the 17th century because of coral reefs in the shallow waters. Artifacts and treasures from these ships of Spanish origin can still be discovered today.

The Skyline Drive area includes some of the highest points in the community, reaching an elevation of 70 feet (21 m) at one point.

The climate in the area is characterized by hot, humid summers and generally mild to somewhat cool winters, with occasional frosts. According to the Köppen Climate Classification system, Jensen Beach has a humid subtropical climate, abbreviated "Cfa" on climate maps, transitioning to a tropical monsoon or tropical rainforest climate.

== Government ==
Jensen Beach is an unincorporated town in Martin County. Jensen Beach is currently represented by Doug Smith as part of Martin County District 1.

The Jensen Beach Neighborhood Advisory Committee is composed of appointed Jensen Beach residents and business owners and formally advises the Martin County Community Redevelopment Agency regarding planning matters in the area.

== Demographics ==
Historical population
| Census | Pop. | Note | %± |
|---|---|---|---|
| 2000 | 11,100 | | — |
| 2010 | 11,707 | | 5.5% |
| 2020 | 12,652 | | 8.1% |
U.S. Decennial Census

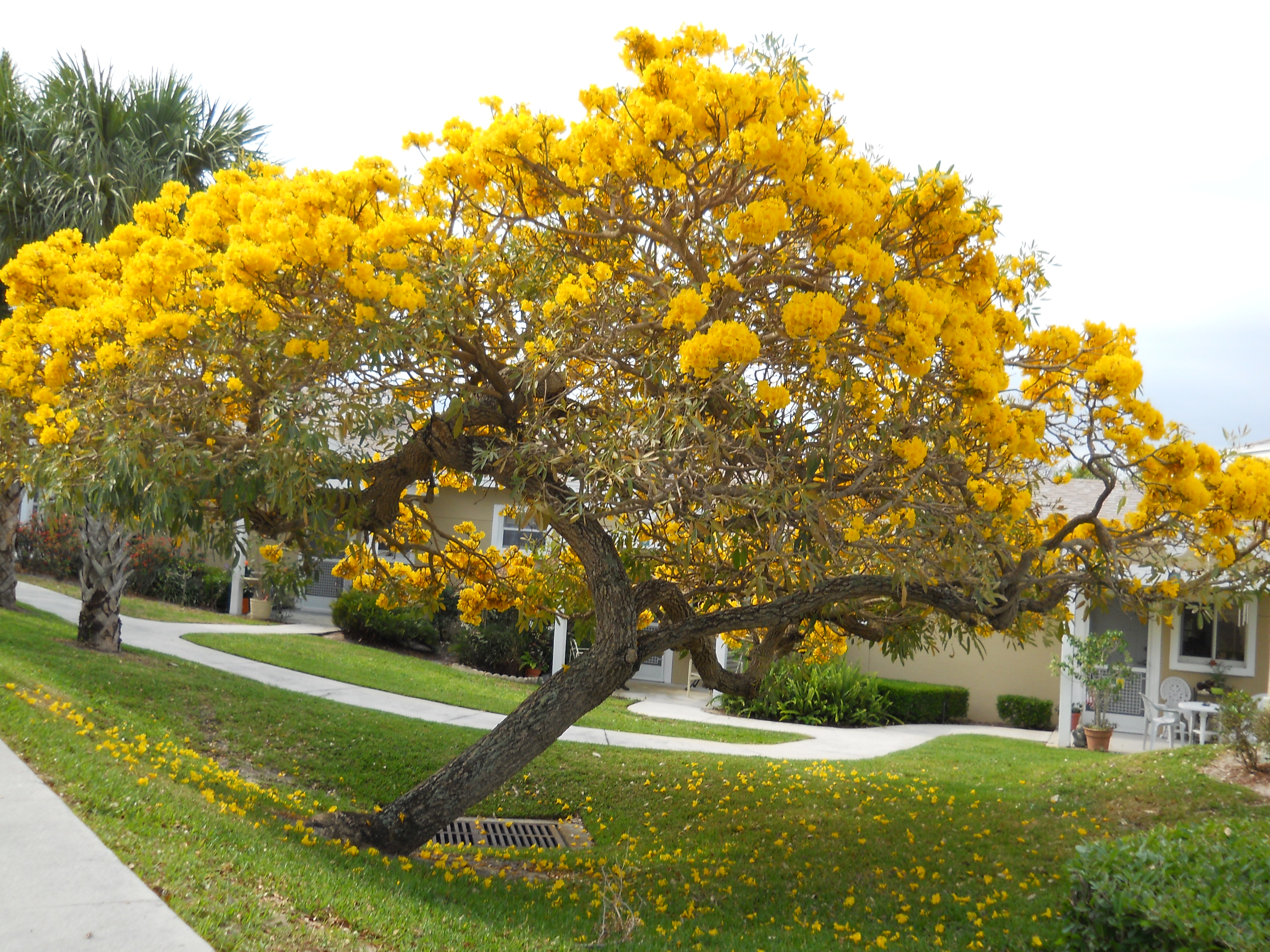
Tabebuia off Savanna Road in Jensen Beach, April 2010, typical of such trees blooming throughout Martin County in the spring

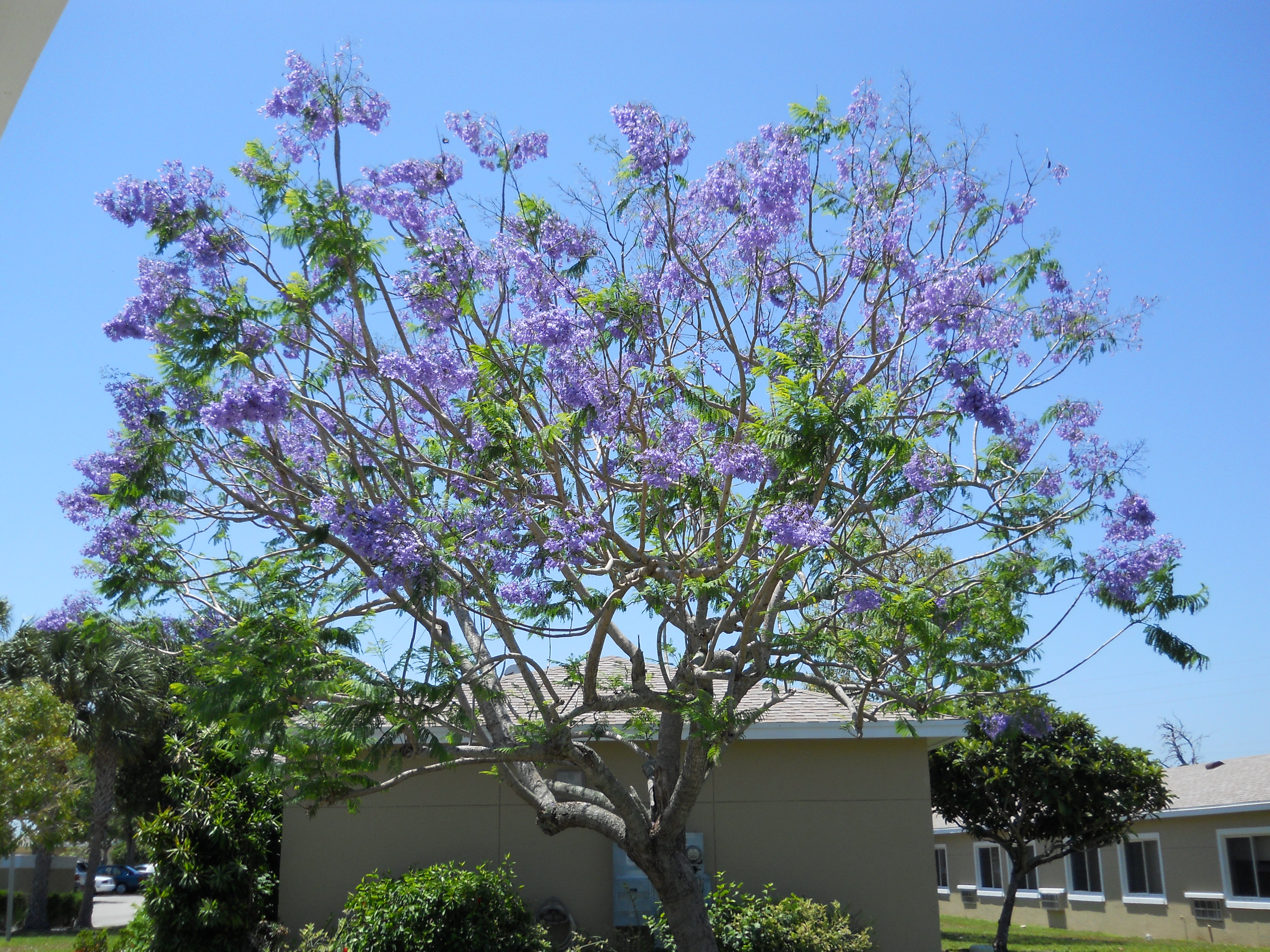
Jacaranda off Savanna Road in Jensen Beach, May 2010.

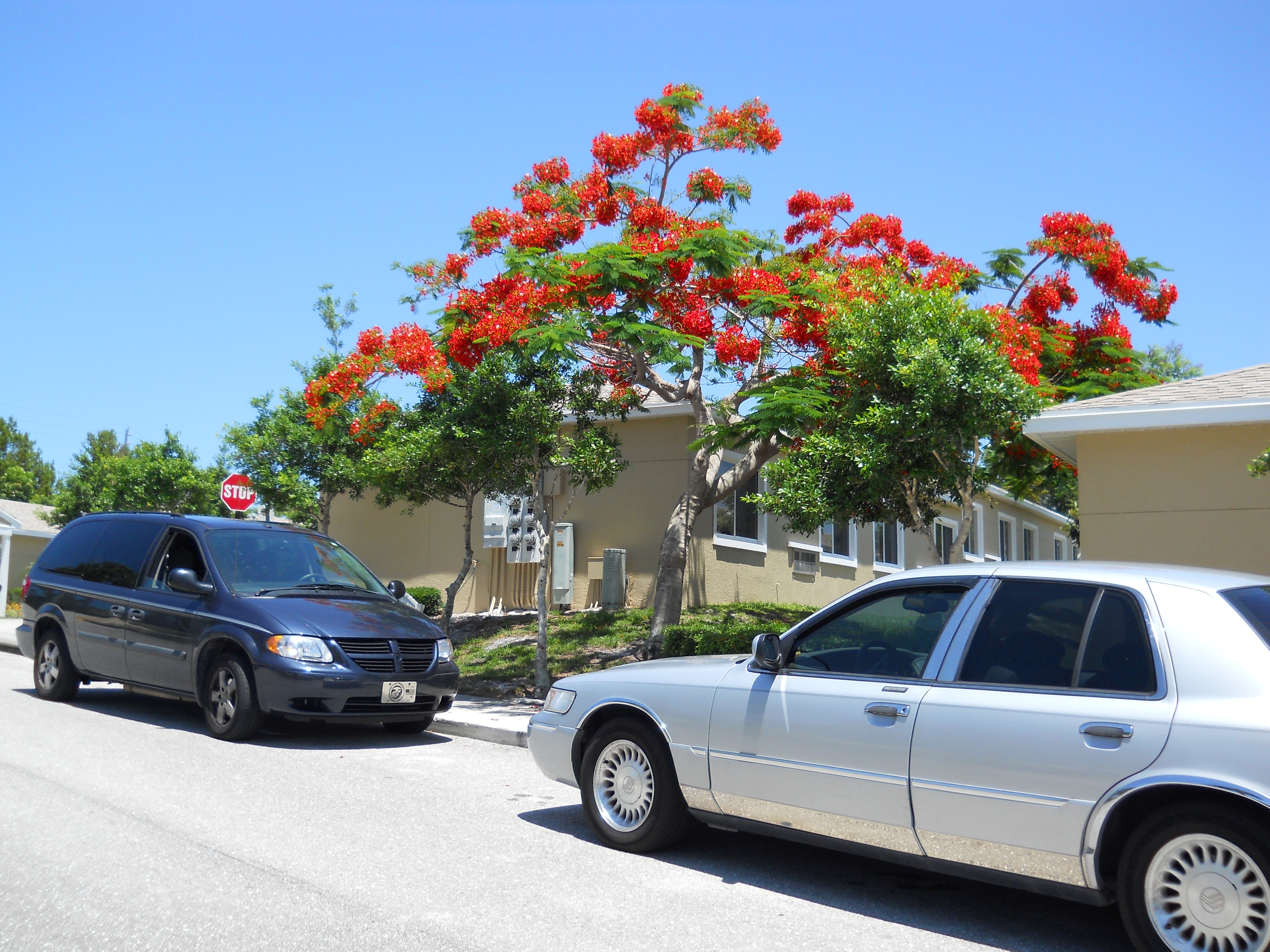
Royal Poinciana off Savanna Road in Jensen Beach, May 2010.

=== 2020 census ===
As of the 2020 census, Jensen Beach had a population of 12,652. There were 3,038 families residing in the CDP.

The median age was 55.2 years. 14.5% of residents were under the age of 18 and 32.1% of residents were 65 years of age or older. For every 100 females there were 92.8 males, and for every 100 females age 18 and over there were 91.3 males age 18 and over.

100.0% of residents lived in urban areas, while 0.0% lived in rural areas.

There were 6,097 households in Jensen Beach, of which 17.7% had children under the age of 18 living in them. Of all households, 43.2% were married-couple households, 19.9% were households with a male householder and no spouse or partner present, and 30.7% were households with a female householder and no spouse or partner present. About 36.9% of all households were made up of individuals and 22.3% had someone living alone who was 65 years of age or older.

There were 7,089 housing units, of which 14.0% were vacant. The homeowner vacancy rate was 2.7% and the rental vacancy rate was 12.1%.

Jensen Beach racial composition (Hispanics excluded from racial categories) (NH = Non-Hispanic)
| Race | Number | Percentage |
|---|---|---|
| White (NH) | 10,984 | 86.82% |
| Black or African American (NH) | 207 | 1.64% |
| Native American or Alaska Native (NH) | 17 | 0.13% |
| Asian (NH) | 136 | 1.07% |
| Some Other Race (NH) | 64 | 0.51% |
| Mixed/Multi-Racial (NH) | 418 | 3.3% |
| Hispanic or Latino | 826 | 6.53% |
| Total | 12,652 | |

=== 2000 census ===
As of the census of 2000, there were 11,100 people, 5,059 households, and 3,025 families residing in the CDP. The population density was 1,531.8 per square mile (591.4/km^{2}). There were 5,805 housing units at an average density of 801.1 per square mile (309.3/km^{2}). The racial makeup of the CDP was 95.80% White, 2.25% African American, 0.22% Native American, 0.47% Asian, 0.04% Pacific Islander, 0.37% from other races, and 0.86% from two or more races. Hispanic or Latino of any race were 2.77% of the population.

There were 5,059 households, out of which 23.8% had children under the age of 18 living with them, 47.2% were married couples living together, 8.8% had a female householder with no husband present, and 40.2% were non-families. 33.2% of all households were made up of individuals, and 17.6% had someone living alone who was 65 years of age or older. The average household size was 2.19 and the average family size was 2.78.

20.0% of the population was under the age of 18, 5.4% from 18 to 24, 25.4% from 25 to 44, 25.3% from 45 to 64, and 23.8% were 65 or older. The median age was 44 years. For every 100 females, there were 94.2 males. For every 100 females age 18 and over, there were 89.7 males.

The median income for a household in the CDP was $36,674, and the median income for a family was $49,787. Males had a median income of $34,368 versus $25,118 for females. The per capita income for the CDP was $22,921. 8.3% of the population and 5.0% of families were below the poverty line. 8.4% of those under the age of 18 and 7.4% of those 65 and older were living below the poverty line.

== Recreation ==
The main public beach in Jensen Beach is on Hutchinson Island and is called Jensen Sea Turtle Beach. It is a wide sandy beach on the Atlantic Ocean. Martin County life guards are in attendance. The beach is used for sun bathing, surfing, fishing and swimming.

== Ecology ==
Designated sections of the Jensen Sea Turtle Beach are barricaded off in order to protect the nests of the sea turtles. The three species found on this beach are the loggerhead, leatherback turtle and green sea turtle. Loggerhead nests are the most common type found on this and adjacent beaches. Locations of the sea turtles' nests are marked with the approximate date in which the eggs were laid and the expected date in which the eggs will hatch. These notifications are meant to discourage tourists and residents from visiting the beach in the evening hours during these time periods. Efforts are made to protect both species of sea turtles since nests have been declining in recent years due to the severe erosion of the beach.

== Economics ==
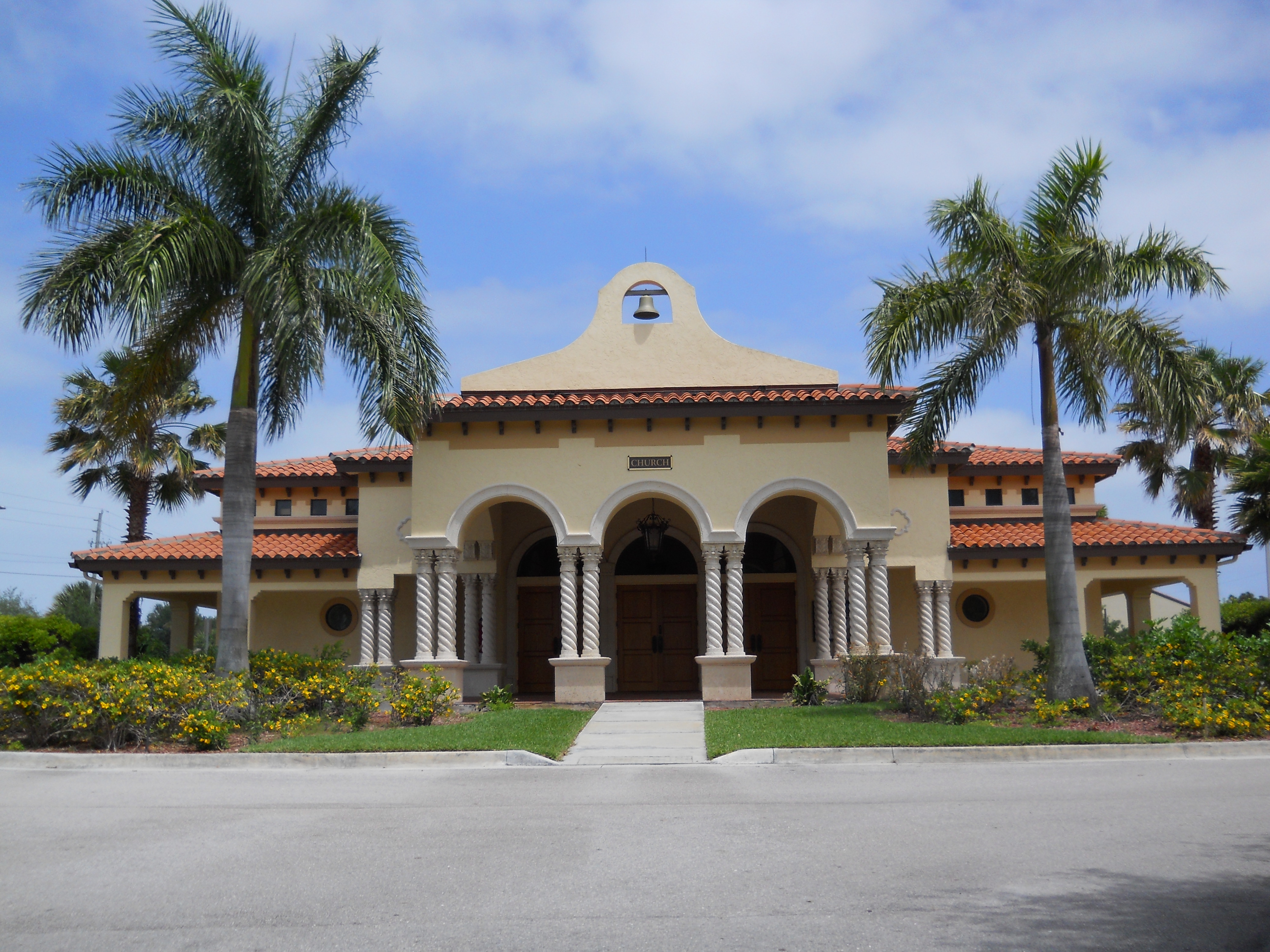
St. Martin de Porres Catholic Church in Jensen Beach

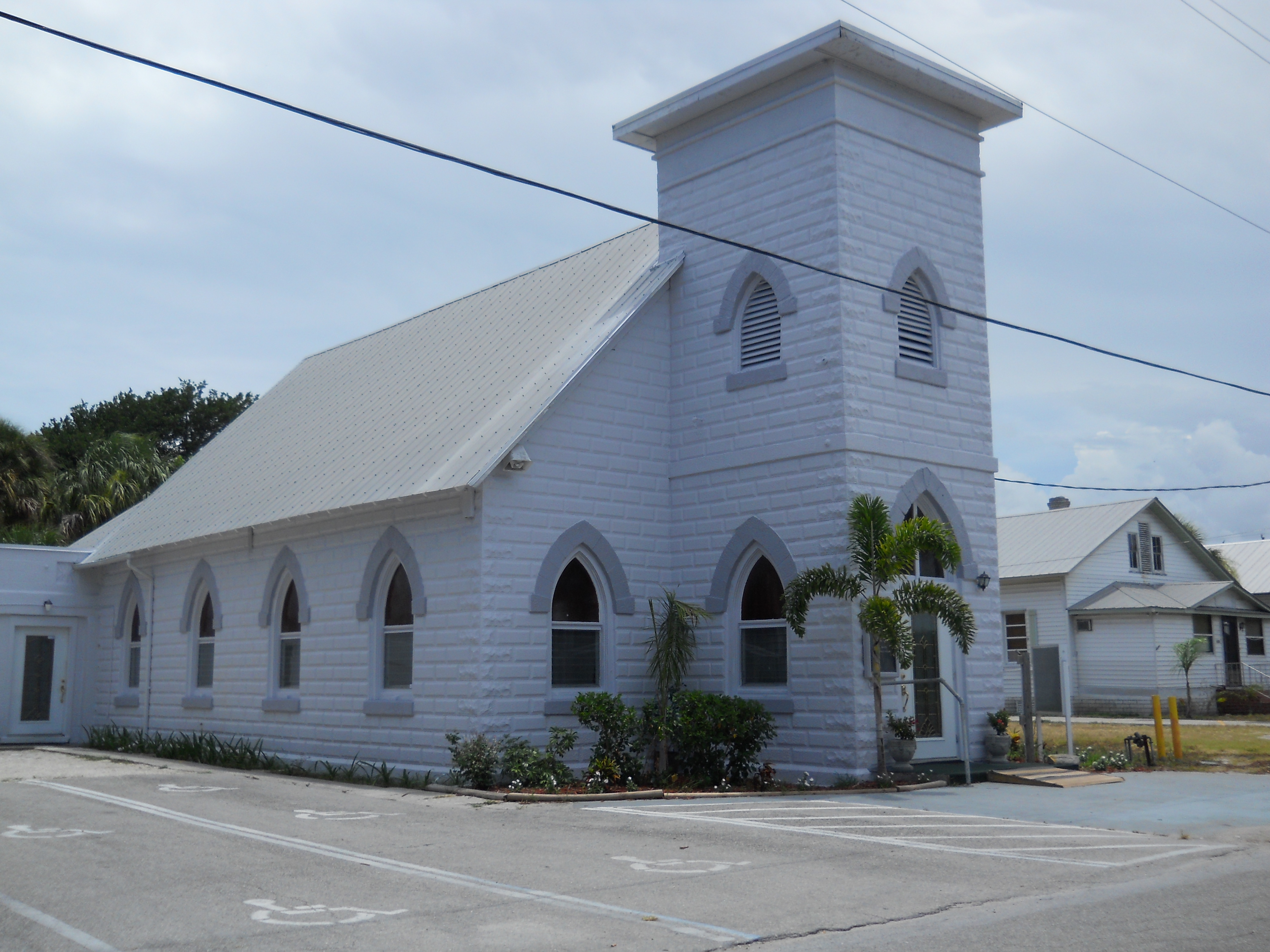
Jensen Beach Christian Church in downtown Jensen

Downtown Jensen Beach is the site of the annual Pineapple Festival.

== Education ==
- Jensen Beach High School
- Jensen Beach Elementary
- Felix A. Williams Elementary
- The Environmental Studies Center
- Stuart Middle School

== Media ==
As of September 10, 2010, Jensen Beach once again has its own newspaper, the free Pineapple Post.

== Historic landmarks ==
Historic landmarks in Jensen Beach include:

- All Saints Episcopal Church erected in 1898 is the oldest church building in Jensen Beach as well as in Martin County. Adjacent to the church is All Saints Cemetery which is non-sectarian and serves the whole community.
- Capt. John Miller House (private) on Indian River Drive in Eden, built by an early settler in the late 1890s
- Jensen Beach Christian Church built in 1910-1912
- Capt. Henry E. Sewall House, now located in Indian Riverside Park
- The Mansion at Tuckahoe in Indian Riverside Park
- Mount Elizabeth Archeological Site in Indian Riverside Park
- Stuart Welcome Arch, on County Road 707

== Sister cities ==
Jensen Beach has been the sister city of Gregory Town in the Bahamas since July 1989.

== Notable people ==
- Ralph Evinrude, CEO of Outboard Motor Company with a test facility in Stuart; retired to Jensen Beach
- Derek Fathauer, PGA golfer
- Forest K. Ferguson, World War II recipient of Distinguished Service Cross
- Paul C. Genereux, US Army brigadier general
- Frances Langford, singer and entertainer
- Bobby Lord, country singer
- Anthony Newley, British songwriter and actor
- Scott Proctor, baseball pitcher
- Jennifer Sky (born Jennifer Kathleen Wacha), actress
