= Ocean Breeze, Florida =

Town in the state of Florida, United States

- Town
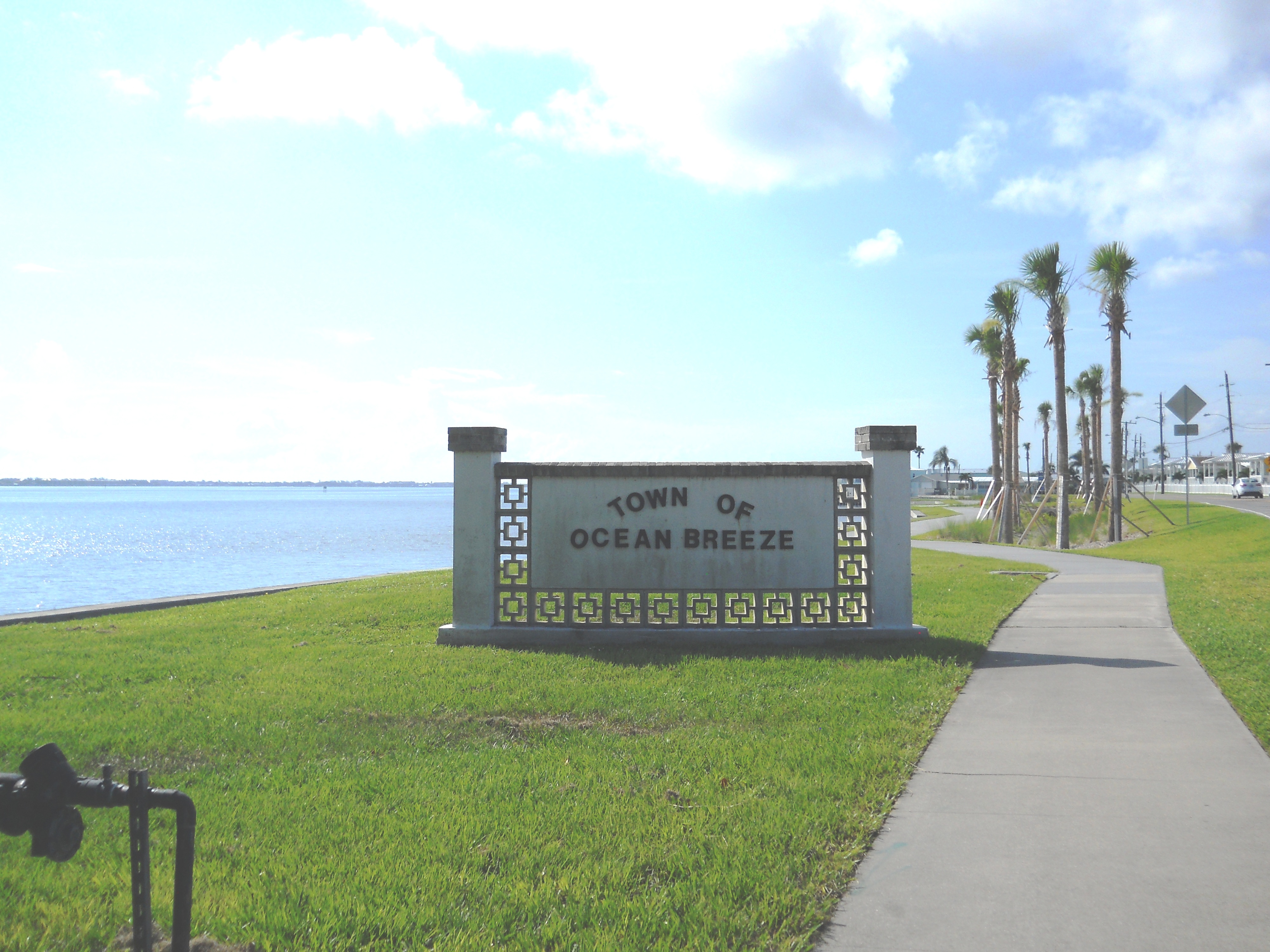
- A welcome marker at the entrance for the Town of Ocean Breeze

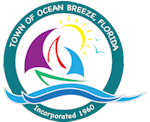
- Seal

- Location in Martin County and the state of Florida
- Coordinates: 27°14′28″N 80°13′33″W
- Country: United States
- State: Florida
- County: Martin
- Founded (Ocean Breeze Trailer Park): 1938
- Incorporated (Town of Ocean Breeze Park): 1960
- Reincorporated (Town of Ocean Breeze): December 18, 2013

Government
  - Type: Council-Manager
  - Mayor: Karen M. Ostrand
  - Council President: Kevin Docherty
  - Council Members: Janet Galante, Matthew Squires, Michael Heller, George Ciaschi, and Council Vice President Sandy Keblbeck-Kelley
  - Town Clerk: Pamela "Pam" Orr
  - Town Attorney: Gemma Torcivia

Area
  - Total: 0.21 sq mi (0.54 km^{2})
  - Land: 0.17 sq mi (0.43 km^{2})
  - Water: 0.042 sq mi (0.11 km^{2})
- Elevation: 16 ft (4.9 m)

Population (2020)
  - Total: 301
  - Density: 1,823.3/sq mi (703.98/km^{2})
- Time zone: UTC-5 (Eastern (EST))
  - Summer (DST): UTC-4 (EDT)
- ZIP Code: 34957
- Area code: 772
- FIPS code: 12-50900
- GNIS feature ID: 2407031
- Website: townofoceanbreeze.com

Ocean Breeze, formerly Ocean Breeze Park, is a town on the Indian River in Martin County, Florida, United States. Ocean Breeze and Briny Breezes in Palm Beach County are the only two towns in Florida in which all residents live in a mobile home park bearing the name of the town. The population was 301 at the 2020 census. The population figures do not include the many part-time winter residents from other places. The town is bordered on three sides by the unincorporated community of Jensen Beach.

Ocean Breeze is part of the Port St. Lucie Metropolitan Statistical Area, which includes all of Martin and St. Lucie counties.

== History ==
In 1938, the community was established in a coastal area north of Stuart, Florida, by Harry Hoke, who later became Ocean Breeze's first mayor.

The town government was formed in 1960, when 142 property owners from the Ocean Breeze Trailer Park voted to incorporate as the Town of Ocean Breeze Park. Harry Hoke was elected as the town's first mayor. Evans Crary Sr., who guided the town through the legal procedure of incorporation, was appointed town attorney. At the time of its incorporation, the 65-acre park was said to be the largest privately owned trailer park in the United States. By referendum held December 18, 2013, it changed its name to the "Town of Ocean Breeze".

=== Mayors ===
The history of mayors, from the founder and his family members being mayors, to the current mayor:

- Harry Hoke (1960–1972)
- Gene Hoke (1973–1989)
- Ruth Hoke (1989–2001)
- Dorothy Geeben (2001–2010)
- David W. Myers (2010–2016)
- Karen M. Ostrand (2017-Present)

Dorothy Geeben, mayor from 2001 to 2010, was re-elected in 2004 at age 96, and was identified as the United States' oldest mayor. Mayor Geeben died on January 11, 2010, at the age of 101 just short of her 102nd birthday. The current mayor is Karen M. Ostrand (2017–present).

== Geography ==
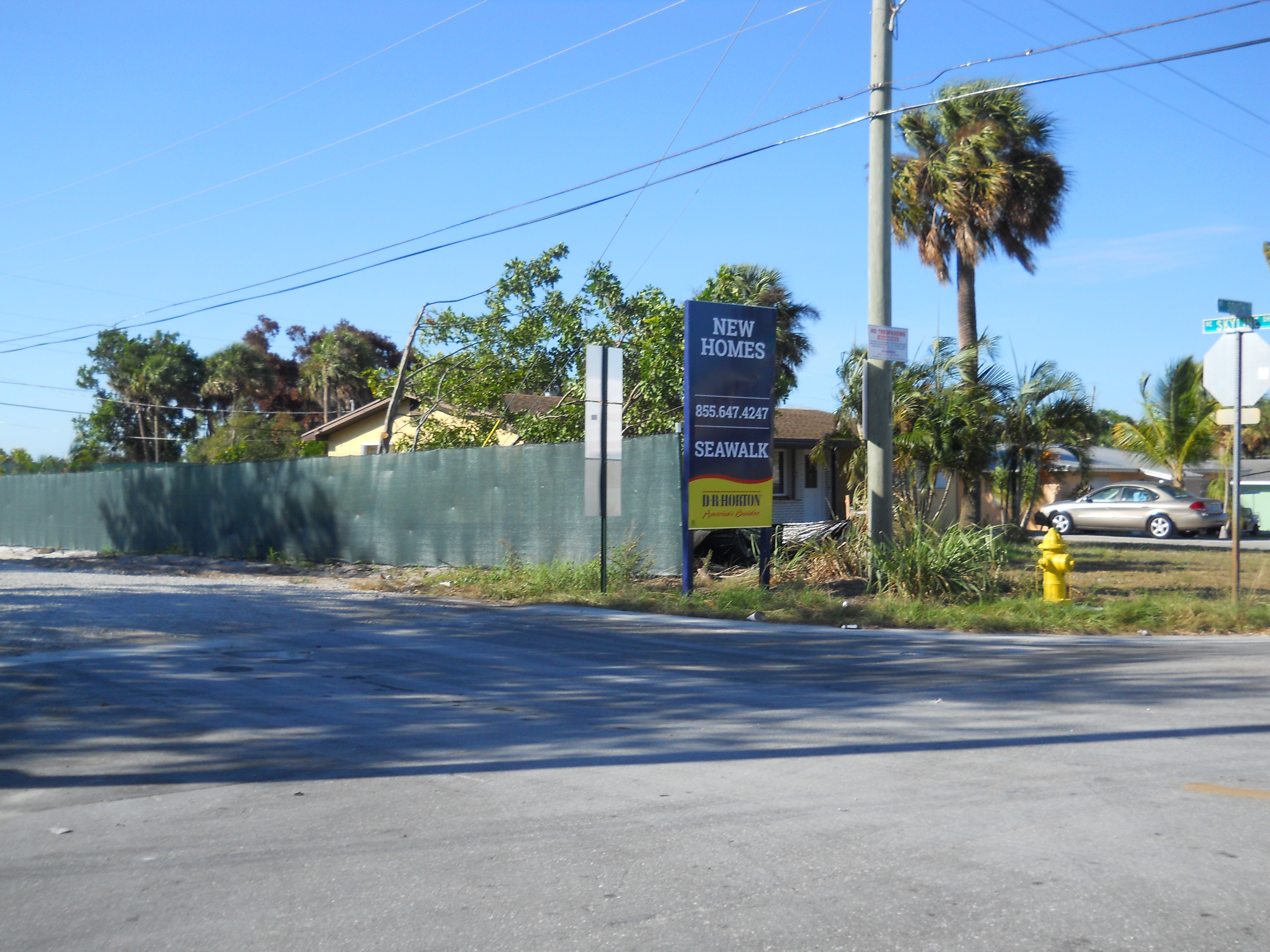
Entrance to new residential area

The town's location is on the northeastern tip of Martin County and is 5 miles (8 km) by road northeast of Stuart, the county seat, and 15 miles (24 km) south-southeast of Fort Pierce. According to the United States Census Bureau, the town has a total area of 0.2 square miles (0.52 km^{2}), of which 0.04 square miles (0.10 km^{2}), or 21.05%, are water.

The town is bounded on the east by the Indian River and on the south, west and north by the unincorporated community of Jensen Beach.

=== Layout ===
The town consists of three sections:

- "Ocean Breeze RV Resort (Sun Communities)", where residents live
- A shopping center, "Ocean Breeze Plaza", anchored by a Publix supermarket
- An undeveloped area of high sugar sand dunes

All roads within the town are private, connecting to CR 707. The town is served by the Jensen Beach post office.

== Demographics ==
Historical population
Census	Pop.	Note	%±
1970	714		—
1980	466		−34.7%
1990	519		11.4%
2000	463		−10.8%
2010	355		−23.3%
2020	301		−15.2%
U.S. Decennial Census

=== 2010 and 2020 census ===
Ocean Breeze racial composition (Hispanics excluded from racial categories) (NH = Non-Hispanic)
Race	Pop 2010	Pop 2020	% 2010	% 2020
White (NH)	346	278	97.46%	92.36%
Black or African American (NH)	1	5	0.28%	1.66%
Native American or Alaska Native (NH)	1	0	0.28%	0.00%
Asian (NH)	0	5	0.00%	1.66%
Pacific Islander or Native Hawaiian (NH)	1	0	0.28%	0.00%
Some other race (NH)	0	2	0.00%	0.66%
Two or more races/Multiracial (NH)	1	7	0.28%	2.33%
Hispanic or Latino (any race)	5	4	1.41%	1.33%
Total	355	301		

As of the 2020 United States census, there were 301 people, 147 households, and 86 families residing in the town.

As of the 2010 United States census, there were 355 people, 305 households, and 66 families residing in the town.

=== 2000 census ===
As of the census of 2000, there were 463 people, 335 households, and 107 families residing in the town. The population density was 2,706.5 inhabitants per square mile (1,045.0/km^{2}). There were 579 housing units at an average density of 3,384.6 per square mile (1,306.8/km^{2}). The racial makeup of the town was 98.49% White, 1.08% African American, and 0.43% from two or more races. Hispanic or Latino of any race were 1.08% of the population.

In 2000, there were 335 households, out of which 0.3% had children under the age of 18 living with them, 26.9% were married couples living together, 4.8% had a female householder with no husband present, and 67.8% were non-families. 63.6% of all households were made up of individuals, and 43.9% had someone living alone who was 65 years of age or older. The average household size was 1.38 and the average family size was 2.05.

In 2000, in the town, the population was spread out, with 0.2% under the age of 18, 0.4% from 18 to 24, 5.4% from 25 to 44, 27.4% from 45 to 64, and 66.5% who were 65 years of age or older. The median age was 70 years. For every 100 females, there were 83.0 males. For every 100 females age 18 and over, there were 83.3 males.

In 2000, the median income for a household in the town was $15,709, and the median income for a family was $27,813. Males had a median income of $17,083 versus $25,208 for females. The per capita income for the town was $19,802, which ranks it 418 out of 887 towns in Florida. About 14.6% of families and 15.3% of the population were below the poverty line, including none of those under age 18 and 12.7% of those age 65 or over.
