= All Saints Episcopal Church, Waveland (Jensen Beach, Florida) =

Church in Jensen Beach, Florida

Coordinates: 27.231069°N 80.220151°W

All Saints Episcopal Church, Jensen Beach, FL (Waveland)
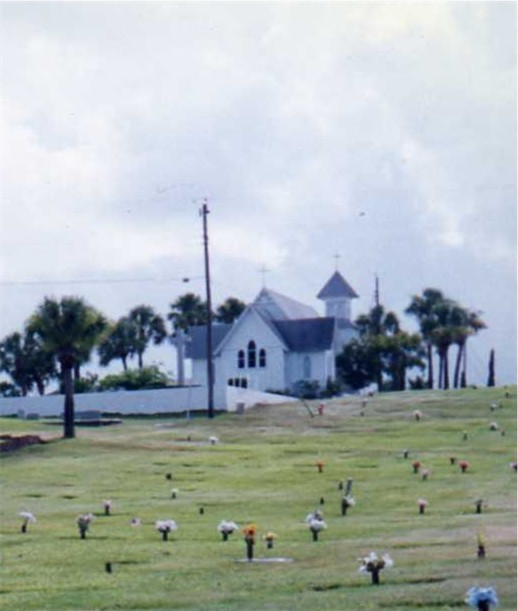
- All Saints Episcopal Church, Jensen Beach, FL (Waveland)
- Denomination: Episcopal
- Churchmanship: High church

History
- Dedication: All Saints

Administration
- Province: IV
- Diocese: Southeast Florida; Peter D Eaton, Bishop
- Deanery: North Palm Beach Deanery
- Parish: All Saints

Clergy
- Rector: The Reverend Dr. Anthony B. Holder

All Saints' Episcopal Church, Jensen Beach (previously Waveland), is an historic Carpenter Gothic church built in 1898 on Crossroads Hill in Waveland, now part of Jensen Beach, Florida. It is the oldest church building located in what is now Martin County, Florida. It is also the northernmost parish in the present-day Episcopal Diocese of Southeast Florida. When built, the church was located in Brevard County. From 1910-25, it was in St. Lucie County. Since 1925, it has been in Martin County. The Reverend Dr. Anthony B. Holder is the rector.

In 1963, the church building was moved a few 100 feet to a more prominent place (which now has the address of 2377 N.E. Patrician Street) at the top of Crossroads Hill. A new rectory (now the parish offices) was built on the old location, with the address of 2303 N.E. Seaview Drive, which is now the church's mailing address. Since being moved, the church building has been added onto twice but care was taken to preserve its architectural integrity.

In 1989, All Saints Episcopal Church was listed in A Guide to Florida's Historic Architecture, published by the University of Florida Press.

All Saints Episcopal Church is also featured in the 2009 Historic Episcopal Churches Engagement Calendar published by the National Episcopal Historians and Archivists.

Not only is it the most northern church in the Diocese, but it is also at the highest elevation, at 34' above sea level.

== History of the parish ==
The first Episcopal church services in the Jensen Beach area were held on November 23, 1894, when William Crane Gray, missionary bishop of Southern Florida, came down the Indian River by boat to Eden and preached in the schoolhouse there. Later the same day, he walked down to Jensen and preached in the parlor of the Al Fresco Hotel. That simple beginning resulted in the formation of two parishes: St. Paul's in Walton north of Eden and All Saints' in Waveland south of Jensen.

== All Saints Cemetery ==
All Saints Cemetery, sometimes called Waveland Cemetery or All Saints Waveland Cemetery, is the only cemetery in Jensen Beach and is non-profit. Although the cemetery is affiliated with All Saints Church, it is non-sectarian and serves as the community's cemetery.

=== Old section ===
The old section runs from Dixie Highway, S.R. 707, west up the hill to the church property. Upright markers range from plain wooden ones (which are no longer legible) to elaborate granite and marble ones.

=== New section ===
The much larger new section abuts both the old section and the church property on their north sides, and runs from Dixie Highway up and over the hill to the Florida East Coast Railway tracks. Until recently, it was a lawn area and only allowed stone or bronze markers which are flush with the ground. Several upright markers have now been permitted in this area.

=== Mausoleums, cremation section and Serenity Gardens ===
Since the land, in both the old and new sections, that lies between the foot of the hill and Dixie Highway is too low for standard in-ground burials, it is now used for three mausoleums and a columbarium, a cremation section and the Serenity Gardens, which is also for cremated remains.

== Alleluia Cross and Outdoor Altar ==
The Georgia granite Alleluia Cross and Outdoor Altar are located 65 feet east of the eastern wall of the church on the west side of the parking lot overlooking the cemetery and Dixie Highway below and the Indian River to the east. They were given by Wallace E. Conkling (1896–1979), retired bishop of the Episcopal Diocese of Chicago, in memory of his wife, Constance Lillian (Sowby) Conkling, who died on March 9, 1969, and whose ashes were interred beneath the altar.

The east side of the cross is inscribed vertically "ALLELUIA", while the west side is inscribed "JESU MERCI" meaning "Thank You Jesus." Bishop Conkling was bishop in residence at All Saints' for many years and after he died on August 27, 1979, his ashes were also interred under the outdoor altar. The base of the cross is inscribed on the west side: "Wallace Edmonds Conkling / The Bishop of Chicago / 1941-53 / August 27, 1979 / Constance Sowby Conkling / his wife / March 9, 1969." The Diocese of Chicago gave money to All Saints' to provide for the care of Bishop Conkling's grave.

The parish's Easter Sunrise Services are held there each year at approximately 6:30 a.m. On November 2nd, The All Souls' Day Commemoration Service is held at approximately 5 p.m. This service blends the church and cemetery to commemorate all the faithful departed. Other services such as the Blessing of the Animals, Rogation Sunday and Stations of the Cross are held in the garden by the Alleluia Cross. The cross itself has a twin in the cemetery of St. Gregory's Abbey, Three Rivers, Michigan.

== Gallery ==
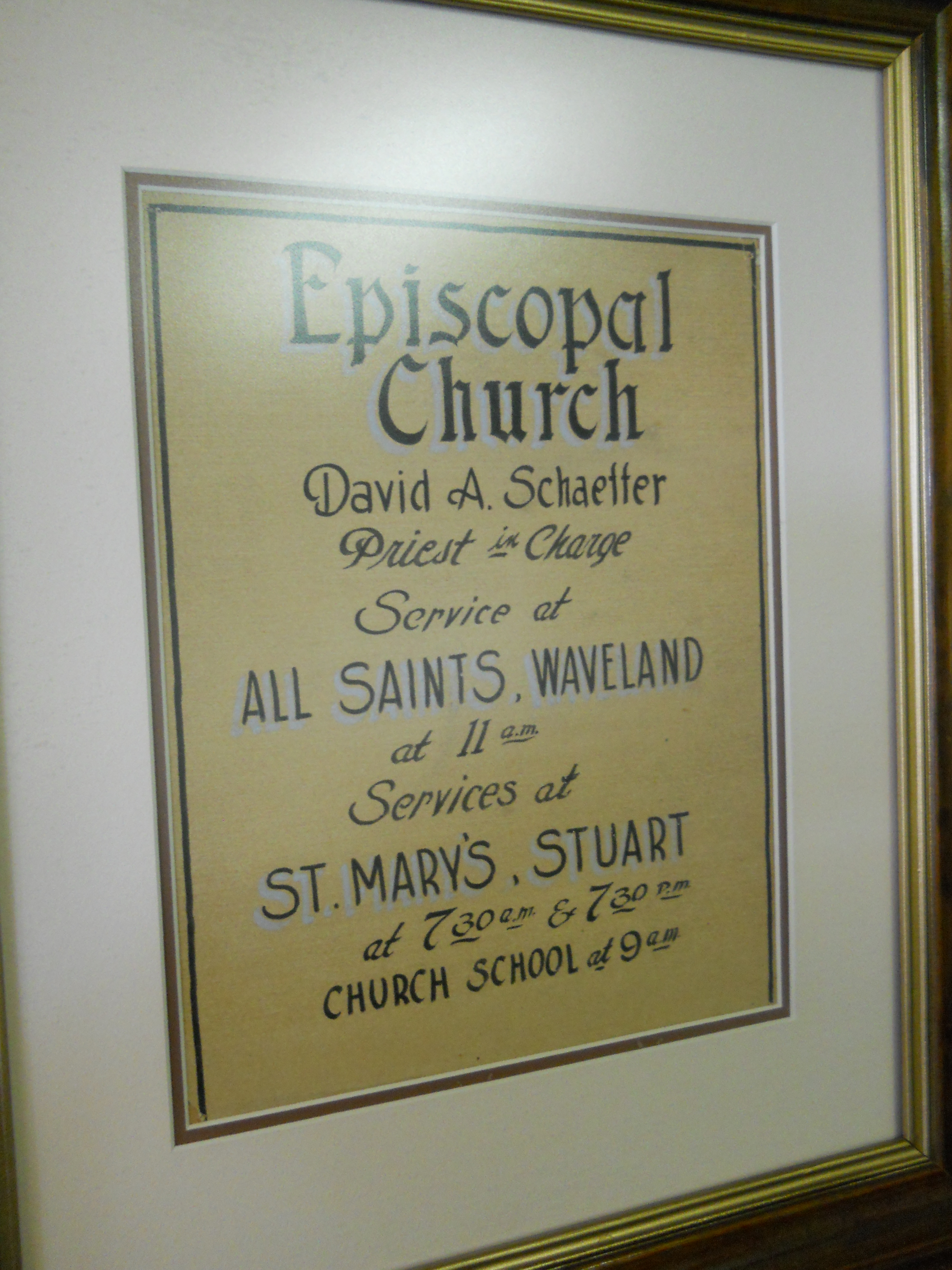
Poster from the 1930s advertising services

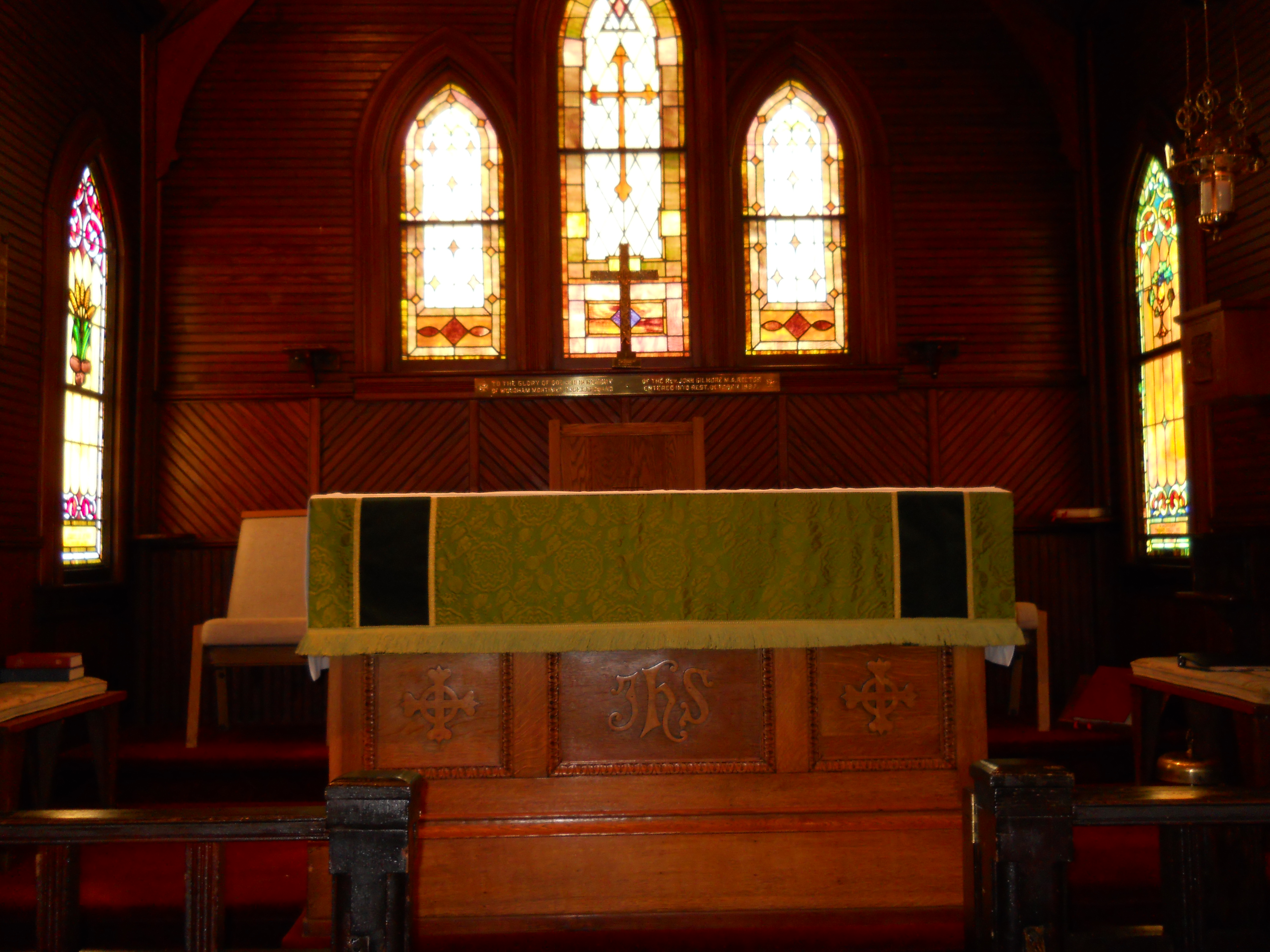
The sanctuary

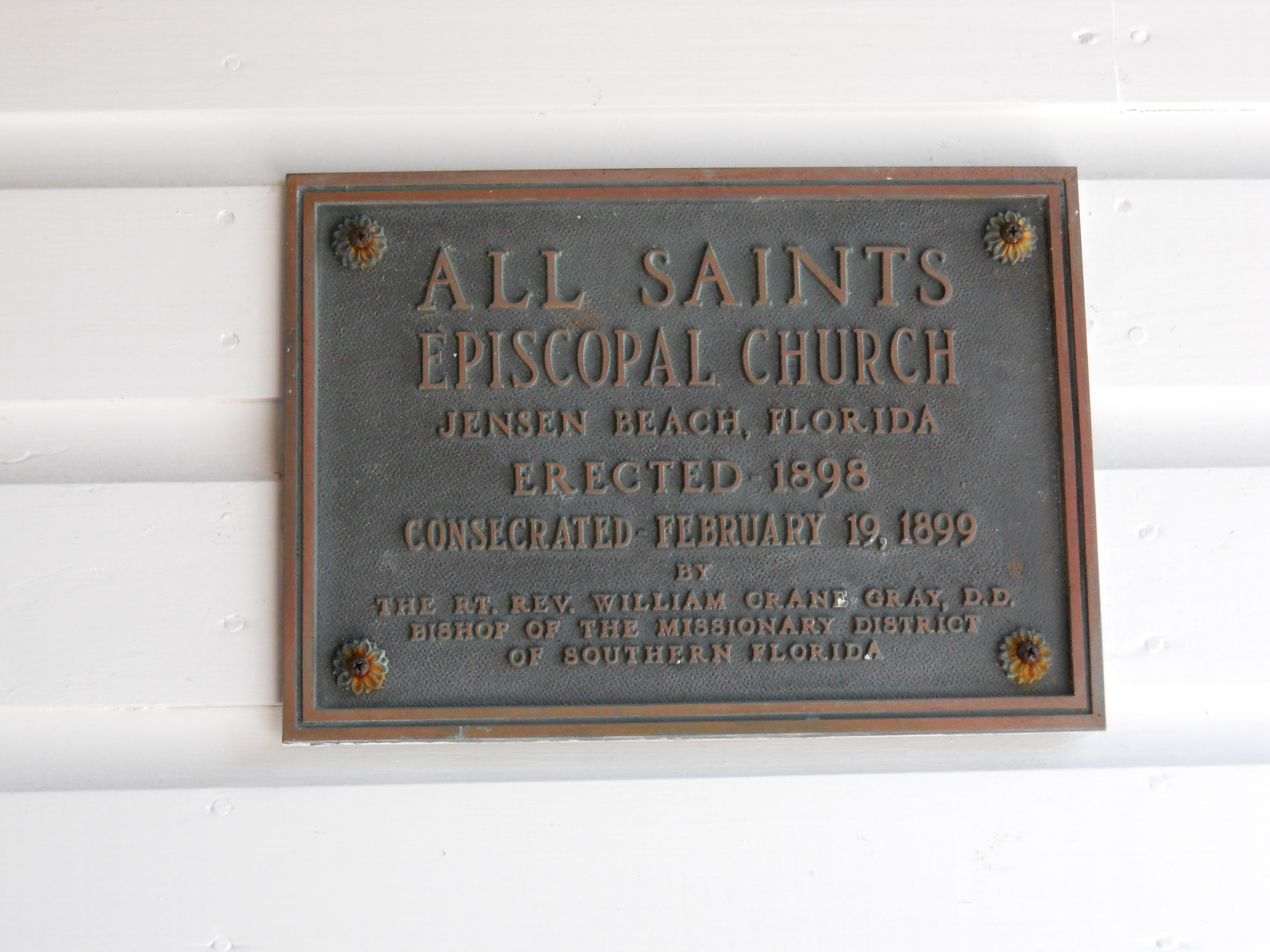
Erection and consecration plaque near main entrance

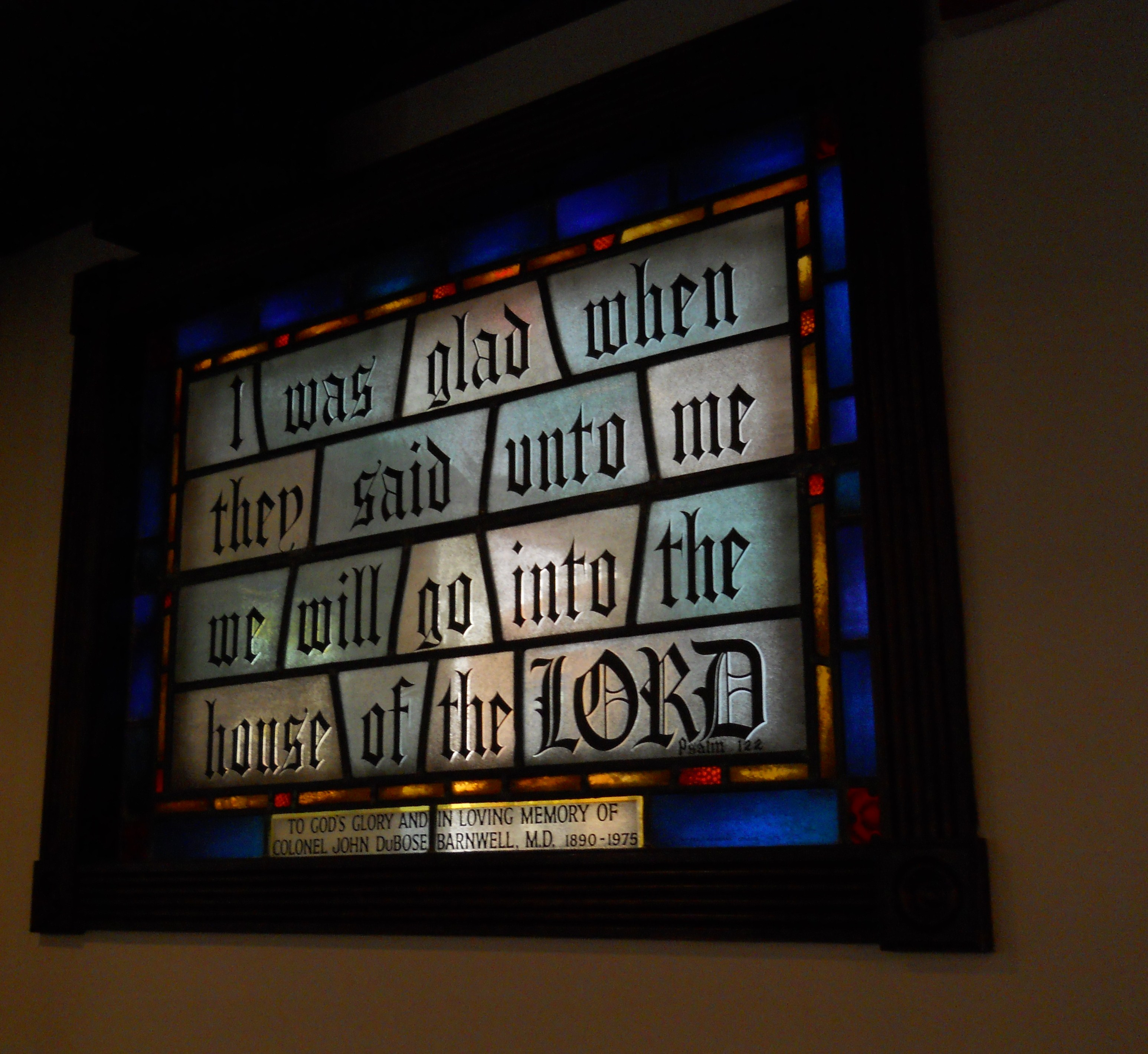
Barnwell memorial window, Psalm 122:1, between the expanded nave and the new narthex

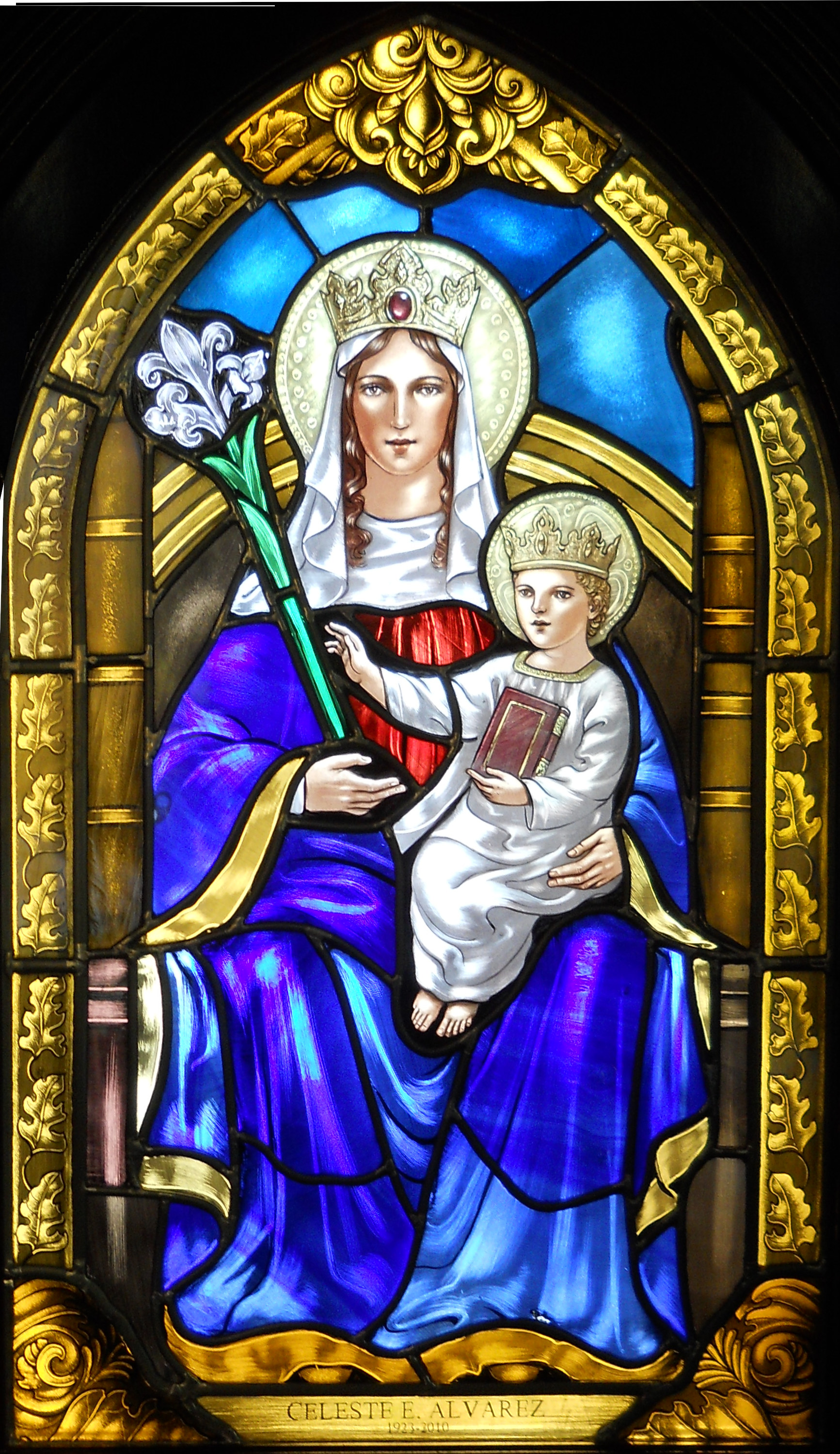
New Celeste Erben Alvarez window depicting Our Lady of Walsingham

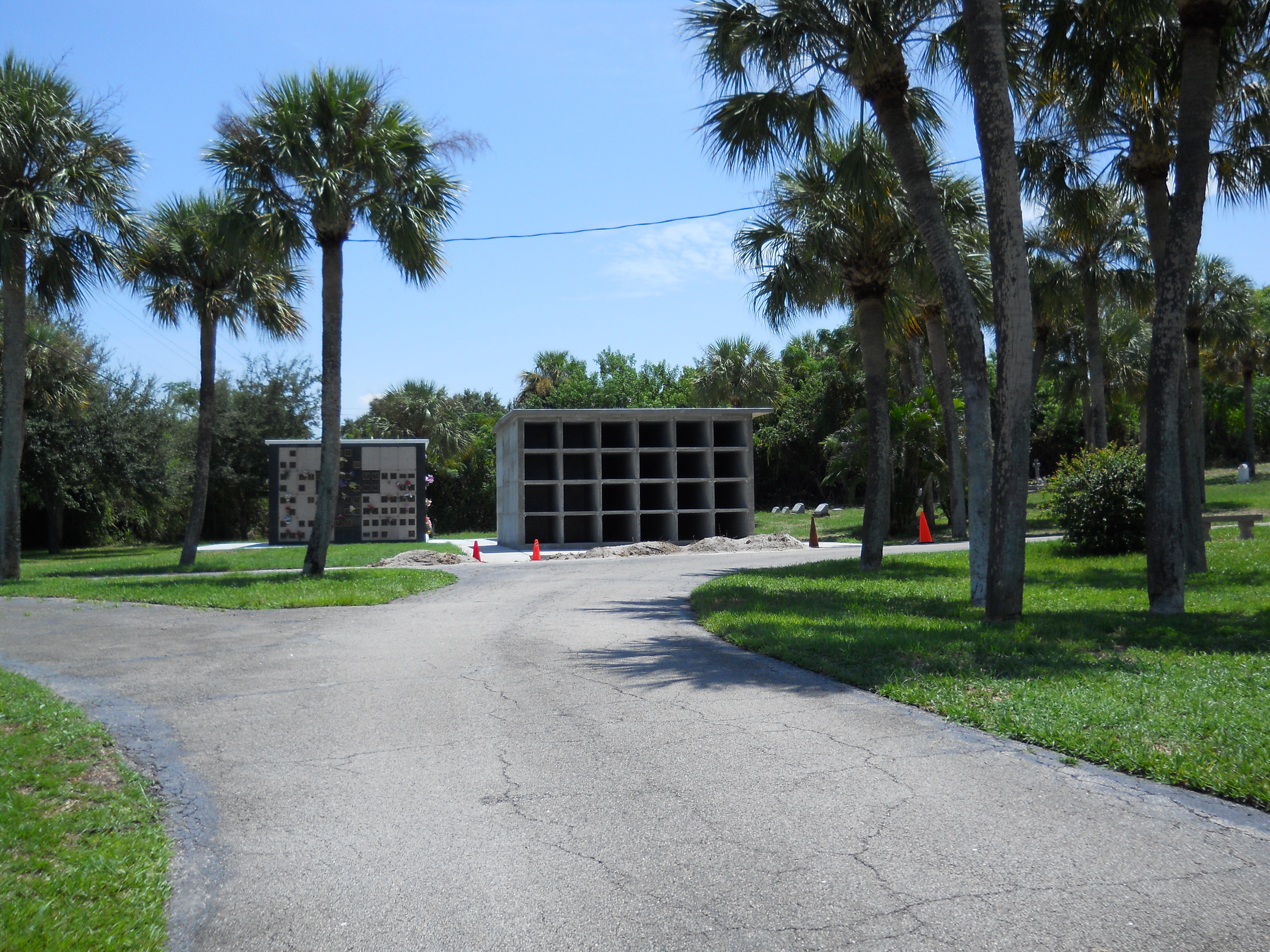
New mausoleum under construction. Existing ones are to the left (shown) and behind (hidden)

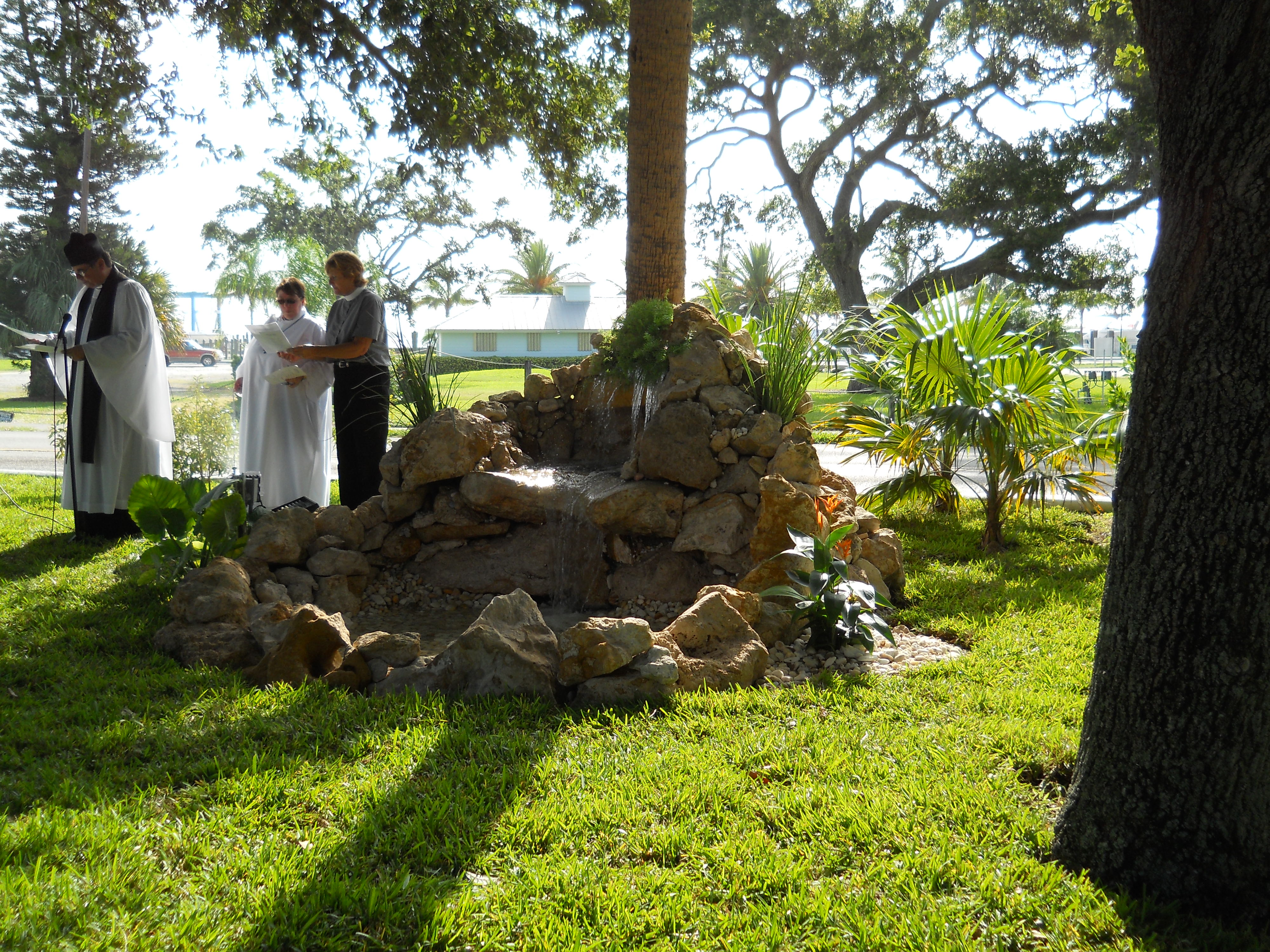
Dedication of Serenity Garden, July 29, 2012

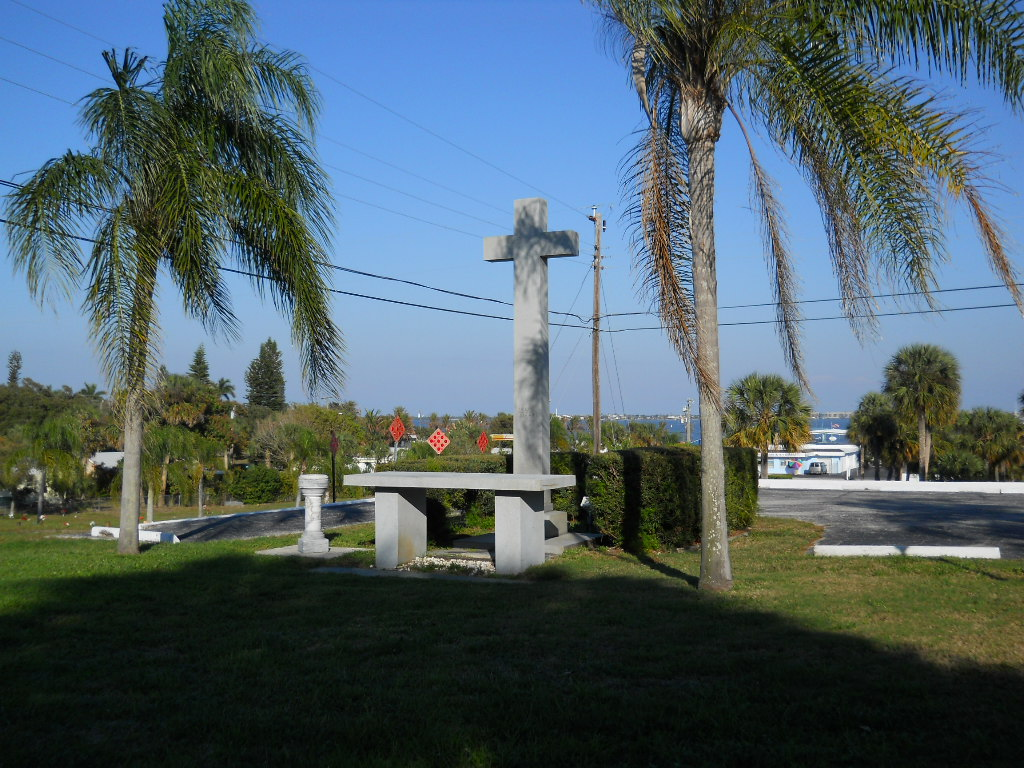
Alleluia Cross and Outdoor Altar

== See also ==
- Episcopal Diocese of South Florida, All Saints' original diocese

== Resources ==
- Thurlow, Sandra Henderson, Historic Eden and Jensen on Florida's Indian River (2004) Stuart: Sewall's Point Company, ISBN 0-9630788-6-0
