= Rio, Florida =

- Census-designated place
- Location in Martin County and the state of Florida
- Coordinates: 27°12′56″N 80°14′44″W
- Country: United States
- State: Florida
- County: Martin
- Settled: 1893

Area
  - Total: 0.90 sq mi (2.34 km^{2})
  - Land: 0.38 sq mi (0.98 km^{2})
  - Water: 0.53 sq mi (1.36 km^{2})
- Elevation: 7 ft (2.1 m)

Population (2020)
  - Total: 980
  - Density: 2,595.7/sq mi (1,002.21/km^{2})
- Time zone: UTC-5 (Eastern (EST))
  - Summer (DST): UTC-4 (EDT)
- ZIP Code: 34957 (Jensen Beach)
- FIPS code: 12-60550
- GNIS feature ID: 2403477

Rio is an unincorporated community and census-designated place (CDP) in Martin County, Florida, United States. The population was 980 at the 2020 census. Rio is pronounced locally as if it were spelled "Rye-oh". It is part of the Port St. Lucie Metropolitan Statistical Area.

== Government ==
Rio sits in Martin County District 1, which includes parts of Stuart, Jensen Beach, Hutchinson Island, and Sewall's Point.

== History ==
Rio proper was platted as "Rio St. Lucie", but the post office established on March 24, 1893, was called "Rio San Lucie". On December 1, 1897, the post office name was shortened to "Rio". The Rio post office was discontinued on March 15, 1902, with the area being taken over by the post office at Goslingville, which was located on the narrow peninsula just north of the present-day Roosevelt Bridge. On April 6, 1904, the Rio post office was reactivated and it continued until October 15, 1927, when it was added to the post office at Jensen, now known as Jensen Beach.

== Geography ==
Rio is located in northeastern Martin County where it sits on the north side of the St. Lucie River across from Stuart, the county seat. It is bordered to the north and east by Jensen Beach and to the northwest by part of the Stuart city limits.

According to the United States Census Bureau, the Rio CDP has a total area of 0.9 square miles (2.3 km^{2}), of which 0.4 square miles (1.0 km^{2}) are land and 0.5 square miles (1.3 km^{2}), or 58.19%, are water.

== Demographics ==
Historical population
Census	Pop.	Note	%±
1980	1,205		—
1990	1,054		−12.5%
2000	1,028		−2.5%
2010	965		−6.1%
2020	980		1.6%
U.S. Decennial Census

As of the census of 2000, there were 1,028 people, 495 households, and 283 families residing in the CDP. The population density was 2,568.5 inhabitants per square mile (991.7/km^{2}). There were 622 housing units at an average density of 1,554.1 per square mile (600.0/km^{2}). The racial makeup of the CDP was 97.96% White, 0.49% African American, 0.10% Native American, 0.39% Asian, 0.10% Pacific Islander, 0.29% from other races, and 0.68% from two or more races. Hispanic or Latino of any race were 1.75% of the population.

There were 495 households, out of which 18.4% had children under the age of 18 living with them, 44.4% were married couples living together, 7.9% had a female householder with no husband present, and 42.8% were non-families. 34.5% of all households were made up of individuals, and 12.1% had someone living alone who was 65 years of age or older. The average household size was 2.08 and the average family size was 2.65.

In the CDP, the population was spread out, with 16.5% under the age of 18, 5.6% from 18 to 24, 22.6% from 25 to 44, 32.3% from 45 to 64, and 23.0% who were 65 years of age or older. The median age was 48 years. For every 100 females, there were 99.6 males. For every 100 females age 18 and over, there were 101.4 males.

The median income for a household in the CDP was $45,089, and the median income for a family was $56,125. Males had a median income of $45,337 versus $31,311 for females. The per capita income for the CDP was $27,674. About 7.6% of families and 11.9% of the population were below the poverty line, including 17.2% of those under age 18 and 10.7% of those age 65 or over.
