= Elliott Museum =

Museum in Stuart, Florida, United States

- Location within Florida
- Established: 1961
- Location: 825 N.E. Ocean Blvd., State Road A-1-A, Hutchinson Island, Stuart, Florida 34996
- Coordinates: 27.2148°N 80.1766°W
- Type: Art, history, technology
- Visitors: 50,000
- Director: Robert Steele President/CEO
- Website: Elliott Museum

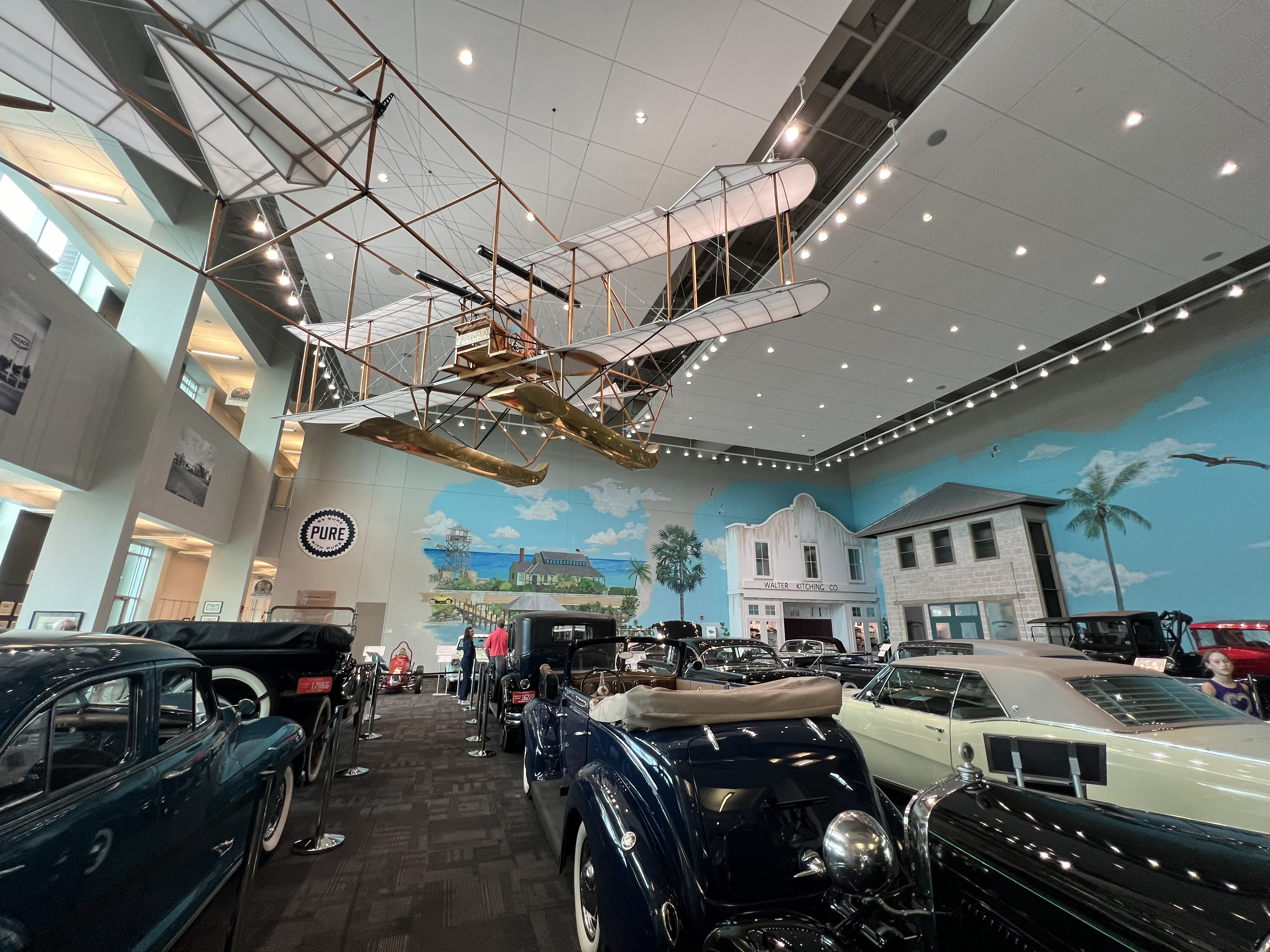
Antique airplane hanging above the vintage automobile exhibit at the Elliott Museum

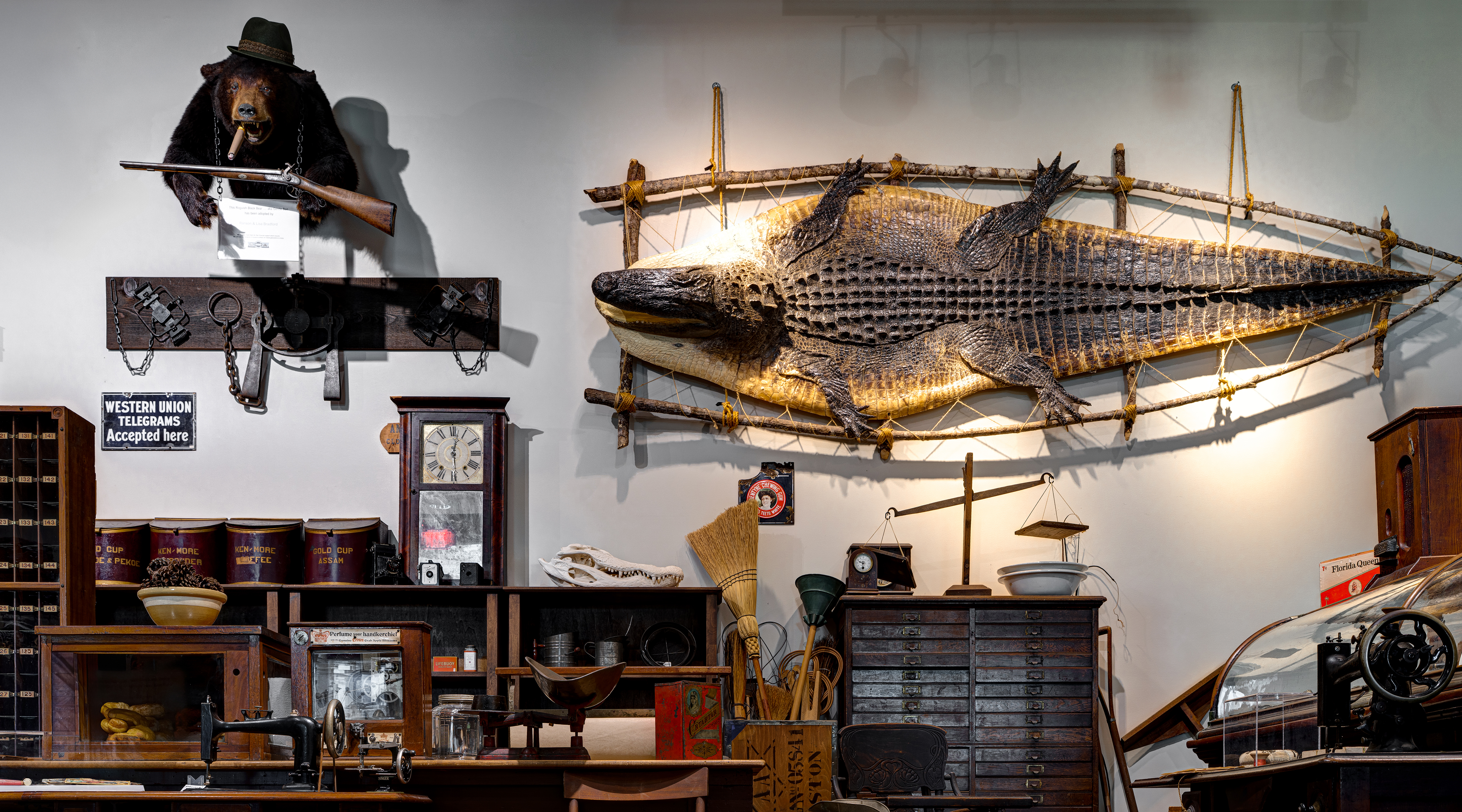
General Store permanent exhibit at the Elliott Museum

The Elliott Museum, located at 825 N.E. Ocean Blvd. on Hutchinson Island in Stuart, Florida, United States, focuses on art, history, and technology. Named after the prolific inventor Sterling Elliott, the museum features a changing exhibition gallery and an art studio; maritime, baseball, and local history galleries; and bicycles, classic wooden boats, motorcycles, over 90 cars and trucks, and even an airplane. Over 50 vehicles are displayed in a unique robotic racking system which retrieves vehicles on demand for display on a turntable. The Elliott Museum has one of the largest collections of historic Ford Model A and Model AA commercial vehicles in the world.

== History ==
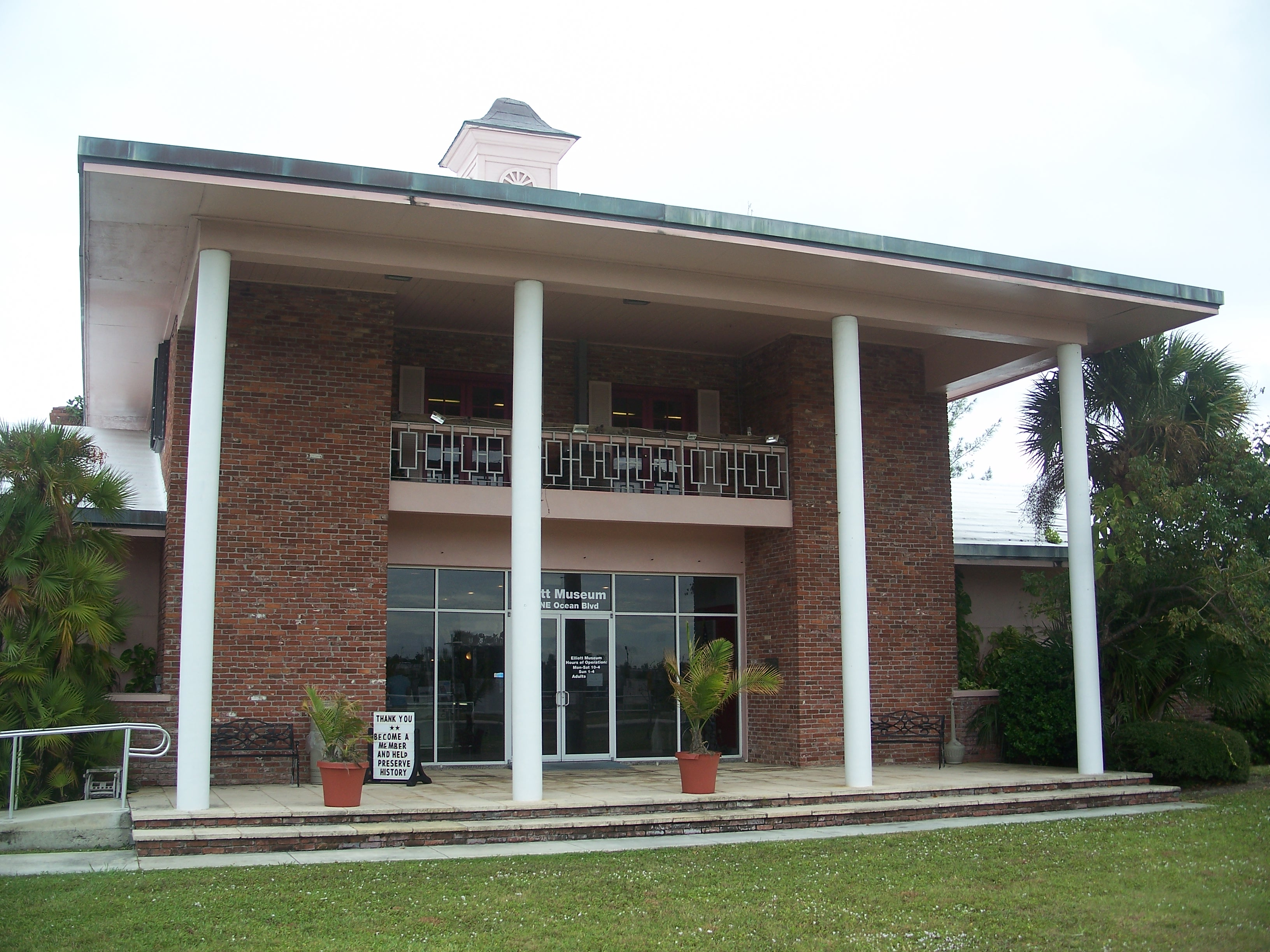
Original museum building, November 2010

The original Elliott Museum was built in 1961 by Harmon Elliott as a tribute to his father, Sterling Elliott. On November 18, 1961, it was given to the non-profit Historical Society of Martin County, which has operated both the Museum and Gilbert’s Bar House of Refuge ever since. Some of the collection came from Sterling Elliott. Much of it was purchased by Harmon Elliott from an Americana Museum in Salem, Massachusetts for display in the Elliott Museum.

Over the years, the original building was in need of repair and the spaces no longer met the needs of the growing museum organization, so in June 2011 the original Elliott Museum building was torn down. The new, 48,000 square foot Elliott Museum opened to the public in March, 2013. The Museum opened with the donation of the Model A and Model AA commercial vehicle collection assembled by Elliott R. Donnelley. Shortly after opening, the Museum merged with the Classic Boat and Maritime Museum, taking on its collection of classic boats, boat models, and its mission of interpreting local maritime history.

== Exhibitions ==
The new Elliott Museum offers permanent and changing exhibitions, and the Museum hosts a number of programs and lectures throughout the course of the year. The Museum attracts a number of vintage car enthusiasts, and its annual car show Classics at the Beach has been held each Spring since 1996.

In 2025, the museum introduced a holographic AI installation featuring British archaeologist Howard Carter. Projected inside an interactive holographic display, the avatar engages visitors in conversation about the 1922 discovery of Tutankhamun’s tomb and the broader context of early 20th-century archaeology. The dialogue and storytelling are grounded in Carter’s original writings and field notes.
