= Stuart Heritage Museum =

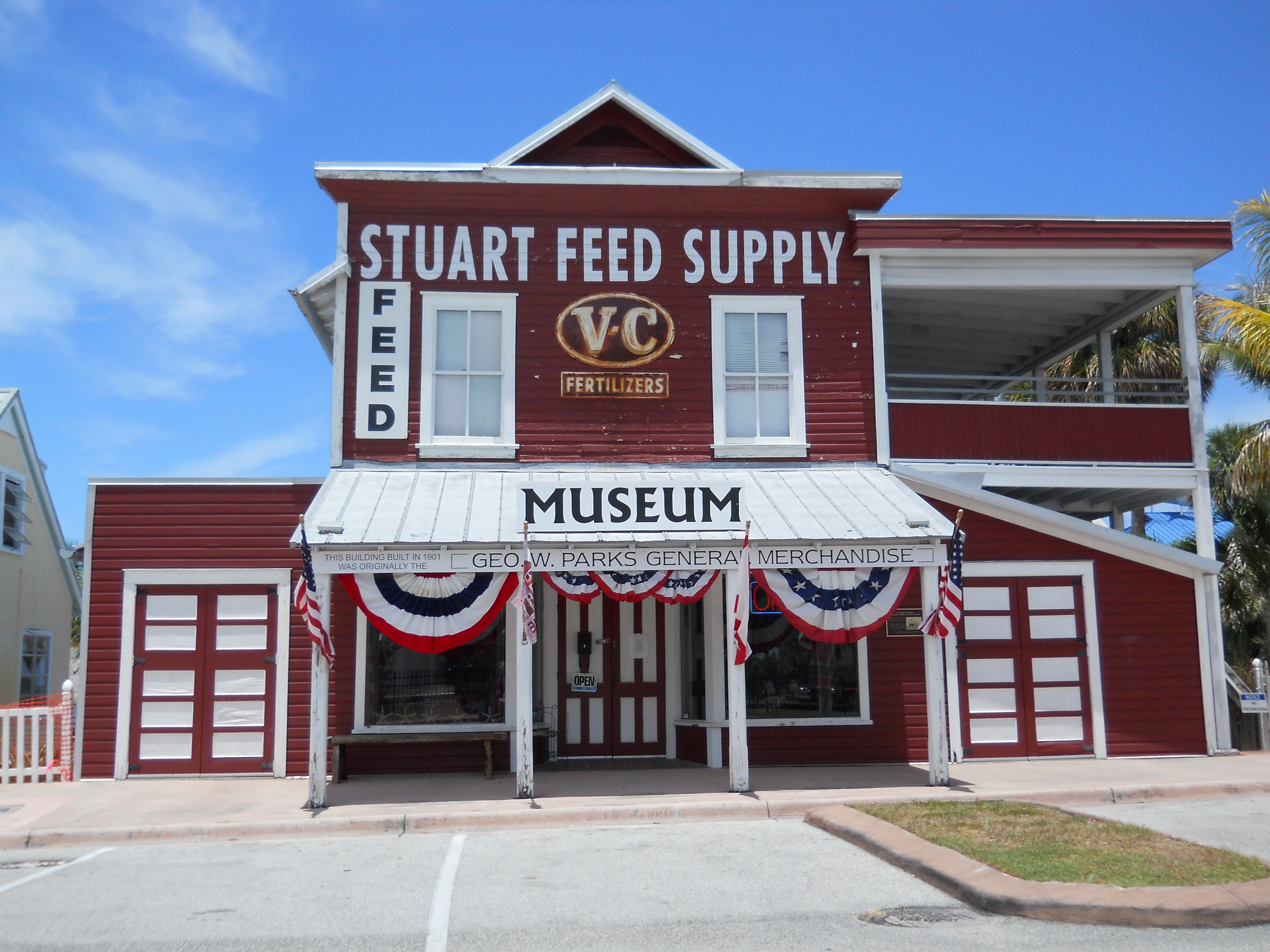

- Location within Florida
- Location: 161 Southwest Flagler Avenue; Stuart, Florida
- Coordinates: 27°12′03″N 80°15′21″W
- Type: History

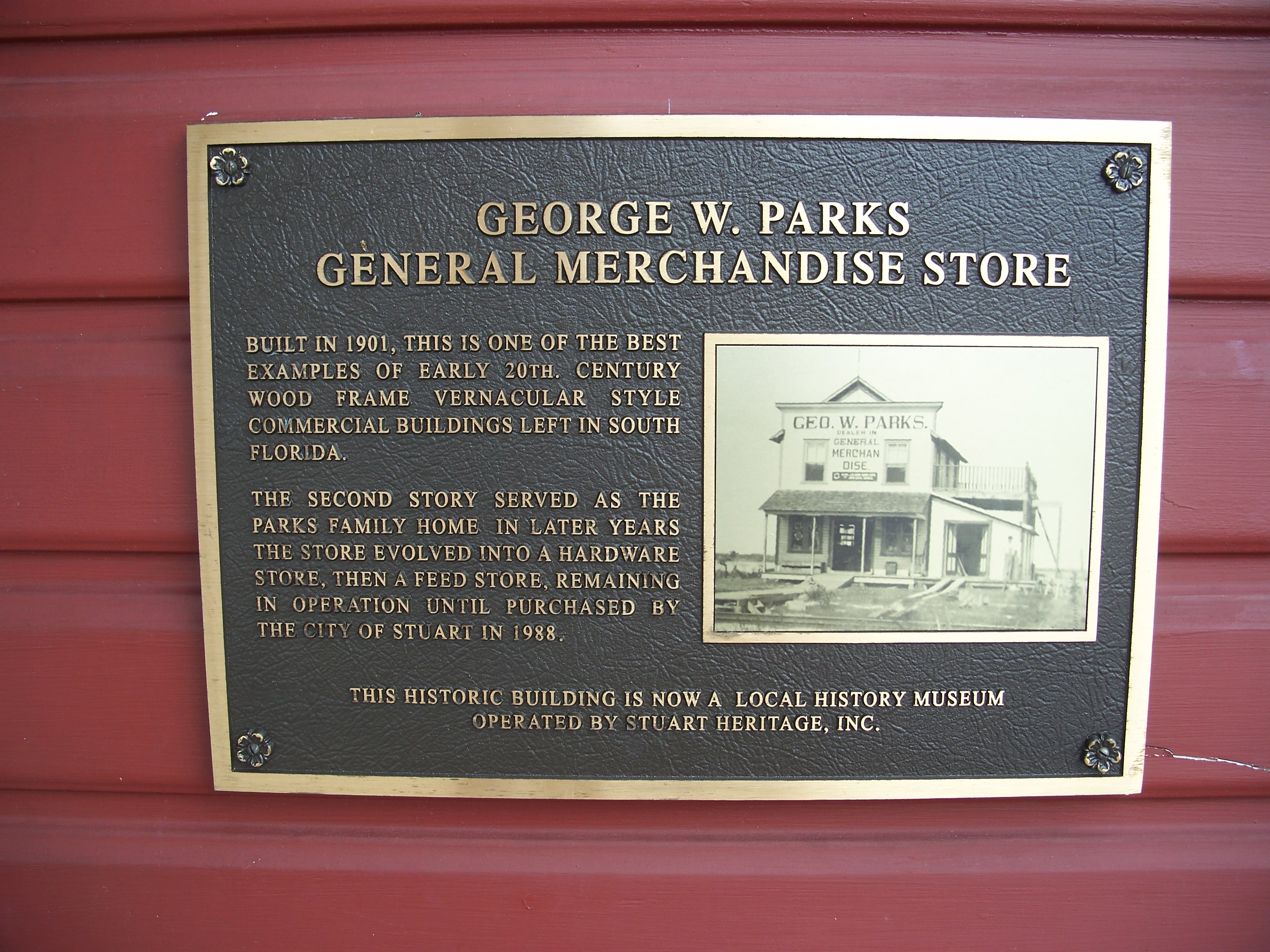
Historic plaque on the building

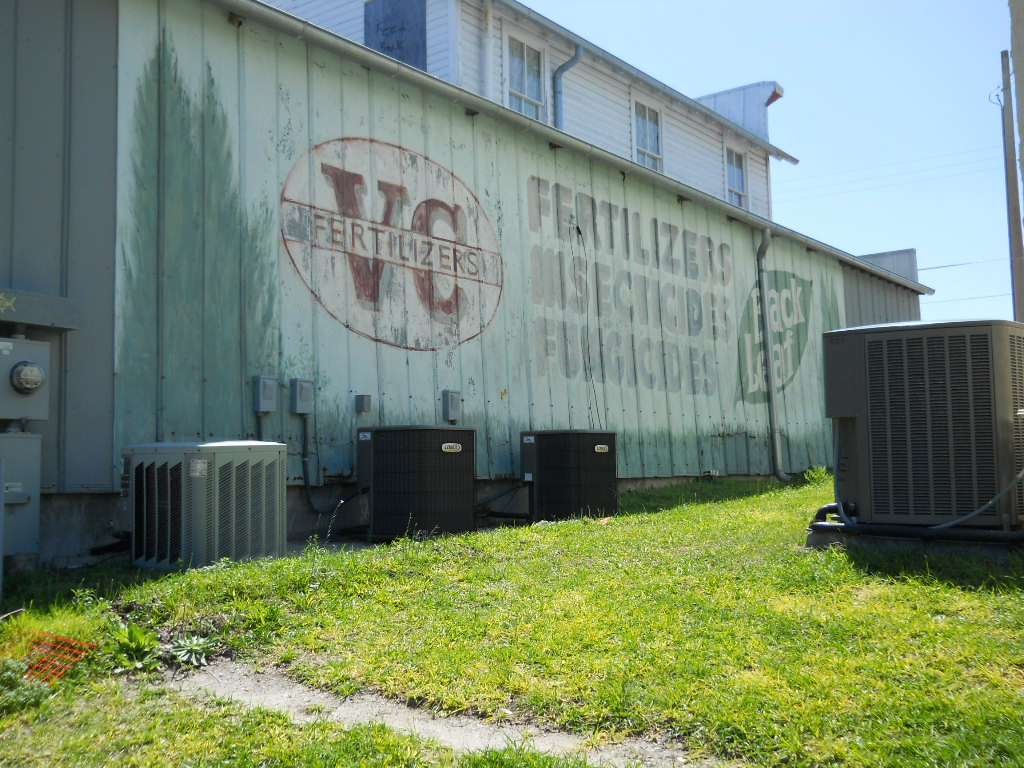
Western wall of building with old V-C Fertilizers ad

The Stuart Heritage Museum, at 161 Southwest Flagler Avenue in Stuart, Florida, is a local history museum located in an historic 2-story frame building built in 1901 by George W. Parks. Parks used the first floor of the building for his Geo. W. Parks Grocery and General Merchandise Store and second floor for his home. In 1913, the building became the Stuart Mercantile Company and in the 1960s after a series of uses, it became the Stuart Feed Store. In 1989, the Stuart Feed Store was listed in A Guide to Florida's Historic Architecture.

The museum houses over 10,000 artifacts from the 1880s to the 1950s.

In April 2010, the historic 1920s Talley and Evans Crary Sr. House at 311 Cardinal Way was cut in half and moved to the vacant lot just west of the Feed Store, where it awaits restoration and use by Stuart Heritage Museum.
