= Hutchinson Island South, Florida =

- CDP
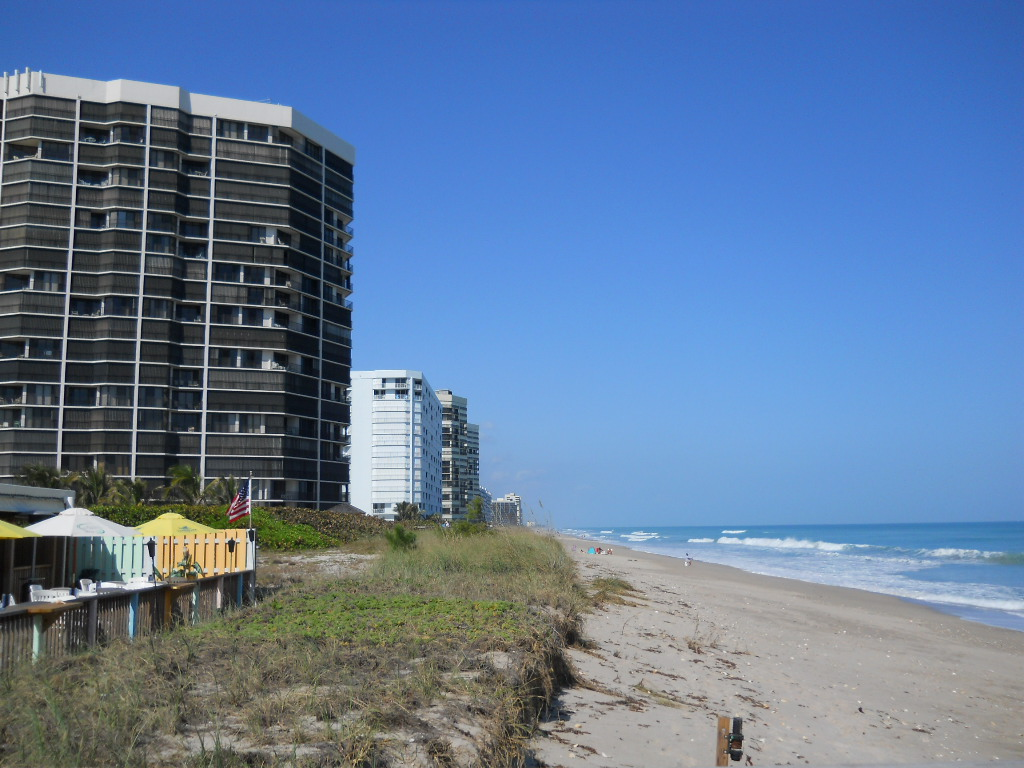
- Looking north along the beach from Shuckers Restaurant, 9800 South Ocean Drive

- Location in St. Lucie County and the state of Florida
- Coordinates: 27°21′11″N 80°14′40″W
- Country: United States
- State: Florida
- County: St. Lucie

Area
  - Total: 48.09 sq mi (124.56 km^{2})
  - Land: 4.31 sq mi (11.15 km^{2})
  - Water: 43.79 sq mi (113.41 km^{2})
- Elevation: 0 ft (0 m)

Population (2020)
  - Total: 4,988
  - Density: 1,158.4/sq mi (447.25/km^{2})
- Time zone: UTC−05:00 (Eastern (EST))
  - Summer (DST): UTC−04:00 (EDT)
- FIPS code: 12-32993
- GNIS ID: 2402607

Hutchinson Island South is a census-designated place (CDP) on the barrier island of Hutchinson Island in St. Lucie County, Florida, United States. As of the 2020 census, Hutchinson Island South had a population of 4,988. It is part of the Port St. Lucie Metropolitan Statistical Area. Its mail is delivered from Jensen Beach 34957 in nearby Martin County. The Jensen Beach post office has a postal contract substation known as Hutchinson Beach located at 11007 South Ocean Drive, but it offers only post office boxes and counter services.

== Geography ==
According to the United States Census Bureau, the CDP has a total area of 48.1 square miles (125 km^{2}), of which 4.5 square miles (12 km^{2}) is land and 43.6 square miles (113 km^{2}) (90.62%) is water.

== Transportation ==
The primary road is South Ocean Drive, which is also known as State Road A1A and passes from north to south through the community.

== Demographics ==
Historical population
Census	Pop.	Note	%±
1990	3,893		—
2000	4,846		24.5%
2010	5,201		7.3%
2020	4,988		−4.1%

=== 2020 census ===
As of the 2020 census, Hutchinson Island South had a population of 4,988. The median age was 70.7 years. 2.1% of residents were under the age of 18 and 68.6% of residents were 65 years of age or older. For every 100 females there were 87.9 males, and for every 100 females age 18 and over there were 87.4 males age 18 and over.

100.0% of residents lived in urban areas, while 0.0% lived in rural areas.

There were 2,947 households in Hutchinson Island South, of which 3.5% had children under the age of 18 living in them. Of all households, 52.6% were married-couple households, 15.8% were households with a male householder and no spouse or partner present, and 26.7% were households with a female householder and no spouse or partner present. About 37.5% of all households were made up of individuals and 28.0% had someone living alone who was 65 years of age or older.

There were 6,408 housing units, of which 54.0% were vacant. The homeowner vacancy rate was 3.0% and the rental vacancy rate was 27.6%.

Racial composition as of the 2020 census
Race	Number	Percent
White	4,745	95.1%
Black or African American	18	0.4%
American Indian and Alaska Native	6	0.1%
Asian	38	0.8%
Native Hawaiian and Other Pacific Islander	0	0.0%
Some other race	8	0.2%
Two or more races	173	3.5%
Hispanic or Latino (of any race)	164	3.3%

=== 2010 census ===
As of the 2010 census, there were 5,201 people, 2,827 households, and 1,749 families residing in the CDP. The population density was 1,074.1 inhabitants per square mile (414.7/km^{2}). There were 5,889 housing units at an average density of 1,305.3 per square mile (504.0/km^{2}). The racial makeup of the CDP was 98.95% White, 0.14% African American, 0.12% Native American, 0.23% Asian, 0.10% from other races, and 0.45% from two or more races. Hispanic or Latino of any race were 0.89% of the population.

There were 2,827 households, out of which 1.8% had children under the age of 18 living with them, 59.0% were married couples living together, 1.8% had a female householder with no husband present, and 38.1% were non-families. 34.2% of all households were made up of individuals, and 24.5% had someone living alone who was 65 years of age or older. The average household size was 1.71 and the average family size was 2.08.

In the CDP, the population was spread out, with 1.8% under the age of 18, 0.7% from 18 to 24, 6.6% from 25 to 44, 29.5% from 45 to 64, and 61.4% who were 65 years of age or older. The median age was 69 years. For every 100 females, there were 88.6 males. For every 100 females age 18 and over, there were 88.7 males.

The median income for a household in the CDP was $43,329, and the median income for a family was $49,978. Males had a median income of $47,150 versus $27,679 for females. The per capita income for the CDP was $37,575. About 2.4% of families and 4.5% of the population were below the poverty line, including none of those under age 18 and 3.3% of those age 65 or over.
