= Florida Oceanographic Society =

American non-profit organization

- Founded: 1964
- Founder: James H. Rand and five community leaders.
- Type: Nonprofit
- Purpose: Educational, Research
- Location: Stuart, Florida
- Key people: Mark D. Perry
- Website: https://www.floridaocean.org

Florida Oceanographic Society is a non-profit organization founded in 1964 and its goal is to inspire environmental stewardship of Florida's coastal ecosystems through education and research.

== Florida Oceanographic Coastal Center ==
Florida Oceanographic Coastal Center is a 57-acre (23 ha) marine life nature center located on Hutchinson Island in Stuart, Florida, situated between the Indian River and the Atlantic Ocean. Florida Oceanographic Coastal Center offers educational programs and conducts research and restoration programs that lead to healthy coastal ecosystems.

== Research ==
The Florida Oceanographic Society conducts research, monitoring and habitat restoration in South Florida, particularly in the southern portion of the Indian River Lagoon. The Indian River Lagoon is home to more than 4,300 species of plants and animals, including 36 rare and endangered species.

Research programs include the Florida Oceanographic Oyster Restoration program (FLOOR). Found mainly in estuaries, oyster reefs are compromised by human settlement, including development and boating activity. In South Florida, oyster reefs face an additional threat. Discharges from Lake Okeechobee have diluted the salinity levels in estuaries, threatening the survival of oyster reefs.

FLOOR began in 2005 with local citizens volunteering through Florida Oceanographic Society to grow oysters off their private docks. The group grew to over 100 volunteers actively cultivating oysters, and in November 2009, Dr. Vincent Encomio, Research Scientist at Florida Oceanographic, and a team of volunteers began the Oyster Shell Recycling Program. Shells are acquired from local restaurants, quarantined for a minimum of three months, during which time they are composted and free of any potential living contaminant, and packaged in mesh bags for reef building.

In 2022, FLOOR used a 3D printer to create a concrete reef in Stuart, Florida.

== Education ==
Florida Oceanographic Society educates students from a four-county area (Palm Beach, Martin, St. Lucie, and Okeechobee counties) with on-site programs, outreach curriculum, and on-line activities.
