= Sterling Elliott =

Influential inventor

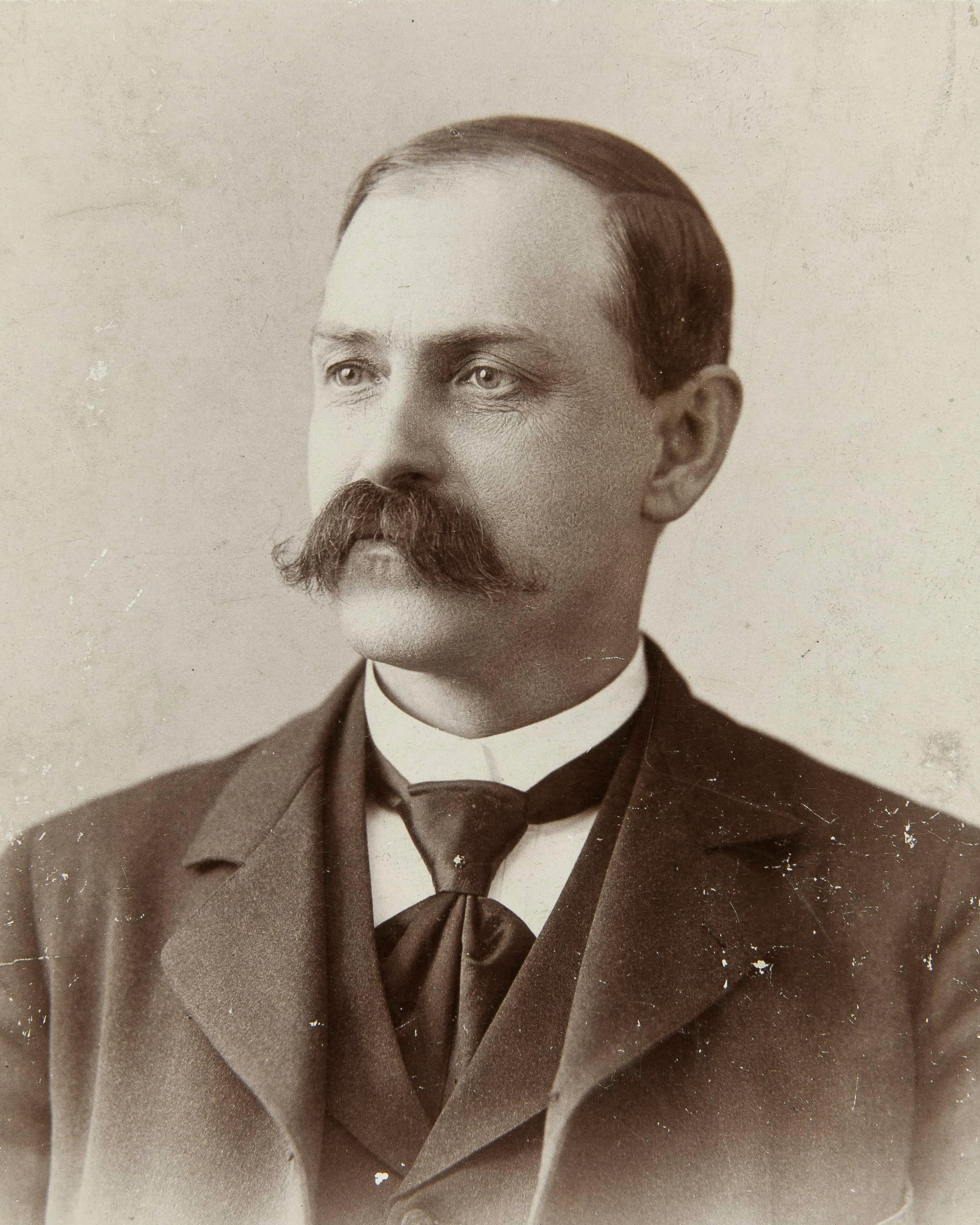
- Elliott circa 1885
- Born: 1852; Ortonville, Michigan, United States
- Died: 1922 (aged 70)
- Occupation: Inventor
- Known for: Steering knuckle
- Spouse: Adell Parker Elliott
- Children: 1

Sterling Elliott (1852–1922) was an American inventor, who produced a series of successful innovations in the late 19th and early 20th centuries. He held more than 125 patents, receiving his first at age 22. He developed the first Knot Tying machine (No.237,966), the low wheeled trotting sulky (No.494,113), the Elliott addressing machine (No.707,961), the pneumatic tire (No.487,874), the ball bearing (No. 483,836). he unequal turning of the front wheels or steering knuckle (i.e. kingpin) turned out to be a critical element in the success of the automobile.

== Early life ==
Sterling Elliott was born in 1852 on a farm in Ortonville, Michigan. At the age of twelve years all of the farm work was turned over to Sterling. At the age of seventeen, with help from his mother, Sterling Elliott packed a bag and left home. He walked the 92 miles to Grand Rapids where he arrived in 1869 with about $8.00 in his pocket. His first job in Grand Rapids was to work on the railroad trains selling candy and fruit. In 1870 he went to Chicago where he worked for a wealthy business man, Mr. Matthew Laflin. In Chicago Sterling Elliott was granted several United States Patents on his invention, but he had no shop of his own and contracted with others to manufacture his inventions. Mr. Elliott decided to move to Boston, Massachusetts where he opened his first machine shop. In 1882 he bought some land a few miles west of Boston and moved into his own factory (Elliott 5-11).

== Elliott’s first invention was the non-turning front axle and self-equalizing brake system he incorporated on his four-wheel quadricycle when he discovered that the wheels on the bike squealed when turning. That is when he realized that you couldn't just connect the front wheels of a normal pair of bicycles with a tie rod, that somehow the inside wheel must turn at a slower speed than the one on the outside if you were to prevent that squeal. With this in mind, Elliott went home and into his pantry that was between the kitchen and the dining room, there he fastened a piece of string between the inside surfaces of each door. Then, whether swung to the right or the left, the doors remained parallel and swung exactly the same. Next he shortened the string so that the doors were at an angle, their hinges being further apart than their front edges. Standing in the pantry he pushed the left hand door toward the kitchen and noted that only a small amount of movement in this direction produced considerably more movement to the right hand door. After again closing the doors he pushed the right hand door a small distance into the dining room and noticed that the kitchen door opened again wider than it had before. Soon after, he converted that principle to his quadricycle. ==
Although this patent expired in 1907, the records show that a number of early automobile manufacturers paid royalties to Elliott for this invention. Among these were the Duryea, Haynes, and Stanley

Elliott's Quadricycle (Velocipede), for which he received United States Patent No. 442,663 on December 16, 1890, featured the non-turning front axle, the unequal turning of the front wheels, a differential rear axle, independent vertical action of all four wheels, and self-equalizing brakes. Many of Sterlings inventions, including the quadricycle, can be found in the Elliott Museum which was founded by his only son, Harmon Elliott.

== Bicycle era ==
From 1885 to 1896 Sterling Elliott made many products, but his principal products were bicycles and trotting sulkies and as a side line he published "The Bicycling World" and was President of the League of American Wheelmen and Chairman of its committee that controlled Bicycle Racing (Pridmore and Hurd 10). In 1887 Sterling Elliott made a four-wheeled bicycle which he called a quadricycle and with it experienced all the problems that automobile manufacturers were later to face. Sterling Elliott sold the Elliott Bicycle Factory to the Stanley Brothers of Stanley Steamer car fame and opened the Elliott Addressing Machine Company in 1900 (Elliott 21-25).

== Elliott Addressing Machine Company ==
Sterling Elliott had invented the addressing machine to address his magazine wrappers in 1898. In 1909 Sterling Elliott asked his only son Harmon Elliott to become his partner at the Elliott Addressing Machine Company. Harmon accepted the position and took over management after Sterling's death on February 13, 1922 (Elliott 52).
