= Hutchinson Island (Florida) =

Island in Florida, United States of America

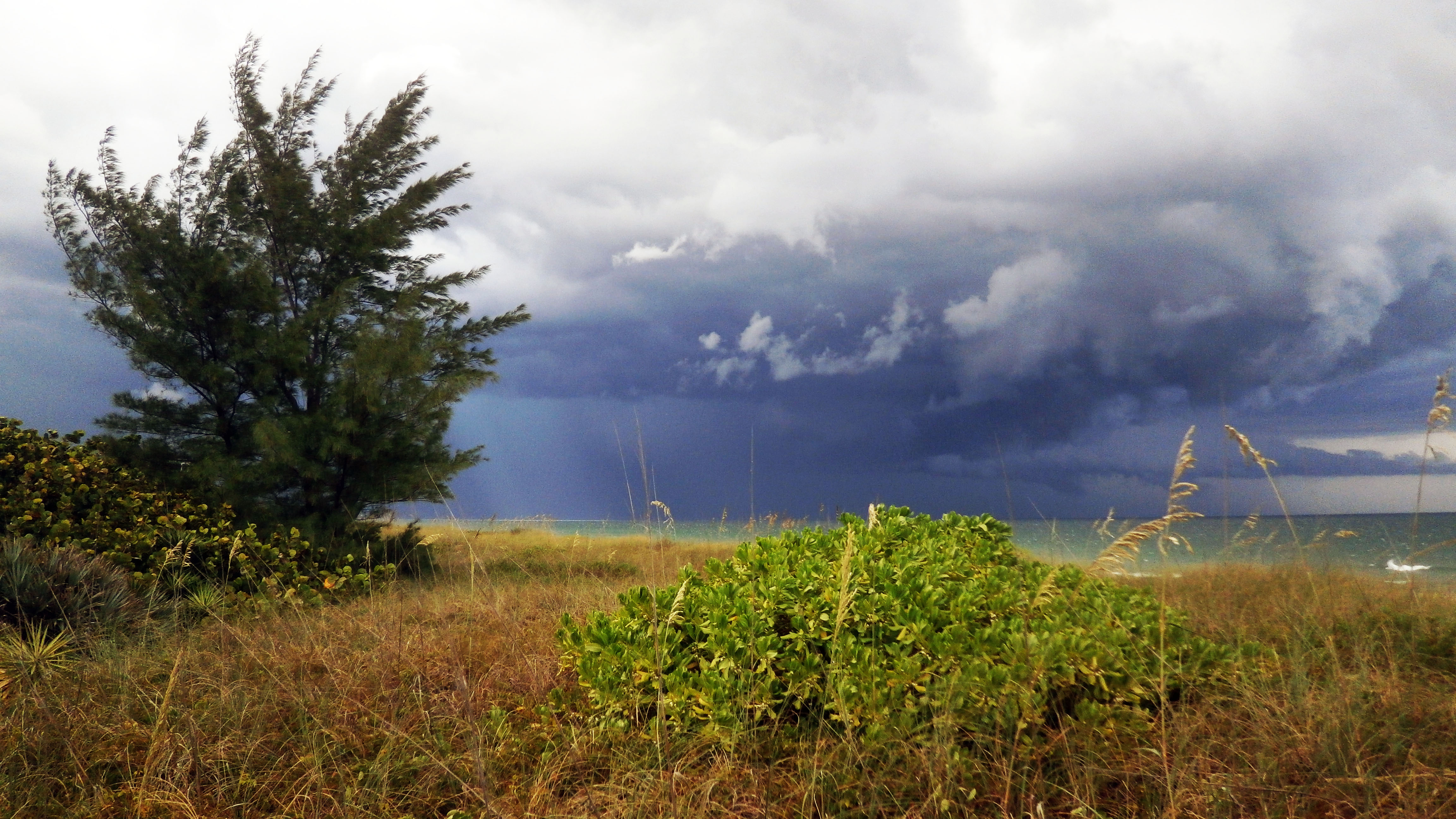
- Storm approaching Stuart Beach on Hutchinson Island

- Hutchinson Island Hutchinson Island (Florida) (North Atlantic)

Geography
- Location: North Atlantic
- Coordinates: 27°17′46″N 80°12′58″W

Administration
- United States
- State: Florida
- County: St. Lucie

Hutchinson Island consists of two barrier islands on the coast of Martin, St. Lucie, and Indian River counties, in Florida. The two islands are separated by the Fort Pierce Inlet and are known as "North Hutchinson Island" and "South Hutchinson Island".

== North Hutchinson Island ==
North Hutchinson Island is divided into two counties - Indian River County and St. Lucie County. Although it is not a separate island, the Indian River county portion of North Hutchinson Island that extends to the Sebastian Inlet sometimes is called "Orchid Island".

== South Hutchinson Island ==
The Martin County portion of Hutchinson Island is unincorporated. The southern end, which sometimes is called "Stuart Beach", receives mail from Stuart Zip Code 34996, while the northern part receives its mail from Jensen Beach ZIP code 34957. Martin County has limited the building height on the island to four stories and thus has no high-rise or mid-rise buildings. The closest incorporated areas to the Martin County portion of Hutchinson Island are the towns of Ocean Breeze and Sewall's Point. The city of Stuart is west of Sewall's Point.

=== Points of interest ===
- The House of Refuge, on the National Register of Historic Places, is located on S.E. MacArthur Boulevard near the southern end of the south island.
- The Elliott Museum is on N.E. Ocean Boulevard.
- The Florida Oceanographic Coastal Center is across the road from the Elliott Museum.
- Island Princess Cruises departs nearby.

=== South Hutchinson Island beaches ===
Large Public Beaches located on South Hutchinson Island:

- Two popular large public beaches with lifeguard stations, pavilions, concessions, restrooms, outdoor showers, and ample parking are located in Martin County on So. Hutchinson Island. Jensen Sea Turtle Beach is located at the intersection of N.E. Ocean Boulevard and the Jensen Beach Causeway, while Stuart Beach is located east of the Elliott Museum off N.E. Ocean Boulevard.

Smaller beaches and beach strips:

- Martin County also owns smaller beach strips along the oceanfront from Bathtub Beach on the south end of MacArthur Boulevard to one located just south of the St. Lucie County line on the north. Bathtub Beach is the only one of these to have any amenities beyond the standard wooden stairs over the dunes. It is very popular with families with children because of the calm, shallow pools at water's edge warmed by the sun's rays and protected from the breaking surf by large offshore rock formations. The smallest beach strip is the Park-N-Fish located just north of the House of Refuge.

=== 2004 hurricanes ===
In 2004 the island was hit by two hurricanes which made landfall on the Martin County portion of the island. On September 5, 2004, Hurricane Frances made landfall with winds of 105 miles per hour (169 km/h). On September 25, 2004, Hurricane Jeanne made landfall with winds of 120 miles per hour (190 km/h).

== St. Lucie County portion ==
The St. Lucie County portion of the island consists of three parts as follows:

=== Hutchinson Island South C.D.P. ===
The southern part of the St. Lucie County portion comprises the Hutchinson Island South census-designated place, but that name is rarely used by residents, who receive their mail from Jensen Beach ZIP code 34957. The Jensen Beach post office has a postal contract substation known as Hutchinson Beach located at 11007 South Ocean Drive, but it offers only post office boxes and counter services.

The ocean front north of the St. Lucie County line is lined with mid-rise luxury condominium buildings. South of that line Martin County limits buildings to four stories. Several resorts are located on the island. On the Indian River side there is a mix of communities, the largest of which is Nettles Island. Several popular restaurants and shops are located on the island.

== Climate ==
Climate data for Hutchinson Island, Florida (Nettles Island), 1991–2020 normals, extremes 2002–2023
Month	Jan	Feb	Mar	Apr	May	Jun	Jul	Aug	Sep	Oct	Nov	Dec	Year
Record high °F (°C)	87 (31)	90 (32)	91 (33)	96 (36)	95 (35)	99 (37)	99 (37)	97 (36)	98 (37)	94 (34)	92 (33)	87 (31)	99 (37)
Mean maximum °F (°C)	82.7 (28.2)	85.4 (29.7)	86.2 (30.1)	89.1 (31.7)	90.6 (32.6)	94.2 (34.6)	93.6 (34.2)	93.5 (34.2)	93.0 (33.9)	89.8 (32.1)	85.3 (29.6)	83.5 (28.6)	96.1 (35.6)
Mean daily maximum °F (°C)	73.1 (22.8)	73.8 (23.2)	76.6 (24.8)	80.3 (26.8)	83.7 (28.7)	87.3 (30.7)	88.6 (31.4)	89.1 (31.7)	87.6 (30.9)	84.7 (29.3)	79.1 (26.2)	75.1 (23.9)	81.6 (27.6)
Daily mean °F (°C)	65.2 (18.4)	66.8 (19.3)	69.9 (21.1)	74.2 (23.4)	77.8 (25.4)	81.5 (27.5)	82.6 (28.1)	83.1 (28.4)	82.0 (27.8)	78.8 (26.0)	72.5 (22.5)	68.2 (20.1)	75.2 (24.0)
Mean daily minimum °F (°C)	57.2 (14.0)	59.7 (15.4)	63.2 (17.3)	68.1 (20.1)	71.9 (22.2)	75.6 (24.2)	76.7 (24.8)	77.0 (25.0)	76.4 (24.7)	72.8 (22.7)	65.8 (18.8)	61.3 (16.3)	68.8 (20.4)
Mean minimum °F (°C)	43.5 (6.4)	45.2 (7.3)	49.7 (9.8)	58.5 (14.7)	65.6 (18.7)	71.4 (21.9)	73.0 (22.8)	73.5 (23.1)	72.2 (22.3)	61.4 (16.3)	51.0 (10.6)	47.4 (8.6)	39.6 (4.2)
Record low °F (°C)	33 (1)	35 (2)	42 (6)	50 (10)	59 (15)	69 (21)	70 (21)	71 (22)	65 (18)	50 (10)	43 (6)	31 (−1)	31 (−1)
Average precipitation inches (mm)	3.12 (79)	2.57 (65)	3.68 (93)	2.76 (70)	4.77 (121)	6.96 (177)	5.92 (150)	7.91 (201)	9.22 (234)	5.82 (148)	3.39 (86)	2.80 (71)	58.92 (1,497)
Source: NOAA (mean maxima 2006–2020)

== Transportation ==
The main north-south highway on Hutchinson Island is State Road A1A that enters the island several miles north of the St. Lucie Inlet at Stuart Beach via the Ernest Lyons Bridge across the Indian River from Sewall's Point. A1A exits the island approximately 22 miles to the north via the South Bridge in Fort Pierce.

In Martin County, A1A is known as Northeast (or N.E.) Ocean Boulevard based on the naming system of that county, while in St. Lucie County, A1A is known as South (or S.) Ocean Drive from the Martin County line north to the traffic circle at the Fort Pierce Inlet, based on the naming system of that county. At the Fort Pierce Inlet, A1A turns west onto Seaway Drive for the short distance to the South Bridge and US 1.

The only other road access to the island is in Martin County on State Road 732, N.E. Causeway Boulevard, which crosses the Indian River from its intersection with County Road 707 and Indian River Drive in Jensen Beach on the mainland over the Frank A. Wacha Bridge and Causeway. State Road 732 reaches its eastern terminus at a traffic circle with A1A and the entrance to Jensen Sea Turtle Public Beach.

The only internal public road in the Martin County portion of Hutchinson Island is MacArthur Boulevard which runs south from A1A to the entrance to the Sailfish Point development that is approximately a mile north of the inlet.

In the St. Lucie County portion of the island, there are many platted public subdivision streets and roads in the area that is within the Fort Pierce city limits. Practically all other roads on the island in either county are private roads controlled by homeowner associations or condominiums.

== Gallery ==
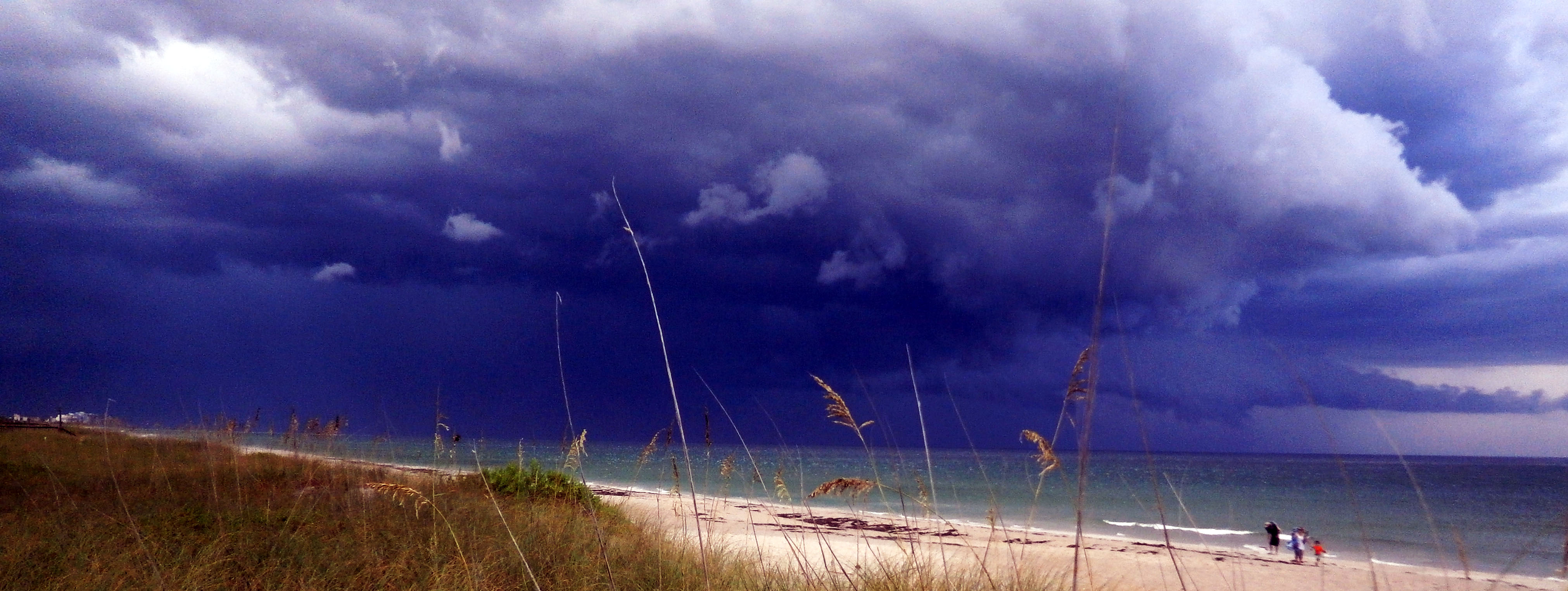
Summer storm approaching the beach at Hutchinson Island

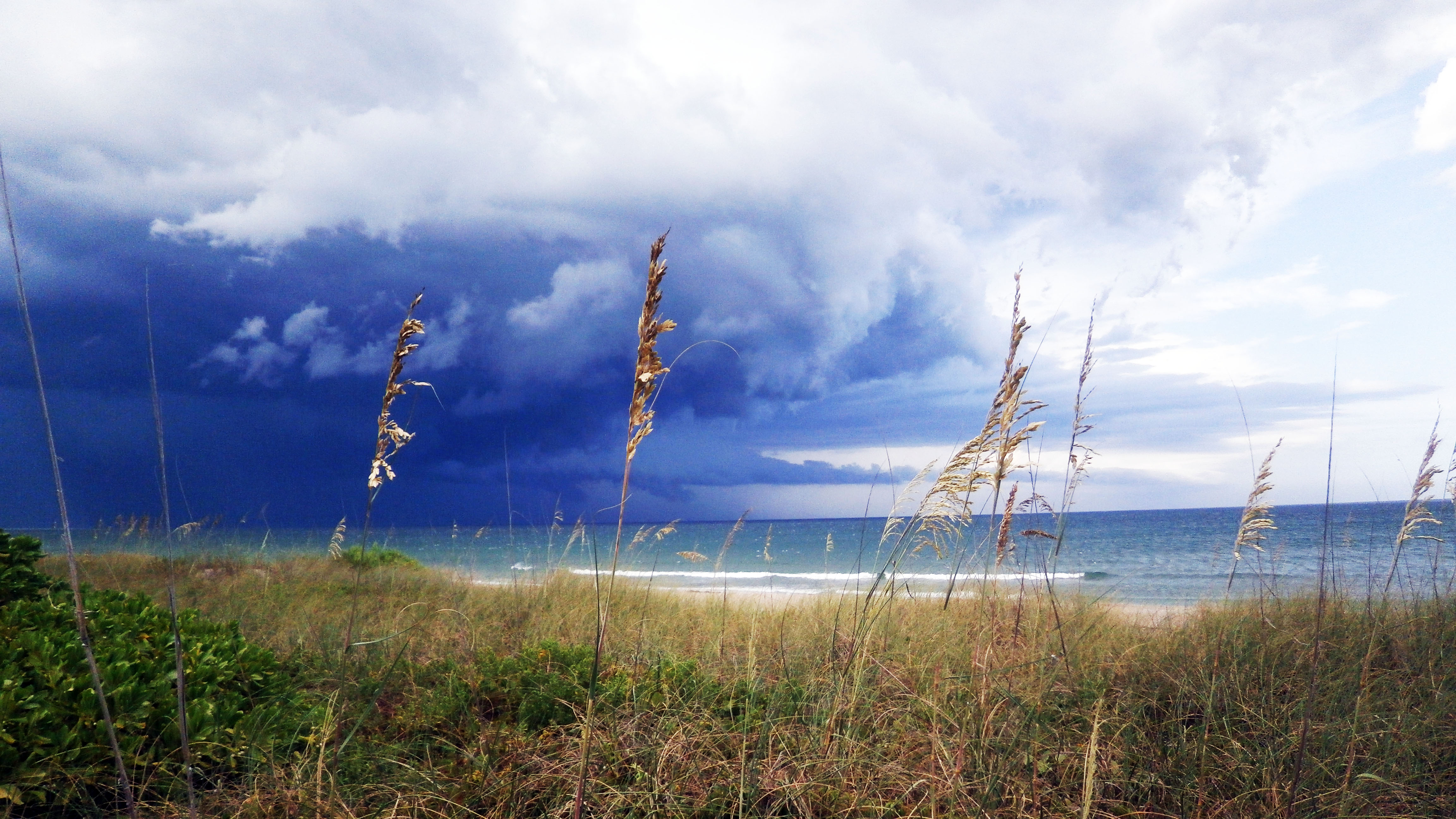
Storm approaching the beach

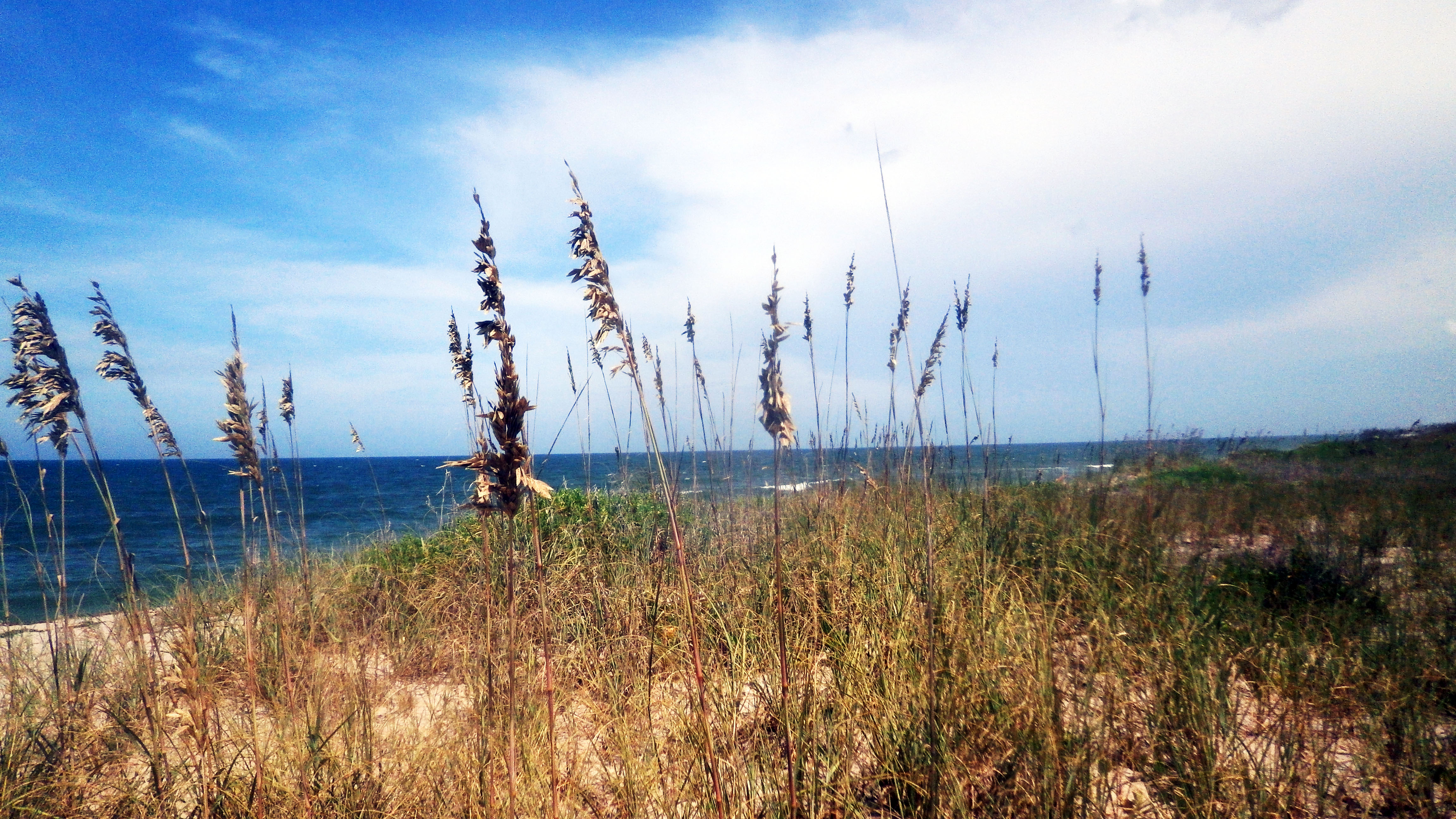
View of sea oats on the beach before an approaching storm
