= Stuart, Florida =

- City
- City of Stuart
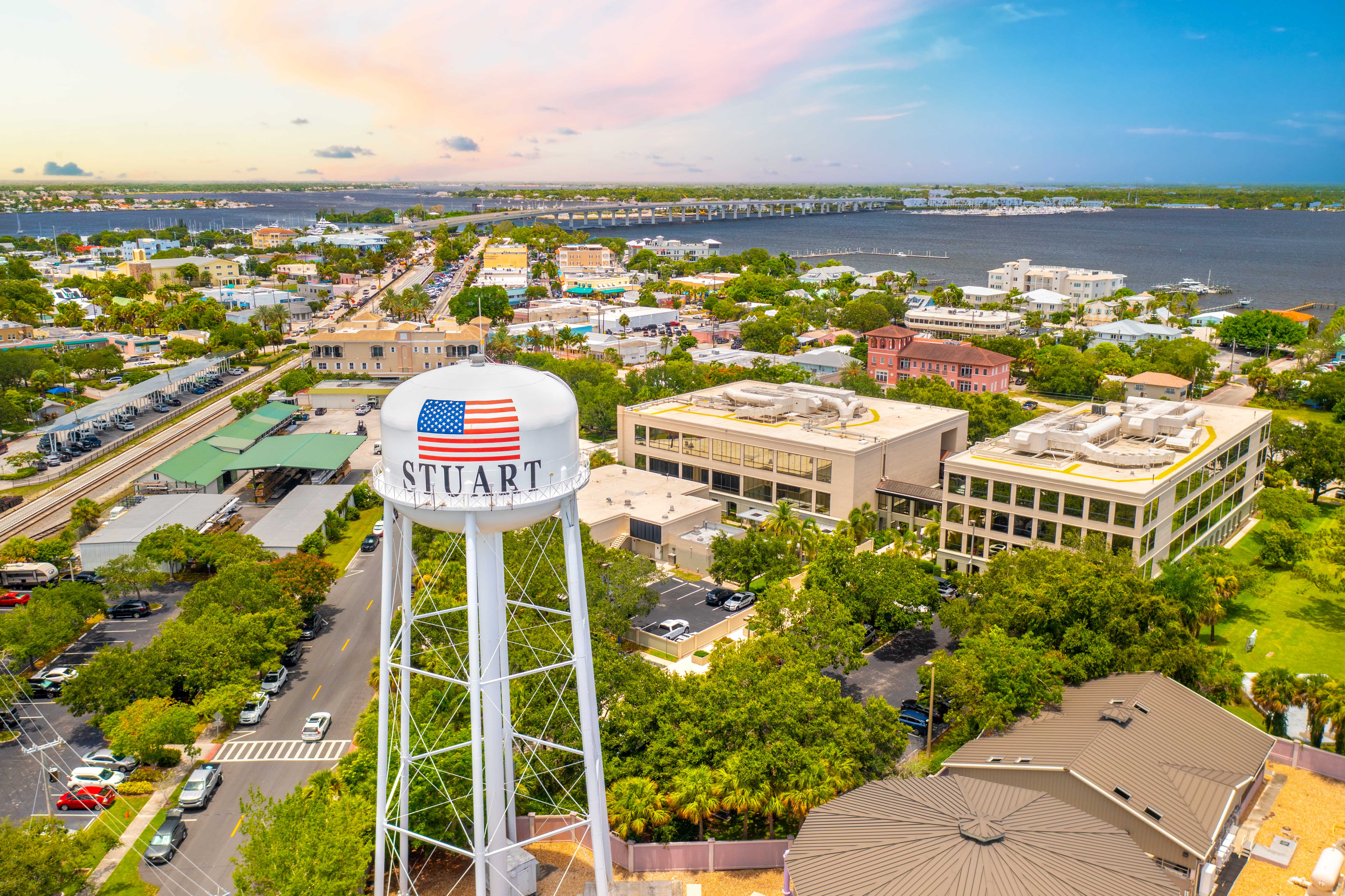
- Downtown Stuart

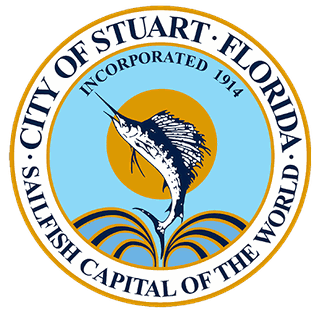
- Seal
- Nickname: Sailfish Capital of the World
- Location in Martin County and the state of Florida
- Coordinates: 27°12′14″N 80°15′05″W
- Country: United States
- State: Florida
- County: Martin
- City: 1914

Government
  - Type: Commission-Manager

Area
  - Total: 9.53 sq mi (24.67 km^{2})
  - Land: 7.05 sq mi (18.25 km^{2})
  - Water: 2.48 sq mi (6.42 km^{2})
- Elevation: 10 ft (3.0 m)

Population (2020)
  - Total: 17,425
  - Density: 2,470/sq mi (955/km^{2})
- Time zone: UTC−5 (Eastern (EST))
  - Summer (DST): UTC−4 (EDT)
- ZIP codes: 34994-34997
- Area code: 772
- FIPS code: 12-68875
- GNIS feature ID: 2405535
- Website: City of Stuart Website

Stuart is a city in and the county seat of Martin County, Florida, United States. Located in southeastern Florida, Stuart is the largest of five incorporated municipalities in Martin County. The population is 17,425 according to the 2020 U.S. census. Stuart is the 126th largest city in Florida based on official 2019 estimates from the U.S. Census Bureau. It is part of the Port St. Lucie, Florida Metropolitan Statistical Area.

Stuart is frequently cited as one of the best small towns to visit in the U.S., in large part because of its proximity to the St. Lucie River, Indian River Lagoon, and the Atlantic Ocean.

== History ==
In the 18th century, several Spanish galleons were shipwrecked in the Martin County area of Florida's Treasure Coast. The multiple wrecks were reportedly the result of a hurricane, and the ships were carrying unknown quantities of gold and silver. Some of this treasure has since been recovered, and its presence resulted in the region's name.

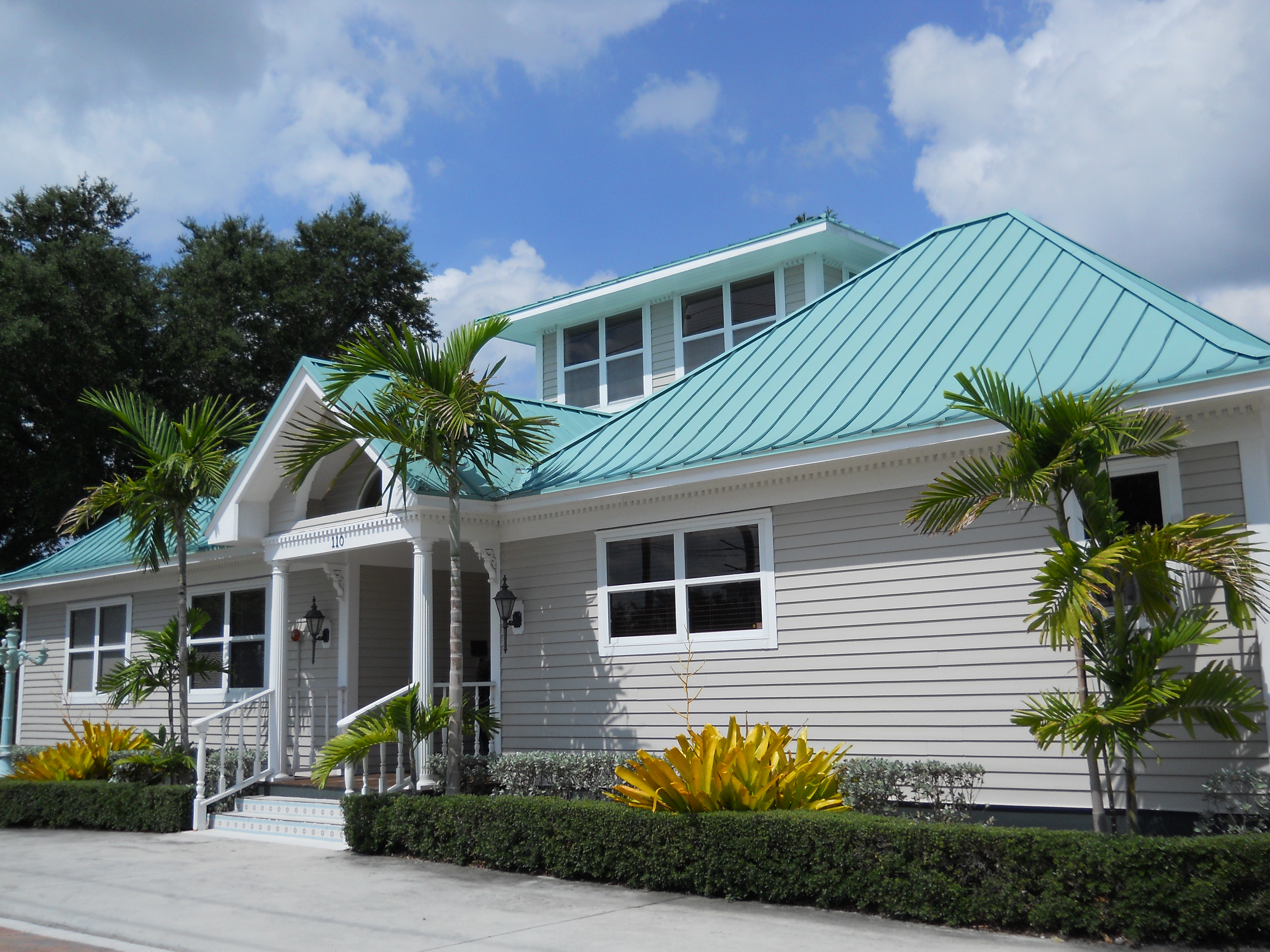
The historic Dudley-Bessey House on SW Atlanta Avenue is now a yacht brokerage office

In 1832, pirate Pedro Gilbert, who often used a sandbar off the coast as a lure to unsuspecting prey, chased and caught the Mexican, a U.S. merchant ship. Although he attempted to burn the ship and kill the crew, they survived to report the incident, ultimately resulting in the capture and execution of Gilbert and his crew. The bar from which he lured his intended booty is named "Gilbert's Bar" on nautical charts.

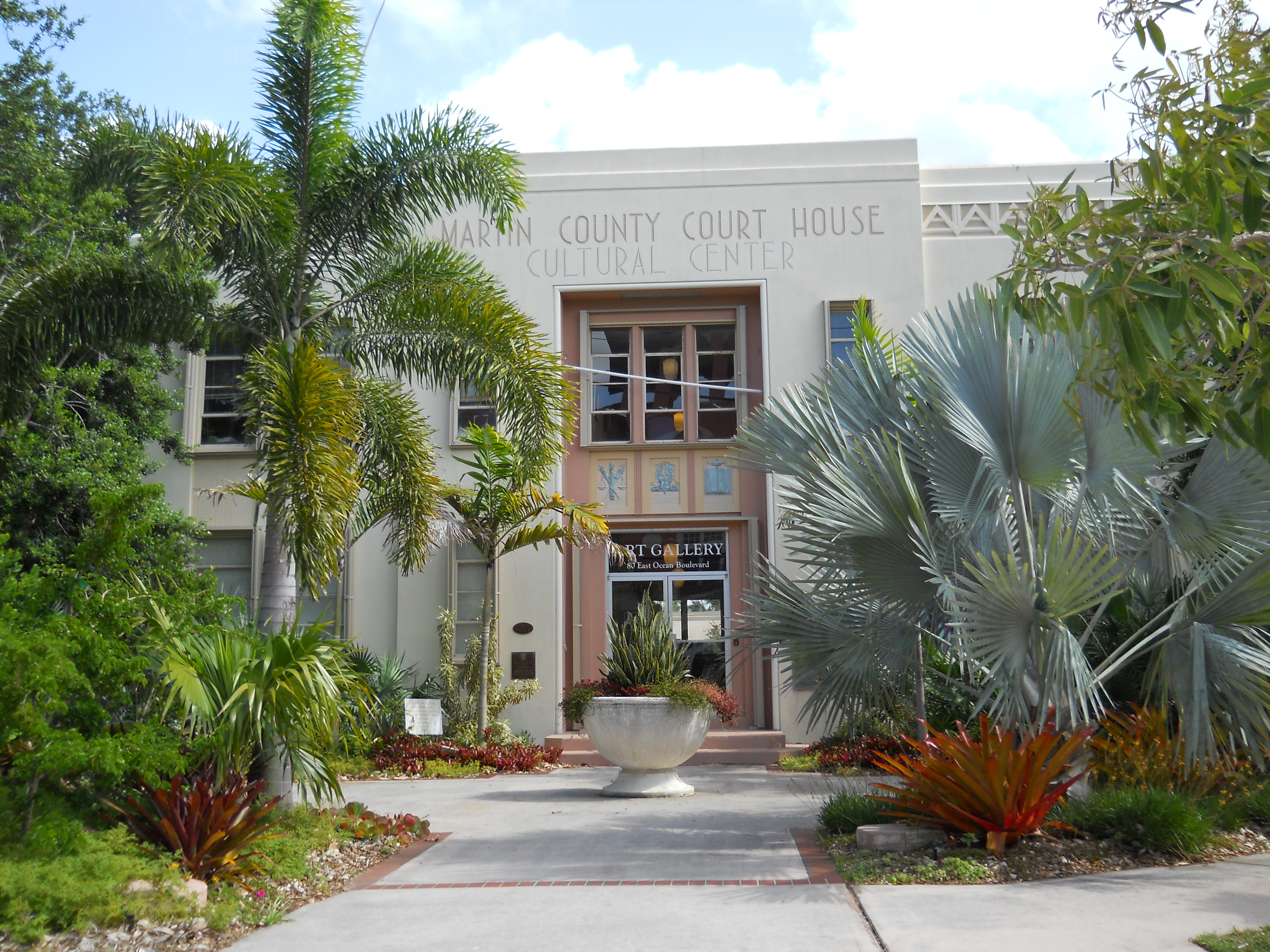
The Old Martin County Courthouse, built in 1937, now the Courthouse Cultural Center

The Treasure Coast area that became Stuart was first settled by non-Native Americans in 1870. In 1875, a United States Lifesaving Station was established on Hutchinson Island, near Stuart. Today, the station is known as Gilbert's Bar House of Refuge and is on the National Register of Historic Places.

From 1893 to 1895, the area was called Potsdam. This name was chosen by Otto Stypmann, a local landowner originally from Potsdam, Germany. Stypmann, with his brother Ernest, owned the land that would become downtown Stuart. Henry Flagler's Florida East Coast Railway connected the area to Daytona Beach in 1892 and Miami in 1896.

Potsdam was renamed Stuart in 1895, in honor of Homer Hine (Jack) Stuart Jr., a local landowner who owned 160 acres around the railway station. Rue, Luckhardt, Krueger, Crary, and Armellinis were some of the prominent settler families.

When Stuart was incorporated as a town in 1914, it was located in Palm Beach County. In 1925, Stuart was chartered as a city and named the county seat of the newly created Martin County.

The City of Stuart formally adopted the slogan Sailfish Capital of the World in 1957, following pressure from the Stuart Chamber of Commerce, owing to the many sailfish found in the ocean off Martin County. The slogan is still used by the city.

From 1871 to 2005, 19 hurricanes passed through Stuart, including Isbell (1964), Frances (2004), Jeanne (2004), and Wilma (2005).

== Geography ==
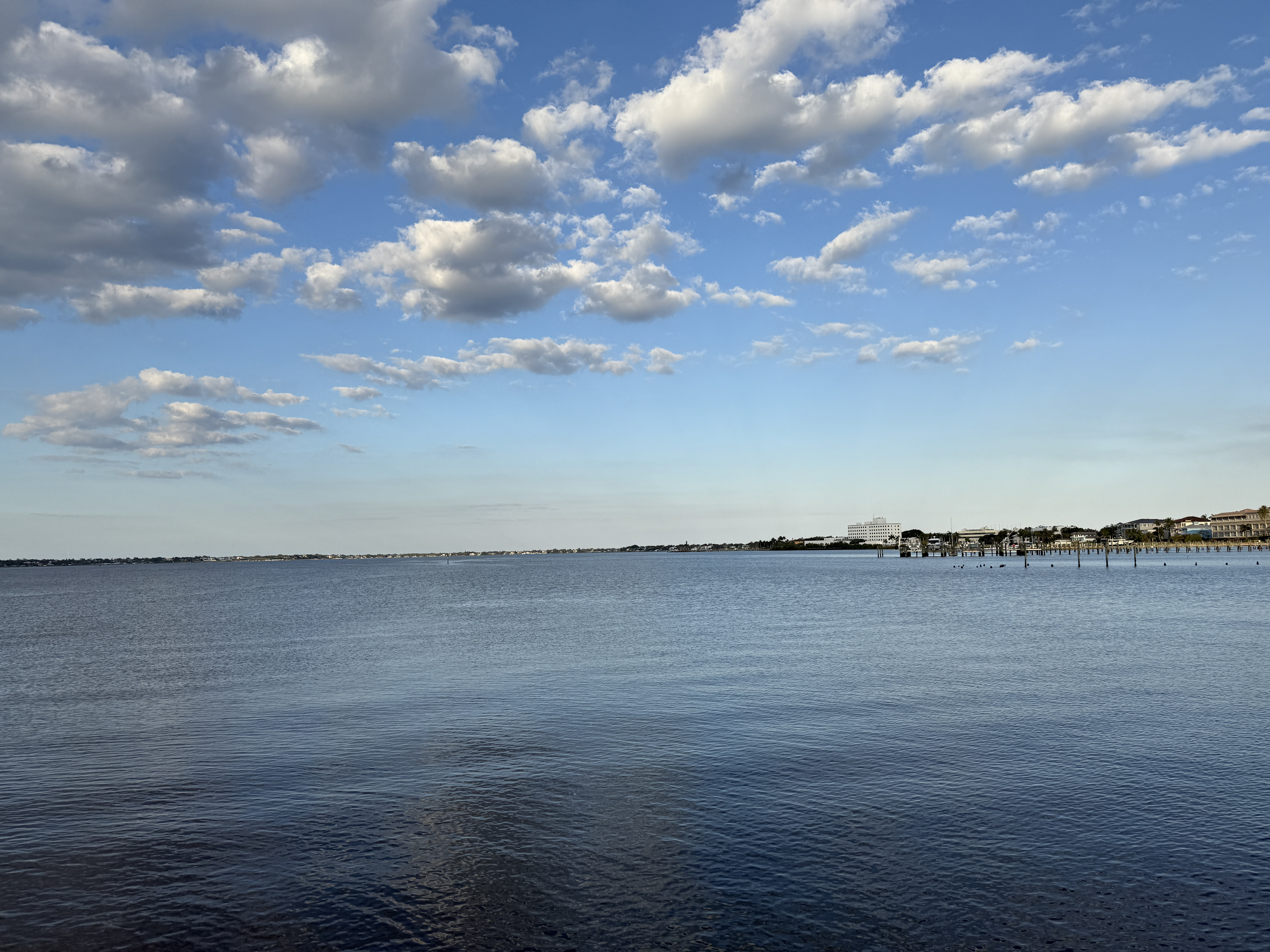
St. Lucie River in Stuart

According to the United States Census Bureau, the city has a total area of 8.5 square miles (22 km^{2}), of which 6.3 square miles (16 km^{2}) is land and 2.2 square miles (5.7 km^{2}) is water.

=== Climate ===
According to the Köppen climate classification, Stuart has a tropical rainforest climate (Af), with hot, humid summers and warm, drier winters. Stuart has a noticeably seasonal precipitation pattern, with summer being the wettest season and winter being the driest.

Summers feature hot temperatures and frequent thunderstorms. Average highs during summer range from 88 to 91 °F (31 to 33 °C). On average, there are 81 days of 90+ °F highs annually, with an average annual mean maximum of 96.4 °F (35.8 °C). Late summer brings an increased threat of tropical storms and hurricanes, though landfalls are rare. Several major hurricanes have impacted Stuart since 1900, with Hurricane David in 1979 and hurricanes Frances and Jeanne causing moderate damage to the area in 2004.

Winter brings much cooler and drier air. Average highs during winter range from 74 to 78 °F (23 to 26 °C), though occasional strong cold fronts bring brief rainfall followed by cooler temperatures, with highs in the 50s °F for a few days each winter. Most winters are frost-free, with an annual mean minimum temperature of 37.6 °F (3.1 °C).

Climate data for Stuart, Florida, 1991–2020 normals, extremes 1936–present
Month	Jan	Feb	Mar	Apr	May	Jun	Jul	Aug	Sep	Oct	Nov	Dec	Year
Record high °F (°C)	89 (32)	98 (37)	93 (34)	98 (37)	98 (37)	102 (39)	105 (41)	99 (37)	102 (39)	97 (36)	100 (38)	99 (37)	105 (41)
Mean maximum °F (°C)	84.1 (28.9)	85.7 (29.8)	87.7 (30.9)	89.8 (32.1)	91.7 (33.2)	94.4 (34.7)	94.8 (34.9)	94.3 (34.6)	93.6 (34.2)	90.3 (32.4)	86.7 (30.4)	85.3 (29.6)	96.4 (35.8)
Mean daily maximum °F (°C)	74.2 (23.4)	76.2 (24.6)	78.4 (25.8)	82.3 (27.9)	85.7 (29.8)	89.2 (31.8)	90.9 (32.7)	90.6 (32.6)	88.8 (31.6)	85.1 (29.5)	79.7 (26.5)	76.1 (24.5)	83.1 (28.4)
Daily mean °F (°C)	64.9 (18.3)	67.4 (19.7)	69.9 (21.1)	74.4 (23.6)	78.2 (25.7)	81.8 (27.7)	83.2 (28.4)	83.2 (28.4)	82.0 (27.8)	78.4 (25.8)	72.4 (22.4)	68.1 (20.1)	75.3 (24.1)
Mean daily minimum °F (°C)	55.7 (13.2)	58.6 (14.8)	61.4 (16.3)	66.5 (19.2)	70.8 (21.6)	74.4 (23.6)	75.5 (24.2)	75.8 (24.3)	75.2 (24.0)	71.8 (22.1)	65.1 (18.4)	60.1 (15.6)	67.6 (19.8)
Mean minimum °F (°C)	39.6 (4.2)	42.0 (5.6)	47.1 (8.4)	54.3 (12.4)	63.4 (17.4)	69.8 (21.0)	71.0 (21.7)	71.4 (21.9)	70.9 (21.6)	60.5 (15.8)	50.4 (10.2)	44.0 (6.7)	37.6 (3.1)
Record low °F (°C)	23 (−5)	28 (−2)	27 (−3)	37 (3)	45 (7)	55 (13)	59 (15)	59 (15)	58 (14)	42 (6)	31 (−1)	26 (−3)	23 (−5)
Average precipitation inches (mm)	3.01 (76)	2.61 (66)	3.76 (96)	3.56 (90)	5.66 (144)	7.44 (189)	6.08 (154)	8.49 (216)	8.28 (210)	6.46 (164)	4.16 (106)	3.21 (82)	62.72 (1,593)
Average precipitation days (≥ 0.01 in)	8.7	7.7	7.9	8.7	10.2	14.1	14.4	16.2	15.9	13.5	10.2	10.2	137.7
Source: NOAA

== Demographics ==
Historical population
Census	Pop.	Note	%±
1920	778		—
1930	1,924		147.3%
1940	2,438		26.7%
1950	2,912		19.4%
1960	4,791		64.5%
1970	4,820		0.6%
1980	9,467		96.4%
1990	11,936		26.1%
2000	14,633		22.6%
2010	15,593		6.6%
2020	17,425		11.7%
U.S. Decennial Census

=== Racial and ethnic composition ===
Stuart racial composition (Hispanics excluded from racial categories) (NH = Non-Hispanic)
Race	Pop 2010	Pop 2020	% 2010	% 2020
White (NH)	11,392	11,905	73.06%	68.32%
Black or African American (NH)	1,815	1,945	11.64%	11.16%
Native American or Alaska Native (NH)	28	23	0.18%	0.13%
Asian (NH)	171	277	1.10%	1.59%
Pacific Islander or Native Hawaiian (NH)	10	2	0.06%	0.01%
Some other race (NH)	31	81	0.20%	0.46%
Two or more races/Multiracial (NH)	223	570	1.43%	3.27%
Hispanic or Latino (any race)	1,923	2,622	12.33%	15.05%
Total	15,593	17,425		

=== 2020 census ===
As of the 2020 census, Stuart had a population of 17,425. The median age was 52.5 years. 15.9% of residents were under the age of 18 and 31.2% of residents were 65 years of age or older. For every 100 females there were 88.5 males, and for every 100 females age 18 and over there were 85.5 males age 18 and over.

100.0% of residents lived in urban areas, while 0.0% lived in rural areas.

There were 8,120 households in Stuart, of which 19.2% had children under the age of 18 living in them. Of all households, 32.4% were married-couple households, 23.8% were households with a male householder and no spouse or partner present, and 36.9% were households with a female householder and no spouse or partner present. About 42.8% of all households were made up of individuals and 22.9% had someone living alone who was 65 years of age or older.

There were 9,803 housing units, of which 17.2% were vacant. The homeowner vacancy rate was 2.6% and the rental vacancy rate was 9.6%.

=== 2010 census ===
As of the 2010 United States census, there were 15,593 people, 7,182 households, and 3,470 families residing in the city.

In 2010, the median income for a household in the city was $35,954, and the median income for a family was $47,736. Males had a median income of $29,151 versus $23,125 for females. The per capita income for the city was $25,020.

=== Cost of living ===
As of 2010, the cost of living in Stuart is 88, on a relative scale where the U.S. average is represented by 100.

Cost of Living	Stuart	U.S.
Overall	88	100
Food	105	100
Utilities	97	100
Housing	55	100

=== 2000 census ===
As of the census of 2000, there were 14,633 people, 7,220 households, and 3,422 families residing in the city. The population density was 2,320 people per square mile (900 people/km^{2}). There were 8,777 housing units at an average density of 1,392 units per square mile (537 units/km^{2}). The racial makeup of the city was 83.30% White, 12.33% African American, 0.26% Native American, 0.66% Asian, 0.03% Pacific Islander, 1.97% from other races, and 1.46% from two or more races. 6.29% of the population were Hispanic or Latino of any race.

In 2000, there were 7,220 households out of which 15.0% have children under the age of 18 living with them, 34.7% are married couples living together, 9.7% have a female householder with no husband present, and 52.6% are non-families. 46.1% of all households were made up of individuals and 26.1% have someone living alone who is 65 years of age or older. The average household size was 1.88 and the average family size was 2.60.

In 2000, in the city the population was spread out with 14.5% under the age of 18, 6.9% from 18 to 24, 24.5% from 25 to 44, 21.2% from 45 to 64, and 32.9% who are 65 years of age or older. The median age was 48 years. For every 100 females there were 87.8 males. For every 100 females age 18 and over, there were 84.4 males.

In 2000, the median income for a household in the city was $30,574, and the median income for a family was $40,701. Males had a median income of $29,151 versus $23,125 for females. The per capita income for the city was $21,139. About 7.8% of families and 11.2% of the population were below the poverty line, including 17.5% of those under age 18 and 9.1% of those age 65 or over.

== Economy ==
Stuart hosts one of the two Florida Department of Health offices in Martin County, the other being in Indiantown.

Various businesses cater to tourists, such as fishing charters, boating charters, sailing, cruises, SCUBA and snorkeling, and nature tours. Stuart contends for the title of “The Sailfish Capital of the World” with many local fishing guides specializing in that species.

=== Top employers ===
According to the city's 2011 Comprehensive Annual Financial Report, the top employers in the Stuart area are:

#	Employer	# of Employees
1	Martin Health System	2,825
2	Martin County School District	2,566
3	Martin County	1,566
4	Publix	1,276
5	State of Florida	637
6	iVox Solutions	532
7	TurboCombustor Technology	420
8	Winn-Dixie	329
9	Liberator Medical Supply	319
10	Florida Power & Light	303

== Arts and culture ==
=== Points of interest ===
Notable historic properties in downtown in range from the early 1880s to 1940s, representing a mix of Beaux-Arts, colonial revival, Spanish mediterranean, Art Deco, frame vernacular, masonry vernacular architecture styles.

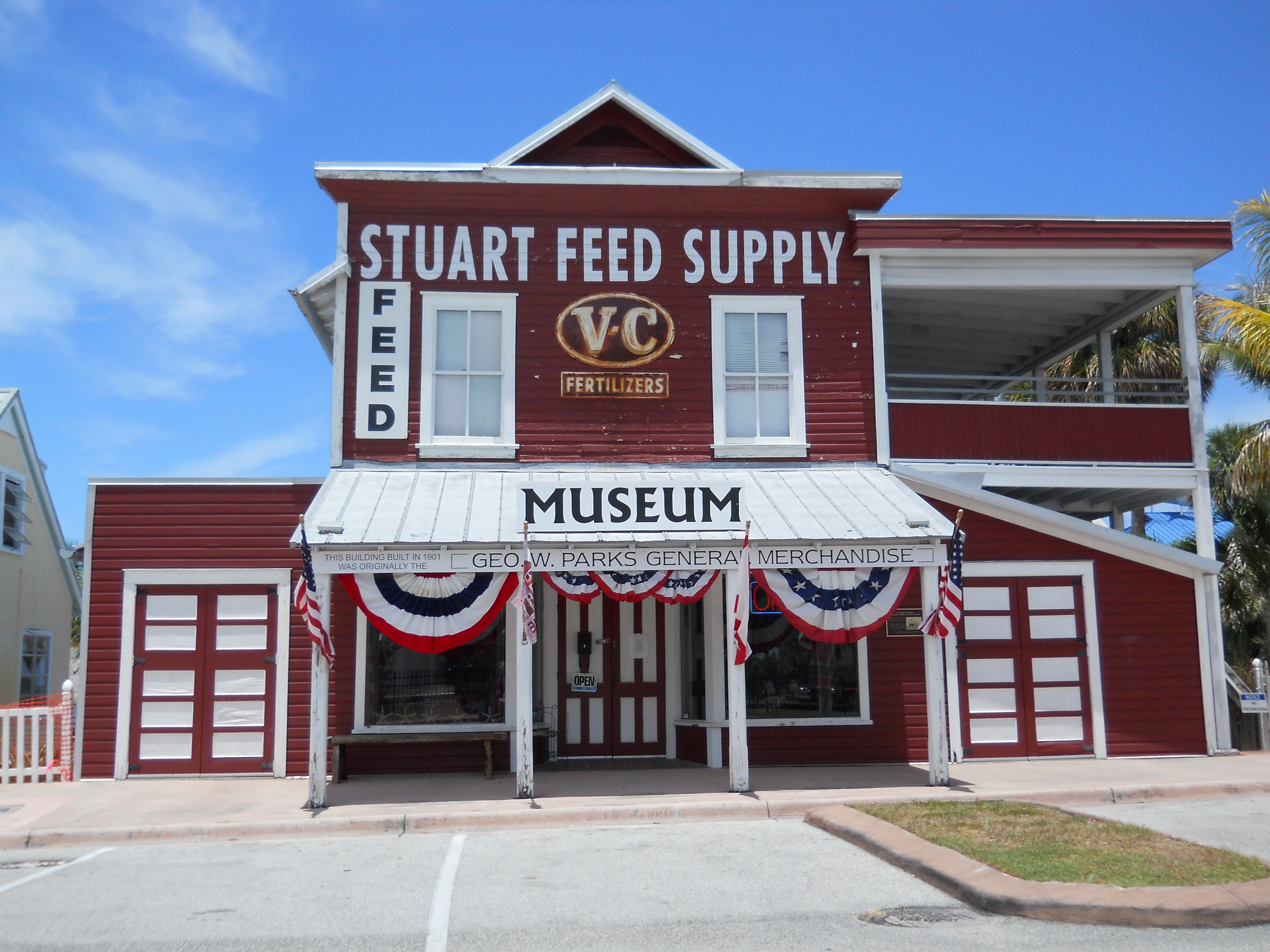
Stuart Heritage Museum

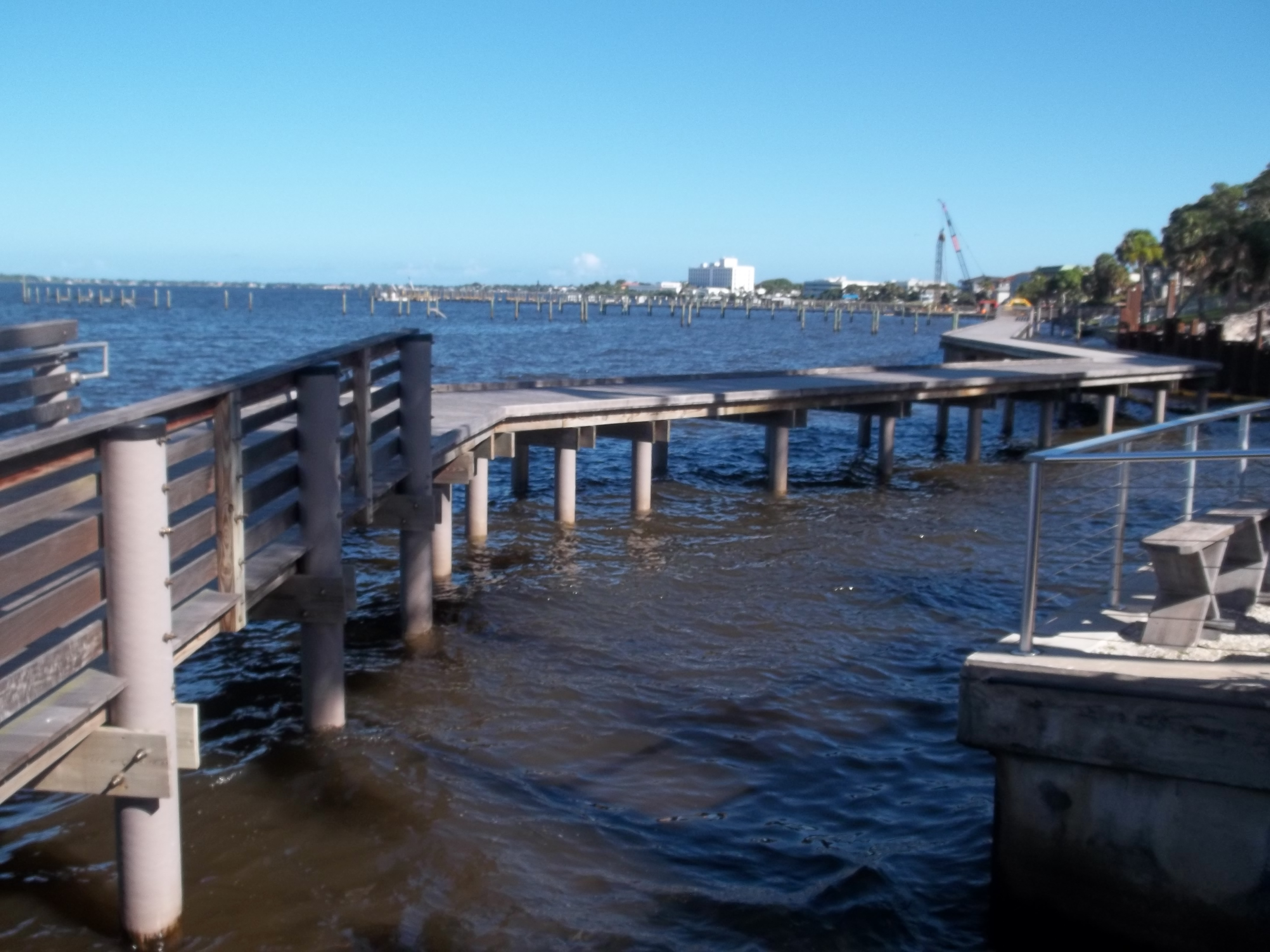
Stuart Riverwalk, 2018

- Audubon of Martin County
- Lyric Theatre
- Stuart Heritage Museum
- Elliott Museum
- Krueger House, a historic house on the National Register of Historic Places
- The Barn Theatre
- Geoffrey C. Smith Galleries
- Tropical Ranch Botanical Garden
- Florida Oceanographic Coastal Center
- Environmental Studies Council
- Sailfish Splash Waterpark

== Education ==
Public education in Stuart is administered by the Martin County School District.

== Infrastructure ==
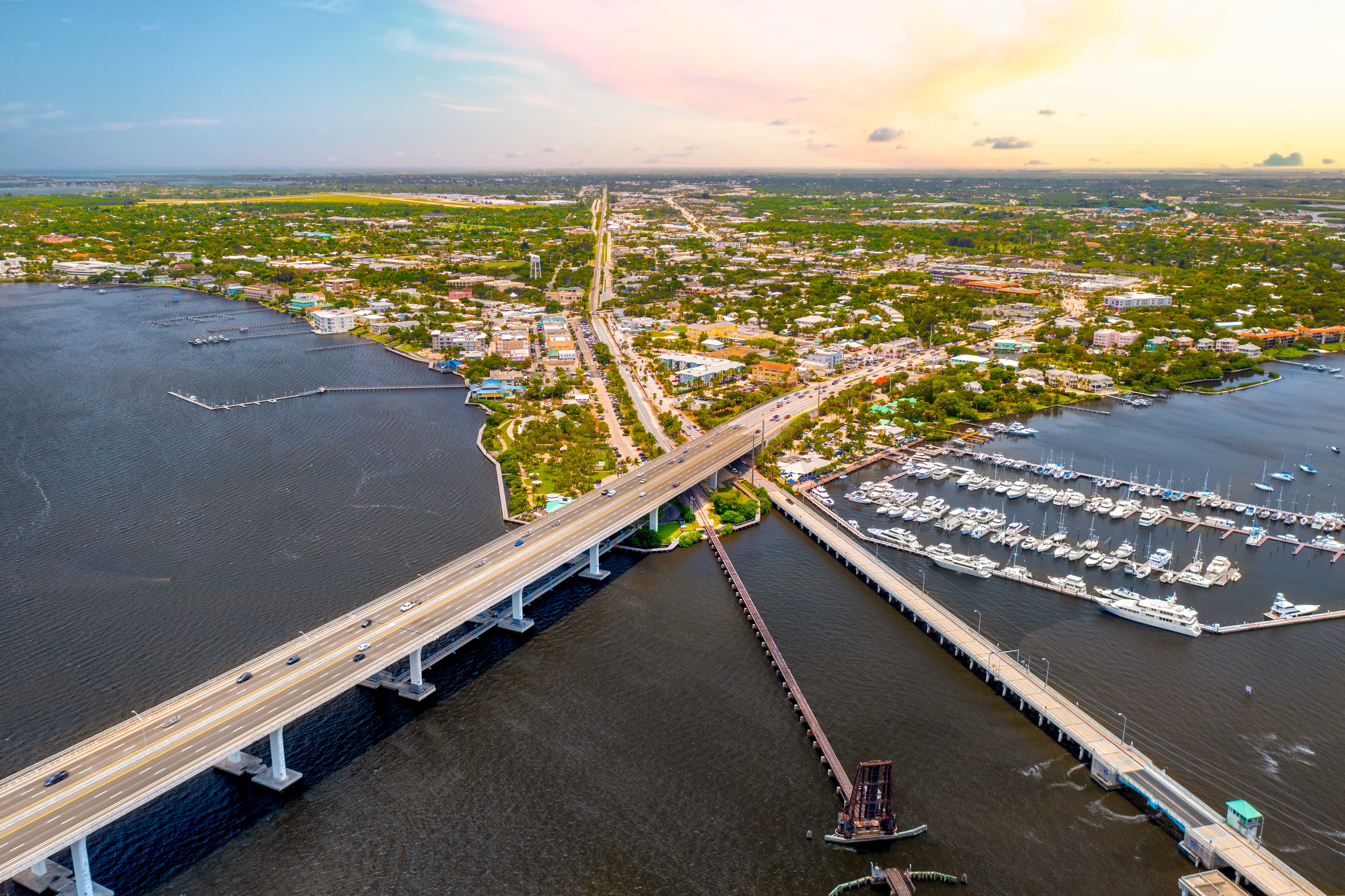
Roosevelt Bridge and Stuart City Downtown

=== Transportation ===
Witham Field is a public-use airport located one mile southeast of the central business district owned by Martin County.

US 1 passes northwest–southeast through Stuart. The coastal route A1A heads east from Stuart towards Hutchinson Island, and the road heads southeast out of Stuart. SR 76 heads south from the city, and SR 714 heads west from the city.

Local bus service is provided by Martin County Public Transit (MARTY). Stuart also operates a free courtesy tram throughout downtown.

Stuart has a yacht club and several marinas serving private crafts of various sizes.

Until 1968 the Florida East Coast Railway operated Jacksonville to Miami service, with a station stop in Stuart. Until 1963 long-distance passenger trains included the Illinois Central Railroad's City of Miami and the Louisville & Nashville Railroad's South Wind both heading from Chicago; and they included the Atlantic Coast Line Railroad's East Coast Champion, the Havana Special, and the winter-only Florida Special originating from New York.

In 2023, Brightline, an inter-city rail route that currently runs between Miami and Orlando, announced that it was looking for sites for a new station on the Treasure Coast. On March 4, 2024, Brightline officially announced that an infill station on the Treasure Coast would be built in Stuart. The current plan sees the station beginning service by 2028.

Brightline trains cross the St. Lucie River on the Florida East Coast Railroad Bridge. Close coordination between rail and water traffic is necessary at this bascule bridge.

== Notable people ==
- Jason Aldean, musician
- Dan Bakkedahl, correspondent on The Daily Show
- Paul Bley, jazz pianist
- Cynthia S. Burnett-Haney (1840–1932), educator, temperance reformer
- Nelson Burton Jr., professional bowler and longtime TV analyst
- Kelly Carrington, Playboy Playmate October 2008
- James Gould Cozzens, Pulitzer Prize-winning author
- Derrill M. Daniel, US Army major general
- James Davis, professional football player
- Ralph Evinrude, CEO of Outboard Motor Company with a test facility in Stuart, married Frances Langford
- Derek Fathauer, professional golfer who currently plays on the PGA Tour
- Cleveland Gary, professional football player
- Whitney Gaskell, novelist
- Ed Hearn, Major League Baseball player and motivational speaker
- Grant Horvat, golfer and YouTuber
- Davy Jones, musician with The Monkees
- Chris Marquette, actor
- John McHale, player and executive in Major League Baseball
- Corey McIntyre, professional football player
- Rusty Meacham, former Major League Baseball player
- Nicole Melichar, professional tennis player
- Vaughn Monroe, big band singer
- Zack Mosley, cartoonist and creator of The Adventures of Smilin' Jack
- Tori Penso, soccer referee
- Scott Proctor, former Major League Baseball player
- Judge Reinhold, actor
- Kathy Rinaldi, professional tennis player
- Lee Rinker, PGA Tour golfer
- Roger Schank, leading visionary in artificial intelligence, cognitive science, and learning theory
- Will Sheehey, professional basketball player
- Bryan Silas, racing driver

== Stuart in popular culture ==
In 1973, the movie Little Laura and Big John, a highly fictionalized version of the true story of John Ashley and Laura Upthegrove, was filmed in Stuart.
