= Hobe Mountain =

Landform in Florida, United States

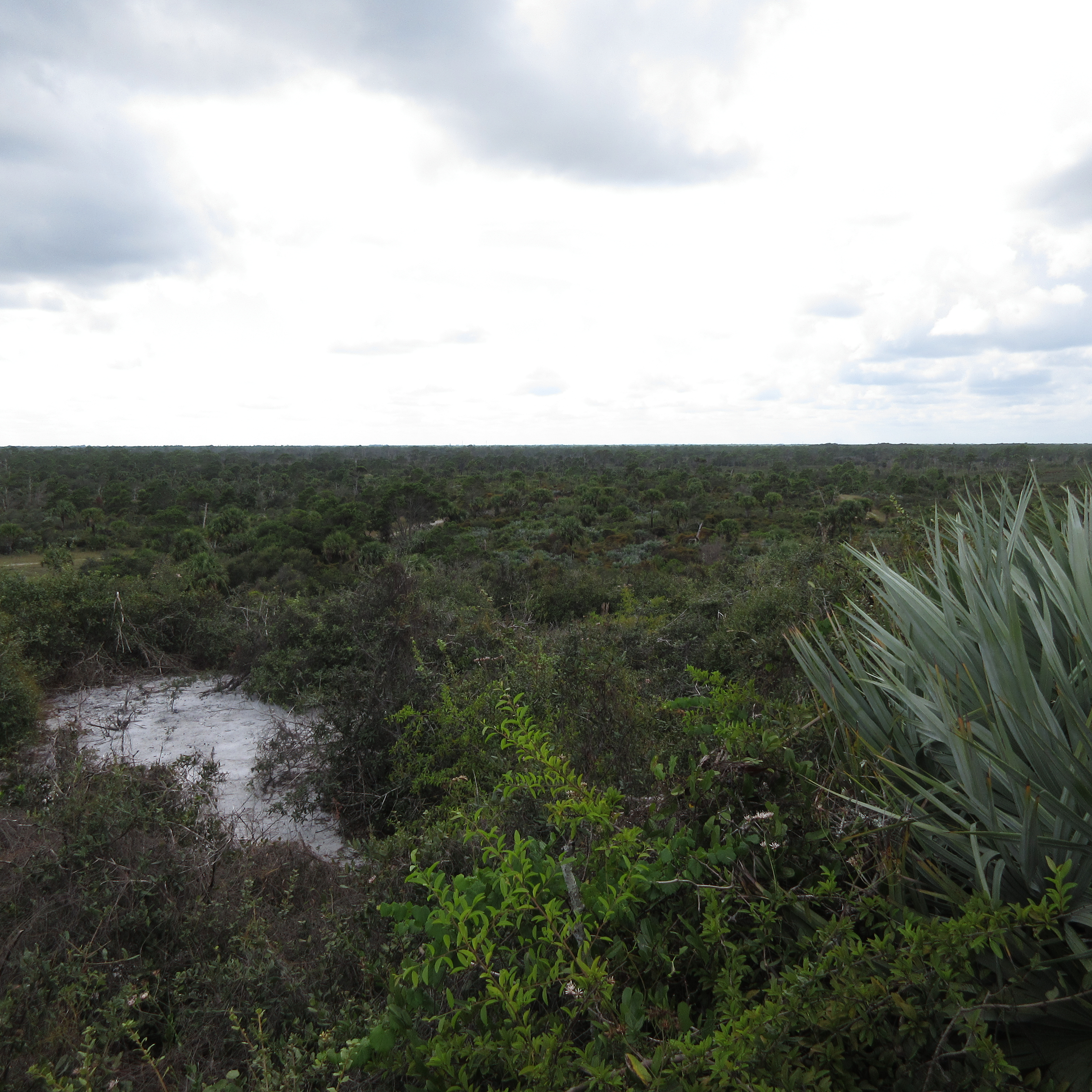
- View from atop Hobe Mountain

Highest point
- Elevation: 86 ft (26 m)
- Coordinates: 27°1′5″N 80°6′41″W

Geography
- Location within Florida Location within the United States
- Location: Martin County, Florida, United States
- Parent range: Atlantic Coastal Ridge

Geology
- Rock age: Pleistocene
- Mountain type: Sedimentary

Climbing
- Easiest route: Boardwalk

Hobe Mountain is a landform in Hobe Sound, Martin County, Florida, United States, within Jonathan Dickinson State Park.

== Characteristics ==
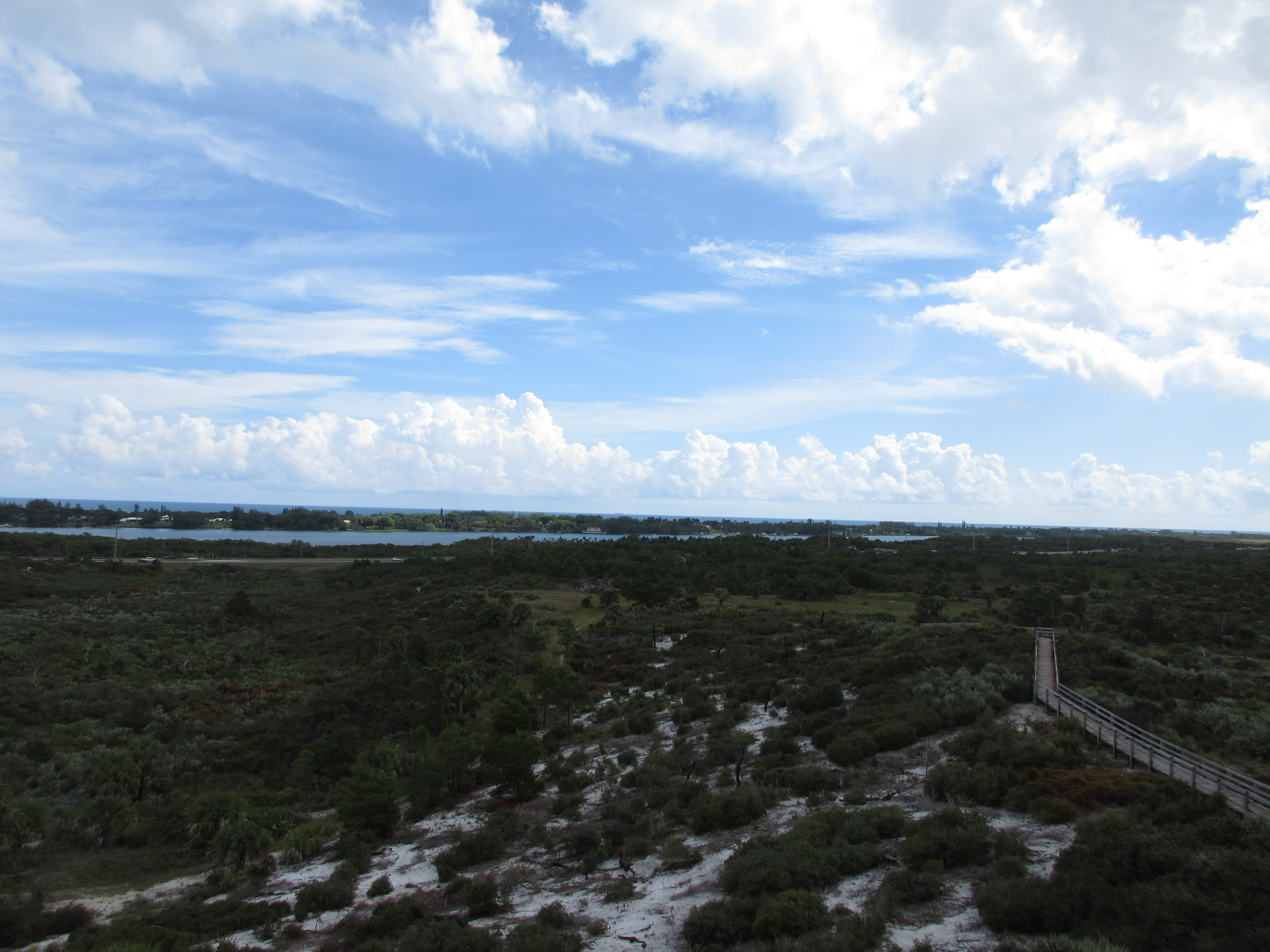
Looking east toward Jupiter Island

The hill occupies part of the Atlantic Coastal Ridge, a series of old dunes and beach ridges running latitudinally through the eastern side of the park, along and just west of U.S. Route 1. A relic of Pleistocene sea levels, it hosts arid, fine, well-drained soil. At 86 ft (26 m), Hobe Mountain marks the highest natural elevation locally and in South Florida below Lake Okeechobee. (Note: By contrast, mean elevation in Martin County is about 20 ft (6.1 m).) Vegetatively it is covered by Florida scrub, mainly sand pine, oak, saw palmetto, and Florida rosemary; its high elevation and scrub community correlate with biodiversity, including endemic species such as the Florida dancing lady orchid, the Florida scrub lizard, and the Florida scrub jay.

== History ==
The hill, like nearby Hobe Sound and Jupiter, is named after the Jobe, a subgroup, synonym, or principal town of the Jaega people. The site was first identified as a marker by Spanish mariners and was later dubbed Ropa Tendida (alternatively Ropas Estendias) by Gabriel Díaz Vara y Calderón, bishop of Santiago de Cuba, in 1675, during the first Spanish occupation of Florida. At the time of British rule it was known as the Bleach Yard, a name mentioned by Bernard Romans. A map in 1776 described it as a "remarkable Land Mark", a "High Hill full of white spots" (bare ground). According to cartographer Charles Blacker Vignoles, both its Spanish and English names denoted its appearance at sea, its open patches resembling "linen spread out". It was also called Baldhead Mount (1767) for the same reason.

The sailors could see that area far out to sea and make note of all that white sand.

— Bessie DuBois, c.1977

In the late 18th and early 19th centuries the site was largely devoid of vegetation, except for bits of scrub. Later ecological succession filled in the gaps over time, such that the site's toponyms were transferred to a similar locale farther south by the 1840s. During World War II Camp Murphy occupied land at or near the site; the name Hobe Mountain dates to this time. Following the creation of Jonathan Dickinson State Park, a ranger tower was erected on the hilltop, drawing visitors. Today a 27-foot (8.2 m) observation platform stands on the site, affording a panoramic view of its environs, including the Atlantic Ocean and the Intracoastal Waterway.

== Gallery ==
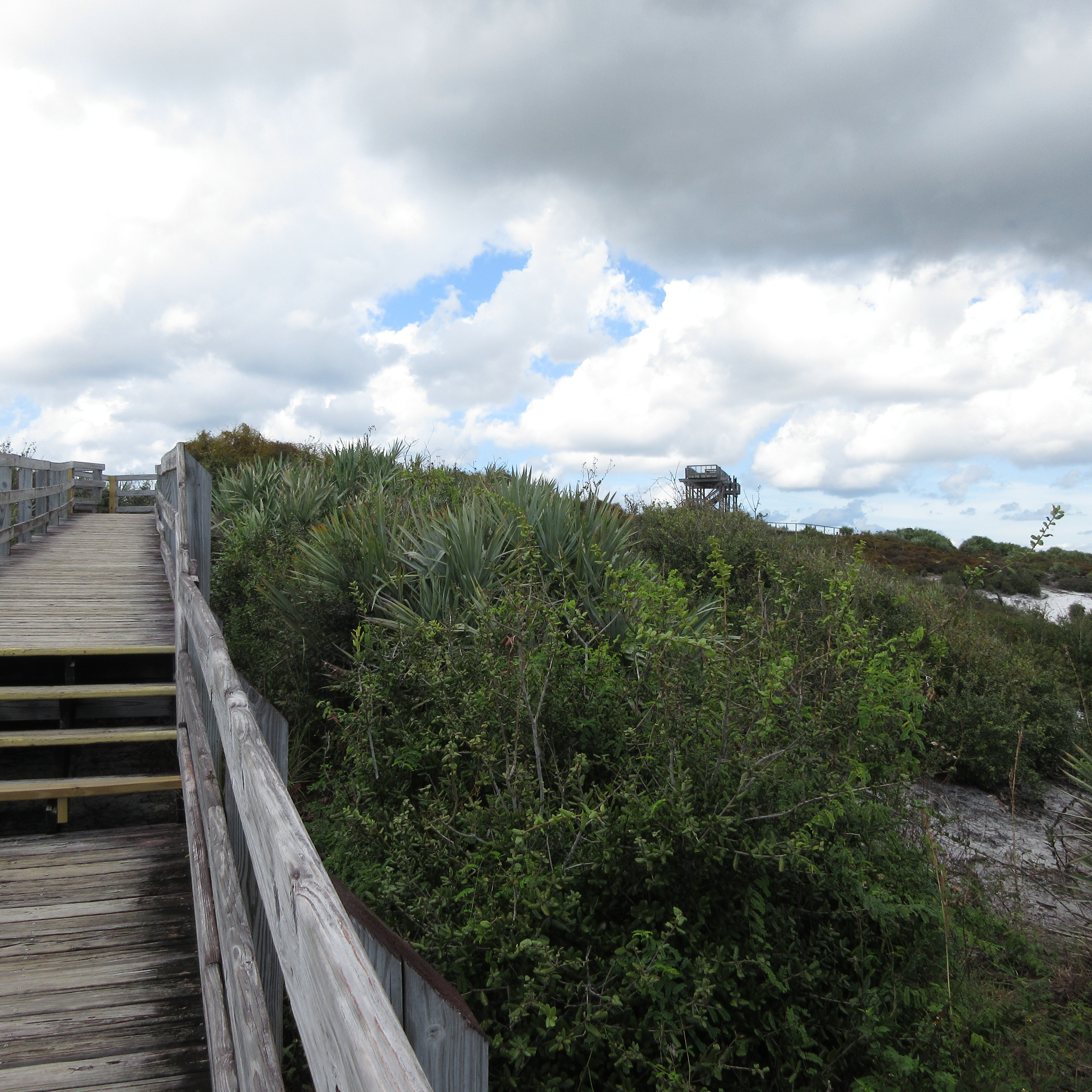
Boardwalk leading to the summit

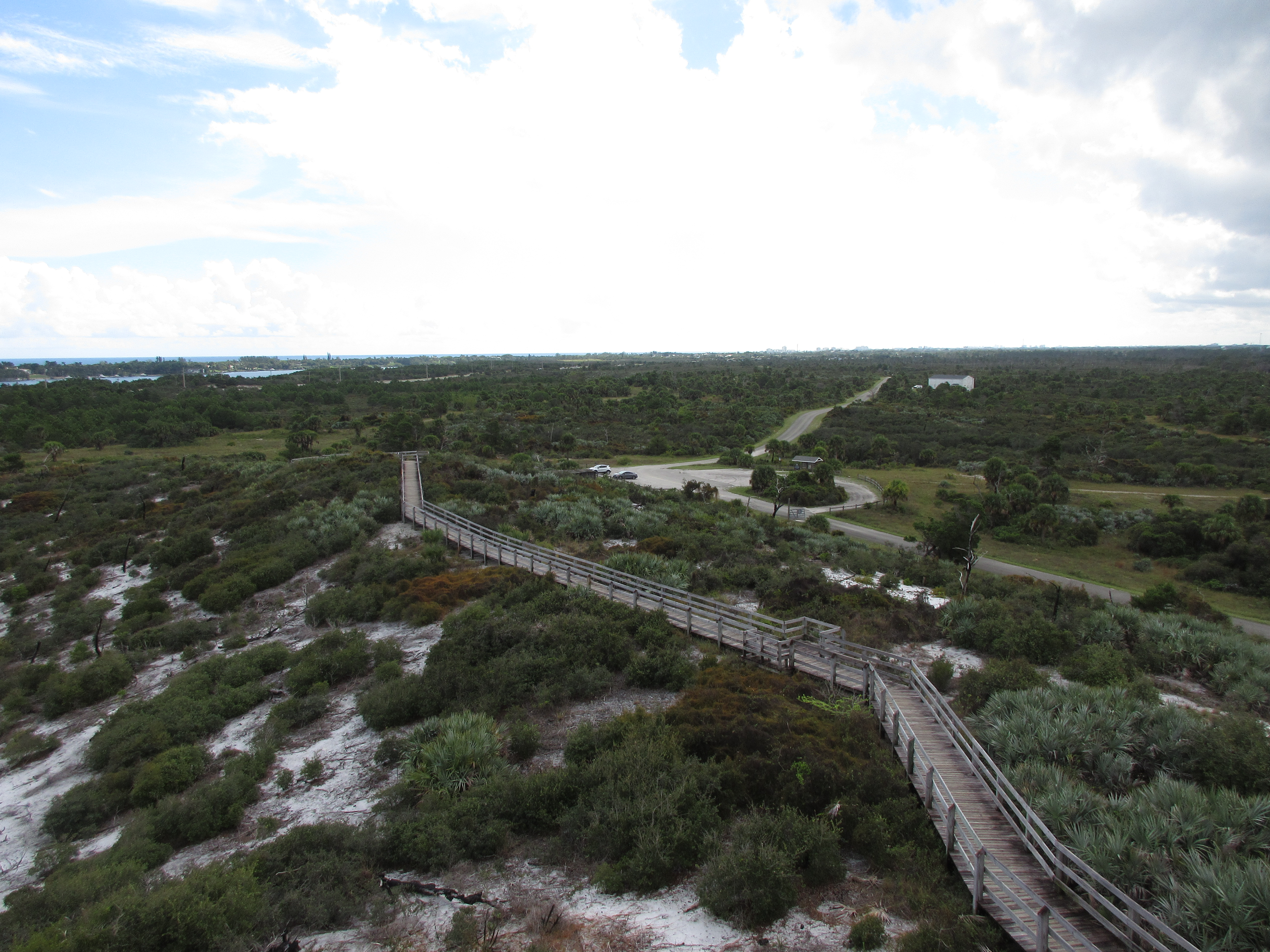
View of parking area from atop the ridge

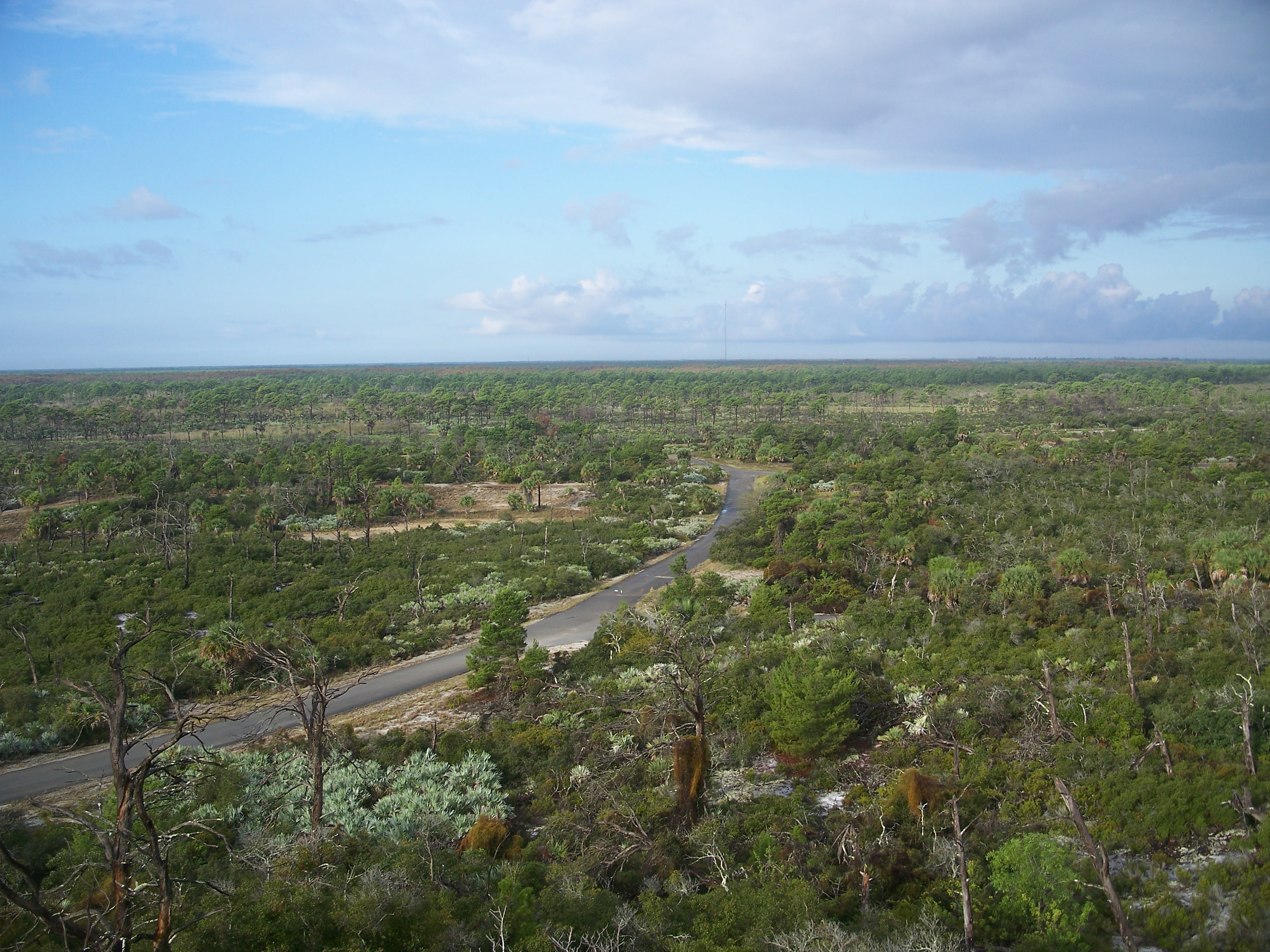
Looking west toward park interior

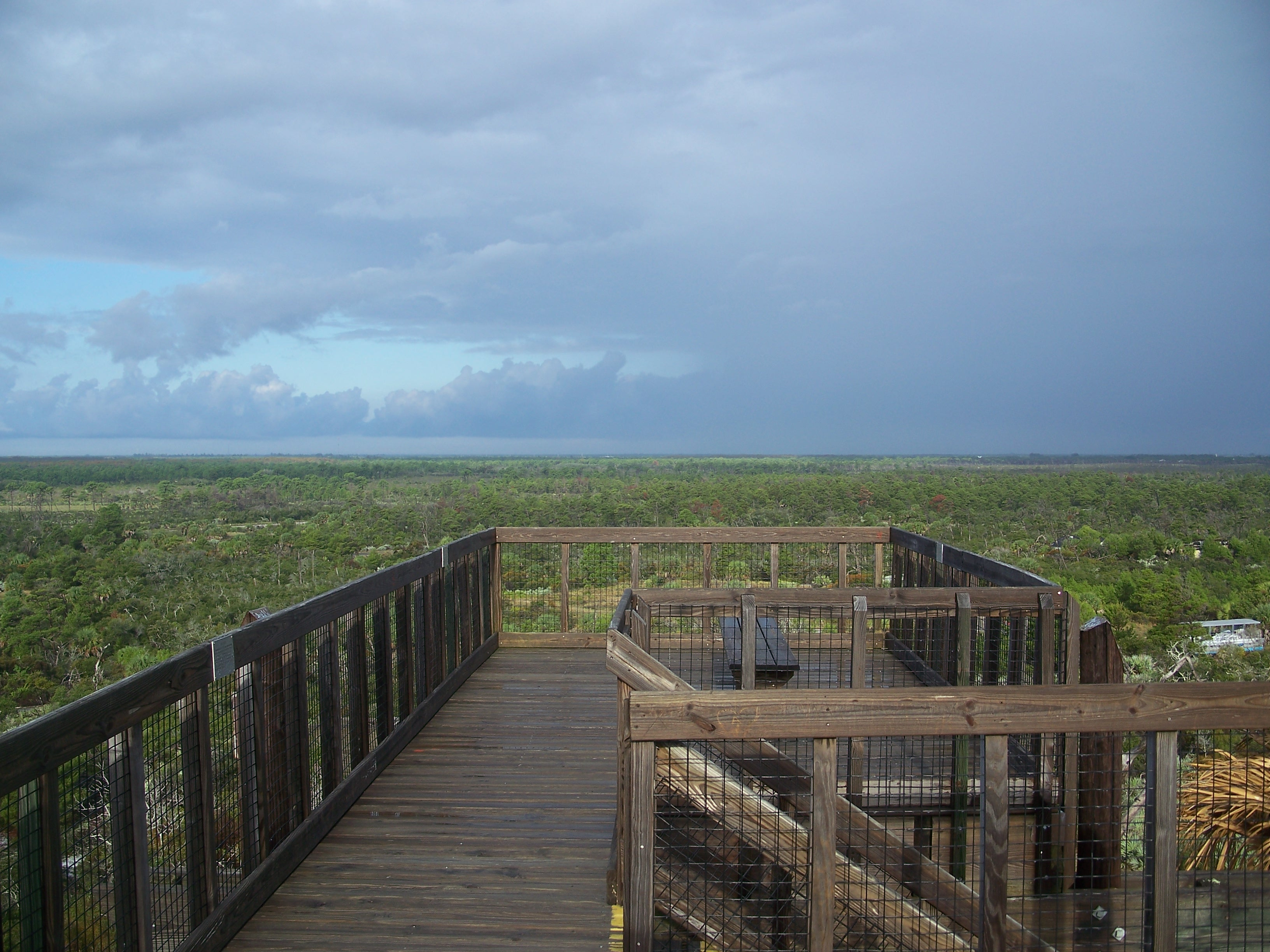
Overlook

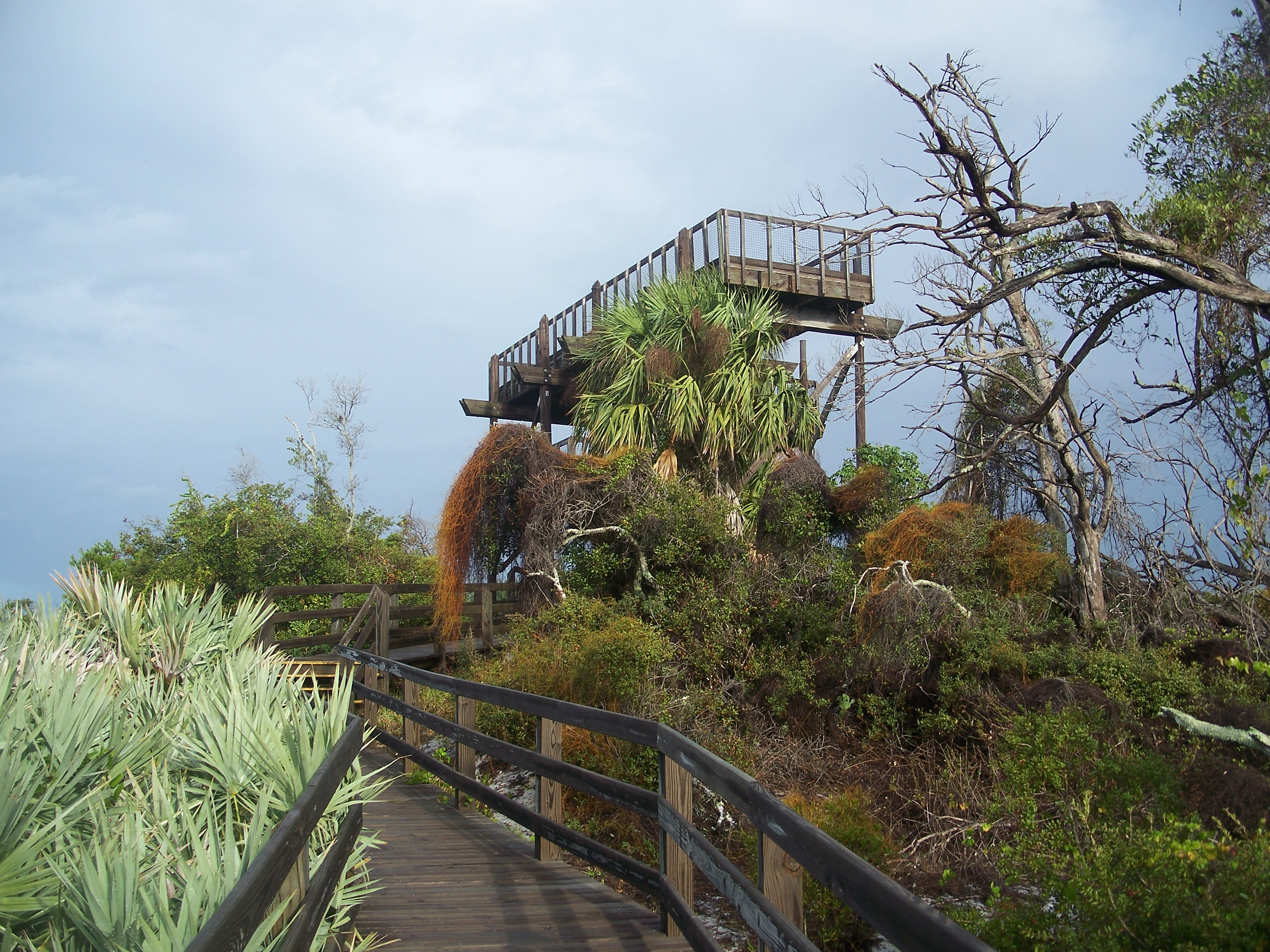
Observation tower
