= Trapper Nelson Zoo Historic District =

Historic district in Florida, United States

- U.S. National Register of Historic Places
- U.S. Historic district
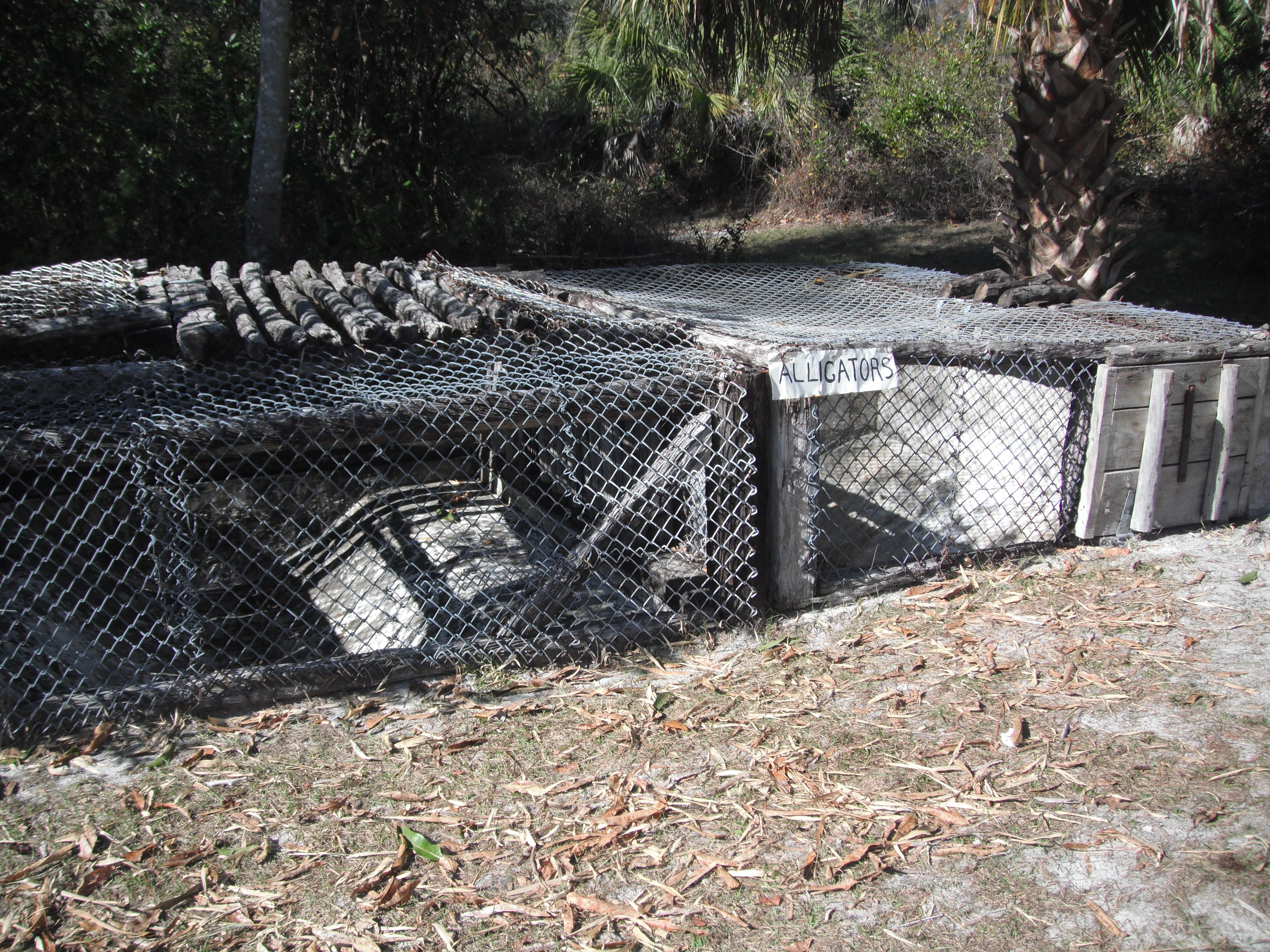
- Alligator pit at Nelson's hunting camp

- Location within Florida Location within the United States
- Nearest city: Hobe Sound, Florida
- Coordinates: 26°58′37″N 80°9′49″W
- Built: 1933
- Architect: Nelson, Vince "Trapper"
- NRHP reference No.: 06000918
- Added to NRHP: October 3, 2006

The Trapper Nelson Zoo Historic District, also known as Trapper Nelson Hunting Camp and Trapper Nelson Interpretive Site, is an historic district located south of Hobe Sound, Florida, in the United States. It is inside Jonathan Dickinson State Park at 16450 Southeast Federal Highway. On October 3, 2006, it was added to the National Register of Historic Places.

== History ==
Vince "Trapper" Nelson developed a zoo on his property in the 1950s, and his camp and zoo became popular tourist attractions, where such celebrities as Gene Tunney and Gary Cooper visited. He was known locally as the "Tarzan of the Loxahatchee". He was found dead in his cabin by a friend in 1968, and his death was ruled a suicide. His land was acquired by the state of Florida, and is now part of Jonathan Dickinson State Park.

After the land was converted to a park, but still unopen to the public, the camp was often vandalized. One of Nelson's tool sheds was burned down; the arsonist attempted to burn other buildings but was unsuccessful.

In April 1984, park rangers discovered Nelson's "treasure": a hiding place in his chimney held 5,005 coins, totaling $1,829.46. The coins ranged in date from the 1890s to the 1960s. A thorough search of the camp was conducted before revealing the find to the public, but nothing more was found.

The camp still stands today, with his cabin, a guest cabin, a chickee shelter, docks, a boathouse, and assorted cages from his zoo. There are also fruit trees that he planted, including surinam cherry, Java plum and wild almond.

== See also ==
- Loxahatchee River
- Jonathan Dickinson State Park
