= Jonathan Dickinson State Park =

Park in Florida, US

- IUCN category V (protected landscape/seascape)
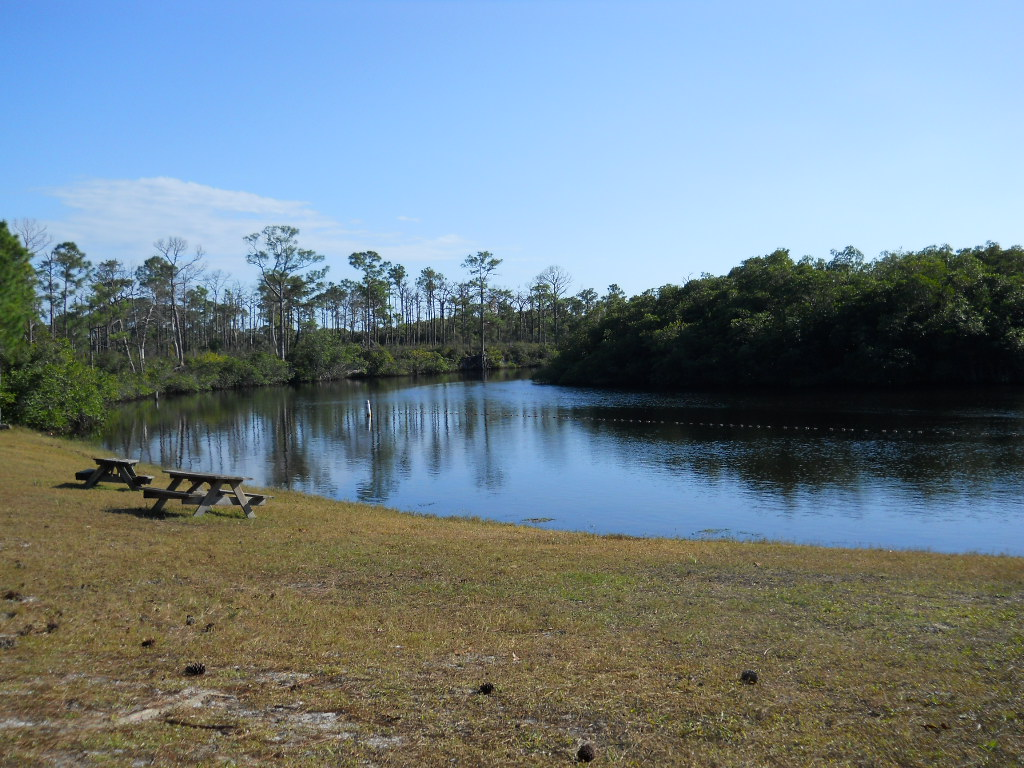
- Loxahatchee River inside the park

- Location within Florida Location within the United States
- Interactive map of Jonathan Dickinson State Park
- Location: Martin County, Florida, United States
- Nearest city: Hobe Sound / Tequesta, Florida
- Coordinates: 27°00′22″N 80°07′44″W
- Area: 11,500 acres (47 km^{2})
- Established: 1950
- Visitors: 172,000 (in 2004)
- Governing body: Florida Department of Environmental Protection

Jonathan Dickinson State Park is a Florida State Park, and historic site located in Martin County, Florida, between Hobe Sound and Tequesta. The park includes the Elsa Kimbell Environmental Education and Research Center and a variety of natural habitats: sand pine scrub, pine flatwoods, mangroves, and river swamps. The Loxahatchee River, designated a National Wild and Scenic River in 1985 (the first in Florida), runs through the park. The park is also along the Ocean to Lake Trail. The park is at 16450 S.E. Federal Highway, Hobe Sound. The park is well known for its Camp Murphy Mountain Bike Trails.

== Conservation ==
Jonathan Dickinson State Park is home to many significant and endangered species. It has several unique factors that are conducive to the survival of several rare species, amphibians in particular. According to Montreat College professor Joshua Holbrook, the wetlands of JD State Park have more species of amphibians than the Everglades do. Endangered barking tree frogs, pine woods tree frogs, and Florida scrub jays are found in Jonathan Dickinson State Park. JD State Park contains one of the three disjunct populations of the endemic four-petal pawpaw.

In 2024, a controversial plan to build three golf courses on the state park was rejected after public outcry. Nonetheless, the park ecosystem remains at risk largely due to human presence.

== History ==
The park is named after Jonathan Dickinson, a Quaker merchant who was shipwrecked in 1696, with his family and others, on the Florida coast near the present-day park. He wrote a journal describing their encounters with local tribes, and their journey up the coast to St. Augustine.

The United States Army established Camp Murphy, a top-secret radar training school, in the area that is now the park, in 1942. The camp included over 1,000 buildings, and housed more than 6,000 officers and soldiers. The camp was deactivated in 1944, after only two years of operation. Most of the camp buildings were torn down, but some of the building foundations remain. The property was transferred to the State of Florida in 1947, and opened as a state park in 1950.

A man known as Trapper Nelson homesteaded on the banks of the Loxahatchee River after coming to the area in the 1930s, living off the land trapping and selling furs. He soon became known as the Wildman of the Loxahatchee. After he died in 1968 the state acquired his land, and deeded it to the park.

== Recreational activities ==
Park amenities include bicycling, boat tours, boating, cabins, canoeing, fishing, hiking, horse trails, kayaking, picnicking areas, swimming, wildlife viewing and full camping facilities. It also has the Elsa Kimbell Environmental Education and Research Center, with exhibits about the park's natural and cultural history. The park operates a 44-passenger boat for tours of Trapper Nelson's homestead.

== In film ==
Jonathan Dickinson State Park was used to film the first segment of the second episode of BBC's Walking with Monsters, set in Late Carboniferous Kansas.

Popular Mountain bike channels on YouTube such as BKXC and BCPOV have featured the park's Camp Murphy Mountain Bike trails.

== Gallery ==
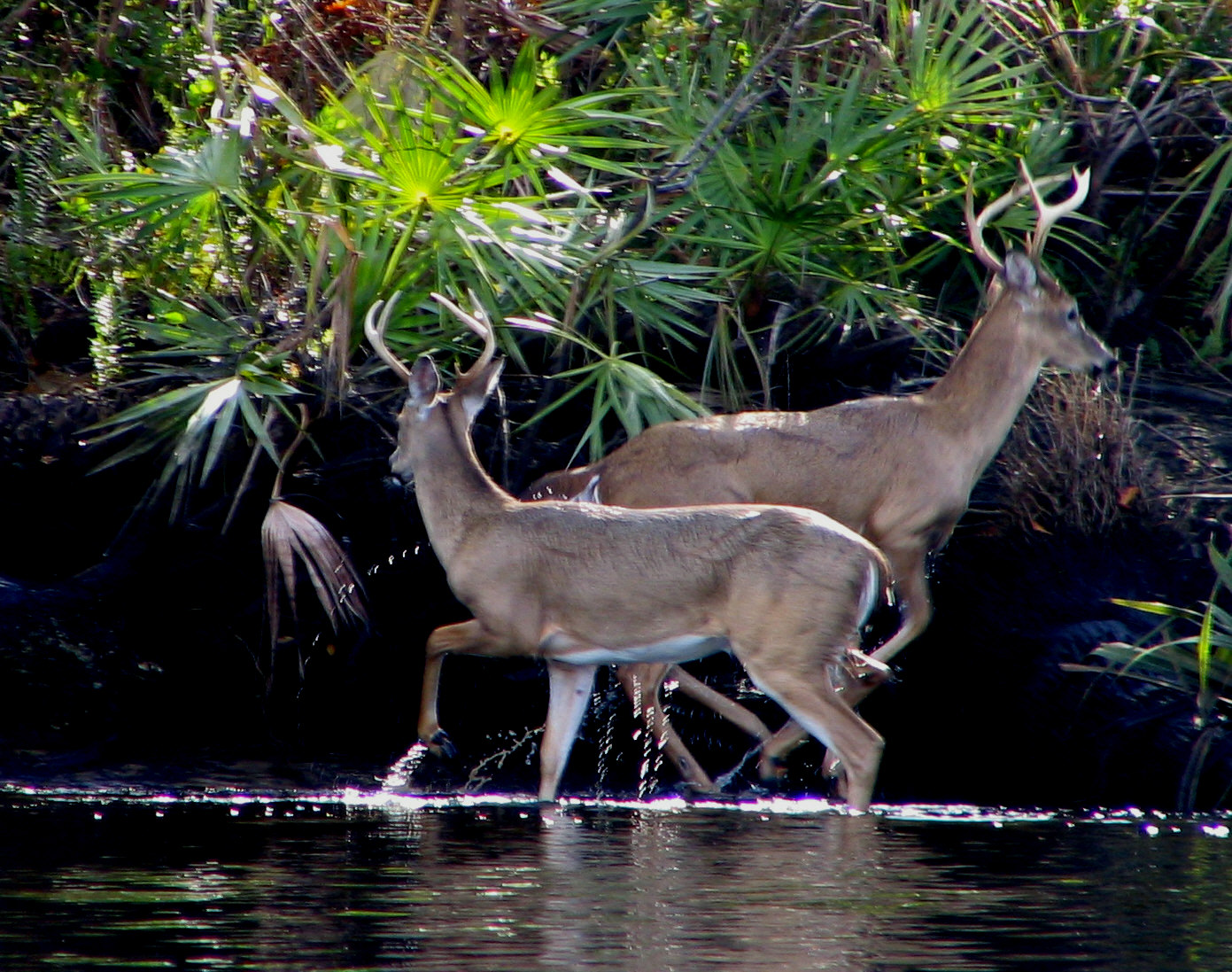
Two white-tailed bucks on the Loxahatchee River

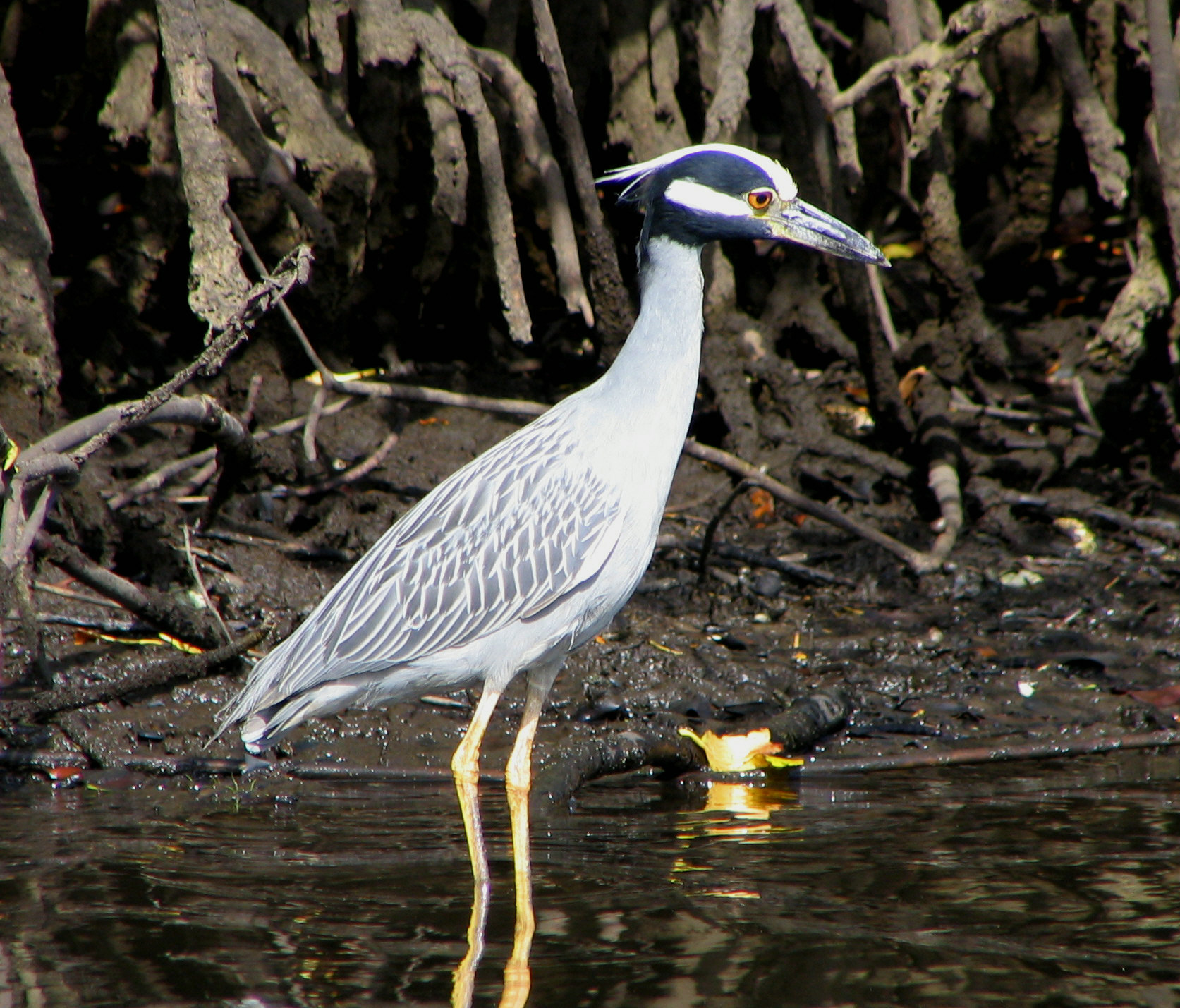
Yellow-crowned night heron on Kitching Creek

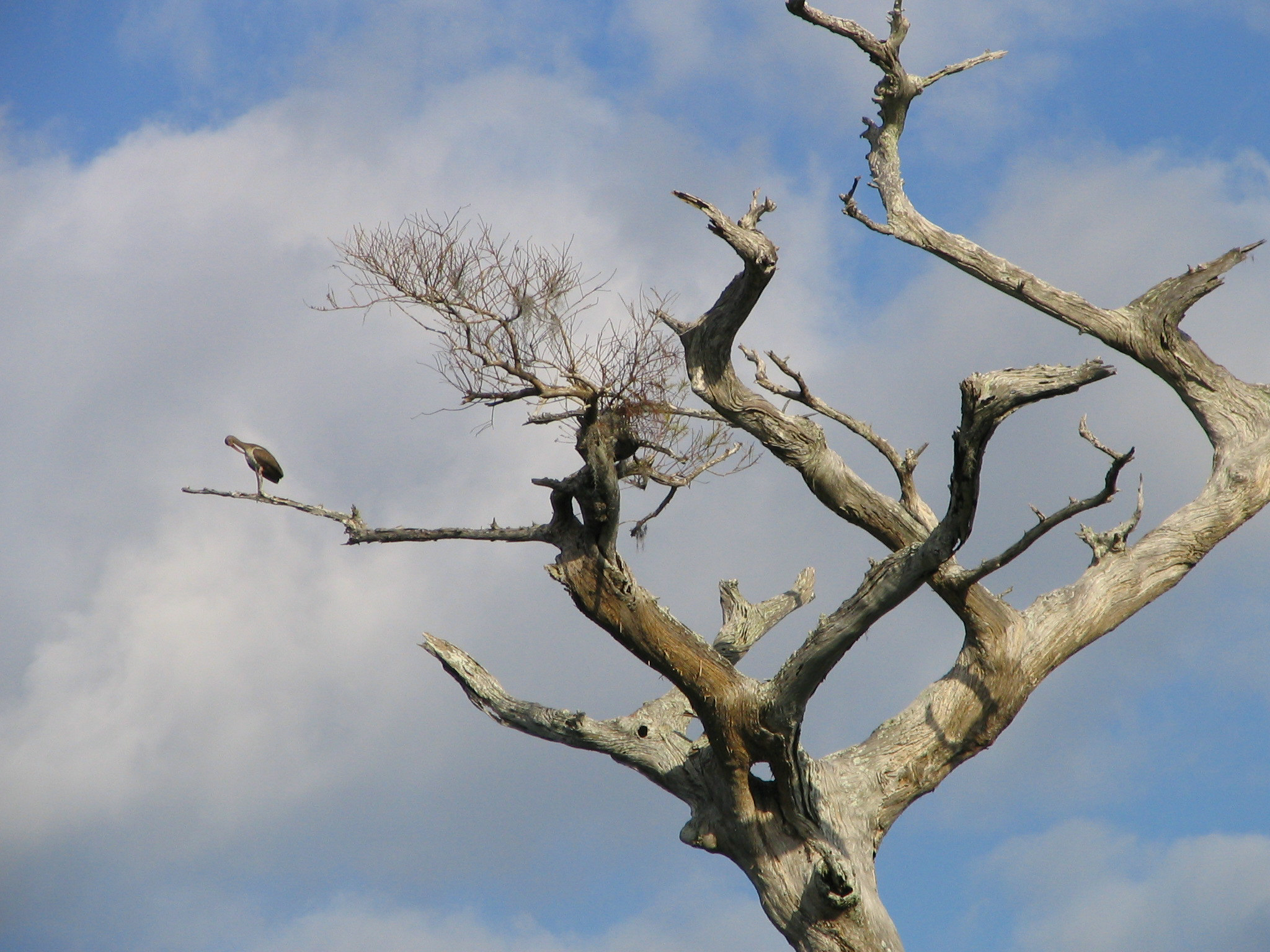
Ibis on the Loxahatchee

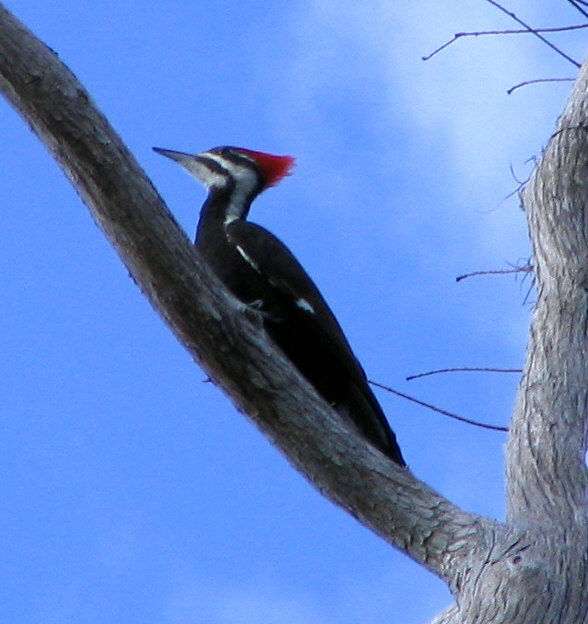
Pileated woodpecker on Kitching Creek

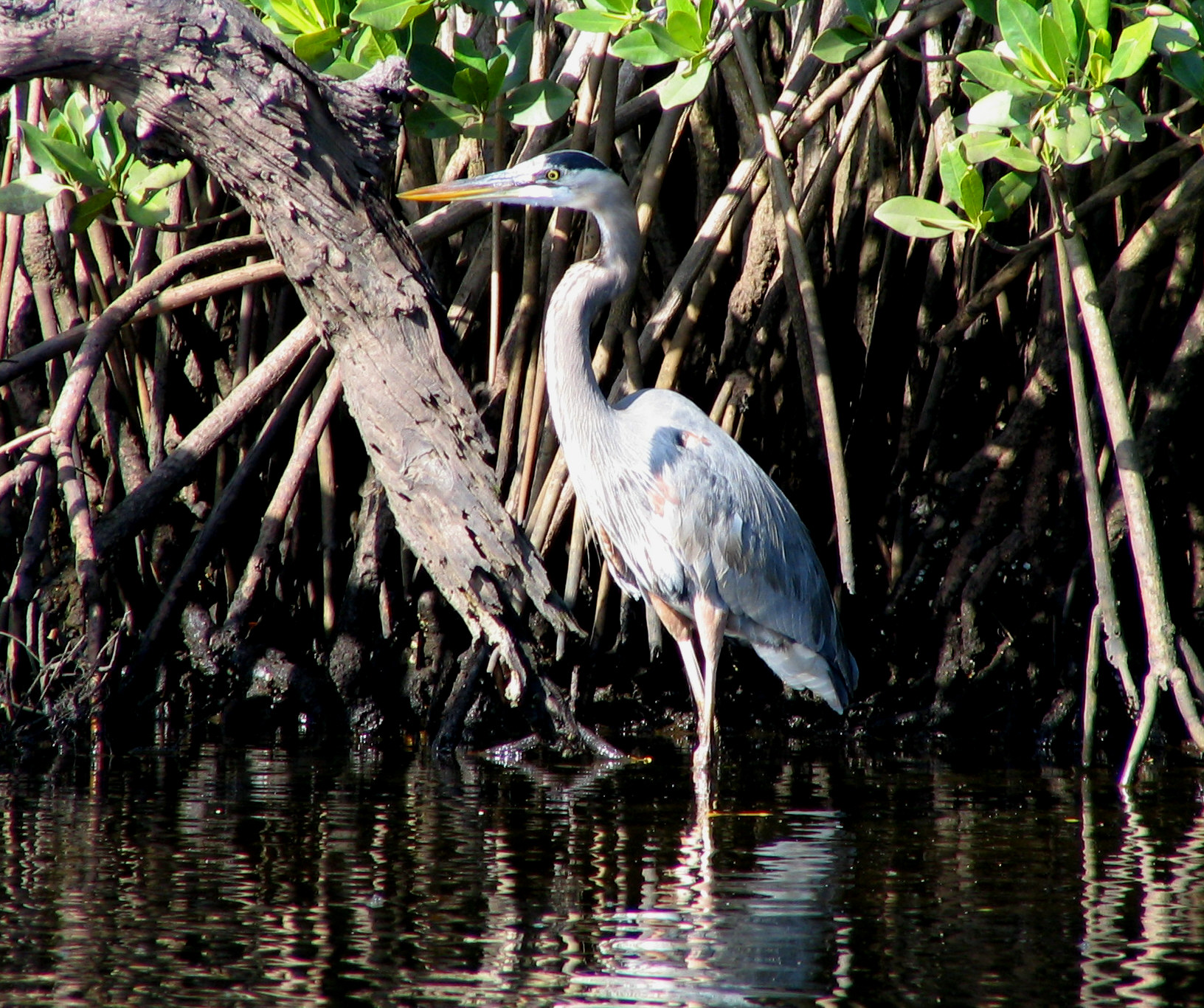
Great blue heron on the Loxahatchee

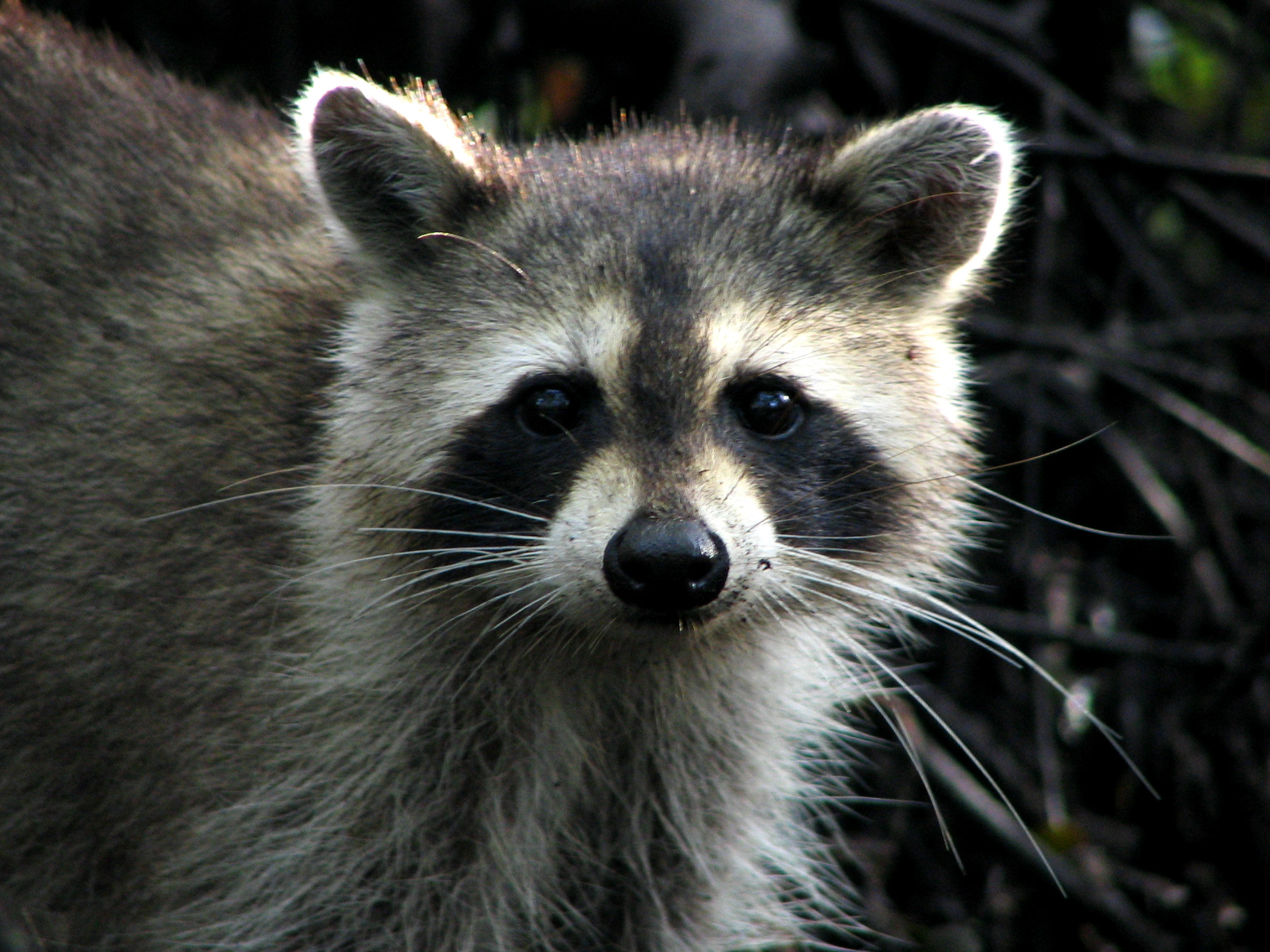
A raccoon

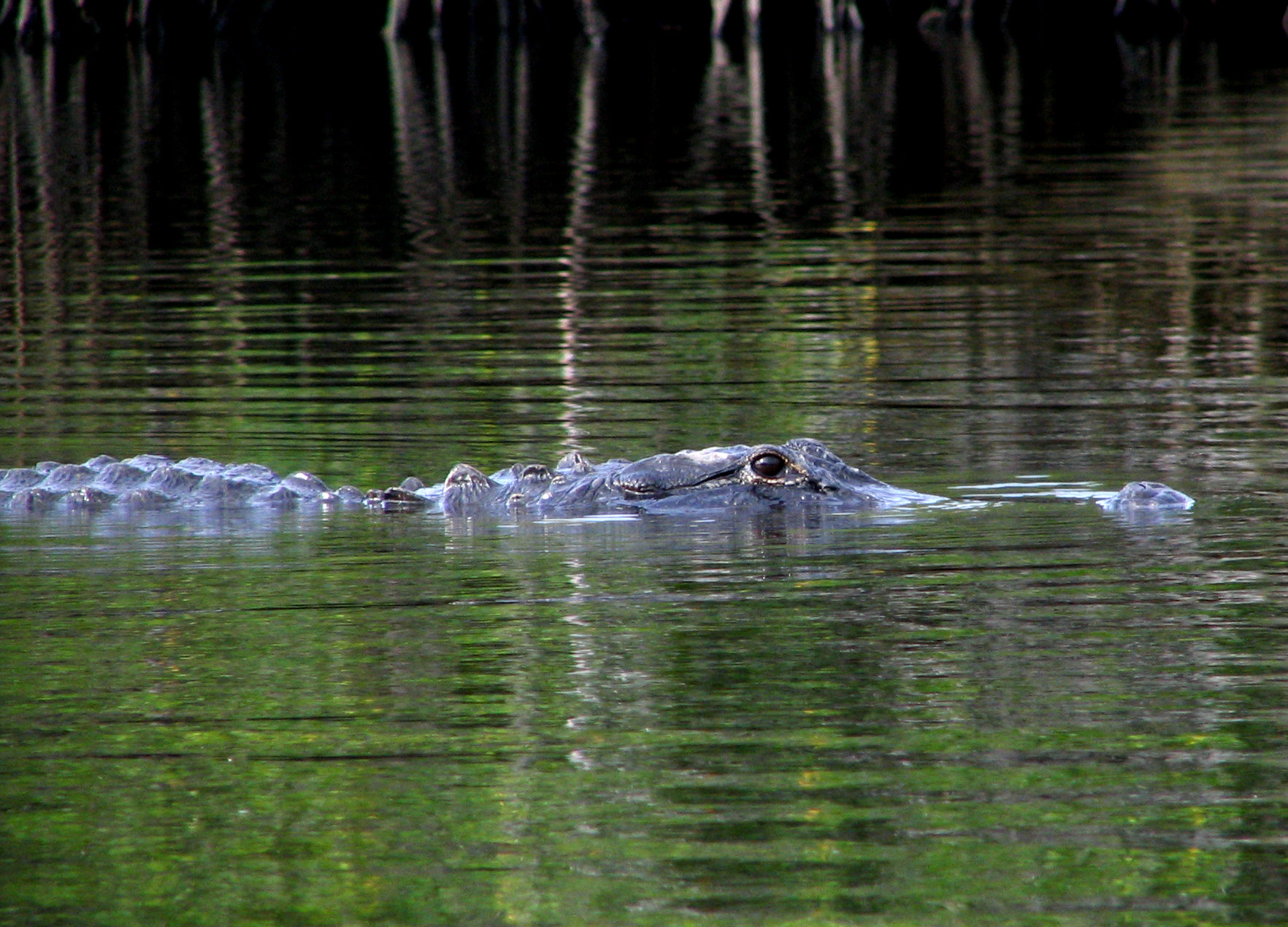
An alligator on the Loxahatchee

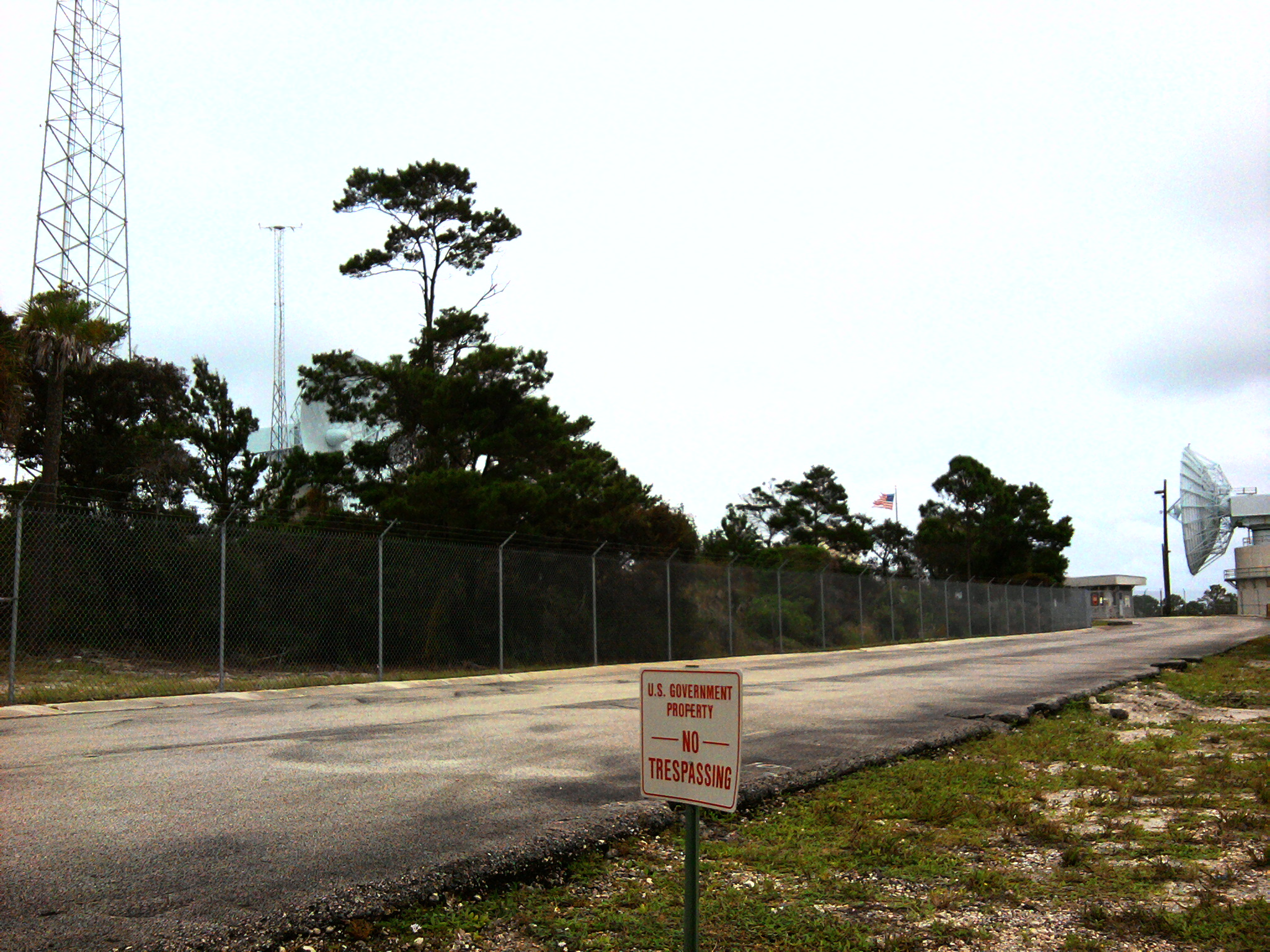
Jonathan Dickinson Missile Tracking Annex

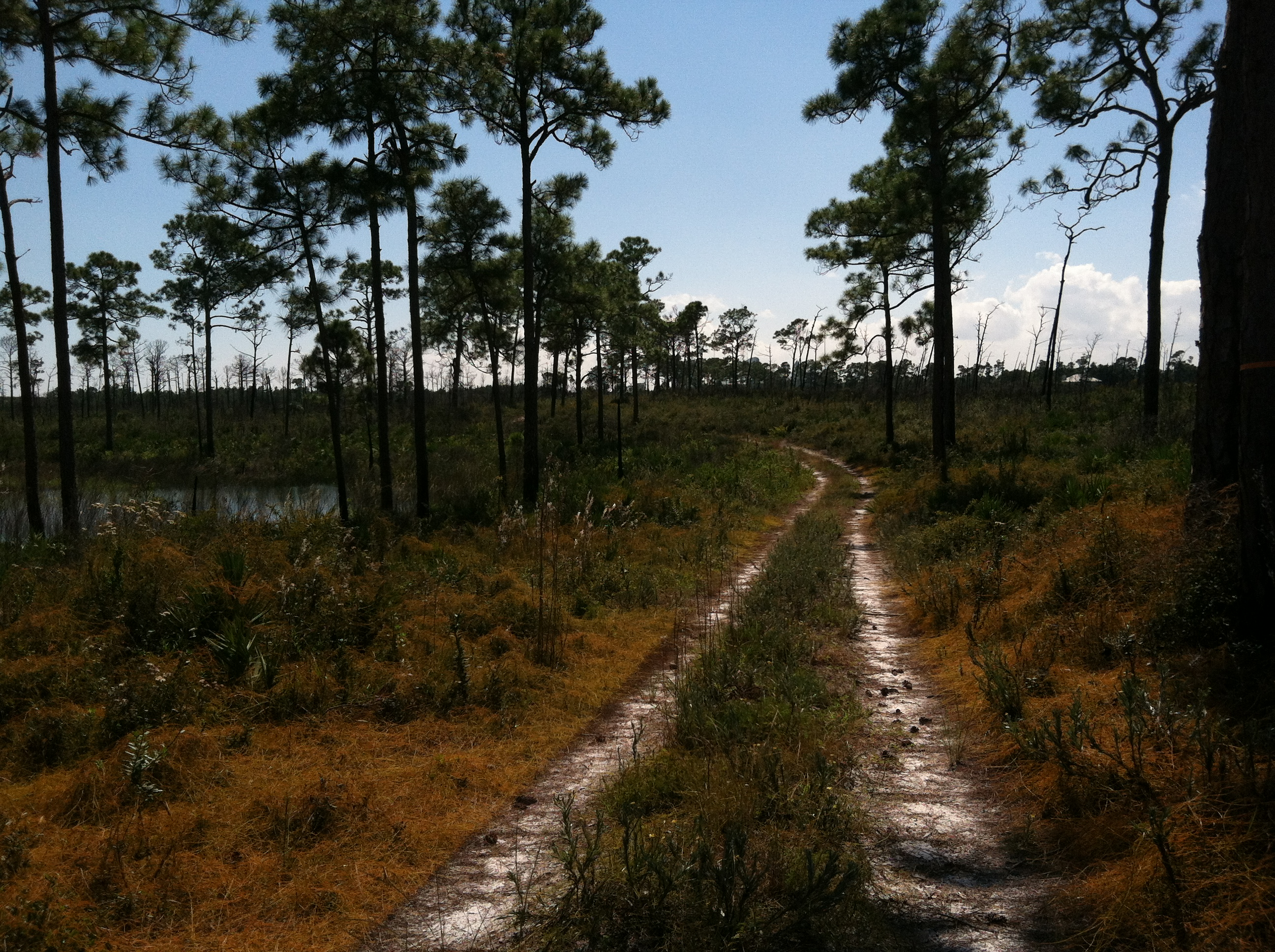
A dirt trail in the park

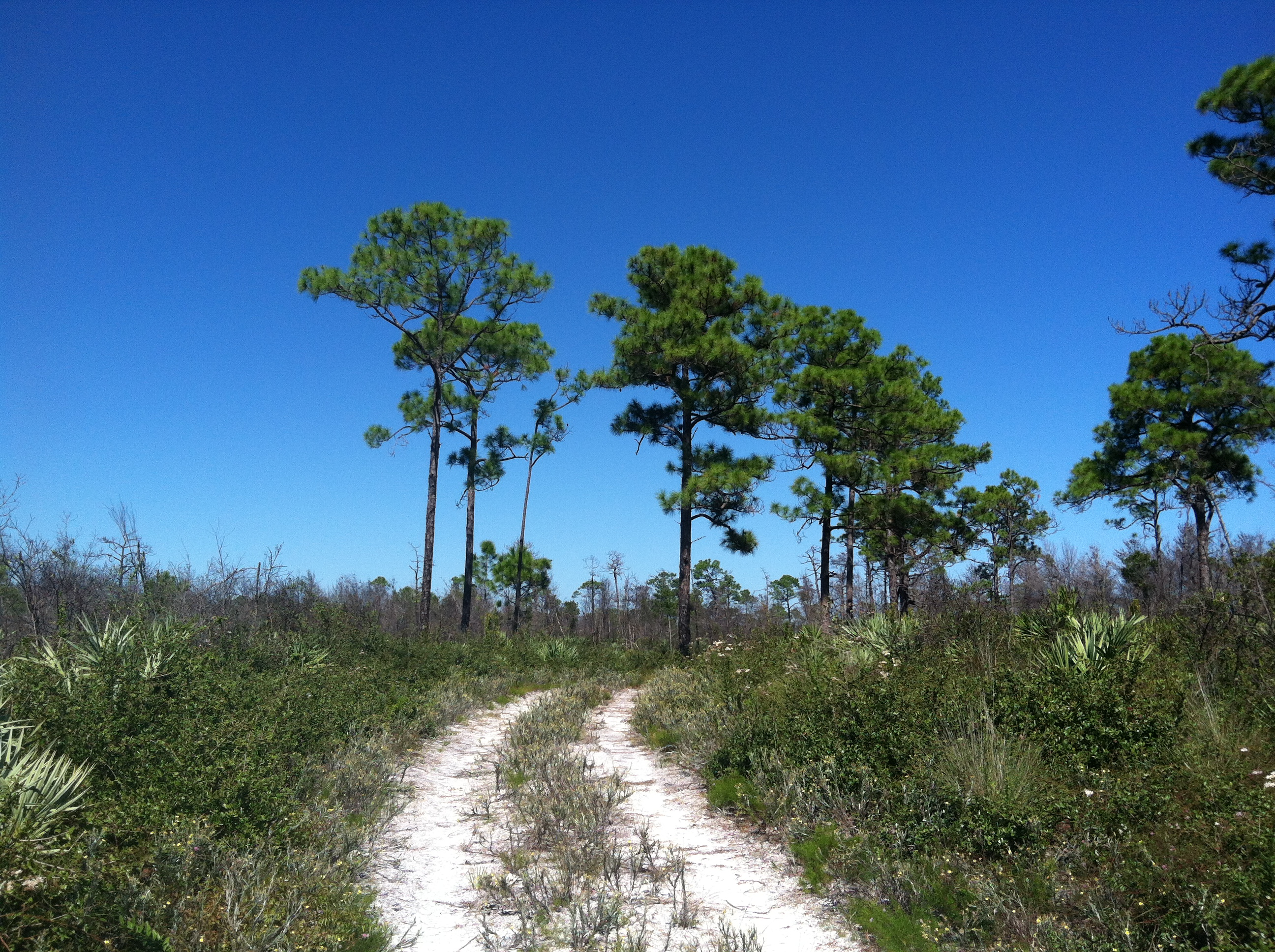
Trail through scrubby woods

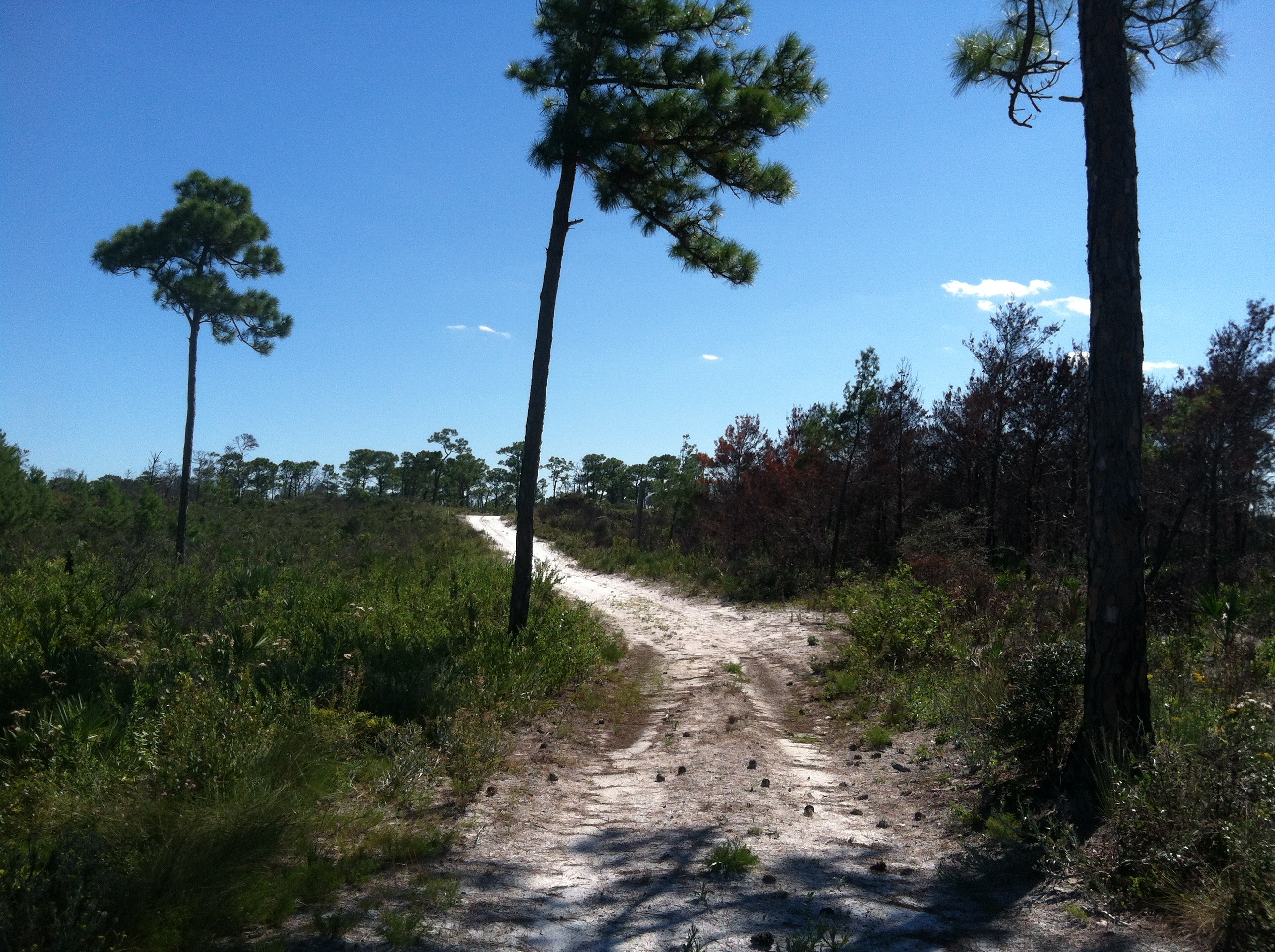
Trail between pine trees

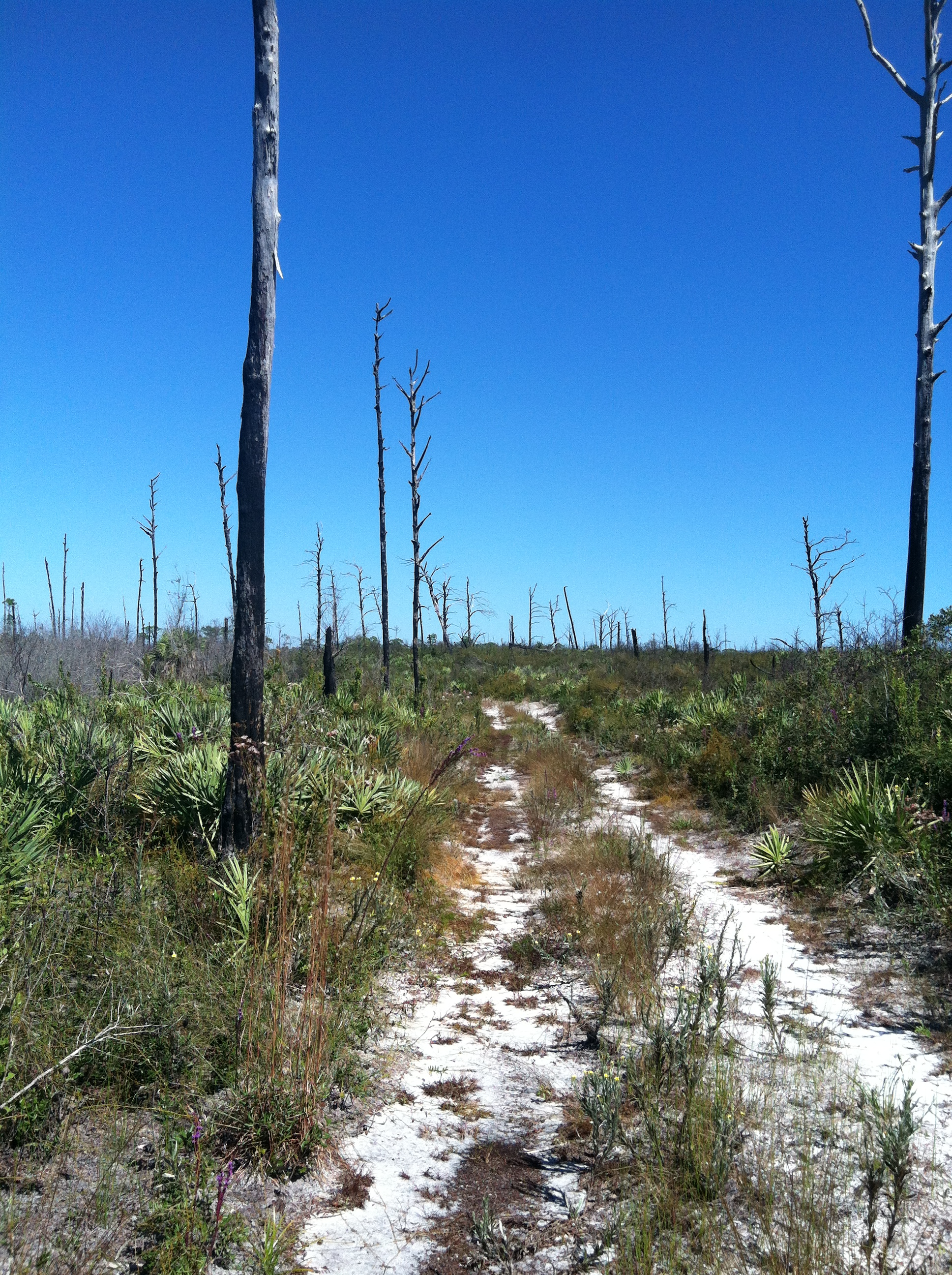
Aftermath of wildfire

== See also ==
- Hobe Mountain

== References and external links ==
- Jonathan Dickinson State Park at Florida State Parks
- Jonathan Dickinson State Park at State Parks of the United States
- Jonathan Dickinson State Park at Absolutely Florida

Specific
