= Camp Murphy (Florida) =

Former army camp in Florida

- Martin County, Florida; Near Hobe Sound, Florida in United States

Site information
- Type: Training
- Owner: United States Army
- Controlled by: United States Army Signal Corps

Location
- Coordinates: 27°0′17″N 80°07′45″W
- Area: 7,996 acres (3,236 ha)

Site history
- Built: 4 February 1942-4 June 1942
- In use: 6 June 1942-November 1944
- Fate: Demolished; transferred to the State of Florida
- Events: World War II

Garrison information
- Past commanders: Colonel Hugh Mitchell
- Garrison: 801st Signal Training Regiment
- Occupants: Southern Signal Corps School

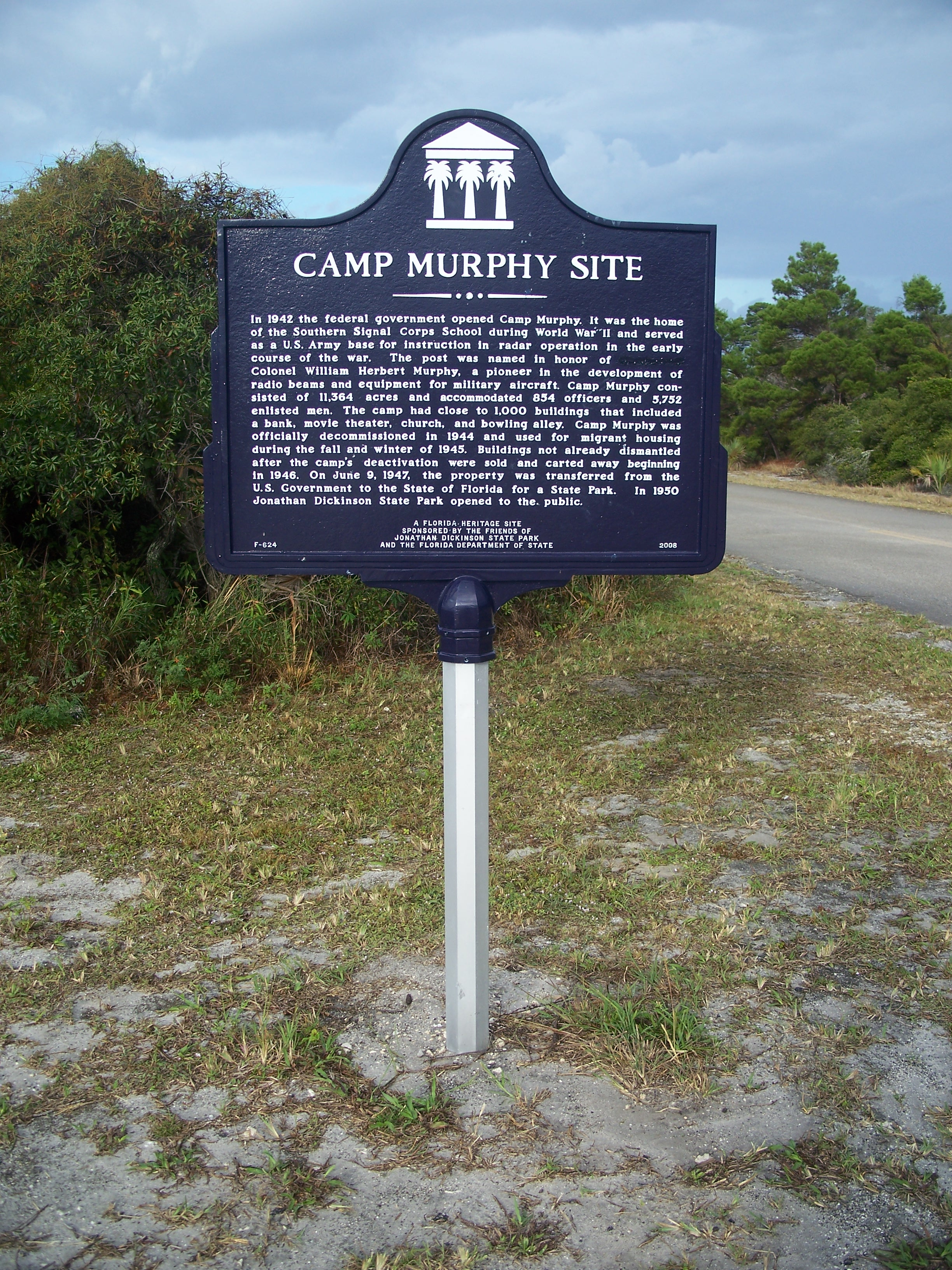
Camp Murphy historical marker

The United States Army Signal Corps established Camp Murphy, a top-secret radar training school in 1942. Camp Murphy was located between Stuart and Jupiter in what is now Jonathan Dickinson State Park in Martin County in southeastern Florida.

== History ==
In 1942 the federal government opened Camp Murphy. It was the home of the Southern Signal Corps School during World War II and served as a US Army base for instruction in radar operation in the early course of the war. The post was named in honor of Col. William Herbert Murphy, a pioneer in the development of radio beams and equipment for military aircraft. Camp Murphy consisted of 11,364 acres (45.99 km^{2}) and accommodated 854 officers and 5,752 enlisted men. The camp had close to 1,000 buildings that included a bank, movie theater, church and bowling alley. Camp Murphy was officially decommissioned in 1944 and used for migrant housing during the fall and winter of 1945. Buildings not already dismantled after the camp's deactivation were sold and carted away beginning in 1948. On 9 June 1947, the property was transferred from the US Govt. to the State of Florida for a State Park. In 1950 Jonathan Dickinson State Park opened to the public.

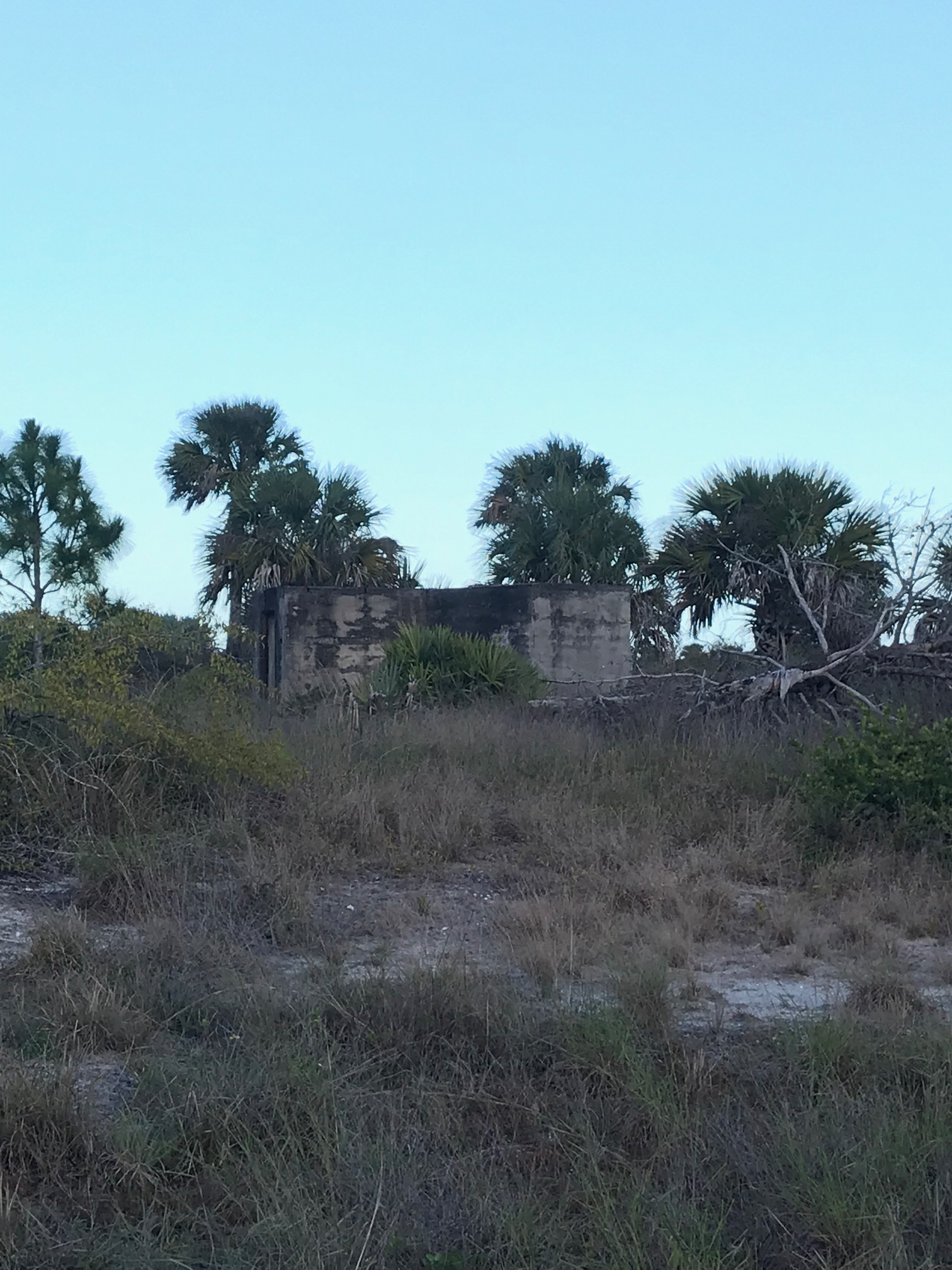
Remains of bank vault along Green Trail at Jonathan Dickinson State Park

The camp included over 1,000 buildings and housed more than 6,000 officers and soldiers. The camp was deactivated in 1944 after less than two years of operation. All but three of the camp buildings have been torn down or removed but some of the building foundations remain. One foundation structure still to be seen is the vault to the Atlantic National Bank that was in the Provost building. This is an intact two-room walk-in vault although the vault doors have been removed. One of the vault doors apparently had to be forced open from inside—there is a man-sized hole in the roof immediately above the doorway with the concrete rebar bent inward.

In addition, on the western side of the railroad tracks, the remains of the water treatment facility are still visible, although very run down. Throughout the Treasure Coast and Palm Beach, there are still former Camp Murphy buildings in use which were obtained as surplus shortly after the war. Also, the former USO club buildings are still standing in nearby communities of Hobe Sound and Stuart. Currently, one of the few buildings still in use is now the "Road to Victory Military Museum", located next to Memorial Park / tennis courts in Stuart. One of the Jonathan Dickinson camping areas is located in the area that was the Camp Hospital.

Local legend Vince "Trapper" Nelson was assigned to the base as a member of the military police. American humorist and writer Jean Shepherd also served in the signal corps there in 1943.

There are several remaining sites that may be observed. The former ammunition dump is just to the east of the train tracks, it has been sealed shut but you can see the top of the structure. The building across from Hobe Hill is a former barracks. The park office, located just west of the camp area, was a secret bomb shelter for government persons during the Kennedy administration. Walking south along the tracks, the former gun range still has a wall standing; walking along the hills you can find bullets. In the back of the park's riding trail you can see a steam engine that was used in the 1800s to cut cypress logs for the F.E.C.railway. Also the small home near the maintenance shed was the former camp commander's quarters. The ammo dump was used as a fallout shelter for years by park employees; it had 2 rooms and a second level accessed with a stairwell.

== The state park ==
The property was transferred to the State of Florida in 1947 and opened as the Jonathan Dickinson State Park in 1950.

== The trails ==
Presently, much of the former Camp Murphy site is occupied by volunteer built and maintained mountain bike trails. There are about 9 miles in a stacked loop system with multiple bail-outs. Difficulty is easy/intermediate with some optional advanced sections. Additional features at the trailhead include a pump track, skills course, and a children's trail.

== See also ==
- Signal Corps (United States Army)
