= Trapper Nelson =

American trapper, hunter, and zoo founder

- Born: November 5, 1908; Trenton, New Jersey, U.S.
- Died: 1968 (aged 59–60); Hobe Sound, Florida, U.S.
- Cause of death: Self-inflicted gunshot wound
- Body discovered: July 30, 1968
- Other names: Vincent Natulkiewicz; Vince "Trapper" Nelson
- Height: 6 ft 3 in (1.91 m)
- Relatives: Philip Celmer II (nephew, executor, deceased, 1994) Cynthia Celmer Tomassetti (grand-niece), Philip Celmer III (grand-nephew), Richard Celmer (grand-nephew)

Vince "Trapper" Nelson (born Vincent Nostokovich or Natulkiewicz; 1909–1968) was an American trapper, hunter and zoo founder. Though he was born in New Jersey, and lived in Mexico and Texas, Nelson is best known for establishing a homestead-turned-zoo on the shore of Florida's Loxahatchee River. Filled with exotic and wild animals, his zoo was a popular tourist spot in the 1940s and 1950s, visited by local and national celebrities. Because of this, he became known locally as "Tarzan of the Loxahatchee".

The zoo was eventually shut down by state health inspectors in 1960. After his zoo was closed, Nelson became a hermit and suffered from undiagnosed health problems. In 1968, he was found dead from a gunshot wound in his cabin by a friend. His death was ruled a suicide. Nelson's campsite is now known as the Trapper Nelson Zoo Historic District in Jonathan Dickinson State Park, Hobe Sound, Florida.

== Early life ==
The Historical Society of Palm Beach County, in the article "Vincent "Trapper Nelson" Natulkiewicz", claims "Vincent Natulkiewicz was born in Trenton, New Jersey about 1908". Vincent Natulkiewicz was born to Casimer and Christine Natulkiewicz, in Trenton New Jersey in 1908, per grand-niece, Cynthia Celmer Tomassetti. As a child, to earn money, he began trapping animals such as muskrats in the marshes of New Jersey. His parents did not speak English, so Nelson would often assist them in translating to make sure they were not taken advantage of. However, when his mother died and his father remarried, Nelson ran away from home, heading west.

Hopping freight trains, Nelson first ended up in Colorado, then eventually in Mexico. While there, he was arrested by the Federales under suspicion of gunrunning. He spent time in a Mexican jail and was later released. Nelson later claimed his release was because he "wrecked their food budget".

After his release Nelson headed back east with 10 cents to his name. He made money for food by gambling with other road bums until he made it to South Florida, where he, his step brother Charles Nelson and friend John Dykas set up camp.

== Settlement on the Loxahatchee ==
Nelson and his partners settled on the beach by the Jupiter Inlet in Palm Beach County, Florida, in the late 1920s. Bessie DuBois, wife of John DuBois, recalled seeing him for the first time in 1927 or 1928. The DuBoises owned a restaurant that Nelson would frequent, and Bessie made note of his eccentric eating habits: "He would order a pie—not a piece of pie, mind you, but a pie—and he'd eat the whole thing right in front of me". He ate ice cream by the half-gallon, and there were stories that he once ate 18 eggs for breakfast.

Things did not stay peaceful for long. On December 17, 1931, Charles Nelson shot partner John Dykas in the back, killing him. Trapper Nelson, angered by his step-brother's actions, testified against him at the trial for Dykas' murder. Charles was given a 20-year sentence at Raiford Prison. Disillusioned with civilization, Nelson withdrew from the beach, settling deep in the woods on the Loxahatchee River that same December. Using what little money he had and money borrowed from his sister, he bought 800 acres.

Physically imposing at 6'4" and 240 pounds, he lived by trapping, hunting, and fishing in what was then wild country. He made money by selling the furs of the animals he trapped, and ate the meat, starting rumors that he ate everything from opossums to stray house cats. He acquired extensive land holdings, bidding on tax auctions during the Great Depression. He would on occasion bid against Judge C. E. Chillingworth, the judge who had handed down his step-brother's sentence, and the two eventually became friends. When Chillingworth was murdered in the 1950s, Charles Nelson was briefly considered a suspect.

Trapping could only bring Nelson income seasonally, and as south Florida became a popular tourist destination, he came up with a new way to earn money. He eventually developed a zoo on his property in the 1930s, calling it "Trapper Nelson's Zoo and Jungle Gardens". His camp and zoo became popular tourist attractions. Tours along the river from West Palm Beach would stop there for lunch and stretch breaks, and Nelson shared the profits with the boat captains. Locally prominent people and celebrities alike visited, including boxing champion Gene Tunney and actor Gary Cooper, to see his animals, watch Nelson wrestle alligators, and buy souvenirs.

With his new fame came notoriety. He was known locally as the "Tarzan of the Loxahatchee", and cared for the locals' exotic pets. He would trap troublesome wild animals, and provided others for parties and events. Rumors were started about his handsomeness, his eating habits (Bessie DuBois denied he ate raw possum), and his romantic exploits. It was told that he courted heiresses and countesses from wealthy Palm Beach, and that one conquest was a direct descendant of President James Monroe.

Nelson married in 1940 in an attempt to avoid the draft for World War II. His plan failed and he was drafted anyway. He joined the Military Police in Texas, but while training, he tore a muscle in his leg and was transferred to Camp Murphy, which was very close to his land.

== Decline ==
Upon his return to the Loxahatchee, Nelson discovered that his wife had a new lover. He divorced his wife, and after that Nelson bought cars for the women he wooed, paying for them in installments to ensure they would stay for at least a while.

Focusing again on his zoo, he found that property values were skyrocketing. Nelson got a subscription to the Wall Street Journal and added more and more land to his sprawling camp. Shortly after he began his forays into real estate, a health inspector declared his zoo unhygienic and demanded he install lavatories. Nelson did, but the Health Department found them "unsatisfactory", and in 1960 he was forced to close his zoo. With no income, the taxes on the land became too much for him, and he ended up borrowing $100,000 ($1,090,000 in today's dollars) to pay them.

Nelson already had a deep-seated mistrust of the government, and the closing of his zoo was, to him, enough to confirm his paranoia. He became more and more closed off. He began to dam the river leading to his camp to keep boats away, and installed fences and padlocks to discourage land travelers. He put up signs around his land reading "Danger: Land Mines". As added discouragement, he kept a 12-gauge shotgun with him at all times.

Nelson began to develop severe stomach pains, but refused to see a doctor. He distrusted them because his brother-in-law, Philp Celmer I had died during pacemaker surgery. It was speculated among friends that the pains were from cancer, but they could have been an acid condition. Nelson was ill, and had to urinate using a catheter. His grand niece, Cynthia Celmer Tomassetti, who saw him weeks before his death, remembers him in poor health; says Celmer Tomassetti, "He told me he had let all of the zoo animals go because was afraid he would become too ill to care for them, and they might starve to death".

By the 1960s Nelson had become so reclusive that he would not let even trusted friends visit him without first sending a postcard to ask his permission. He ventured into town once a week to check his mail at the post office, and would sometimes buy steaks, but for the most part he remained holed up in his cabin. Years later, his nephew recalled his uncle's change in personality: "During the last 10 years, his eyes seemed to lose their sparkle. He became a lonely man, and a rather sick one".

== Death ==
In July 1968, Nelson failed to appear for a planned meeting with an old friend. John DuBois, at whose house the meeting was supposed to take place, became worried and drove to Nelson's camp. When he surveyed the campsite, everything appeared to be in order, until he got to Nelson's chickee.

Nelson was found dead in his cabin from a shotgun blast to his stomach on July 30, 1968. The Coroner's Office ruled it a suicide, and the Martin County Sheriff's Office deemed it a "pretty clear-cut case". However, many Florida locals had their doubts. "If it were [sic] a suicide, why did[n't] he do a head shot instead of a chest shot?" asked Bessie DuBois. The theory was that he stuck the shotgun in the ground, leaned over and pulled the trigger, even though it would have taken considerable effort and flexibility on Nelson's part.

It was undeniable that Nelson had enemies. Floridian trappers envied his skill and viewed him as an outsider because he was from New Jersey. The State wanted to develop his land into condominiums and golf courses. Shortly before his death, a man who repaired one of Nelson's jeeps found out he was sick and had not seen a doctor in six months. The man took him to a doctor who prescribed him painkillers. A neighbor, and the last man to see Nelson alive, speculated: "I guess it would be possible for someone to sneak up on him. Ordinarily it would be impossible... but if he were doped up, well that would be different".

Some friends considered suicide a possibility, however. His stomach pains may have taken a substantial part in a decision to end his life. An executor of Nelson's will said he had told his sister that he would "rather die than be an invalid". Nelson's family never considered foul play, said grand-niece, Cynthia Celmer Tomassetti, "Vince had discussed his failing health with my father, brother and mother. He was adamant that he would not live in that manner. It was my father's opinion that he avoided aiming as his head to spare his considerably handsome face".

== Legacy ==
A few months after Nelson's death, the state traded land for Nelson's estate, which became part of Jonathan Dickinson State Park. The site is now known as the Trapper Nelson Zoo Historic District. After the land was converted to a park, but still unopen to the public, the camp was often vandalized. One of Nelson's tool sheds was burned down; the arsonist attempted to burn other buildings but was unsuccessful.

In April 1984, park rangers discovered Nelson's "treasure": a hiding place in his chimney held 5,005 coins, totaling $1,829.46. The coins ranged in date from the 1890s to the 1960s. A thorough search of the camp was conducted before revealing the find to the public, but nothing more was found.

The camp still stands today, with his cabin, a guest cabin, a chickee shelter, docks, a boathouse, and assorted cages from his zoo. There are also fruit trees that he planted, including surinam cherry, Java plum and wild almond.
