= Wild almond =

Wild almond is a common name for several plants and may refer to:

- Wild growing forms of the almond, Prunus amygdalus, native to the Middle East and South Asia
- Brabejum stellatifolium, native to South Africa
- Irvingia malayana, native to southeast Asia
- Prunus fasciculata, native to the southwestern United States
- Prunus turneriana, native to Papua New Guinea and Australia
- Sterculia foetida, native to the Old World tropics
