= Seminole Inn =

- U.S. National Register of Historic Places
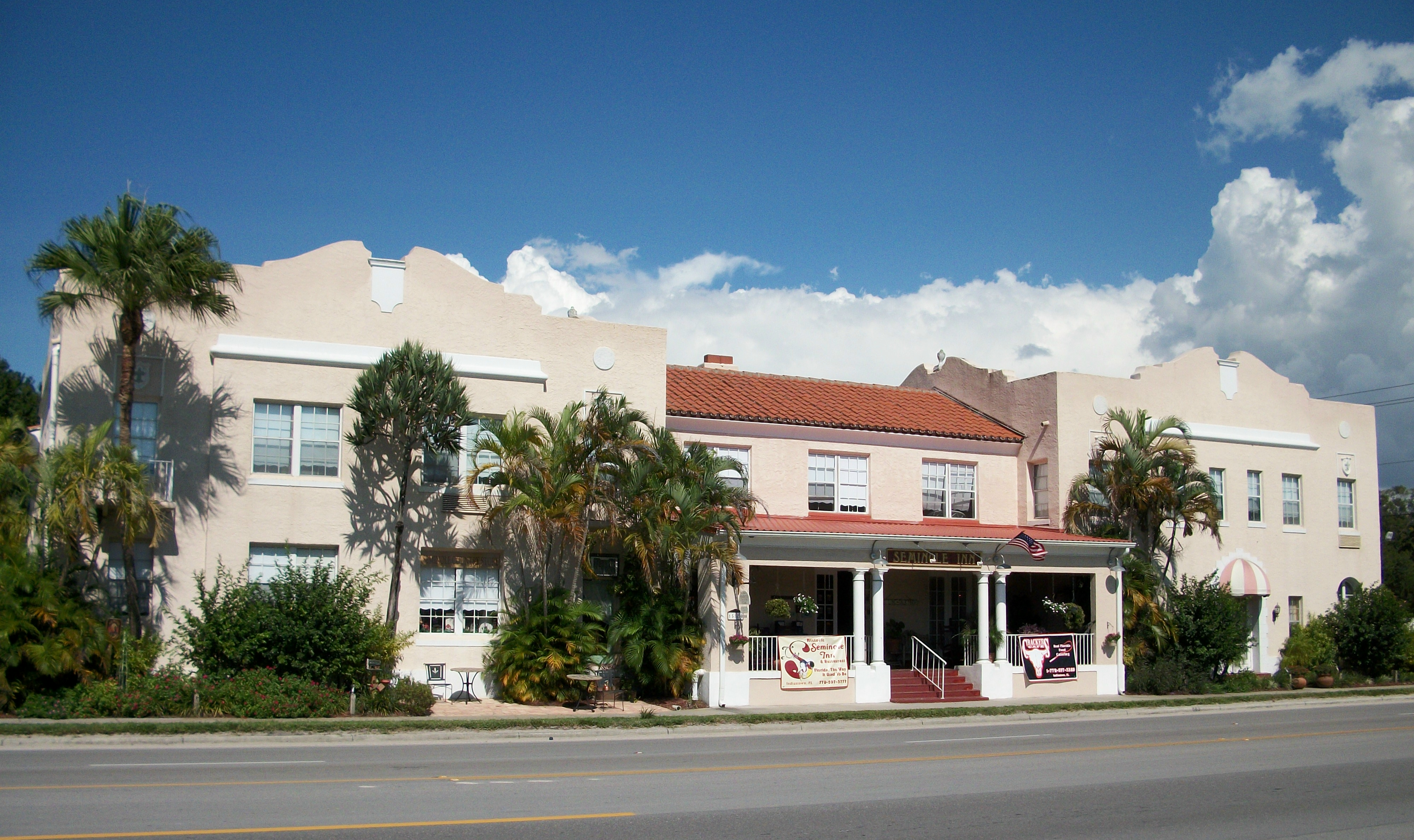

- Location within Florida Location within the United States
- Location: Indiantown, Florida
- Coordinates: 27°1′22″N 80°28′13″W
- Built: 1926
- Architect: Harvey, Henry Stephen
- Architectural style: Mission Revival-Spanish Colonial Revival
- NRHP reference No.: 06000442
- Added to NRHP: May 31, 2006

The Seminole Inn, also known as the Seminole Country Inn, is a Mission Revival style historic hotel located at 15885 Southeast Warfield Boulevard in Indiantown, Florida. It was built in 1926 by S. Davies Warfield, who was president of the Seaboard Air Line Railroad, which developed Indiantown, while Henry Stephen Harvey of the West Palm Beach architectural firm Harvey and Clarke designed the building.

Burt Reynolds, Warfield's niece Wallis Warfield Simpson, later the Duchess of Windsor, and Ted Williams remain the hotel's famous guests. Reynolds filmed parts of two movies, Smokey and the Bandit and The Man from Left Field at the inn. On May 31, 2006, the Seminole Inn was added to the National Register of Historic Places.

== History and description ==
S. Davies Warfield, who was president of the Seaboard Air Line Railroad, extended the Seaboard Air Line Railroad in Florida in 1924, stretching from Coleman to West Palm Beach, which included a stop in Indiantown. By the following year, Warfield began building the Seminole Inn, which cost approximately $66,000 to erect. Henry Stephen Harvey of the Harvey and Clarke architectural firm of West Palm Beach designed the inn. Located at 15885 S.W. Warfield Boulevard, the hotel, also sometimes referred to as the Seminole Country Inn, opened in 1926. During this time, Warfield Boulevard, officially known as Florida State Road 710, was a very important highway across the state.

The Seminole Inn is a two-story Mediterranean Revival-style building that also has Spanish Renaissance and Mission-style elements. Upon opening in 1926, the hotel contained 36 guest rooms but only 6 bathrooms. One year later, Warfield passed away. His family expressed a lack of desire and ability to operate the hotel, but continued to own it, nonetheless. By 1937, The Indiantown Development Company had purchased all Warfield holdings. When the Indiantown Company bought the hotel in 1953, one of their subsidiaries, the Indiantown Telephone Company, operated in there until 1961.

By the mid-1960s, the inn was abandoned and would remain so until being purchased by the Wall family for the first time in 1975. Burt Reynolds used the hotel for filming parts of Smokey and the Bandit in the 1970s and The Man from Left Field in 1993. On May 31, 2006, the Seminole Inn was added to the National Register of Historic Places. Currently, the hotel has a cafe, a conservatory, a dining room, a gift shop, 23 guest rooms, a lobby, and offices. Warfield's niece, Wallis Warfield Simpson, later the Duchess of Windsor, Reynolds, and Ted Williams are its most famous guests.

== See also ==
- National Register of Historic Places listings in Martin County, Florida
