= Indiantown, Florida =

- Village
- Village of Indiantown
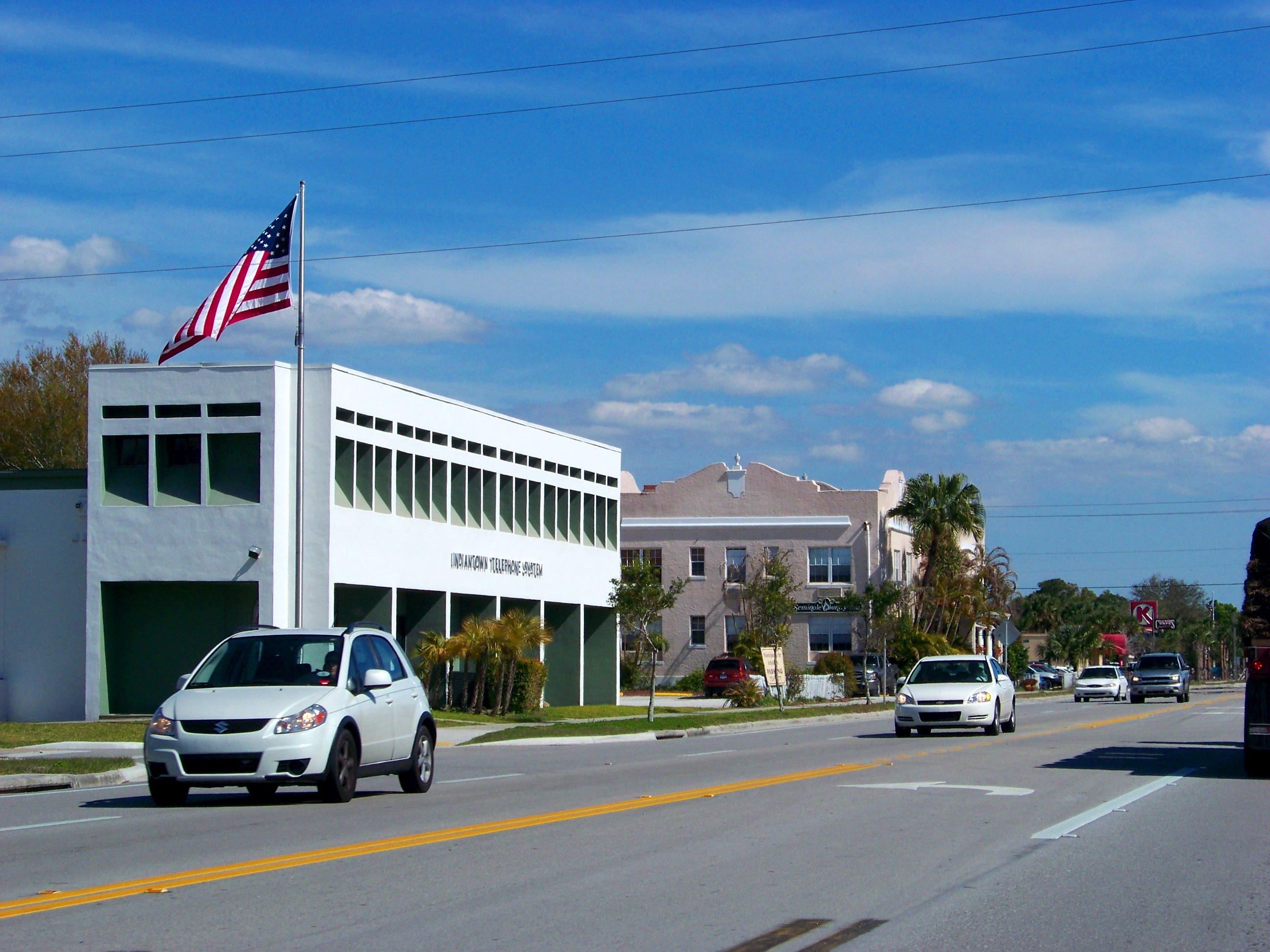
- SW Warfield Blvd.

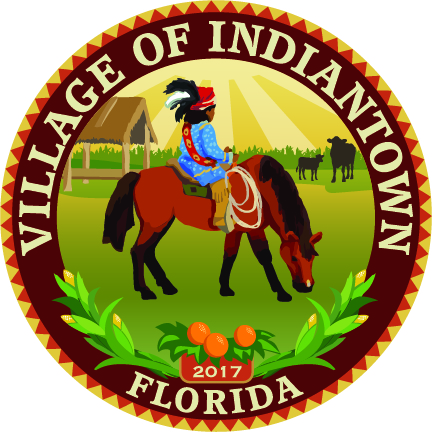
- Seal
- Motto: Where Great Things Grow
- Location in Martin County and the state of Florida
- Coordinates: 27°02′45″N 80°30′41″W
- Country: United States
- State: Florida
- County: Martin
- Settled: Circa 1890s
- Incorporated: December 31, 2017

Government
  - Type: Mayor-Council

Area
  - Total: 14.44 sq mi (37.40 km^{2})
  - Land: 14.18 sq mi (36.73 km^{2})
  - Water: 0.26 sq mi (0.67 km^{2})
- Elevation: 36 ft (11 m)

Population (2020)
  - Total: 6,560
  - Density: 462.6/sq mi (178.62/km^{2})
- Time zone: UTC-5 (Eastern (EST))
  - Summer (DST): UTC-4 (EDT)
- ZIP code: 34956
- Area code: 772
- FIPS code: 12-33700
- GNIS feature ID: 2791523
- Website: www.indiantownfl.gov

Indiantown is a village in Martin County, Florida, United States. The population was 6,560 at the 2020 census. It is a rural community in the interior of Florida's Treasure Coast region, first established in the early 1900s, then incorporated on December 31, 2017. The village is governed by a mayor and council elected at-large, while day-to-day operations are directed by the village manager.

Indiantown has been noted as hosting a large population of Maya Guatemalans, who began to move to the city in the 1980s in order to flee the Guatemalan Civil War.

== History ==
The Indiantown Seaboard Air Line Railroad depot, now demolished

Indiantown was originally established by the Seminole people as a trading post. Tribes fleeing southwards from the U.S. Army after the First Seminole War found the area an attractive place to settle due to a relatively higher elevation and ample hunting and fishing spots. White American colonists then gained control of the area in the 1890s.

In 1924, Indiantown was transformed when S. Davies Warfield built an extension of the Seaboard Air Line Railroad from Coleman, Florida, to West Palm Beach, passing directly through—and stopping in—Indiantown. Warfield's contributions to Indiantown are memorialized in, among others, Warfield Boulevard (the main route through Indiantown) and Warfield Elementary School.

Warfield planned to make Indiantown the southern hub of the Seaboard rail line. Toward that end, he planned a model city, laying out streets and building a school, housing, and a railroad station. Warfield also built the Seminole Inn, which is now on the National Register of Historic Places.

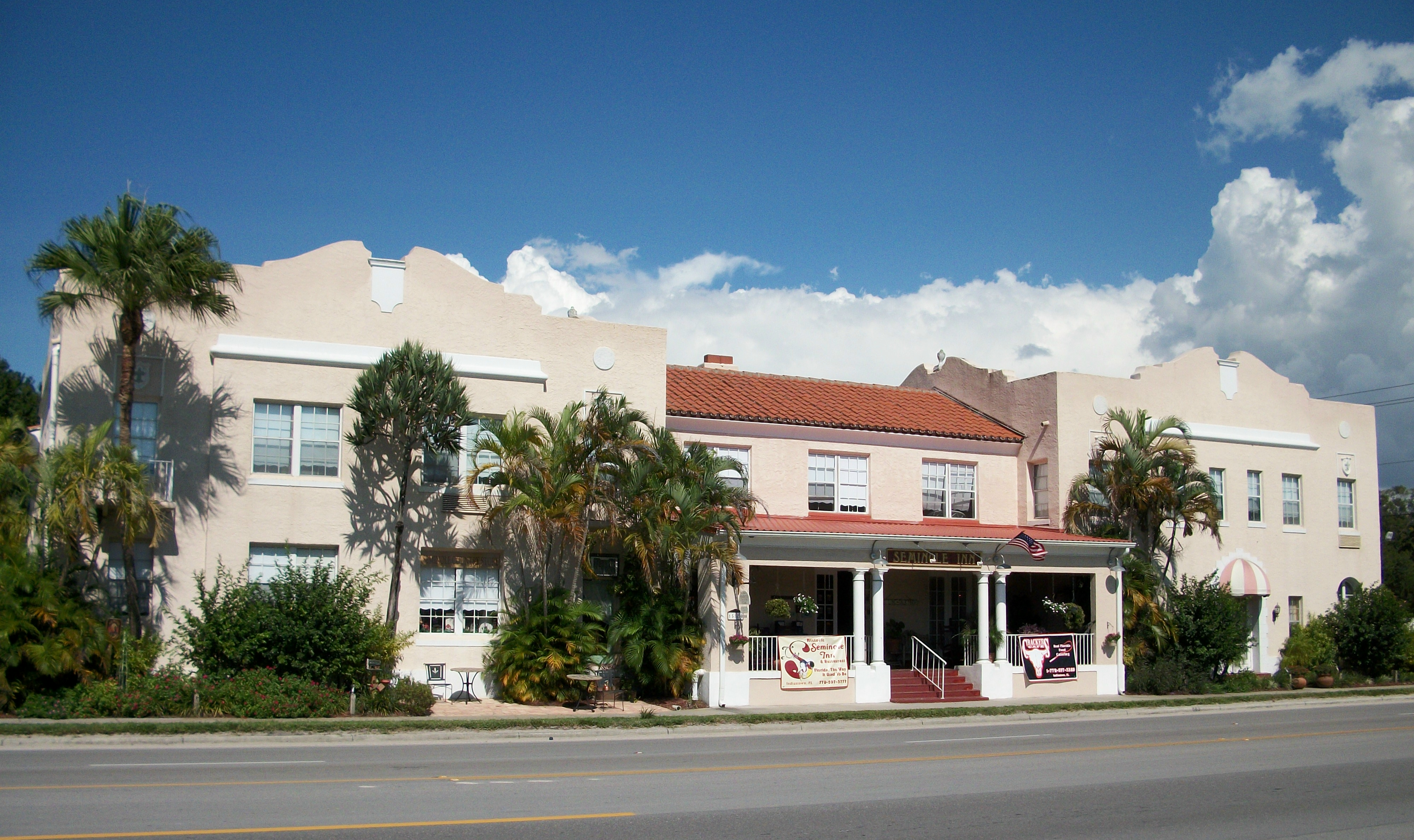
The Seminole Inn

The Florida land boom of the 1920s fizzled out after 1926. Warfield died a year later, putting an end to plans to make Indiantown the Seaboard's southern headquarters. The 1928 Okeechobee hurricane wreaked significant destruction and halted further development.

A serious effort to revitalize the local economy began in 1952 when the Indiantown Development Corporation was sold and restructured as the Indiantown Company. The company was involved in the construction of new water and sewage systems, housing developments, docks making use of the St. Lucie River, and a 6,000-foot (1,830 m) airstrip for bringing in small cargo and civilian air traffic.

In the 1950s and 1960s, Indiantown was home to the Circle T Ranch and its Circle T Rodeo Bowl. The 1963 rodeo event drew approximately 15,000 visitors, making it the largest tourist attraction in Florida at the time. The ranch was later bought out and turned into a filming studio.

Seaboard trains continued to stop at the Indiantown depot through the 1960s, but passenger service to the station was eliminated when Amtrak took over in 1971. The depot was demolished several years later. The Seminole Inn is virtually all that remains of the 1920s boom.

=== Immigration by Maya Guatemalans ===
During the Guatemalan Civil War, Indiantown and its surrounding area became a destination for Indigenous Maya from Guatemala who were seeking refuge amid the Guatemalan genocide. Maya refugees began settling in Indiantown in the 1980s, and grew to a population in the thousands by the 2000s.

The Washington Post reported that many individual seeking refuge spoke a Mayan language as a first language. By one estimate in 2010, there were four to five thousand Maya in Indiantown. Guillermo Carrasco, the chair of the board for the Guatemalan Maya Center in Lake Worth Beach, Florida, stated that the town's name, "Indiantown", appealed to indigenous Guatemalan migrants.

Currently, the economy of Indiantown relies heavily on seasonal agriculture. The town also continues to make use of its position near the intersections of many major roads to act as a transportation and infrastructure hub. There are also attempts to take advantage of nearby natural wetlands and to revitalize the rodeo in order to draw in tourists.

During the COVID-19 pandemic, Indiantown was particularly affected by the virus, with 10% of the city testing positive for the virus as of July 2020, among the highest in the state at the time.

== Geography ==
Indiantown is located in western Martin County 12 miles (19 km) east of Port Mayaca on Lake Okeechobee, 22 miles (35 km) southwest of Stuart, the Martin county seat, and 36 miles (58 km) northwest of West Palm Beach.

According to the United States Census Bureau, Indiantown has a total area of 14.4 square miles (37 km^{2}), of which 0.3 square miles (0.8 km^{2}), or 1.80%, are water. The town's southern border is the St. Lucie Canal, connecting Lake Okeechobee with the St. Lucie River near Stuart.

== Demographics ==
Historical population
Census	Pop.	Note	%±
2000	5,588		—
2010	6,083		8.9%
2020	6,560		7.8%
U.S. Decennial Census

=== Racial and ethnic composition ===
Indiantown racial composition (Hispanics excluded from racial categories) (NH = Non-Hispanic)
Race	Pop 2010	Pop 2020	% 2010	% 2020
White (NH)	1,254	1,089	20.61%	16.60%
Black or African American (NH)	847	805	13.92%	12.27%
Native American or Alaska Native (NH)	12	6	0.20%	0.09%
Asian (NH)	12	14	0.20%	0.21%
Pacific Islander or Native Hawaiian (NH)	1	3	0.02%	0.05%
Some other race (NH)	2	17	0.03%	0.26%
Two or more races/Multiracial (NH)	23	63	0.38%	0.96%
Hispanic or Latino (any race)	3,932	4,563	64.64%	69.56%
Total	6,083	6,560	100.00%	100.00%

=== 2020 census ===
As of the 2020 census, Indiantown had a population of 6,560. The median age was 30.0 years. 32.0% of residents were under the age of 18 and 14.7% of residents were 65 years of age or older. For every 100 females there were 101.4 males, and for every 100 females age 18 and over there were 104.0 males age 18 and over.

83.8% of residents lived in urban areas, while 16.2% lived in rural areas.

There were 1,777 households in Indiantown, of which 46.1% had children under the age of 18 living in them. Of all households, 46.0% were married-couple households, 16.9% were households with a male householder and no spouse or partner present, and 30.5% were households with a female householder and no spouse or partner present. About 19.1% of all households were made up of individuals and 12.6% had someone living alone who was 65 years of age or older.

There were 1,965 housing units, of which 9.6% were vacant. The homeowner vacancy rate was 0.6% and the rental vacancy rate was 4.9%. According to the 2020 ACS 5-year estimates, there were 1,357 families residing in the village.

=== 2010 census ===
As of the 2010 United States census, there were 6,083 people, 1,383 households, and 1,029 families residing in the village.

=== 2000 census ===
As of the census of 2000, there were 5,588 people, 1,648 households, and 1,264 families residing in the village. The population density was 936.2 inhabitants per square mile (361.5/km^{2}). There were 1,807 housing units at an average density of 302.7 per square mile (116.9/km^{2}). The racial makeup of the Village was 45.92% White, 20.99% African American, 2.29% Native American, 0.20% Asian, 0.97% Pacific Islander, 26.54% from other races, and 3.10% from two or more races. Hispanic or Latino of any race were 48.93% of the population.

In 2000, there were 1,648 households, out of which 33.7% had children under the age of 18 living with them, 54.9% were married couples living together, 13.7% had a female householder with no husband present, and 23.3% were non-families. 17.2% of all households were made up of individuals, and 9.9% had someone living alone who was 65 years of age or older. The average household size was 3.39 and the average family size was 3.59.

In 2000, in the village, the population was spread out, with 31.2% under the age of 18, 11.4% from 18 to 24, 25.6% from 25 to 44, 15.7% from 45 to 64, and 16.2% who were 65 years of age or older. The median age was 30 years. For every 100 females, there were 123.0 males. For every 100 females age 18 and over, there were 123.2 males.

In 2000, the median income for a household in the village was $28,977, and the median income for a family was $30,675. Males had a median income of $17,810 versus $19,063 for females. The per capita income for the village was $11,085. About 18.8% of families and 23.8% of the population were below the poverty line, including 31.3% of those under age 18 and 7.0% of those age 65 or over.

== Government ==
The Village of Indiantown was incorporated on December 31, 2017 by special state legislation, subject to approval by residents in a referendum. Indiantown is a Village located in Martin County, governed by a village council of five. The Village of Indiantown has a council-manager form of government. The Village of Indiantown selected their first permanent village manager on December 17, 2018.

== Public transportation ==
Martin County Public Transit (MARTY) provides fixed-route bus service through Indiantown.

== Parks and recreation ==
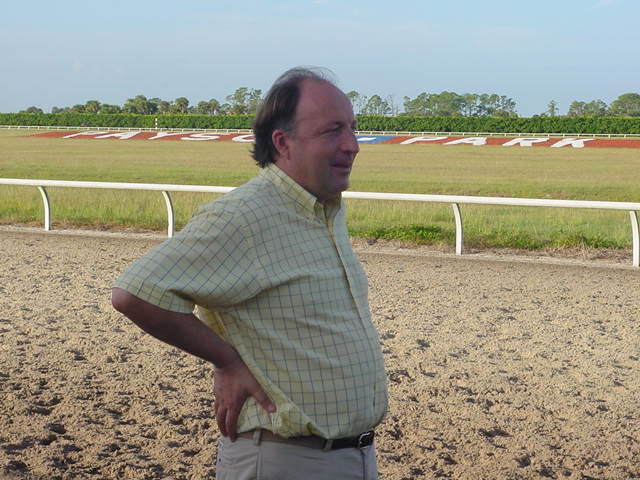
Christophe Clement at Payson Park for a training session

Indiantown is the home of Payson Park, one of the top thoroughbred horse racing facilities in the United States. Among the trainers with their champion horses who have participated in this event are William Mott, Christophe Clement, Roger Attfield, Shug McGaughey, John C. Kimmel, and Tom Albertrani. The Monkees frontman, Davy Jones, also kept a stable of thoroughbred horses in Indiantown, and it was here that he died in 2012 on Leap Year Day.

Other parks located within the village are Big Mound Park, Booker Park, Post Family Park, and Timer Powers Park.

== Notable people ==
- Charles Emanuel, professional NFL Football player
- Cleveland Gary, professional NFL football player
- Davy Jones, musician and actor from The Monkees
- Corey McIntyre, professional NFL football player
- Patrick Sheltra, 2010 ARCA Racing Series racing champion
