= Baltimore Steam Packet Company =

Steamship company

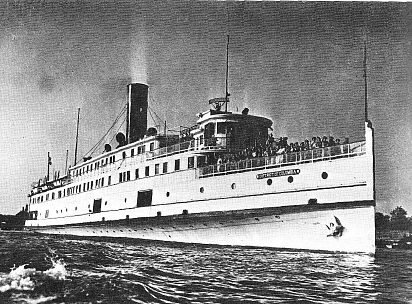
The Old Bay Line's District of Columbia in 1949

The Baltimore Steam Packet Company, nicknamed the Old Bay Line, was an American steamship line from 1840 to 1962 that provided overnight steamboat service on Chesapeake Bay, primarily between Baltimore, Maryland, and Norfolk, Virginia. Called a "packet" for the mail packets carried on government mail contracts, the term in the 19th century came to mean a steamer line operating on a regular, fixed daily schedule between two or more cities. When it closed in 1962 after 122 years of existence, it was the last surviving overnight steamship passenger service in the United States.

In addition to regularly calling on Baltimore and Norfolk, the Baltimore Steam Packet Company at various times provided freight, passenger and vehicle transport to Washington, D.C., Old Point Comfort, and Richmond, Virginia. The Old Bay Line, as it came to be known by the 1860s, was acclaimed for its genteel service and fine dining, serving Chesapeake Bay specialties. Walter Lord, famed author of A Night to Remember (and whose grandfather had been the packet line's president from 1893 to 1899), mused that its reputation for excellent service was attributable to "some magical blending of the best in the North and the South, made possible by the Company's unique role in 'bridging' the two sections...the North contributed its tradition of mechanical proficiency, making the ships so reliable; while the South contributed its gracious ease".

In 1947 a former Old Bay Line steamship, President Warfield, became Exodus, carrying Jewish refugees from Europe in an unsuccessful attempt to emigrate to Mandatory Palestine. The voyage was commemorated in a book in 1958 and movie in 1960.

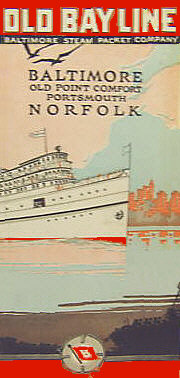
Old Bay Line 1950s timetable

== History ==
Just seven years after Robert Fulton proved the commercial viability of steam-powered ships with his North River Steamboat (more commonly known today as Clermont) in 1807, small wood-burning steamers began to ply the Chesapeake Bay. Before the arrival of railroads and river steamboats in the early 19th century, overland travel was exceedingly slow and tedious. Rivers were the main means of transportation and most cities were founded on them. This was especially so in North America, where journeys over vast distances of hundreds or even thousands of miles required months of hazardous, uncomfortable travel by stagecoach or wagon on rutted, unpaved trails. In the 1830s, railroads were being built, but the technology was crude and average passenger train speed was only 12 miles per hour (19 km/h). Perhaps more importantly, most early railroads did not connect. It would be many years before the various lines were knitted together to make intercity rail travel in the U.S. a reality. Not until 1863, for example, was it possible to travel between New York City and Washington, D.C., without changing trains en route.

In this period, steamships on rivers such as the Ohio and Mississippi or large inland bodies of water such as the Great Lakes and the Chesapeake Bay offered a comfortable and relatively fast mode of transportation. The first steamboat to serve Baltimore was the locally built Chesapeake, constructed in 1813 to link Baltimore with Philadelphia, Pennsylvania. Operated by the Union Line, the boat connected with a stagecoach for the overland portion of the journey. Two years later, the Briscoe-Partridge Line's Eagle was the first steamboat to sail the length of Chesapeake Bay.

The direct ancestor of the Baltimore Steam Packet Company was the Maryland & Virginia Steam Boat Company formed in 1828 to link Baltimore, Richmond, and Norfolk, traversing the Chesapeake Bay and the James River. By 1839, the Maryland & Virginia was heavily in debt from the purchase of two new, large ships the year before: the 210-foot (64 m) long Alabama and the 173-foot (53 m) Jewess. Alabama was costly to operate and proved impractical for Chesapeake Bay operations, causing the bankruptcy of the Maryland & Virginia later that year.

=== 1840s–1850s ===
House flag used by Baltimore Steam Packet Company

When the Maryland & Virginia collapsed in late 1839, the Maryland legislature convened to grant a charter to the Baltimore Steam Packet Company, organized in Baltimore to provide overnight steamship service on the Chesapeake Bay. The company's incorporators were Benjamin Bush, Andrew F. Henderson (who became the line's first president), John B. Howell, Thomas Kelso (who would become a director of the line), John S. McKim, Samuel McDonald, Gen. William McDonald, Robert A. Taylor, and Joel Vickers, all of Baltimore.

The company was granted a 20-year charter on March 18, 1840, by the Maryland legislature and then acquired three of the former Maryland & Virginia's steamboats: Pocahontas, Georgia, and Jewess. (Note: The original Baltimore Steam Packet Company charter granted by the state of Maryland for twenty years in 1840 was successively extended by the legislature and finally made perpetual by an act passed in 1922, which conferred upon the steamship line the customary rights of the general corporation laws of Maryland.) The company began overnight paddlewheel steamship passenger and freight service daily except Sundays between Baltimore and Norfolk. By 1848, the company's steamship Herald was making the trip in less than 12 hours, a time which the line would maintain until the end in 1962. An affiliate, the Powhatan Line, started service between Norfolk and Richmond in 1845, interchanging freight and passengers with the Old Bay Line.

By the 1850s, competition was keen as steamships grew in size and efficiency to serve the fast-growing nation. The Old Bay Line, in particular, served as a link between the antebellum South and northern markets, hauling large quantities of cotton north and manufactured goods south, along with a thriving passenger business between Baltimore and Norfolk. Railroads also began acquiring steamship lines in the 1850s, and the Seaboard & Roanoke Railroad, a predecessor of the Richmond, Fredericksburg and Potomac Railroad (RF&P), acquired a controlling interest in the Baltimore Steam Packet Company in 1851. As competitors entered the field, each line vied to outdo its competitors in the luxurious appointments of their ships' staterooms and dining service. The company acquired newer and larger ships in the 1850s, such as North Carolina in 1852 and Louisiana in 1854, the latter at 266 feet (81 m) in length being the largest wooden vessel the company would own. A passenger on Georgia was effusive in his description of an overnight trip in 1853:

I know of no more delightful trip from Baltimore down the Chesapeake...upon the broad blue waters with an exquisite breeze, which came up with invigorating freshness from the silver waves. Night came on, and her azure curtain gemmed with myriad stars was drawn over the expanse above.

— W.S. Forrest, Historical Sketches of Norfolk, 1853

North Carolina similarly impressed a Baltimore Patriot reporter in 1852, who described the ship's dining saloon as "having imported Belgian carpets, velvet chairs with marble-topped tables, and white panelling with gilded mouldings".

On February 20, 1858, the northbound steamer Louisiana collided with a sailing vessel hauling a catch of oysters, William K. Perrin, causing the sailboat to founder near the mouth of the Rappahannock River. In a case that reached the U.S. Supreme Court, Haney et al. v Baltimore Steam Packet Company, Louisiana was found to be at fault. The high court considered the rules of the sea pertaining to steamers and sailing ships approaching one another and concluded (with Chief Justice Roger B. Taney dissenting) that "entire disregard of these rules of navigation by the steamer" caused the collision, reversing a Circuit Court ruling.

North Carolina burned on January 29, 1859, when a fire started in a passenger stateroom. She sank the following day with the loss of two lives. The following month, the line acquired Adelaide to replace the lost steamer.

=== 1860s–1910s ===
The outbreak of the Civil War in April 1861 immediately affected the Baltimore Steam Packet Company. On April 19, two days after Virginia's secession, a violently pro-Southern mob in Baltimore attacked Union soldiers en route to Washington, D.C., as the troops marched through the city's streets between railroad stations. Thereafter known as the Baltimore riot of 1861, the resulting loss of life and local unrest also threatened the USS Allegheny, a U.S. Navy ship in Baltimore at the time. Later that same day, the Baltimore Steam Packet Company declined to transport Union forces from Baltimore to the beleaguered Union naval yard facility at Portsmouth, Virginia.

Two weeks later, on May 7, the US Navy chartered Adelaide and attached her to the Atlantic Blockading Squadron. In that role, she was used to transport Federal troops in support of operations in North Carolina's Outer Banks, directed against the Confederate-held forts guarding Hatteras Inlet. Later that year, Adelaide was returned to the Baltimore Steam Packet Company.

As a steamship line connecting northern cities and the south, the Old Bay Line hauled a considerable volume of freight between the two regions and their ships' cargo holds were filled with bales of cotton, produce, and other goods. When hostilities commenced, Southern ports were blockaded by the Federal Navy and the Old Bay Line was unable to serve Norfolk for the duration of the war, going no further south than Old Point Comfort. Passenger traffic as well as cargo shipping declined significantly. The Powhatan Line discontinued operations altogether between Norfolk and Richmond until the war's end.

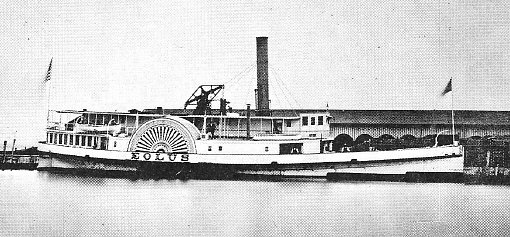
The Old Bay Line's Eolus in 1869

As soon as the war ended in 1865, the Leary Line of New York briefly challenged the Baltimore Steam Packet Company on the Chesapeake, starting its own Baltimore-Norfolk steamship service. A fare war ensued, with one-way prices reduced to $3.00 (equivalent to $30.65 in 2025). Emphasizing the longevity of its service compared to their upstart rival, the Baltimore Steam Packet Company began referring to itself as the "Old Established Bay Line" in advertising, a moniker that would soon become simply the Old Bay Line for the next century.

The Leary Line withdrew in January 1867, selling its George Leary to the Old Bay Line. Two years later, the Norfolk Journal of August 2, 1869, described the vessel as having a "gorgeous style of furniture and elegant fittings...magnificently furnished with upholstered sofas and lounges of rich red velvet...". Another competitor, the Chesapeake Steamship Company, began directly competing on the Baltimore-Norfolk route in 1874. Controlled by the Southern Railway, a rival of the RF&P, it would be a formidable competitor until 1941, when the two steamship lines merged. Cargo traffic was also booming in the 1870s as the South recovered from the Civil War, resulting in the Old Bay Line's freight revenue surpassing passenger revenue by the end of the decade.

By the time of John Moncure Robinson's retirement as president of the company in 1893, the Old Bay Line had upgraded its fleet with propeller-driven, steel-hulled steamers equipped with modern conveniences such as electric lighting and staterooms with private baths. Georgia introduced in 1887 was the first Old Bay Line boat to have a modern screw propeller instead of old-fashioned side paddlewheels and Alabama launched in 1893 was the company's first steel-hulled vessel. Robinson served the Old Bay Line as president for 26 years (1867–1893), longer than any other person in the company's history.

The halcyon days of the 1890s were the company's heyday, under president Richard Curzon Hoffman (the grandfather of noted author Walter Lord), when the prosperous line's gleaming steamships were heavily patronized by passengers enjoying the well-appointed staterooms and Chesapeake Bay culinary delights while dining to the accompaniment of live music. The nightly menu on board included oyster fritters, diamondback terrapin, duck, and turkey.

The company built a new terminal and headquarters in Baltimore on Light Street in 1898 to accommodate the increasing traffic. Rebuilt after the Great Baltimore Fire of 1904, the building with its four-sided clocktower would be a landmark for decades on Baltimore's Inner Harbor waterfront. (The location of the now-demolished terminal is between the present Harborplace and Maryland Science Center.)

The Richmond, Fredericksburg and Potomac Railroad, which had first acquired a controlling interest in the Baltimore Steam Packet Company in 1851, gained total control of the company's stock on September 5, 1901. The Old Bay Line continued to be managed separately from the RF&P, however.

==== World War I and aftermath ====
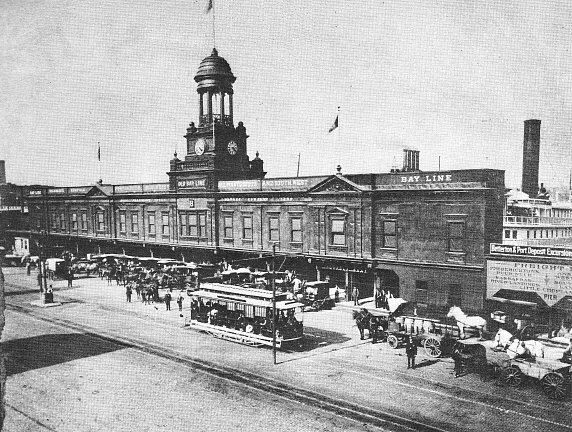
The Old Bay Line's Baltimore terminal (1898–1950)

In contrast to the Civil War, when hostilities sharply curtailed business on the Old Bay Line, World War I doubled freight and passenger business on the line to the busy ports of Norfolk and the Hampton Roads area, with 107,664 passengers using the line in 1917. As a result of congestion on the nation's railroads and ports when the U.S. entered the war in April 1917, the Federal government established the wartime U.S. Railroad Administration (USRA) to take charge of railroads and steamship companies, including the Baltimore Steam Packet Company. The USRA directed the operations of the Old Bay Line and the rival Chesapeake line for the duration of the war and more than a year thereafter, until March 1, 1920.

Baltimore-native John Roberts Sherwood, who had joined the Old Bay Line as a 22-year-old engineer in 1868 and became president in 1907, retired in October 1918 after 49 years with the company. The Baltimore Sun extolled Sherwood's distinguished half-century of service to the steamer line when he retired, noting approvingly that his oft-expressed philosophy was, "Stand up for your home city wherever you may go." (His son, John W. Sherwood, founded Baltimore's celebrated Sherwood Gardens in the mid-1920s.) Sherwood was succeeded by S. Davies Warfield as president (1918–1927).

Catastrophe struck the Old Bay Line on May 24, 1919, when Virginia II caught fire shortly after midnight in the middle of Chesapeake Bay with 156 passengers and a crew of 82 on board. The ship burned completely as many passengers jumped overboard and a lifeboat capsized. The Chesapeake Line's City of Norfolk and other vessels came to the rescue and pulled people from the water to safety. Virginia's captain, Walter Lane, remained with his ship to the end and suffered burns.

=== 1920s–1930s ===
Corporate ownership of the Baltimore Steam Packet Company changed again in 1922, when the Seaboard Air Line Railroad (SAL) formed the Seaboard–Bay Line Company, which owned all of the outstanding shares of the Baltimore Steam Packet Company, making the steamship company a wholly owned subsidiary of the SAL on February 6, 1922. In addition to the infusion of capital from the SAL, the Old Bay Line also obtained a $4.4 million federal loan (equivalent to $84.6 million in 2025) to build two new steamers: State of Maryland and State of Virginia. The Old Bay Line's president, S. Davies Warfield, was named president of SAL railroad operations as well as the Old Bay Line in 1922.

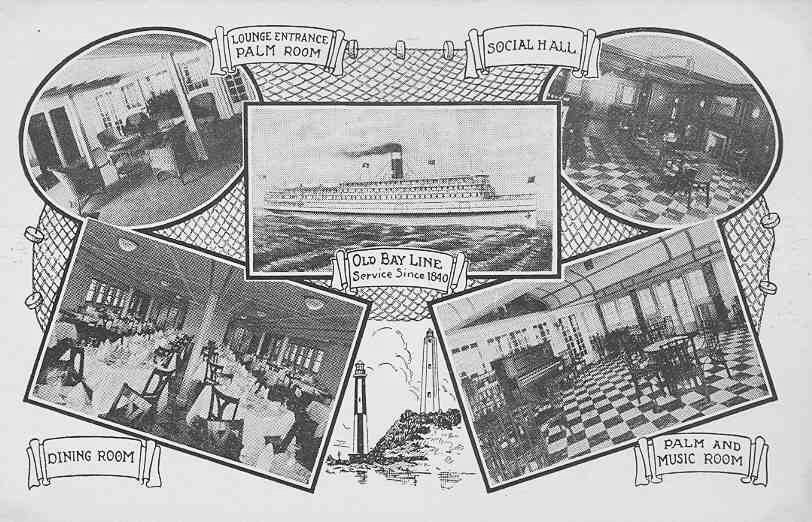
A late 1920s advertisement of an Old Bay Line ship's interior

In 1928, the Baltimore Steam Packet Company took delivery of two more new ships—President Warfield and Yorktown. President Warfield, built by Pusey and Jones Corp. in Wilmington, Delaware, was named for the Old Bay Line's president of the time, S. Davies Warfield. She would be the last new ship built for the Old Bay Line.

As Ford Model T's and other early automobiles increasingly took to the roads in the 1920s, inland steamship lines in the U.S. initially resisted carrying automobiles. By the Depression-ravaged 1930s, however, the Old Bay Line became one of the first to promote carriage of automobiles in order to fill its ships' empty cargo holds. The Depression and loss of business to improved highways took an increasing toll of many U.S. steamship lines in the 1930s, as historic companies such as the Fall River Line ceased operation in 1937, preceded by the Lake Champlain company, which was the oldest steamboat line in the U.S. at its demise in 1932.

Fortunately for the Old Bay Line, its freight and passenger traffic remained relatively strong in the 1930s and the company embarked on a modernization program for its main ships. President Warfield and State of Maryland were converted from coal to oil burning in 1933 and had sprinkler systems installed in 1938. In 1939, State of Virginia was converted to oil burning and all three ships were equipped with radio direction finders and ship-to-shore telephones.

=== 1940s ===
As the Old Bay Line celebrated its centennial in 1940 with parades and other events in Baltimore, the company's future seemed bright. Business was steady and the company's facilities were in sound condition. Commemorative dinner plates in blue and pink decorated with a map of the Chesapeake Bay were introduced.

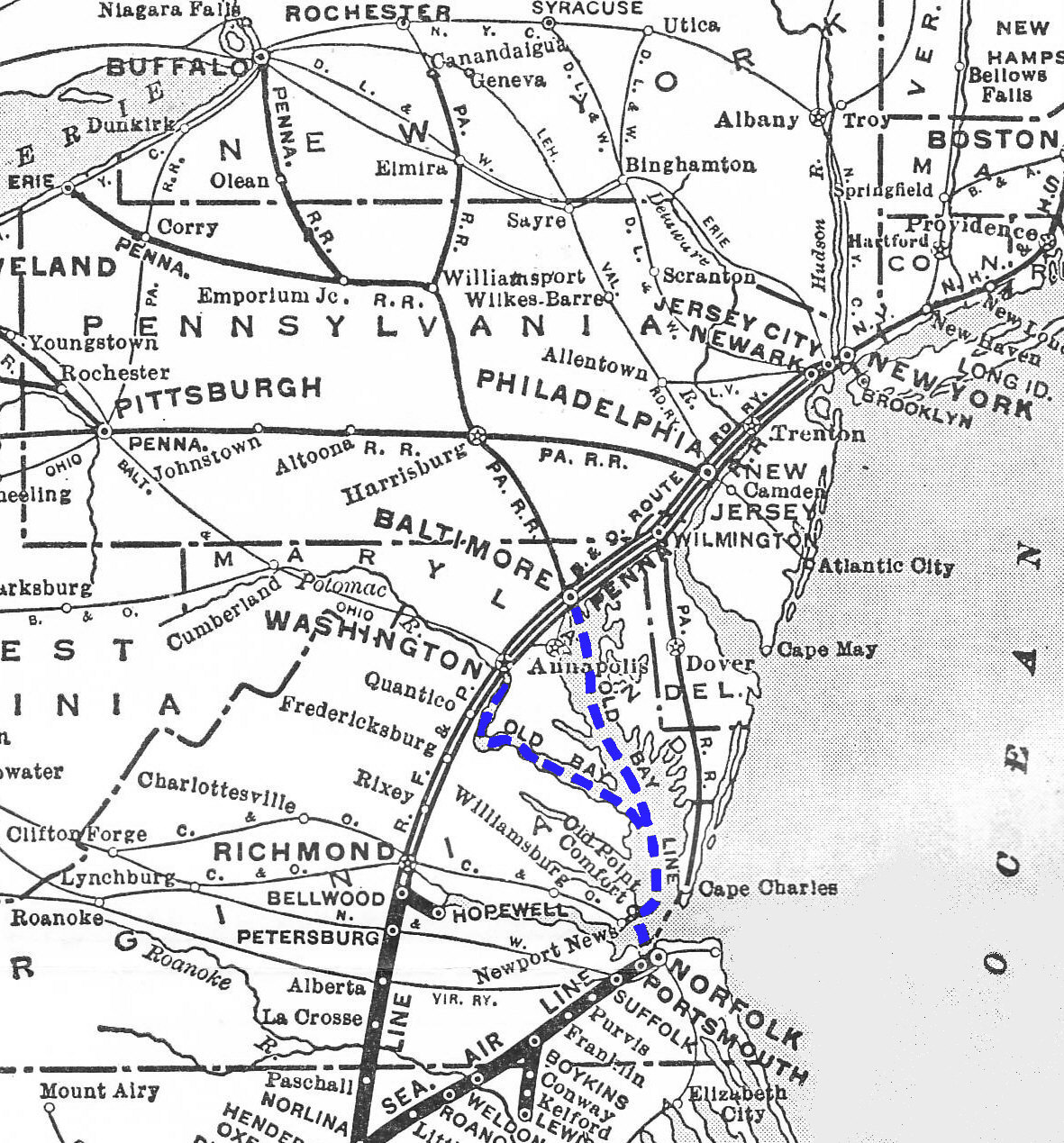
Old Bay Line routes (in blue)

On June 14, 1941, the Baltimore Steam Packet Company's owner, the Seaboard Air Line Railroad, entered into an agreement with a consortium of railroads and steamship companies to merge the Chesapeake Steamship Company into the Old Bay Line. The railroad group, consisting of the Atlantic Coast Line Railroad, Southern Railway, and the SAL, together controlled the Baltimore Steam Packet Company and the Chesapeake Steamship Company. As a result, the Old Bay Line took over the Chesapeake Line's business and assets and became the sole operator of passenger and freight steamship transportation between the important ports of Baltimore and Norfolk. As part of this agreement, half of the outstanding shares of the Baltimore Steam Packet Company were assigned to Chesapeake Steamship Company, which was one-third owned by Southern Railway and two-thirds owned by the Atlantic Coast Line Railroad. With the amalgamation, two of the Chesapeake Line's steamships, City of Norfolk and City of Richmond, were transferred to the Old Bay Line. As it turned out, these would be the last two vessels operated by the Old Bay Line when it went out of business in 1962. Robert E. Dunn was named president of the Old Bay Line in 1941, remaining at the helm of the company to the end of service in 1962.

==== World War II ====
After the United States entered World War II on December 7, 1941, the Federal government set up the War Shipping Administration to manage the vitally important maritime shipping and Naval support needs of the U.S. and its Allies, including the power to expropriate civilian-owned boats. On April 1, 1942, the government acquired the Old Bay Line's State of Virginia and State of Maryland. On July 13, President Warfield and Yorktown were also taken over. Thus, by mid-1942, four of the Old Bay Line's six ships had become government property, leaving the company only the two oldest and smallest ships in its fleet for the duration of the war, City of Norfolk and City of Richmond.

==== Postwar and Exodus ====
After World War II, the line promoted its automobile service to Florida-bound motorists, advertising the elimination of 230 miles (370 km) of driving by taking the family car on an overnight cruise down the Chesapeake to Virginia, while enjoying a sumptuous dinner and relaxing stateroom aboard an Old Bay Line steamer instead of a roadside motel. In March 1946, the Old Bay Line installed radar on City of Richmond and City of Norfolk, the first commercial passenger ships to be equipped with radar.

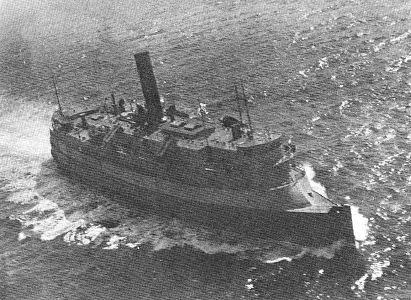
President Warfield en route to Europe in 1947, where she was later renamed Exodus

After President Warfield was expropriated in 1942 by the War Shipping Administration for national defense as a transport in World War II, she was transferred to the United Kingdom on September 21, 1942. Later in the war, she was returned to the US Navy and commissioned as USS President Warfield (IX-169) on May 21, 1944. Following the end of World War II, President Warfield was decommissioned and returned to the War Shipping Administration for disposal as surplus. After inspecting President Warfield, Old Bay Line officials decided that the expense for reconditioning the badly deteriorated ship was excessive, and accepted a cash settlement from the War Shipping Administration instead of taking back the war surplus vessel.

The old President Warfield was eventually acquired in early 1947 by Mossad Le'aliyah Bet, a Jewish organization helping Holocaust survivors illegally reach Mandatory Palestine, then under British rule. She was renamed Exodus when she embarked from France for Palestine on July 11, 1947, carrying 4,515 passengers. Two Royal Navy destroyers rammed her as she entered Palestinian waters near Haifa on July 18. British forces boarded the damaged ship and eventually deported her passengers. Exodus remained in Haifa harbor until 1952, when the derelict caught fire and burned completely. The 1960 film Exodus depicted the refugees' odyssey aboard her.

=== 1950s and demise ===
The Bay Line's Light Street terminal and headquarters building in Baltimore, where it had been located since 1898, were sold to the city in October 1950 for the widening of Light Street and later development as the acclaimed Inner Harbor waterfront festival marketplace. The company relocated to a pier on Pratt Street at the foot of Gay Street, where it remained until it went out of business in 1962.

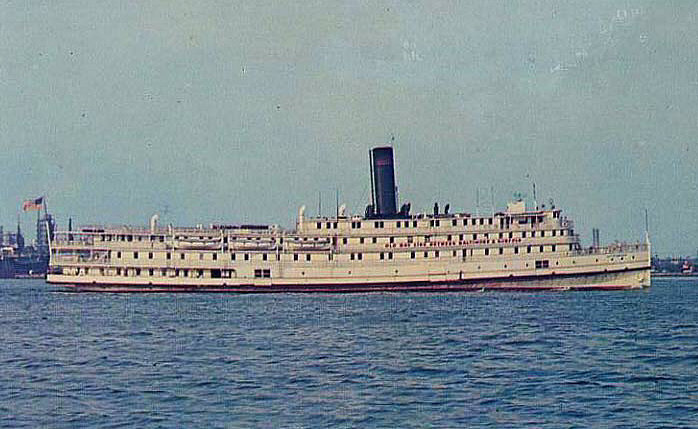
City of Richmond

Various travel writers in the 1950s extolled the pleasures of the nightly cruises and meals on the Old Bay Line's antique steamers. By the mid-1950s, however, improved highways and the increase in air travel meant that the Old Bay Line's 12-hour transit time between Baltimore and Norfolk was a comparatively slow means of transportation. Old Bay Line officials hoped that the steamship line's unique service might continue to appeal to travellers seeking the pleasures of a cruise on the scenic Chesapeake with fine dining en route and a well-furnished, private stateroom. The Sunday travel section of The New York Times in 1954 featured the "long established, more leisurely water route across Chesapeake Bay", as the writer described the Old Bay Line, recommending "the boat trip can be made comfortably and comparatively inexpensively every night between Baltimore, Old Point Comfort and Norfolk, and on alternate nights between Washington, D.C., and the Virginia communities".

In the end too few people opted for this leisurely form of travel and passenger volume steadily declined. As deficits rose during the 1950s, the Old Bay Line began cutting back. On September 30, 1957, it abandoned service to Washington, D.C., discontinuing its Washington–Norfolk overnight service on the Potomac River. By 1960, the Old Bay Line reduced operation of its mainstay Baltimore–Norfolk route to freight service only during the lightly travelled winter months of October–April, eliminating all passenger service on the Chesapeake Bay during those months. In October 1961, the company announced that its passenger service was "temporarily suspended until further notice", indicating that resumption of passenger service was expected the following summer season beginning in April 1962. Finally, on April 14, 1962, the venerable Old Bay Line discontinued all operations entirely, ending one of the last remaining overnight steamship passenger services in the United States (The Georgian Bay Line still operated out of Georgian Bay along with Canadian Pacific and Canada Steamship Lines but those companies engaged in purely cruising and all were out of service by 1967). The following month, the stockholders of the Baltimore Steam Packet Company formally voted on May 25, 1962, to liquidate the 122-year-old corporation.

== Routes operated ==
The routes over which the Baltimore Steam Packet Company operated passenger, mail, and freight service on a scheduled basis were:

Origin	Destination	Began	Ended
Baltimore, Maryland	Norfolk, Virginia	1840	1962
Washington, D.C.	Norfolk	1949	1957
Baltimore, Maryland	Richmond, Virginia	1874	1897
Baltimore, Maryland	Old Point Comfort, Va.	1840	1859
Norfolk, Virginia	Old Point Comfort, Va.	1840	1859

== Old Bay Line fleet ==
The company owned 54 ships during its 122 years of existence, many being small cargo vessels. Originally, all of the line's steamboats were of wooden construction with side paddlewheels and used wood logs for fuel. The first boat with an iron hull acquired by the Old Bay Line was Georgeanna, in 1860. By the late 1870s, the company had acquired its last paddlewheel steamers: Florida, Carolina, and Virginia. Later, ships would use coal for fuel until the 1930s, when oil began to be used. Beginning with Georgia built in 1887, their ships used the more modern propeller or "screw" design. Georgia also was the first Old Bay Line vessel to be equipped with electric lighting and steam heating. Passenger ships of the line provided large, lavishly furnished staterooms to accommodate passengers on the overnight trip. Alabama built in 1892 represented the inception of modern shipbuilding and design for the Old Bay Line: the first vessel to have a steel hull instead of iron or wood and propelled by a four-cylinder triple-expansion reciprocating engine, the same type engine that all of the line's later steamers would have. Notable Old Bay Line passenger vessels used in scheduled overnight service, with dates acquired and gross tonnages, were:

Key: paddlewheel propulsion (‡) steel-hull construction (¶)
Ship/Type	Built	Acquired	Length	Tonnage	Disposition	Notes
Pocahontas^{‡}	1829	1840	138 feet (42 m)	428 GT	sold 1845	built for Maryland & Delaware line
Georgia^{‡}	1836	1840	194 feet (59 m)	551 GT	sold 1865	built for Atlantic Line
Jewess^{‡}	1838	1840	173 feet (53 m)	352 GT	sank 1856	built for Maryland & Delaware line
Medora^{‡}	1842	–	189 feet (58 m)	–	exploded on April 15, 1842	wreck rebuilt as Herald
Herald^{‡}	1842	1842	184 feet (56 m)	329 GT	sold 1867	rebuilt from Medora, coal conversion 1852
North Carolina^{‡}	1852	1852	239 feet (73 m)	1,120 GT	sank on January 30, 1859	
Louisiana^{‡}	1854	1854	266 feet (81 m)	1,126 GT	sank 1874	
Adelaide^{‡}	1854	1859	233 feet (71 m)	972 GT	sold 1879	used by Navy in 1861
Georgeanna^{‡}	1859	1860	199 feet (61 m)	738 GT	sold 1869	first iron-hulled boat
Eolus^{‡}	1864	1865	144 feet (44 m)	731 GT	sold 1869	
Thomas Kelso^{‡}	1865	1865	237 feet (72 m)	1,430 GT	sold 1869	named in honor of Thomas Kelso
George Leary^{‡}	1864	1867	237 feet (72 m)	810 GT	sold 1879	bought from Leary Line
Florida^{‡}	1876	1876	259 feet (79 m)	1,279 GT	sold 1892	last wooden boat
Carolina^{‡}	1877	1877	251 feet (77 m)	984 GT	sold 1893	
Virginia^{‡}	1879	1879	251 feet (77 m)	990 GT	sold 1900	last paddlewheel boat
Georgia	1887	1887	280 feet (85 m)	1,749 GT	sold 1909	first screw-type boat
Alabama^{¶}	1893	1893	294 feet (90 m)	1,938 GT	sold 1928	first steel-hulled boat
Virginia II^{¶}	1905	1905	296 feet (90 m)	2,027 GT	burned at sea on May 24, 1919	
Florida II^{¶}	1907	1907	298 feet (91 m)	2,185 GT	sold 1924	
State of Maryland^{¶}	1922	1923	320 feet (98 m)	1,783 GT	requisitioned for World War II on April 2, 1942	converted to oil 1933
State of Virginia^{¶}	1923	1923	320 feet (98 m)	1,783 GT	requisitioned for World War II on April 1, 1942	converted to oil 1939
Yorktown^{¶}	1928	1941	269 feet (82 m)	1,547 GT	requisitioned for World War II on July 13, 1942	torpedoed and sank September 27, 1942
President Warfield^{¶}	1928	1928	320 feet (98 m)	1,814 GT	requisitioned for World War II on July 12, 1942	renamed as Exodus in 1947, burned in 1952
City of Norfolk^{¶}	1911	1941	297 feet (91 m)	2,379 GT	in service to 1962, on final roster	Chesapeake Line merger acquisition
City of Richmond^{¶}	1913	1941	261 feet (80 m)	1,923 GT	in service to 1962, on final roster	Chesapeake Line merger acquisition
District of Columbia^{¶}	1925	1949	298 feet (91 m)	2,128 GT	in service to 1956, on final roster	acquired from Norfolk and Washington line
Source: Brown (1961), pp. 160–71

At the time of the Old Bay Line's dissolution in April 1962, three ships remained docked at the Pratt Street pier: District of Columbia, which had been kept as a spare since the Washington–Norfolk service ended in 1957, was scrapped soon afterwards. City of Richmond was sold for use as a floating restaurant in the Virgin Islands, but sank in the Atlantic Ocean off Georgetown, South Carolina, while under tow to her new home. City of Norfolk was idled in Norfolk until 1966, when it was towed to Fieldsboro, New Jersey on the Delaware River and scrapped.
