= Charles Emanuel =

American football player (born 1973)

Profile
- Position: Safety

Personal information
- Born: June 3, 1973 (age 53); Indiantown, Florida

Career information
- College: West Virginia

Career history
- 1997: Minnesota Vikings
- 1997: Philadelphia Eagles
- 1999: Tampa Bay Buccaneers*
- 1999: Rhein Fire
- * Offseason or practice squad member only
- Stats at Pro Football Reference

Charles Edward Emanuel (born June 3, 1973, in Indiantown, Florida) is a former safety in the National Football League. He played for the Philadelphia Eagles. He played college football at West Virginia.
