= Sherwood Gardens =

Park in Baltimore, Maryland, United States

Coordinates: 39°20′29″N 76°36′51″W

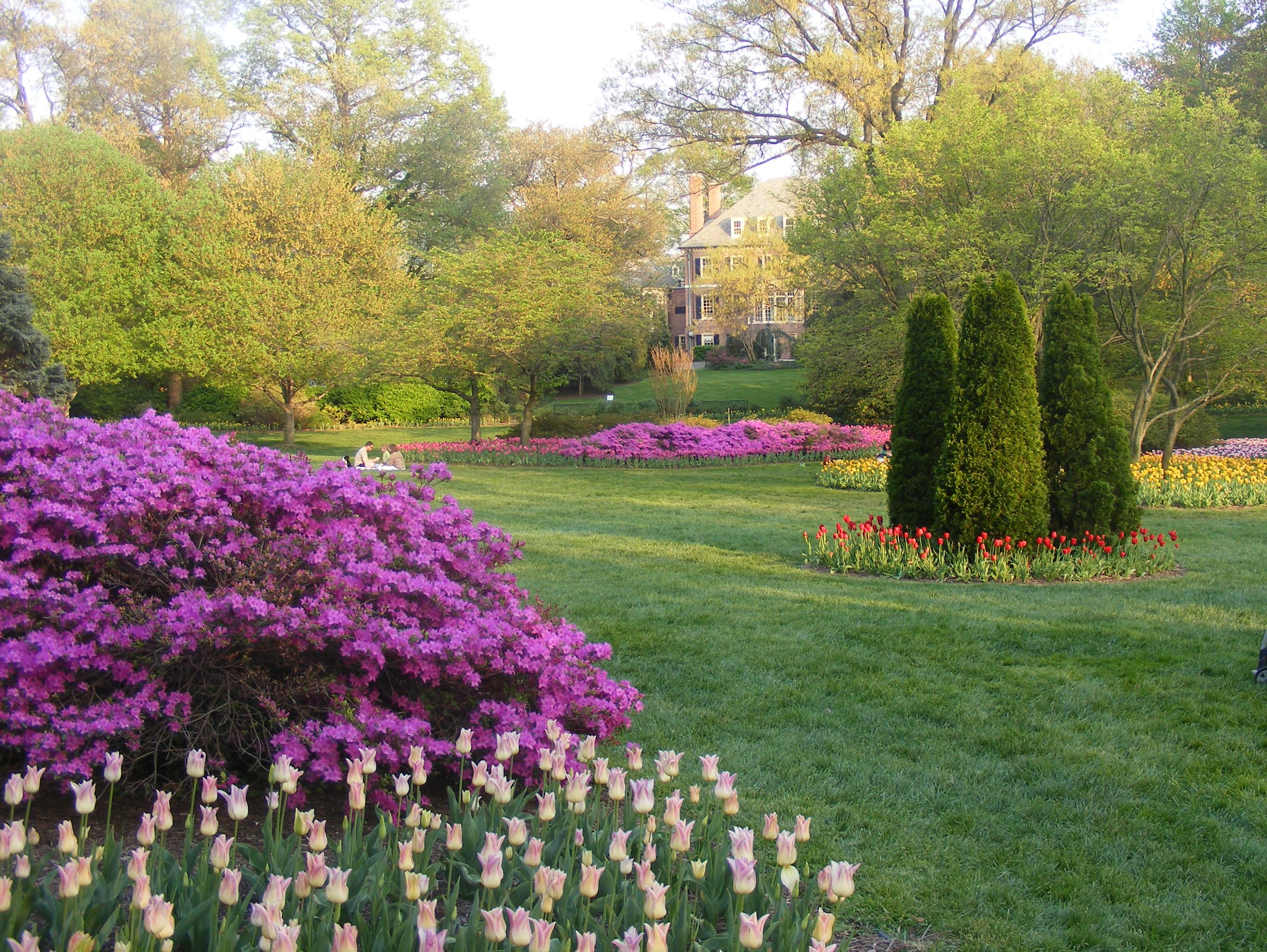
- Sherwood Gardens
- Interactive map of Sherwood Gardens
- Type: Public park
- Location: Baltimore, Maryland
- Area: 6 acres (2.4 ha)

Sherwood Gardens is a 6-acre (24,000 m^{2}) park located in the Guilford neighborhood of Northern Baltimore, Maryland. The gardens are bordered by East Highfield, Underwood, Stratford and Greenway Roads. In addition to well-groomed, standard ground cover (azaleas, evergreens, etc...), Sherwood Gardens is famous for its nearly 80,000 tulips that peak in late April. After the tulips finish blooming, the Tulip Dig occurs on the Saturday of Memorial Day each year. Anyone can dig up and purchase the tulip bulbs.

The park is maintained and managed by Stratford Green, Inc., a 501(c)(3) organization.

== History ==
During the 1800s, the property on which the Sherwood Gardens rest was part of the Guilford estate of A S. Abell, founder of The Baltimore Sun. The location of the gardens was a pond, which was filled in when the area was developed for housing in 1912 and named Stratford Green by the Olmsted Brothers who designed it and the Guilford community. John W. Sherwood, a son of the president of the Baltimore Steam Packet Company (the "Old Bay Line") and one-time chairman of the Sinclair Oil Company, began planting tulip beds, azaleas and other flora on his property, adjacent to Stratford Green, in the 1920s. He allowed the public to visit his gardens during the month of May. Sherwood planted his gardens with tulips imported from the Netherlands. Following his death in 1965, Sherwood Gardens was acquired by The Guilford Association, Inc. which then expanded them. The gardens, which were transferred to Stratford Green, Inc., a 501(c)(3) organization, are private property and receive no public funding, but are open to the public year-round.
