= Nick McLean =

American cinematographer (born 1941)

- Born: George Nicholas McLean; May 29, 1941 (age 85); Santa Monica, California, U.S.
- Years active: 1961–2006

George Nicholas McLean (born May 29, 1941) is an American cinematographer.

== Early life ==
McLean was born in Santa Monica, California, the son of George McLean and Dorothy Jane (née Scott), and raised in the San Fernando Valley. His family was highly involved in the entertainment industry. His uncle was an actor and his step-father, Fred Jackman, Jr. was a cinematographer and the son of the second president of the American Society of Cinematographers.

McLean attended North Hollywood High School, and earned a football scholarship to the University of Southern California.

== Career ==
After graduating, McLean opened a pool hall and a body and fender shop in Van Nuys, California. After this, Jackman introduced McLean to the camera department at Columbia Pictures. He started working as a clapper boy in 1966 for the television series The Iron Horse. In 1969, McLean became a second assistant cameraman at Universal Studios, working on many shows, before providing aerial cinematography for the film Red Sky at Morning.

While working as a cameraman on the film Sharky's Machine, McLean was approached by Burt Reynolds, who directed the film; Reynolds offered him a job as the cinematographer for his film Stroker Ace, which McLean accepted. As another favor, Reynolds offered for McLean to shoot the sitcom Evening Shade. From that point onwards, McLean worked on various film and television projects, as camera operator and director of photography.

In 2002, McLean received an Emmy nomination for Outstanding Cinematography in a Multicamera Series for his work on Friends.

== Filmography ==
=== Film ===
| Year | Title | Director | Notes |
|---|---|---|---|
| 1979 | Cheech & Chong's Next Movie | Tommy Chong | With King Baggot |
| 1982 | Stroker Ace | Hal Needham | Also made an uncredited cameo as "Walter" |
| 1983 | Staying Alive | Sylvester Stallone | |
| 1983 | Cannonball Run II | Hal Needham | |
| 1984 | City Heat | Richard Benjamin | |
| 1985 | Stick | Burt Reynolds | |
| 1985 | Twice in a Lifetime | Bud Yorkin | |
| 1985 | The Goonies | Richard Donner | Also made a cameo as "Mouth's Father" |
| 1986 | Short Circuit | John Badham | |
| 1987 | Spaceballs | Mel Brooks | |
| 1988 | Mac and Me | Stewart Raffill | |
| 1995 | The Maddening | Danny Huston | |
| 1999 | The Last Producer | Burt Reynolds | |

=== Television ===
| Year | Title | Director | Notes |
|---|---|---|---|
| 1988-1989 | CBS Summer Playhouse | Aaron Lipstadt; Steve Miner | Segments "The Pretenders" and "B-Men" |
| 1988-1989 | B.L. Stryker | | 11 episodes; Also directed episode "High Rise" |
| 1990 | Elvis | Steve Miner | Episode "Moody's Blues" |
| 1990-1993 | Evening Shade | | All 99 episodes |
| 1992 | Hearts Afire | Harry Thomason | Episode "Bees Can Sting You, Watch Out" (Part 1 & 2) |
| 1995-1996 | The Home Court | | All 20 episodes |
| 1995-1999 | Cybill | | 74 episodes |
| 1998-1999 | Veronica's Closet | | 42 episodes |
| 2000-2004 | Friends | | 99 episodes |
| 2000 | Cursed | | 7 episodes |
| 2002-2003 | Life with Bonnie | Bonnie Hunt; John Bowab | 21 episodes |
| 2004-2005 | Listen Up | | 5 episodes |
| 2004 | Life on a Stick | Andy Ackerman; Richard Owen Ransom | Episode "Pilot" |
| 2005 | Hot Properties | Jeff Melman | 5 episodes |
| 2004-2006 | Joey | | 35 episodes |
| 2006 | 'Til Death | Ted Wass | Episode "Sex for Furniture" |

TV movies

| Year | Title | Director |
|---|---|---|
| 1991 | Maverick Square | Steve Miner |
| 1993 | Harlan & Merleen | Burt Reynolds |
| 1993 | The Man from Left Field | Burt Reynolds |
