= The Man from Left Field =

1993 television film directed by Burt Reynolds

- DVD Cover
- Genre: Comedy; Drama
- Written by: Wayne A. Rice
- Directed by: Burt Reynolds
- Starring: Burt Reynolds; Reba McEntire
- Music by: Bobby Goldsboro
- Country of origin: United States
- Original language: English

Production
- Executive producers: Burt Reynolds; Lamar Jackson; Renée Valente
- Producer: Wayne A. Rice
- Production locations: Indiantown, Florida; Jupiter, Florida
- Cinematography: Nick McLean
- Editor: Tony Hayman
- Running time: 96 minutes
- Production company: Burt Reynolds Productions

Original release
- Network: CBS
- Release: October 15, 1993

The Man from Left Field is a 1993 American made-for-television comedy-drama film written and directed by Burt Reynolds. He stars along with Reba McEntire. The film was broadcast on CBS at 9:00 p.m. Eastern Time on October 15, 1993.

== Plot ==
A team of local boys are let down by every man they know they can't find a coach for their baseball team. When they find a drifter in left field who refuses to speak, they claim him as their coach and dub him "Jack Robinson" after baseball legend Jackie Robinson. Seeing how poorly the boys play, "Jack" gives them some tips out of frustration. Over the course of the summer he helps the boys with their personal problems and conflicts while they encourage him to find work.

When one of the boys almost drowns, "Jack" jumps in and saves him. The experience helps him to remember that he had a daughter who drowned and that he had checked out from society from that day on. Beau's mother encourages him to go back to his home and he returns to his old life as Buddy Lee Howser, retired player for the Kansas City Athletics and current practicing doctor. On the opening day of the season, "Coach" flies in on a helicopter to honor his commitment to the team on.

== Cast ==
- Burt Reynolds as Jack Robinson
- Reba McEntire as Nancy Lee Prinzi
- Kauwela Acocella as Beau Prinzi
- Derek Baxter as Malcolm
- Adam Cronan as Bama Block
- Sean Dunne as Peanut
- Mattox Gardener as J.C

Christina Bullock as girl in the stands

== Reception ==
People gave the film a C−. TV Guide gave the film 2 out of 5 stars. Using a baseball analogy, Patricia O'Connell of Variety wrote, "This occasionally charming tale of a Little League team from the wrong side of the tracks and the drifter/coach who nurtures them could have hit a home run, but instead settles for a double, and falters somewhere around the fifth inning. Lack of focus and loose plot threads weaken the telepic."

== See also ==
- List of baseball films
