= USS Adelaide =

American steamer

History

United States
- Launched: 1854
- In service: circa 10 May 1861
- Out of service: circa September 1861

General characteristics
- Type: Steamer
- Displacement: 734 long tons (746 t)
- Length: 233 ft (71 m)
- Beam: 32 ft 1 in (9.78 m)
- Draft: 8 ft 10 in (2.69 m)
- Propulsion: steam engine; side wheel-propelled

USS Adelaide was a steamer chartered by the Union Navy during the beginning of the American Civil War. She was used by the Union Navy as a transport in support of the Union Navy blockade of Confederate waterways.

== Service history ==
Sidewheel steamer Adelaide was built in 1854 at Greenpoint, Long Island, New York, by the firm of Lupton and McDermott for Cornelius Vanderbilt who intended to send her round Cape Horn for service in the rivers and shallow coastal waters of California during the Gold Rush. However, changing business conditions caused this plan to be cancelled; and the ship was sold while she was still under construction to the Calais, Maine, Steamboat Company for which she operated as a passenger packet between Boston, Massachusetts, and New Brunswick, Canada. The Baltimore Steam Packet Company purchased the vessel early in February 1859 to replace its steamer North Carolina which had caught fire at sea while en route to Norfolk, Virginia on 29 January of that year, and had sunk early the following morning. Adelaide arrived at Norfolk late in February and took up duty carrying passengers between that city and Baltimore, Maryland.

On 7 May 1861, after having plied the waters of the Chesapeake Bay on this run for over two years, the steamer arrived at Old Point Comfort, Virginia, her last stop on her route south before Norfolk. She was detained there by Union naval authorities and forbidden to proceed further south since all of the southern coast in Confederate hands was under blockade. A few days later, the Union Navy chartered the ship to serve as a transport attached to the Atlantic Blockading Squadron. She performed her most important naval service late in the summer of 1861 when she carried Union troops to Hatteras Inlet for combined operations against the forts guarding the entrance to the North Carolina sounds. This operation on 28–29 August enabled the Union Navy to control these important waters, and it led ultimately to the Confederate evacuation of Norfolk.

Soon thereafter, the Navy returned the ship to her owner for whom she resumed runs out of Baltimore, which she continued through the end of the war and for many years thereafter. Rebuilt by William Skinner and Sons in 1871, the ship was turned over to Harlan and Hollingsworth in 1879 in partial payment for that firm's construction of the new steamer Virginia. The following year, she began operating out of Long Branch, New Jersey. On 19 June 1880, Adelaide was rammed by the excursion boat Grand Republic and sank in New York Harbor.
