= S. Davies Warfield =

American railroad executive and banker (1859–1927)

- Warfield in Arcadia, Florida, on January 7, 1927, celebrating the inaugural run of the Orange Blossom Special into southwest and southeast Florida
- Born: September 4, 1859; Baltimore, Maryland, U.S.
- Died: October 24, 1927 (aged 68); Baltimore, Maryland, U.S.
- Father: Henry Mactier Warfield

Signature
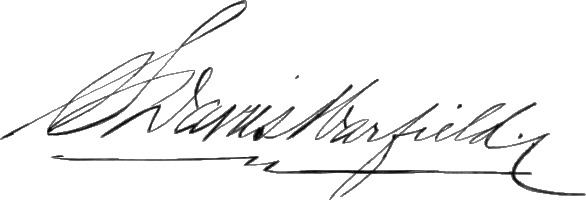

Solomon Davies Warfield (September 4, 1859 – October 24, 1927) was an American railroad executive and banker. He is primarily remembered for extending the Seaboard Air Line Railway into South Florida in the 1920s and for connecting the east and west coasts of Florida by rail. To this day, Amtrak trains travel from Central Florida to South Florida on the route built by Warfield.

== Personal life ==
Warfield was born in Baltimore County, Maryland, the son of Henry Mactier Warfield and Anna W. Emory Warfield, and was named for a friend of his father's, Sol B. Davies. Warfield's father was a prominent grain merchant and director of the Baltimore and Ohio Railroad. He was a paternal uncle of Wallis Warfield Simpson (later the Duchess of Windsor), for whom King Edward VIII of the United Kingdom (later the Duke of Windsor) abdicated his throne in 1937. Warfield never married.

He was appointed postmaster of Baltimore on June 1, 1894.

He died at Union Memorial Hospital in Baltimore, on October 24, 1927.

== Corporate positions ==
- President of the Seaboard Air Line Railway
- President of the Continental Trust Company of Baltimore
- President of the Baltimore Steam Packet Company, ("Old Bay Line")
- Director of the Maryland Casualty Company
- Director of the New York Life Insurance Company

== SS President Warfield ==
A few months after Warfield's death, the SS President Warfield was built in 1928 by Pusey and Jones Corporation, in Wilmington, Delaware, for the century-old Baltimore Steam Packet Company, also known as the "Old Bay Line," operating steamships on Chesapeake Bay between Baltimore and Norfolk, Virginia, their Chesapeake Bay. The Old Bay Line was controlled by the Seaboard Air Line Railway; Warfield was president of both companies in the 1920s.

During World War II, the President Warfield was acquired by the U. S. government and transferred to Great Britain in 1942 under the Lend-Lease program to serve as a troop transport. In 1944, the ship was put under U. S. Navy control, and was laid up as surplus in 1945 after the war ended.

Purchased by an agent of the Haganah and renamed Exodus 1947, the ship was briefly in the world spotlight as one of several vessels attempting to carry Jewish refugees to British-controlled Mandatory Palestine. This incident was later the subject of the 1958 novel Exodus by Baltimorean Leon Uris, (1924–2003) and the motion picture based upon it, released in 1960. The ship remained in Haifa harbor until it burned to the waterline in 1952, and was later scrapped.
