= Animal Rights National Conference =

US animal rights annual conference

- Frequency: Yearly
- Location: Various in the United States
- Established: 2000; 26 years ago
- Organized by: Farm Animal Rights Movement
- Website: arconference.org

The Animal Rights National Conference is an annual conference in the United States. Started in 1981 under a different name, since 2000 it has been organized by Farm Animal Rights Movement (FARM).

== History ==
In the 1970s, Alex Hershaft started noticing that animal rights people were attending his vegetarian conferences. After discussing with them and doing more reading on the subject, in 1981 he organized Action for Life, a joining of the vegetarian and animal rights movements, and launched a series of annual conferences. These conferences were held annually for seven years (1981–1987) and typically included training sessions for activists, networking, ceremonial activities, video showings, and open discussions. The conferences helped spawn other animal rights organizations with different focuses, including Farm Animal Rights Movement (Hershaft's organization), People for the Ethical Treatment of Animals, Trans-Species Unlimited, Mobilization for Animals, and Animal Rights Network.

Peter Linck of the National Alliance for Animals had also been holding conferences in the 1980s, and those became the successors to the Action for Life conferences from 1988 to 1996.

In 1997, FARM stepped up to again organize the national conferences, alternating between east and west coast venues.

In 2004, after the prosecution of a few animal rights activists as terrorists, the Humane Society of the United States and a few other animal protection groups withdrew their support for these conferences as they didn't want to advocate for violence. Those organizations formed their own annual conferences under the name "Taking Action for Animals". Likewise, Direct Action Everywhere hosts the Animal Liberation Conference.

In 2018, Alex Hershaft retired as Conference Chair. As of 2019 Jen Riley took on the post of Conference Chair and organizes the conferences along with Ethan Eldreth as Program Manager and a newly formed Program Advisory Committee.

== Conferences ==
As of 2021, a typical conference involves "2,000 attendees representing 90 organizations from a dozen countries, with 100 exhibitors and 170 speakers presenting in 80 sessions."

== Animal Rights Hall of Fame ==
Elected by the speakers of each annual conference, individuals who have made outstanding contributions towards animal rights in the US are inducted into the U.S. Animal Rights Hall of Fame. Previous winners include:

- 2000: Cleveland Amory, Howard Lyman, Ingrid Newkirk, Peter Singer, Henry Spira
- 2001: Gene Baur, Lorri Houston, Alex Hershaft, Jim Mason, Alex Pacheco
- 2002: Karen Davis, Shirley McGreal, Paul Watson
- 2003: Rodney Coronado, Elliot Katz
- 2004: Bruce Friedrich, Laura Moretti
- 2005: Matt Ball, Jack Norris, Gretchen Wyler
- 2006: Steve Hindi, Ben White
- 2007: Kevin Kjonaas, James Laveck, Jenny Stein
- 2008: Paul Shapiro
- 2009: Nathan Runkle
- 2010: Zoe Weil
- 2011: Carol J. Adams
- 2012: Joe Connelly and Colleen Holland
- 2013: Erica Meier
- 2014: Jon Camp
- 2015: Josh Balk
- 2016: Tom Regan
