= Moeller High School =

Archbishop Moeller High School
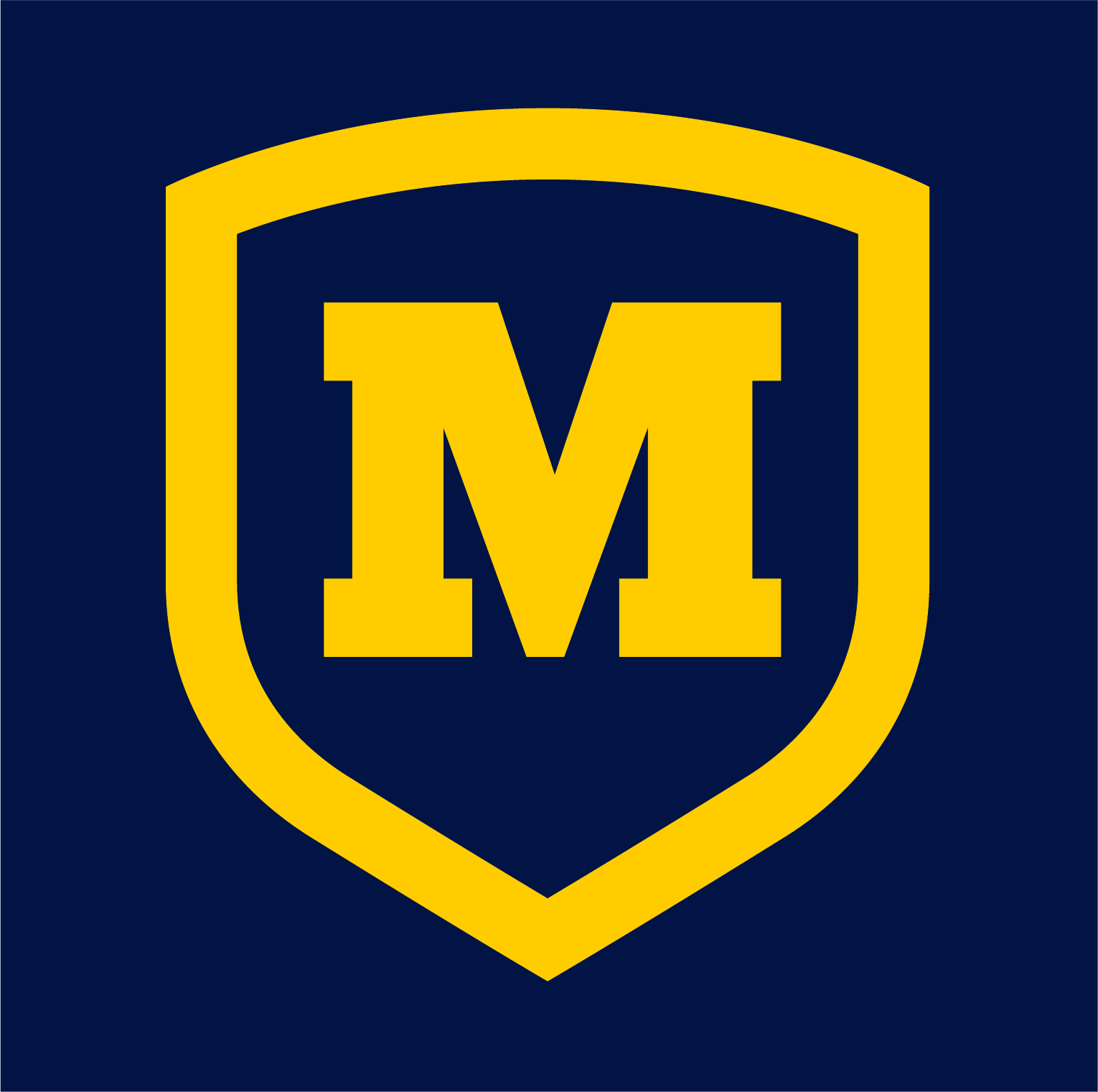

Location
- 9001 Montgomery Road; Cincinnati, Ohio 45242; United States; 39°13′12″N 84°21′30″W

Information
- School type: Private: Comprehensive; Parochial; College-preparatory
- Motto: Nova bella elegit Dominus (Latin: "The Lord has chosen new wars")
- Religious affiliations: Roman Catholic (Marianists)
- Established: September 1958; 68 years ago
- School district: Roman Catholic Archdiocese of Cincinnati
- CEEB code: 361033
- Principal: Michael Shaffer
- Teaching staff: 61.3 (on an FTE basis)
- Grades: 9–12
- Gender: Boys
- Enrollment: 869 (2021-2022)
- Average class size: 22.4
- Student to teacher ratio: 14.2
- Campus type: Suburban
- Colors: Navy Blue and gold
- Slogan: "Be Remarkable"
- Song: Crusaders' Anthem
- Fight song: Blue and Gold Fight
- Athletics conference: OHSAA – GCL South
- Mascot: Crusaders
- Accreditation: Ohio Catholic Accrediting Association
- Publication: The Squire
- Newspaper: The Crusader
- Yearbook: The Templar
- Website: www.moeller.org

Archbishop Moeller High School (/ˈmoʊlər/ MOH-lər), known as Moeller, is a private, all-male, college-preparatory high school in the suburbs of Cincinnati, in Hamilton County, Ohio, United States. It is one of five all-male Catholic high schools in the Cincinnati area.

== History ==
Archbishop Moeller High School was established in fall 1958 when Archbishop Karl J. Alter appointed Monsignor Edward A. McCarthy and Brother Paul Sibbing to supervise the planning and construction of a new high school near Montgomery, Ohio. Funds for the school were provided by Catholic parishioners in the Cincinnati area as part of the Archbishop's High School Fund Campaign. Archbishop Alter named the school Archbishop Moeller High School to commemorate the fourth Archbishop of Cincinnati, Henry K. Moeller.

Moeller High School opened its doors in September 1960, along with La Salle High School, a fellow Cincinnati Archdiocesan school. Marianist Brother Lawrence Eveslage was appointed the first principal, and the faculty consisted of Marianist priests and brothers as well as laity. Moeller High School's first class graduated in 1964. Since then, over 12,000 graduates have become Moeller High School alumni.

== Academics ==
=== Academic philosophy ===
Starting with the freshman class of 1999, Moeller High School adopted a new laptop program. All freshmen are required to lease laptops through the program to assist in education. Leasing costs are included as part of school tuition. The laptops are equipped to use the new network installed in the school, and teachers are encouraged to use the laptops to do more in the classroom. Common uses for the laptops include writing papers, doing research (using both the Internet and the school's reference systems), and presenting projects. Many textbooks have been replaced by electronic versions. Starting with the class of 2018, students began leasing Tablet PCs rather than standard laptops, allowing them to take notes within OneNote without needing to type.

=== Co-curriculars ===
As of 2024, more than 85% Moeller students are involved in co-curricular activities.

== School publications ==
The Crusader has a variety of content, including news, features, sports, and cultural information. The Journalism I and Journalism II classes are primarily responsible for reporting, writing, and designing the paper. Students outside of these classes are also encouraged to submit story ideas and content. All content is approved by the school's administration before it is published. In 2009, The Crusader moved from a quarterly to a monthly publication. In 2008, The Crusader won First Place, the second-highest honor a high school newspaper can receive from the American Scholastic Press Association.

The Squire is a student literary journal that features stories, poems, and essays written by Moeller students. It is printed annually, and all students may submit to The Squire at any time. The magazine also features student artwork. Selected works for publication are chosen by Moeller's Creative Writing Club, who also edit and publish the journal each year.

== Athletics ==
Moeller High School's athletic teams are sanctioned by the Ohio High School Athletic Association (OHSAA) and compete in the Greater Catholic League South, along with Elder, St. Xavier, and La Salle High Schools. The Greater Catholic League, more commonly known as the GCL, is often considered one of the premier high school conferences in the country.

In 2021, Moeller built Kremchek Stadium at the Bucher Athletic Complex in Clermont County. This is the first home field for Moeller baseball.

During the 1970s and 1980s, the football team won five national titles and many other championships. The team also won back-to-back Ohio State Championships in 2012 and 2013.

The baseball team produced Major League Baseball players Barry Larkin, Ken Griffey Jr., and Buddy Bell, and Brent Suter. The Crusaders won Division I state baseball championships in 2009, 2012, 2013, 2015, and 2023.

Since 1999 Moeller basketball has won 3 State Titles. In 2004, led by five starters who would go on to play NCAA Division I basketball, Moeller reached as high as the top 10 in USA Today's national poll.

=== OHSAA team championships ===
- Football – 1975, 1976, 1977, 1979, 1980, 1982, 1985, 2012, 2013
- Baseball – 1972, 1989, 1993, 2004, 2009, 2012, 2013, 2015, 2023
- Basketball – 1999, 2003, 2007, 2018, 2019
- Golf – 2014
- Lacrosse – 2017
- Volleyball – 2023, 2026
- Esports - 2023

=== Non-OHSAA championships ===
- Lacrosse – 1992, 1993, (Ohio High School Lacrosse Association)
- Volleyball – 1997, 1998, 2004, 2005, 2007, 2009, 2012, 2018, 2021, 2022 (Ohio High School Boys Volleyball Association)
- Rugby – 2010
- Ultimate Frisbee – 2018

The 2007 title went to the second team in Ohio high school boys' volleyball history to go undefeated.

The 2021, 2022, and 2023 Volleyball State Championship Teams is the first time in Boys Volleyball history to go back-to-back-to-back.

Lacrosse became a sanctioned OHSAA sport beginning with the 2016–17 academic year.

Volleyball became a sanctioned OHSAA sport beginning with the 2022–2023 academic year.

== Notable alumni ==
=== Media ===
- Paul Keels – play-by-play announcer for Ohio State University football and basketball on WBNS-FM

=== Politics ===
- John Boehner – U.S. Congressman for Ohio's 8th congressional district and 61st Speaker of the United States House of Representatives
- Frank Brogan – Lieutenant Governor of Florida.
- Tom Raga – Ohio State Representative, former Republican candidate for Lieutenant Governor of Ohio
- Bob Schaffer – U.S. Congressman for Colorado's 4th congressional district, Colorado State Senator 1987–1996, Chairman of the Colorado State Board of Education
- Joe Uecker – Ohio State Senator (R–66)

=== Sports ===
==== Baseball ====
- Buddy Bell – former third baseman and manager
- David Bell – son of Buddy Bell; former professional baseball player; former manager of the Cincinnati Reds
- Mike Bell – son of Buddy Bell and brother of David Bell; former third baseman for the Cincinnati Reds
- Andrew Brackman – former professional baseball player
- Ken Griffey Jr. – former outfielder/designated hitter for the Seattle Mariners, Cincinnati Reds and Chicago White Sox and National Baseball Hall of Fame member
- Adam Hyzdu – professional baseball player
- Barry Larkin – former shortstop for the Cincinnati Reds and National Baseball Hall of Fame member
- Stephen Larkin – brother of Barry Larkin; former 1st baseman for the Cincinnati Reds
- Bill Long – professional baseball player
- Len Matuszek – major league outfielder and first baseman
- Eric Surkamp – professional baseball player
- Brent Suter – professional baseball player for the Cincinnati Reds
- Alex Wimmers – professional baseball player for the Miami Marlins
- Phil Diehl – professional baseball player for the Cincinnati Reds
- Zach Logue – professional baseball player for the Oakland Athletics

==== Basketball ====
- Josh Duncan – college and international professional basketball player, Xavier Musketeers
- Logan Duncomb - college basketball player, Indiana Hoosiers, Winthrop Eagles, and Notre Dame Fighting Irish
- Jaxson Hayes - college and pro basketball player, 2019 first round NBA Draft lottery pick (#8), Texas Longhorns
- Byron Larkin – college basketball player, Xavier Musketeers's all-time leading scorer
- Miles McBride - college and pro basketball player, 2020 second round NBA Draft pick (#36), West Virginia Mountaineers
- Quinn McDowell – college and pro basketball player, William & Mary Tribe
- Mike Sylvester – college and pro basketball player, Dayton Flyers

==== Football ====
- Doug Williams – Lexington All-American and professional football NFL Houston Oilers offensive tackle
- Steve Sylvester. University of Notre Dame, Oakland Raiders Offensive Lineman, 3 Super Bowl Rings
- Bob Crable (1978) – Notre Dame All-American and professional football linebacker and National Football Foundation College Football Hall of Fame Class of 2017
- Russ Huesman – head college football coach for the Richmond Spiders
- Greg Jones – linebacker, Tennessee Titans; All-American at Michigan State; Super Bowl XLVI champion
- Mark Kamphaus – Arena Football League quarterback, Albany Firebirds
- Michael Muñoz – college football offensive lineman; son of Anthony Muñoz
- Rob Murphy – 2 time All-American offensive lineman at Ohio State University, 6 years in the NFL, 6 years in the CFL
- Matt Tennant – 2010 5th-round pick of the New Orleans Saints out of Boston College
- Tom Waddle – professional football player for the Chicago Bears. Radio personality on ESPN 1000 AM in Chicago
- Greg Hudson – NCAA Football coach - Notre Dame, Purdue, Florida State, East Carolina, Minnesota, Cincinnati, Connecticut
- Rico Murray – Undrafted free agent signed by the Cincinnati Bengals
- Tony Hunter – professional football player for Buffalo Bills and Los Angeles Rams. 12th pick in first round of 1983 NFL draft. Varsity captain in football, track, and basketball
- Greg Huntington – American football player
- Steve Apke – American football player
- Sam Hubbard – American football player for the Cincinnati Bengals
- David Lippincott – American Football Coach for the Oakland Raiders
- Steve Niehaus – was a defensive lineman in the NFL. He was the first ever draft pick for the Seattle Seahawks and the second player taken in the 1976 NFL draft
- Carrington Valentine – cornerback, Green Bay Packers
- Marcus Rush – former linebacker, Jacksonville Jaguars
- Brenden Bates – tight end, Cleveland Browns

=== Other ===
- Brent Brisben - Treasure Hunter – Co-founder of 1715 Fleet - Queens Jewels, LLC
- Jack Norris – President and co-founder of Vegan Outreach

== Notable faculty and staff ==
- Bob Crable (2000–2007) – Notre Dame All-American and professional football linebacker; later head coach and religion teacher at Moeller
- Gerry Faust – head football coach at Moeller; later head coach at the University of Notre Dame and University of Akron
- Geoffrey Girard – fiction writer; and is the current department head and a classroom teacher of English at Moeller
- Tim Rose (1964–1966) – assistant coach at Moeller; later head football coach at Miami University
