= England–Spain football rivalry =

International football rivalry

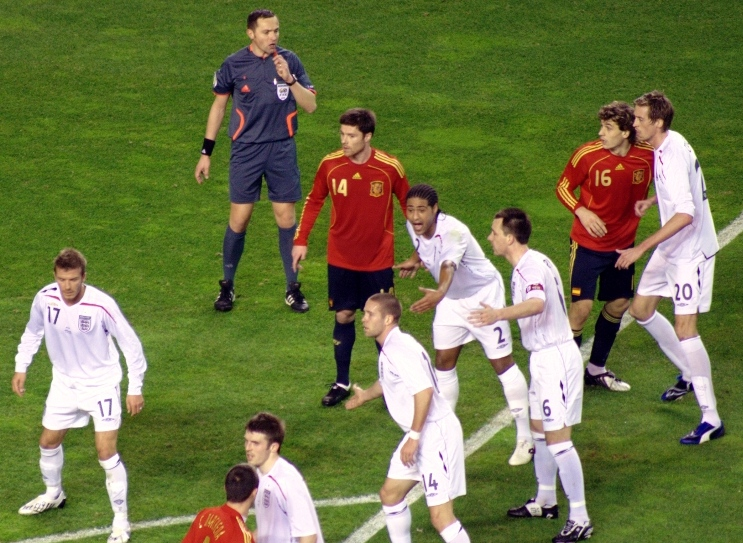
- Friendly match between Spain and England, held on February 11, 2009, at the Sánchez Pizjuán Stadium (Seville)
- Location: Europe (UEFA)
- Teams: England; Spain
- First meeting: 15 May 1929; Friendly; Spain 4–3 England
- Latest meeting: 15 November 2026; UEFA Nations League; Spain 2–3 England

Statistics
- Total meetings: 30
- Most wins: England (14)
- Top scorer: Gary Lineker (4)
- Largest victory: England 7–1 Spain (9 December 1931)
- Largest goal scoring: England 7–1 Spain (9 December 1931)

The England–Spain football rivalry is a competitive international association football rivalry between the national teams of England and Spain. First contested in May 1929, the fixture pits two of Europe's most prominent footballing nations against each other across major tournaments, including the FIFA World Cup, the UEFA European Championship, and the UEFA Nations League.

Their inaugural meeting in Madrid ended in a 4–3 victory for Spain, making them the first continental European team to defeat England. England responded with a 7–1 win in London in December 1931, which remains Spain's joint-heaviest defeat in international history. Historically, the two sides have contested several high-profile tournament matches, including Spain's 1–0 win at the 1950 FIFA World Cup, England's quarter-final penalty shoot-out victory at UEFA Euro 1996, and Spain's 2–1 victory in the UEFA Euro 2024 final in Berlin.

As of November 2026, the two teams have met 30 times at senior men's level, with the head-to-head record remaining closely balanced: England men's national football team have won 14 matches, Spain men's national football team have won 12, and 4 have ended in draws. Their most recent encounter took place on 15 November 2026 in Madrid, where England won 3–2 in the 2026–27 UEFA Nations League. Beyond the men's game, the rivalry has also gained prominence in women's international football, notably featuring the 2023 FIFA Women's World Cup final won by Spain women's national football team.

== History ==
=== Early years (1929–1931) ===
Spanish national football team before the friendly match against England in Madrid, 15 May 1929.

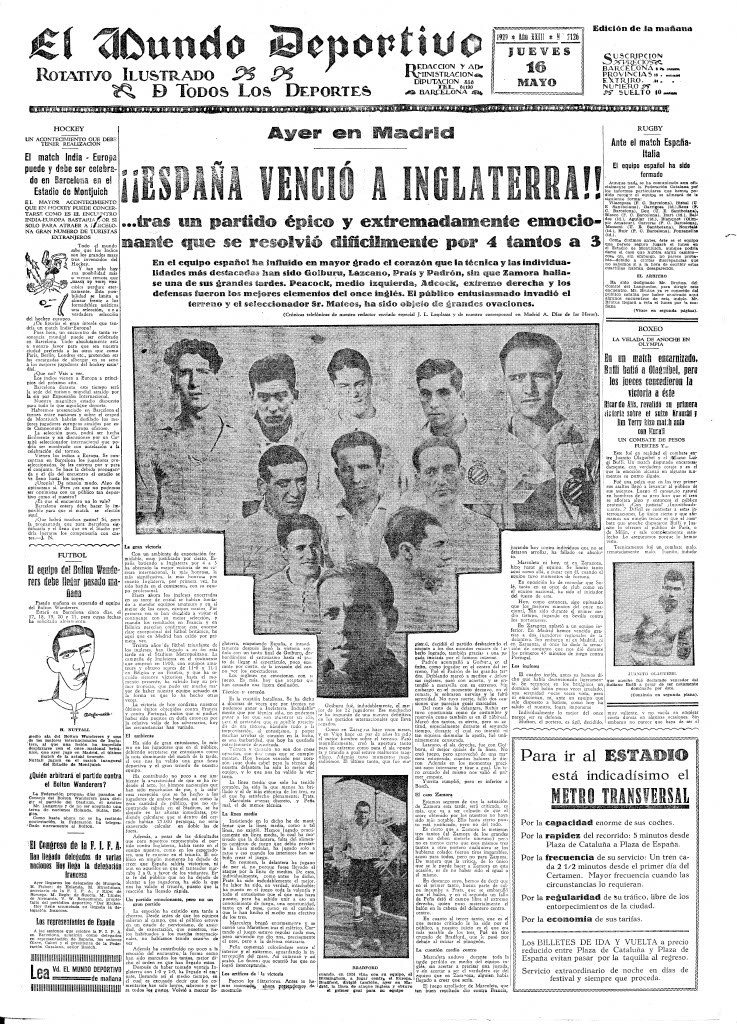
Front page of El Mundo Deportivo newspaper, 16 May 1929

The first meeting between England and Spain took place on 15 May 1929 at the Old Metropolitano de Madrid in front of approximately 45,000 spectators. At the time, England were widely regarded as the benchmark of world football and had never lost a match against a team from outside the British Isles. England took an early 2–0 lead inside the first 20 minutes through Joe Carter and Joe Bradford, before Spain equalised before half-time with goals from Gaspar Rubio and Jaime Lazcano. After Bradford restored England's advantage early in the second half, late strikes from Rubio and Severiano Goiburu secured a 4–3 comeback victory for Spain, making them the first continental European nation to defeat England.

England gained decisive revenge two years later in the return fixture on 9 December 1931 at Highbury in London, played before a crowd of 55,000. Fielding a full-strength side, England dominated from the outset, with Jack Smith and Tommy Johnson scoring inside the opening ten minutes. Smith added a third before the interval, and second-half goals from Sammy Crooks (2), Dixie Dean, and Johnson gave the hosts a 7–0 lead before Guillermo Gorostiza scored a late consolation goal for Spain. The 7–1 result remains Spain's joint-heaviest defeat in international history (alongside a 7–1 loss to Italy at the 1928 Summer Olympics)

=== The 1950 World Cup and post-war encounters (1950–1968) ===
The two nations met in a competitive fixture for the first time at the 1950 FIFA World Cup in Brazil, having been drawn into Group 2 alongside Chile and the United States. Following England's shock 1-0 defeat to the United States in Belo Horizonte, England needed a victory in the final group match at the Maracanã in Rio de Janeiro on 2 July 1950 to avoid elimination, while Spain required only a draw. In front of over 74,000 spectators, Spain won 1-0 through a 48th-minute goal by Telmo Zarra, finishing a quick counter-attack initiated by Gabriel Alonso and headed down by Agustín Gaínza. The result eliminated England in their first-ever World Cup appearance and sent Spain to the final round. In Spain, the match became a major cultural milestone during the Francoist era; with no live television broadcast available, the radio commentary by Matías Prats on Radio Nacional de España—and the contemporaneous political rhetoric framing the victory as a triumph over "Perfidious Albion" (la pérfida Albión)—cemented the goal in Spanish sporting folklore. During the 1950s and 1960s, the teams contested six international friendlies that produced several high-scoring results. After a 1–1 draw in Madrid in May 1955 and a 4–1 win for England at Wembley six months later, Spain recorded their biggest-ever victory over England on 15 May 1960 at the Santiago Bernabéu Stadium, winning 3–0 with goals from Joaquín Peiró and a brace by Eulogio Martínez. England responded five months later with a 4–2 win in London, and subsequently won consecutive friendlies in Madrid in December 1965 (2–0) and in London in May 1967 (2–0). The two sides met again in competitive play in the UEFA Euro 1968 quarter-finals,, played as a two-legged tie to determine qualification for the four-team final tournament in Italy. Reigning world champions England won the first leg 1–0 at Wembley on 3 April 1968 via an 84th-minute goal from Bobby Charlton. In the return leg in Madrid on 8 May 1968, Amancio Amaro put Spain ahead early in the second half to level the aggregate score, before goals from Martin Peters and Norman Hunter secured a 2–1 victory on the night and a 3–1 aggregate triumph for England.

== 1980s – early 1990 ==
After a thirteen-year hiatus without facing each other, the two sides met twice in 1980. Following a 2–0 friendly win for England at the Camp Nou in March, they were drawn together in Group B of UEFA Euro 1980 in Italy. Meeting in the final group fixture at the Stadio San Paolo in Naples on 18 June 1980, England won 2–1 with goals from Trevor Brooking and Tony Woodcock, either side of a Dani penalty for Spain—who also missed a second spot-kick through Dani saved by Ray Clemence—though both teams were eliminated from the tournament at the group stage. Spain responded in March 1981 by recording their first-ever win on English soil, defeating England 2–1 in a friendly at Wembley Stadium through goals from Roberto López Ufarte and Jesús María Zamora. At the 1982 FIFA World Cup, hosted by Spain, the two nations were paired in Second Round Group B alongside West Germany. By the time they met in the final group match at the Santiago Bernabéu Stadium on 5 July 1982, hosts Spain had already been eliminated following a 2–1 defeat to West Germany, whereas England needed to win by at least two clear goals to reach the semi-finals. Despite late pressure from England—including the return from injury of Kevin Keegan and Trevor Brooking as substitutes—the match ended in a 0–0 draw, eliminating both sides without defeat for England. On 18 February 1987, England defeated Spain 4–2 in a friendly at the Santiago Bernabéu Stadium in a match remembered for a four-goal performance by Gary Lineker. Playing for FC Barcelona at the time, Lineker scored all four of England's goals past his club teammate Andoni Zubizarreta after Emilio Butragueño had opened the scoring for Spain, before Ramón Vázquez netted a late consolation. The defeat ended a long unbeaten run for Spain in Madrid and remained England's last away victory in the Spanish capital for nearly four decades. The two teams next met on 9 September 1992 in a friendly at El Sardinero Stadium in Santander, at a low ebb for both national sides following disappointing campaigns—Spain having failed to qualify for UEFA Euro 1992, and England having been eliminated at the group stage. Marking the managerial debut of Javier Clemente for Spain, the hosts won 1–0 courtesy of a first-half goal by Gregorio Fonseca, piling further pressure on England manager Graham Taylor.

== Euro 1996 and media tensions ==
England and Spain met in the quarter-finals of UEFA Euro 1996 at Wembley Stadium on 22 June 1996, in a fixture preceded by heightened media rhetoric in the British press. Ahead of the match, several English tabloid newspapers framed the tie in nationalistic and historical terms—drawing parallels with the Spanish Armada and ongoing European Union fishing disputes—and published provocative headlines targeting Spain. While England manager Terry Venables and Spain coach Javier Clemente publicly played down the off-field coverage, the buildup gave the encounter an unusually tense atmosphere. On the pitch, Spain controlled long stretches of possession and created the clearer scoring opportunities, but the match remained goalless after 90 minutes and extra time. Spain had two goals disallowed for offside—including a controversial decision against Julio Salinas in the first half—and were also denied a penalty appeal when Alfonso Pérez Muñoz went down in the area under a challenge from Paul Gascoigne. With the score at 0–0, the tie was decided by a penalty shoot-out. England converted all four of their spot-kicks through Alan Shearer, David Platt, Stuart Pearce, and Gascoigne, while Fernando Hierro struck the crossbar and Miguel Ángel Nadal had his effort saved by David Seaman, giving England a 4–2 shoot-out victory and their first knockout win at a major tournament on penalty kicks. In Spain, the defeat was widely attributed to officiating decisions by French referee Marc Batta, reinforcing a long-standing domestic narrative of tournament misfortune at the quarter-final stage.

== The 2004 Madrid friendly and racism controversy ==
Following a 3–0 friendly victory for England at Villa Park in February 2001—notable as Sven-Göran Eriksson's first match in charge of England—the two sides met again in a high-profile friendly at the Santiago Bernabéu on 17 November 2004. While Spain won 1–0 through a first-half goal by Asier del Horno (and Raúl had a penalty saved by Paul Robinson), the match was overshadowed by widespread racist abuse directed from sections of the home crowd toward several black England players, including Ashley Cole, Shaun Wright-Phillips, Rio Ferdinand, Jermaine Jenas, and Jermain Defoe. Similar incidents had also occurred the previous evening during an under-21 match between the two nations in Alcalá de Henares. The match took place against a backdrop of diplomatic and media tension. Just weeks earlier, Spain manager Luis Aragonés had drawn sharp criticism in the British press after television cameras recorded him attempting to motivate forward José Antonio Reyes during a training session by referring to Reyes's Arsenal teammate Thierry Henry in racially derogatory terms. Aragonés maintained that his remarks were colloquial motivational rhetoric taken out of context and denied any racist intent, though he was later fined €3,000 by the Royal Spanish Football Federation (RFEF) and issued a public apology to Henry. Furthermore, the fixture coincided with the campaign for the 2012 Summer Olympics, for which Madrid and London were rival candidate cities; British media and politicians linked the stadium incidents to Madrid's candidacy, prompting Madrid mayor Alberto Ruiz-Gallardón to condemn the chants while arguing they did not reflect the city's broader character. In response to the events at the Bernabéu, FIFA fined the RFEF 100,000 Swiss francs (£44,750) and warned of potential stadium closures. The Football Association (FA) subsequently refused to play future fixtures at the Santiago Bernabéu—notably vetoing the venue when a friendly in Spain was scheduled in February 2009, which was moved to Seville's Ramón Sánchez Pizjuán Stadium instead. England did not play in Madrid again for 22 years, returning to the Spanish capital only in November 2026 for a UEFA Nations League match held at Atlético Madrid's Metropolitano Stadium.

== Friendly era and the 2018–2019 UEFA Nations League ==
Between 2007 and 2016, the two nations met solely in five international friendlies during a period marked by Spain's golden generation, which won consecutive major tournaments (UEFA Euro 2008, the 2010 FIFA World Cup, and UEFA Euro 2012). Spain won 1–0 at Old Trafford in February 2007 and 2–0 in Seville in February 2009, before England defeated the reigning world and European champions 1–0 at Wembley in November 2011 via a Frank Lampard header. Spain recorded a 2–0 win in Alicante in November 2015, while a November 2016 friendly at Wembley ended 2–2 after Spain scored twice in the final minutes through Iago Aspas and Isco. Competitive fixtures resumed in the inaugural 2018–19 UEFA Nations League, where the teams were drawn into League A, Group 4. On 8 September 2018 at Wembley—marking Luis Enrique's debut as Spain manager—England took an early lead through Marcus Rashford, but first-half goals from Saúl Ñíguez and Rodrigo gave Spain a 2–1 victory, ending England's 24-match unbeaten run in competitive home fixtures. In the return match at Seville's Estadio Benito Villamarín on 15 October 2018, England raced to a 3–0 half-time lead via a Raheem Sterling brace and a goal from Rashford, holding on for a 3–2 win despite second-half replies from Paco Alcácer and Sergio Ramos. The result was England's first away victory over Spain in 31 years and ended Spain's 38-match unbeaten home run in competitive fixtures.

== UEFA Euro 2024 final and recent Nations League meetings (2024–present) ==
After nearly six years without meeting, England and Spain faced each other in the UEFA Euro 2024 final on 14 July 2024 at the Olympiastadion in Berlin—their first major tournament final against one another. Following a goalless first half, Nico Williams put Spain ahead two minutes after the restart from a Lamine Yamal assist. Substitute Cole Palmer equalised for England in the 73rd minute, before Mikel Oyarzabal scored an 86th-minute winner to secure a 2–1 victory and a record fourth European Championship title for Spain, while condemning England to consecutive European Championship final defeats. The two sides were drawn together again in League A, Group 3 of the 2026–27 UEFA Nations League, meeting twice as the reigning world champions (Spain) and European champions faced off in high-scoring contests: • 26 September 2026 (Wembley Stadium, London): Spain defeated England 3–2 in the group opener. Lamine Yamal scored twice alongside a goal from Oyarzabal, while Anthony Gordon and Harry Kane netted for England. • 15 November 2026 (Metropolitano Stadium, Madrid): In the decisive final group match—England's first appearance in Madrid since 2004—England built a 3–0 lead through a Harry Kane penalty and goals from Ezri Konsa and Ben White. Following a 63rd-minute red card to Elliot Anderson, Spain pulled two goals back through an Oyarzabal penalty and Nico Williams, but Thomas Tuchel's side held on to win 3–2, ending Spain's 22-match unbeaten run in Madrid dating back to 1987 and topping the group.

== Full internationals ==
=== Overview ===
Type	Matches	(England)	Draw	(Spain)
FIFA World Cup	2	0	1	1
UEFA European Championship*	5	3	1	1
UEFA Nations League	4	2	0	2
All competitive	14	4	6	4
Friendly	21	10	2	9
Total	35	14	8	13

* Euro matchups include qualifiers. Penalty shoot-outs are recorded as draws, in which England defeated Spain 4–2 in 1990 and 6–5 in 1996.

Venue	(England)	Draw	(Spain)
Matches in England	6	6	3
London	6	2	3
Birmingham	1	0	0
(Greater Manchester) Manchester	0	0	1
Neutral matches	2	3	2
Matches in Spain	7	2	4
(Community of Madrid) Madrid	5	2	2
(Andalusia) Seville	1	0	1
(Valencian Community) Alicant	0	0	1
(Catalonia) Barcelona	1	0	0
(Cantabria) Santander	0	0	1

=== List of matches ===
No	Date	Venue	Competition	Result			Head to Head
1	15 May 1929	(Spain) Madrid	Friendly Match	Spain	4–3	England	Spain 1
2	9 December 1931	(England) London	Friendly Match	England	7–1	Spain	England 1
3	2 July 1950	(Brazil) Rio de Janeiro	1950 FIFA World Cup	Spain	1–0	England	Spain 2
4	18 May 1955	(Spain) Madrid	Friendly Match	Spain	1–1	England	–
5	30 November 1955	(England) London	Friendly Match	England	4–1	Spain	England 2
6	15 May 1960	(Spain) Madrid	Friendly Match	Spain	3–0	England	Spain 3
7	26 October 1960	(England) London	Friendly Match	England	4–2	Spain	England 3
8	8 December 1965	(Spain) Madrid	Friendly Match	Spain	0–2	England	England 4
9	24 May 1967	(England) London	Friendly Match	England	2–0	Spain	England 5
10	3 April 1968	(England) London	UEFA Euro 1968	England	1–0	Spain	England 6
11	8 May 1968	(Spain) Madrid	UEFA Euro 1968	Spain	1–2	England	England 7
12	26 March 1980	(Spain) Barcelona	Friendly Match	Spain	0–2	England	England 8
13	18 June 1980	(Italy) Naples	UEFA Euro 1980	Spain	1–2	England	England 9
14	25 March 1981	(England) London	Friendly Match	England	1–2	Spain	England 9
15	5 July 1982	(Spain) Madrid	1982 FIFA World Cup	Spain	0–0	England	–
16	18 February 1987	(Spain) Madrid	Friendly Match	Spain	2–4	England	England 10
17	9 September 1992	(Spain) Santander	Friendly Match	Spain	1–0	England	Spain 4
18	22 June 1996	(England) London	UEFA Euro 1996	England	0–0 (4–2 pen.)	Spain	–
19	28 February 2001	(England) Birmingham	Friendly Match	England	3–0	Spain	England 11
20	17 November 2004	(Spain) Madrid	Friendly Match	Spain	1–0	England	Spain 5
21	7 February 2007	(England) Manchester	Friendly Match	England	0–1	Spain	Spain 6
22	11 February 2009	(Spain) Seville	Friendly Match	Spain	2–0	England	Spain 7
23	12 November 2011	(England) London	Friendly Match	England	1–0	Spain	England 12
24	13 November 2015	(Spain) Alicante	Friendly Match	Spain	2–0	England	Spain 8
25	15 November 2016	(England) London	Friendly Match	England	2–2	Spain	–
26	8 September 2018	(England) London	2018–19 UEFA Nations League	England	1–2	Spain	Spain 9
27	15 October 2018	(Spain) Seville	2018–19 UEFA Nations League	Spain	2–3	England	England 13
28	14 July 2024	(Germany) Berlin	UEFA Euro 2024	Spain	2–1	England	Spain 10
29	26 September 2026	(England) London	2026–27 UEFA Nations League	England	2–3	Spain	Spain 11
30	15 November 2026	(Spain) Madrid	2026–27 UEFA Nations League	Spain	2–3	England	Spain 12

== Women's football rivalry ==
England–Spain football rivalry
- Location: Europe (UEFA)
- Teams: England; Spain
- First meeting: 19 December 1993; UEFA Women's Euro 1995 qualifying England 0–0 Spain
- Latest meeting: 5 June 2026; 2027 FIFA Women's World Cup qualification Spain 4–0 England

Statistics
- Total meetings: 22
- Most wins: England (9)
- Top scorer: Alexia Putellas (4)
- Largest victory: Spain 4–0 England (5 June 2026)
- Largest goal scoring: England 4–2 Spain (22 March 2001)

=== Early meetings and UEFA Women's Euro 2013 (1993–2013) ===
The senior women's national teams of England and Spain first met on 19 December 1993 in a friendly in Pamplona, which ended in a 0–0 draw. During the late 1990s and 2000s, the fixture consisted primarily of European Championship qualifying ties, play-offs, and occasional friendlies. Spain eliminated England in a two-legged play-off in September 1996 (winning 2–1 in Montilla with two goals from Mar Prieto and drawing 1–1 in Birkenhead) to qualify for UEFA Women's Euro 1997, whereas England recorded several victories over Spain during the 2000s, including qualifiers for UEFA Women's Euro 2009. The two teams met for the first time in a major tournament final group stage at UEFA Women's Euro 2013 in Sweden. In their opening Group C fixture in Linköping on 12 July 2013, Spain defeated England 3–2 in a dramatic match. After Verónica Boquete and Jennifer Hermoso twice put Spain ahead and Eniola Aluko and Laura Bassett equalised for England, 19-year-old Alexia Putellas scored a stoppage-time header—her first international goal for the senior national team—to secure Spain's victory and help propel them to the quarter-finals.

=== Rise to prominence and the 2023 World Cup final (2017–2023) ===
Over the following decade, as Spain rapidly emerged as a global force in women's football alongside an established England side, the rivalry intensified in knockout fixtures. England won 2–0 in the group stage of UEFA Women's Euro 2017 in Breda and claimed a 3–1 victory in the 2020 SheBelieves Cup, before a 0–0 draw in the inaugural Arnold Clark Cup in February 2022. Five months later, hosts England defeated Spain 2–1 after extra time in the quarter-finals of UEFA Women's Euro 2022 in Brighton—coming from behind after Esther González had given Spain the lead, via goals from Ella Toone and Georgia Stanway—on their way to winning the tournament. The two nations contested their biggest-ever match in the 2023 FIFA Women's World Cup final on 20 August 2023 at Stadium Australia in Sydney, with both teams appearing in their first Women's World Cup final. Captain Olga Carmona scored the decisive goal in the 29th minute as Spain won 1–0 to claim their first world title, despite England goalkeeper Mary Earps saving a second-half penalty from Hermoso.

=== Euro 2025 final and recent meetings (2025–present) ===
Following the 2023 World Cup final, England and Spain met repeatedly across European competitions between 2025 and 2026:

==== 2025 UEFA Women's Nations League ====
Drawn together in this League A, Group 3, England won 1–0 at Wembley in February 2025 via a Jess Park goal, before Spain won 2–1 in Barcelona in June 2025 through a second-half brace by Clàudia Pina to top the group. The two sides met in a second consecutive major tournament final on 27 July 2025 at St. Jakob-Park in Basel. After a 1–1 draw following extra time, England prevailed 3–1 in the penalty shoot-out to retain their European crown.

==== 2027 FIFA Women's World Cup ====
Paired again in 2027 FIFA Women's World Cup qualification – UEFA League A in 2026, England earned a 1–0 win at Wembley on 14 April 2026 through an early Lauren Hemp goal, before Spain recorded their largest-ever victory in the fixture with a 4–0 win in Palma de Mallorca on 5 June 2026, featuring two goals from Alexia Putellas alongside strikes from Patri Guijarro and Clàudia Pina.

==== Matches ====
No	Date	Venue	Competition	Result			Head to Head
1	19 December 1993	(Spain) Osuna	1995 UEFA Women's Championship qualification	Spain	0–0	England	–
2	20 February 1994	(England) Bradford	1995 UEFA Women's Championship qualification	England	0–0	Spain	–
3	8 September 1996	(Spain) Montilla	1997 UEFA Women's Championship qualification	Spain	2–1	England	Spain 1
4	29 September 1996	(England) Birkenhead	1997 UEFA Women's Championship qualification	England	1–1	Spain	–
5	22 March 2001	(England) Luton	Friendly Match	England	4–2	Spain	England 1
6	25 November 2007	(England) Shrewsbury	2009 UEFA Women's Championship qualification	England	1–0	Spain	England 2
7	2 October 2008	(Spain) Zamora	2009 UEFA Women's Championship qualification	Spain	2–2	England	–
8	1 April 2010	(England) London	2011 FIFA Women's World Cup qualification	England	1–0	Spain	England 3
9	19 June 2010	(Spain) Aranda de Duero	2011 FIFA Women's World Cup qualification	Spain	2–2	England	–
10	12 July 2013	(Sweden) Linköping	UEFA Women's Euro 2013	England	2–3	Spain	Spain 2
11	25 October 2016	(Spain) Guadalajara	Friendly Match	Spain	1–2	England	England 4
12	23 July 2017	(Netherlands) Breda	UEFA Women's Euro 2017	England	2–0	Spain	England 5
13	9 April 2019	(England) Swindon	Friendly Match	England	2–1	Spain	England 6
14	11 March 2020	(United States) Frisco	Friendly Match	England	0–1	Spain	Spain 3
15	20 February 2022	(England) Norwich	Friendly Match	England	0–0	Spain	–
16	20 July 2022	(England) Brighton	UEFA Women's Euro 2022	England	2–1	Spain	England 7
17	20 August 2023	(Australia) Sydney	2023 FIFA Women's World Cup	Spain	1–0	England	Spain 4
18	26 February 2025	(England) London	2025 UEFA Women's Nations League	England	1–0	Spain	England 8
19	3 June 2025	(Spain) Barcelona	2025 UEFA Women's Nations League	Spain	2–1	England	Spain 5
20	27 July 2025	(Switzerland) Basel	UEFA Women's Euro 2025	England	1–1 (3–1 pen.)	Spain	–
21	14 April 2026	(England) London	2027 FIFA Women's World Cup qualification	England	1–0	Spain	England 9
22	5 June 2026	(Spain) Palma de Mallorca	2027 FIFA Women's World Cup qualification	Spain	4–0	England	Spain 6

== Goalscorers ==
=== Men ===
#	Payer	Goals
1	(England) Gary Lineker	4
2	(Spain) Mikel Oyarzabal	3
3	(England) Joe Carter	2
3	(Spain) Gaspar Rubio	2
3	(England) Jack Smith	2
3	(England) Tommy Johnson	2
3	(England) Sammy Crooks	2
3	(England) Bill Perry	2
3	(Spain) Eulogio Martínez	2
3	(England) Bobby Smith	2
3	(England) Jimmy Greaves	2
3	(England) Roger Hunt	2
3	(England) Tony Woodcock	2
3	(England) Marcus Rashford	2
3	(England) Raheem Sterling	2
3	(England) Harry Kane	2
3	(Spain) Nico Williams	2

=== Women ===
#	Player	Goals
1	(Spain) Alexia Putellas	4
2	(England) Sue Smith	3
2	(Spain) Clàudia Pina	3
4	(Spain) Mar Prieto	2
4	(England) Karen Carney	2
4	(England) Kelly Smith	2
4	(Spain) Sonia Bermúdez	2
4	(Spain) Verónica Boquete	2
4	(England) Alessia Russo	2

== See also ==
- English football club rivalries
- Perfidious Albion
