= World Day for Farmed Animals =

International campaign by animal rights activists

World Day for Farmed Animals (WDFA) is an international campaign to mourn and memorialize the 83 billion land animals and uncounted trillions of sea animals killed for food each year. Its observance held annually on October 2, coincides with the birthday of Mahatma Gandhi, an advocate of nonviolence toward animals. WDFA seeks to raise public awareness of industrial animal agriculture and to advocate for more sustainable food systems. That date is also observed throughout the world as International Day of Non-Violence.

== History ==
The observance was founded in 1983 by Alex Hershaft, a Holocaust survivor and advocate for animal rights, through the not-for-profit Washington, DC-based organization Farm Animal Rights Movement. Originally launched as World Farm Animals Day, the campaign was established to memorialize and mourn the millions of animals bred for animal slaughter, and to draw attention to the living conditions of animals in factory farms and other intensive agricultural systems toward ending the use of animals for food. Initially centered on grassroots activism in the United States, the observance gradually expanded in scope and gained international coverage. It has since been associated with various forms of public engagement, such as educational programs and symbolic activities, including government proclamations, aimed at raising awareness toward ending the use of animals for food entirely.

== Observance ==
WDFA's activities take place at local, national, and international levels and are coordinated by grassroots organizations, animal sanctuaries, and animal advocacy groups. Common forms of observance include candlelight vigils, public demonstrations, educational presentations, advertising campaigns, and outreach events held in schools, community centers, and places of worship.

A prominent component of the day is the Fast Against Slaughter, a campaign that invites participants to Hunger strike for 24 hours as a gesture in solidarity with farmed animals. The fast is often accompanied by silent protests, online testimonials, and social media campaigns.

In various countries, including India, the United Kingdom, South Africa, Mexico, and Australia, WDFA events have included street theater, visual installations, and exhibits simulating conditions in industrial farming systems.

== Purpose ==
The purpose of the annual worldwide observance is to call public attention to the needless suffering and death inflicted each year on 83 billion land animals and a couple trillion sea animals, as well as to the severe adverse impact of consuming animal flesh and other animal products on consumer health and the global environment. The organizers believe that the only effective solution to these critical problems is to end the use of animals for food.

== Activities and demands ==
On September 30, 2013, as part of World Day for Farmed Animals, activists from Toronto Pig Save and the Farm Animal Rights Movement (FARM) organized a protest at Quality Meat Packers in Toronto. The demonstration included a human chain, a “die-in,” and video screenings to raise awareness about conditions in slaughterhouses. Photographs by Jo-Anne McArthur were displayed to highlight the experiences of farmed animals. Similar protests occurred across over 100 locations in North America and internationally.

At the Washington headquarters of the US Department of Agriculture, animal activists organized picketing, blocking of the main entrance, and a sit-in in the office of the Secretary of Agriculture. Slaughterhouses in Virginia, Maryland, California, and Toronto have witnessed overnight vigils by animal activists and attempts to stop animal transport trucks from entering.

On September 29, 2013, local animal rights activists organized a protest at the U.S. Department of Agriculture headquarters in Washington, D.C. The demonstration was part of WDFA, involving coordinated actions at slaughterhouses and animal agriculture facilities to raise awareness about the treatment of farmed animals.

Beginning in 1983, proclamations have been obtained from over two dozen governors and mayors, including New York City, declaring October 2nd as World Day for Farmed Animals within their respective jurisdictions.

== See also ==
- World Vegan Day
- World Day for the End of Speciesism
- Veganism
