= Douglass Beach Site =

Archaeological site off southern Florida

Coordinates: 27.4174°N 80.2658°W

The Douglass Beach Site is a marine inundated archaeological site on the eastern side of southern Florida. The site has two components; a cultural formation and a natural formation. The cultural formation aspect of the site is an 18th-century Spanish shipwreck, created when the 1715 century Spanish Plate Fleet ran aground near shore. Famed for their transport of gold and silver from the New World to Spain, the Spanish Plate Fleet site has been a destination for salvagers since the early 1960s. An archaic terrestrial site lies under the remains of the Spanish Plate Fleet and makes up the site's natural formation. Fossils of megafauna from the Pleistocene era have been uncovered here as well as some Native American artifacts. The terrestrial site's formation is believed to have been caused by years of sediment deposition and the slow accumulation of faunal remains caused by barrier island formation. The duality of this site makes it unique and an area of intrigue for archaeologists interested in exploring the factors influencing marine-inundated site preservation and the processes responsible marine-site formation.

== Geography ==
Douglass beach is located off the east coast of Southern Florida, directly offshore from a barrier island, Hutchinson Island. The site is in a region of notably high wave action and relatively shallow depth, the site never exceeding more than 6 meters in depth. It was previously thought that marine sites would only survive in areas of low wave action; upon the discovery of Douglass Beach, this previous assumption was abandoned. Archaeologists presume a rapid and high sea level rise and the presence of a barrier island are responsible for the well-preserved artifacts and stratigraphy of the site.

=== Stratigraphy ===
Sites of intense wave action will often have a signature stratum of high specific gravity, size, and weight where the wave base used to be. In looking at the stratigraphy of the site and comparing it to where Spanish coins and heavier objects were found in the strata, archaeologists concluded that the wave base of the site must have moved with enough speed so as not to disturbed the fine, clay layer of the archaic terrestrial site. The fine-grained strata of the terrestrial site would have dispersed had it been exposed to large amounts of wave action, but it is instead remarkably preserved with strata above it showing signs of wave action. Using this stratigraphic data, archaeologists hypothesized that the site's wave base was deep enough to "intersect back barrier sediments since 1715" (53, Murphy). Placement of the coins, relatively dense objects, in relation to the clay sediment of the terrestrial site indicate that wave action was never shallow enough to successfully disrupt the terrestrial site.

== History ==
=== Terrestrial site ===
According to the strata and the faunal and botanical remains identified at the site, as well as information about how far sea level rose in the Pleistocene, it is believed that the Douglass beach site was once a highlands site predating the global sea level rise towards the end of the Pleistocene. Faunal remains of Pleistocene horses, deer, and gophers contribute to the belief that at one point the site was grassy and well above sea level. Evidence of human activity has also been found in periods when the site was a Highland; pottery shards, as well as human remains, date the site to about 4,800 B.P. Projectiles, shell tools and sand pottery have also been uncovered, which serves as evidence that the people occupying the site had coastal access at one point. As sea level rose, the land became increasingly flooded producing a wetland type habitat. Intact pollen granules recovered from the site show strong evidence of the presence of wetland plants and salt tolerant plants common in brackish, marshy environments. Faunal remains of both terrestrial and aquatic origin found at the site further the belief that the site was once a wetland predating its marine induction. Signs of salt-tolerant aquatic life such as tiger sharks, giant groupers, and both freshwater and sea turtles, in particular, serve as evidence for the presence of wide-scale sea level rise in the site's past, causing the marsh to become increasingly salty over time.

==== Formation ====
As sea level rose, it affected the surrounding landscapes by flooding them and turning them into marshy environments, signs of human habitation are also present during this time period. As the sea level rose and the barrier island retreated, it began covering the site in a layer of sand, thereby protecting it from wave action as sea level rose until the wave base could no longer disturb the terrestrial site

=== Spanish Plate Fleet ===
Beginning in the 16th century, the Spanish Plate Fleet was a trade network of ships that brought items of gold, silver and textiles from the New World to Spain. In the summer of 1715, an offshore hurricane resulted in the wreck of 11 of the fleet's ships. The ships all ran aground near the shallow reefs close to shore, wave action then let to the ship's destruction and the dispersion of the Spanish artifacts. The Spaniards tried recovering as many items as possible but the storm had scattered the ships' contents far and wide, leaving many artifacts yet to be discovered.

=== Discovery ===
The Spanish Plate Fleet site was rediscovered in the 1960s upon the discovery of Spanish coins present on the beach. Its location was first determined by Kip Wagner in the 1940s, who successfully pinpointed the site's location using a copy of an ancient, Roman map of trade routes and shipwrecks from the 1700s. Combined with the ancient Mexican pottery and Asian porcelain found by Charles Higgs in his surface surveying expedition in the 1940s, Wagner was able to narrowly search a specific region until he came across the remains of an identifiable ship wreck. Seeking approval from the state of Florida in 1960, he set out with a crew of commercial salvagers to explore remains found at the site.

In 1964 the site of Douglass beach is officially located and the state of Florida hires Carl Clausen as the site's first resident underwater archaeologist.

in 1972 W.A. Cockrell becomes the state underwater archaeologist and resumes research diving at Douglass beach and another site known as Warm Mineral Springs. In 1976, archaeologists accompany salvors with the sole purpose of uncovering archaeological artifacts and faunal remains.

Despite the site's clear archaeological value, the State of Florida could not prohibit salvaging of the site due to a law passed in 1958 known as the Florida salvage law. Instead, the state reached an agreement and gave sole salvaging rights to a company that agreed to always have an archaeologist onboard overseeing their exploration of the site.

In the late 1900s, Larry E. Murphy was assigned to the site and was the first archaeologist to confirm the presence of a terrestrial archaic site located below the existing shipwreck.

== Significance ==
The Douglass Beach site has fundamentally changed archaeologists' perceptions of how marine sites are formed, where they are formed, and how wave action affects sites. Prior to the discovery of the Douglass Beach site, salvaging was popularized and mandated due to the common belief that the ocean was constantly decomposing artifacts and sites, as long as they remained underwater. This led to a rapid salvaging of all known shipwrecks since it was believed anything remaining at the site would be ultimately destroyed. Upon the discovery of the well preserved archaic remains found at Douglass Beach, this theory was later disproved, but not before salvaging had ruined many of the sites stratigraphic layers.

Prior to the Douglass Beach site's terrestrial component discovery, it was believed that terrestrial archaeological sites would only be found in low wave action regions due to the same principal belief that the constant wave action would destroy any artifacts after a short period of time. However, after the establishment of the Douglass Beach site, this belief was modified to include regions near barrier islands and regions with sediments of high specific gravity. Through analysis of the strata at Douglass Beach, formation components of marine inundated sites were established which can now set a precedent for the uncovering of more terrestrial sites in new regions.
