= R/IAmA =

Reddit forum for question-and-answer interactive interviews

r/IAmA
- Subreddit logo
- Website type: Subreddit
- Available in: English
- Website: r/IAmA
- Users: 22.5 million members
- Launched: May 27, 2009; 17 years ago

r/IAmA is a subreddit for question-and-answer interactive interviews termed "AMA" (short for "Ask Me Anything"). AMA interviewees have ranged from various celebrities to everyday people in several lines of work. Founded in May 2009, the subreddit has gone on to become one of Reddit's most popular communities.

== Concept ==
"IAmA" stands for "I am a _____, Ask Me Anything". The subreddit is based on posting "AMAs" (for "Ask Me Anything"), or similarly "AMAAs" (Ask Me Almost/Absolutely Anything) – prompts for others to ask questions about any topic. AMAs are open to all Reddit users, but interviewees require proof that they are who/what they claim to be. They use the site's comment system for both questions and answers; this process has been compared to an online press conference. Like the rest of Reddit, users can also upvote and downvote potential candidates, with the most favoured being more likely to receive an answer.

=== History ===
According to The Atlantic, this concept is new to the digital age. They deemed the closest equivalents to be game shows and radio call-in shows, which placed a heavy focus on the interviewees. Contrastingly, r/IAmA places more emphasis on users answering the questions.

The concept's genesis on the internet began in the 1990s; Slashdot launched similar interviews in 1999, but only 10 questions per person were allowed. Participants included free software advocate Bruce Perens and Linux developer Alan Cox. This was followed by Something Awful's Ask/Tell forums, which was more focused on interviews with everyday people.

Reddit built on this idea with video interviews with site staff Alexis Ohanian and Erik Martin. The following demand for AMAs led to the creation of the current r/IAmA subreddit in May 2009. Unlike its precursors, it requires proof of identity. Since its founding, similar features have appeared in other social media sites, like Tumblr and Ask.fm.

== Participants ==
Filmmaker M. Night Shyamalan doing a Reddit AMA to promote Servant in 2021

Initially, AMAs focused more on ordinary citizens; these interviews still make up some of the subreddit's content today. As Reddit expanded, its staff attempted to bring in celebrity guests—early examples include businesswoman Caterina Fake. Since then, a number of individuals have been interviewed in the IAmA subreddit, some of whom have appeared multiple times. Notable participants include then-United States President Barack Obama (while campaigning for the 2012 election), Bill Gates (multiple times), Bernie Sanders (amidst the 2018 midterm elections), and Holocaust survivor Alex Hershaft. Other people, including Donald Trump, have conducted AMAs in a similar fashion on other parts of Reddit.

The increased traffic for Obama's AMA brought down many parts of the website when it occurred on August 29, 2012.

Celebrities participating in AMAs have seen both positive and negative responses. In 2012, Woody Harrelson's AMA was criticized after Harrelson declined to answer questions that were unrelated to the movie he was then promoting, apparently unaware of the AMA's purpose. By contrast, rapper Snoop Dogg's 2012 AMA attracted 1.6 million page views after he provided several candid responses to the community's questions.

== Controversies ==
From 2013 to 2015, Victoria Taylor assisted Reddit's volunteer community in presenting interviews. She primarily transcribed spoken celebrity responses, but also helped organize timing, affirmed best practices, and assisted in preparation. On July 2, 2015, hundreds of subreddits, including several with over a million subscribers, were set to private by their respective volunteer moderators after Taylor was dismissed. These moderators stated that a primary factor for the shutdown was a lack of warning for Reddit's decision; Reddit provided no immediate replacement for Taylor's services. Sources closer to Reddit users cited an increased focus on commercializing AMAs as the most likely reason.
