= Benjamin White =

Benjamin White or Ben White may refer to:

- Benjamin White (Maine politician) (1790–1860), U.S. representative from Maine
- Benjamin White (publisher) (c. 1725–1794), publisher
- Benjamin White (field hockey), Australian field hockey player
- Benjamin F. White (Montana politician) (1833–1920), 10th Territorial Governor of Montana
- Benjamin Franklin White (1800–1879), "shape note" singer
- Ben White (artist) (born 1977), British artist
- Ben White (cricketer) (born 1998), Irish cricketer
- Ben White (environmentalist) (1951–2005), arborist, environmentalist and Native American rights activist
- Ben White (finance journalist) (1972–2024), American journalist
- Ben White (footballer) (born 1997), English footballer
- Ben White (harness racing) (1873–1958), Canadian-born harness racing driver and trainer
- Ben White (rugby league) (born 1994), English rugby league footballer
- Ben White (rugby union, born 1983), Australian rugby union player
- Ben White (rugby union, born 1998), Scottish rugby union scrum-half
- Ben Chester White (1899–1966), black caretaker, uninvolved in the civil rights movement, shot down by the KKK
