= Jon Camp (American guitarist) =

- Born: May 19, 1976 (age 49); Antioch, Illinois, US
- Genres: Fingerstyle guitar; American primitive guitar; Drone music; Folk music; psychedelia
- Instrument: Electric guitar
- Years active: 2014–present
- Label: Centripetal Force
- Website: https://joncamp.bandcamp.com

Jon Camp is an American guitarist and animal rights advocate from Antioch, Illinois. He has released five studio albums and was inducted into the Animal Rights Hall of Fame in 2014.

== Animal rights advocacy ==
Jon adopted a vegetarian diet (and subsequently a vegan diet) in 1995 after taking an ethics course at the College of Lake County in Grayslake, Illinois. In a New York Times opinion piece, he suggested "eating vegetarian isn't about being perfect or pure, but about reducing suffering."

He notably distributed over a million pro-vegetarian booklets across over 500 schools throughout North America during his tenure with Vegan Outreach.

He was featured in the documentary Speciesism: The Movie in 2013.

== Music career ==
After surviving a severe case of Lyme disease in 2012, Jon incorporated playing and writing music into his daily routine. He released his first studio EP, Earwig, via Gotta Groove Records in 2014. Brandon Soderberg of the Baltimore Sun opined about the album, "Camp’s brief but fully formed compositions have a time-traveling effect on the listener. It becomes hard to tell if you’ve been listening for a few minutes or a few hours, so confidently and strangely do these songs inhabit their own world...".

In 2016, he released his full-length follow up, Stifled Hair-Trigger, via Gotta Groove Records. Kati Schardl of the Tallahassee Democrat described it as "a feast for the ears." Joseph Neff of The Vinyl District gave it a "B" rating, distinguishing the fifth track, "Christian, This World Is Yours", as a "standout".

In 2019, he released Headwinds & Tailwinds. Joseph Neff of The Vinyl District gave it an "A-" rating, stating "his follow-up offers a marked improvement to my ear ... altogether a fine turn of events." The title track was featured on the 47th episode of Brokedown Podcast along with an interview in June 2019.

In 2022, he released his self-titled album, Jon Camp, his first album on Centripetal Force. Rick Taylor of We Fought the Big One described it as "a remarkable collection of instrumental pieces that evoke feelings of wonder, longing and nostalgia for calmer, simpler times". Andy French of Raven Sings the Blues stated of the album, “From fingerpicked folk to broken dawn blues, glycerine contemplation, bluegrass breezes and non-trad tributaries, the album doesn’t settle. With so many muses, Jon keeps things from swerving between impulses, finding a common beam between the hues in his wheel of colors.”

In 2025, he released Proceed, his second album on Centripetal Force. Jeff Conklin of Ambient Audiophile stated the album "sees Jon joined by a large cast of musical supporters, bringing exuberant life to Camp’s wonderfully rambling compositions for fingerstyle guitar." Proceed was included in Aquarium Drunkard's 2025 Year in Review, noting "Camp's songs carry a palpable wistfulness ... Proceed has an intimacy and immediacy that deepen with each listen." Production of the album was partially funded by a Maryland State Arts Council grant.

His playing style has been described as "blending drone, twang, and melody into a coherent whole that is exploratory without forsaking the hook" and "with a reverence for tradition, while also demonstrating a style that pushes forward the sounds of American folk music."

== Discography ==
Studio albums

- Earwig (EP, 2014, Gotta Groove Records)
- Stifled Hair-Trigger (LP, 2016)
- Headwinds & Tailwinds (LP, 2019)
- Jon Camp (LP, 2022, Centripetal Force)
- Proceed (LP, 2025, Centripetal Force)
