= Jack Norris (activist) =

American activist

- Born: February 2, 1967 (age 59); Ohio, United States
- Education: Cornell College (BA, 1988); Life University (BSc, 2000)
- Occupations: Activist; author; dietitian
- Years active: 1993–present
- Spouse: Alexandra Bury (m. 2008–2023)
- Website: jacknorrisrd.com

Jack Norris (born February 2, 1967) is an American dietitian and animal rights activist who specializes in plant-based nutrition. He is Executive Director of Vegan Outreach, which he co-founded in 1993.

== Early life and education ==
Norris graduated from Archbishop Moeller High School in Cincinnati, Ohio in 1985. He attended Cornell College in Mount Vernon, Iowa, receiving a B.S.S. in Philosophy and Sociology in 1989.

He earned a Bachelor of Science degree in Nutrition and Dietetics from Life University (Marietta, Georgia) in 2000 and performed his dietetic internship at Georgia State University in 2000–2001.

== Career ==
Norris, a vegan, is a registered dietitian.

Norris is the author of Vitamin B12: Are You Getting It?., Nutrition Tips for Vegans., and many other articles on VeganHealth.org. He's the author of Going Vegan Reduces Your Environmental Impact..

Norris pioneered Vegan Outreach's Adopt A College program, which was most prolific from 2005 to 2020, and consists of vegan advocates handing out Vegan Outreach's booklets to over 22 million students at over 4,800 schools. Norris now oversees Vegan Outreach's online 10 Weeks to Vegan program, in which over 1 million people have taken part. The program has different versions for 19 countries.

=== Honors and awards ===
Norris won VegNews magazine's Columnist of the Year award for 2003 and 2004.

In 2005, Norris was elected to the Animal Rights Hall of Fame.

== Personal life ==
Norris married vegan chef Alex Bury on September 11, 2008, in front of a KFC restaurant in Toronto, Canada. After the wedding, the guests were served vegan sandwiches that KFC had recently introduced to the public. Norris and Bury divorced in 2023. Norris lives in St. Petersburg, Florida.

== Publications ==
- Norris, Jack. Vitamin B12: Are You Getting It? (web-based book). VeganHealth.org.
- Norris, Jack; Messina, Virginia (2020-05-12). Vegan for Life: Everything You Need to Know to Be Healthy and Fit on a Plant-Based Diet. Second Edition. Hachette Go. ISBN 978-0738285863.

== See also ==
- Animal protectionism
- Vegan nutrition
- List of animal rights advocates
