= Brent Brisben =

American treasure hunter

Brent W. Brisben (born March 20, 1968) is an American treasure hunter best known for salvaging the shipwrecks of the historic 1715 Treasure Fleet, a Spanish treasure fleet returning from the New World to Spain. During the early morning hours of July 31, 1715, seven days after departing from Havana, Cuba, eleven of the twelve ships of this fleet were lost in a hurricane near present-day Vero Beach, Florida. Because the fleet was carrying silver, it is also known as the 1715 Plate Fleet (plata being the Spanish word for silver plate). Some artifacts and even coins still wash up on Florida beaches from time to time.

== Personal life ==
Brent Brisben was born and raised in Montgomery, Ohio, a suburb of Cincinnati. He graduated from Archbishop Moeller High School in 1986 and was a member of Moeller's 1985 state championship football team. After high school, Brisben attended the University of Cincinnati where he studied communications. Brisben worked as a sports producer at WCPO-TV in Cincinnati and later worked for his father's real estate development company.

== Biography ==
Brisben and his father William O. Brisben founded 1715 Fleet - Queens Jewels, LLC in 2010. The Brisbens purchased the exclusive salvage rights to the 1715 Treasure Fleet from the heirs of world-famous treasure hunter Mel Fisher. Just 17 days after the purchase, a subcontractor to 1715 - QJ recovered the only bronze swivel gun ever found on the 1715 Fleet. Hidden inside the bronze cannon were 51 gold escudos and 40 silver reales. Within a month of the cannon find, a mother/daughter team of subcontractors of Brisben's company recovered the "Pelican in Piety". The find was valued at $885,000.

In July 2013, Brisben and his crew aboard the M/V Capitana made headlines with the recovery of 51 gold escudos valued at $300,000. Days later on Sept 1, 2013 a family of subcontractors recovered 50 feet of gold chain and 5 gold escudos valued at over $350,000.

On July 28, 2015, Brisben announced that the same family of subcontractors had found over 50 gold coins worth approximately 1 Million Dollars. The centerpiece of the find was an extremely rare coin called a Royal dated 1715. The Royal coin was a perfect specimen of Spanish coinage made specifically for King Phillip V.

On July 30 and 31 of 2015, Brisben and his crew aboard the M/V Capitana made one of the most significant finds in 1715 Fleet History. On the actual 300th Anniversary of the sinking of the 1715 Fleet, they recovered 300 gold coins including 7 Royals. Over the next week of salvage they added 50 more coins including 2 Royals. The story of the recovery of 350 Spanish Escudos and 9 Royals worth 4.5 Million Dollars made headlines worldwide. CBS THIS MORNING broke the story live on August 19, 2015.
