= Alex Hershaft =

American activist

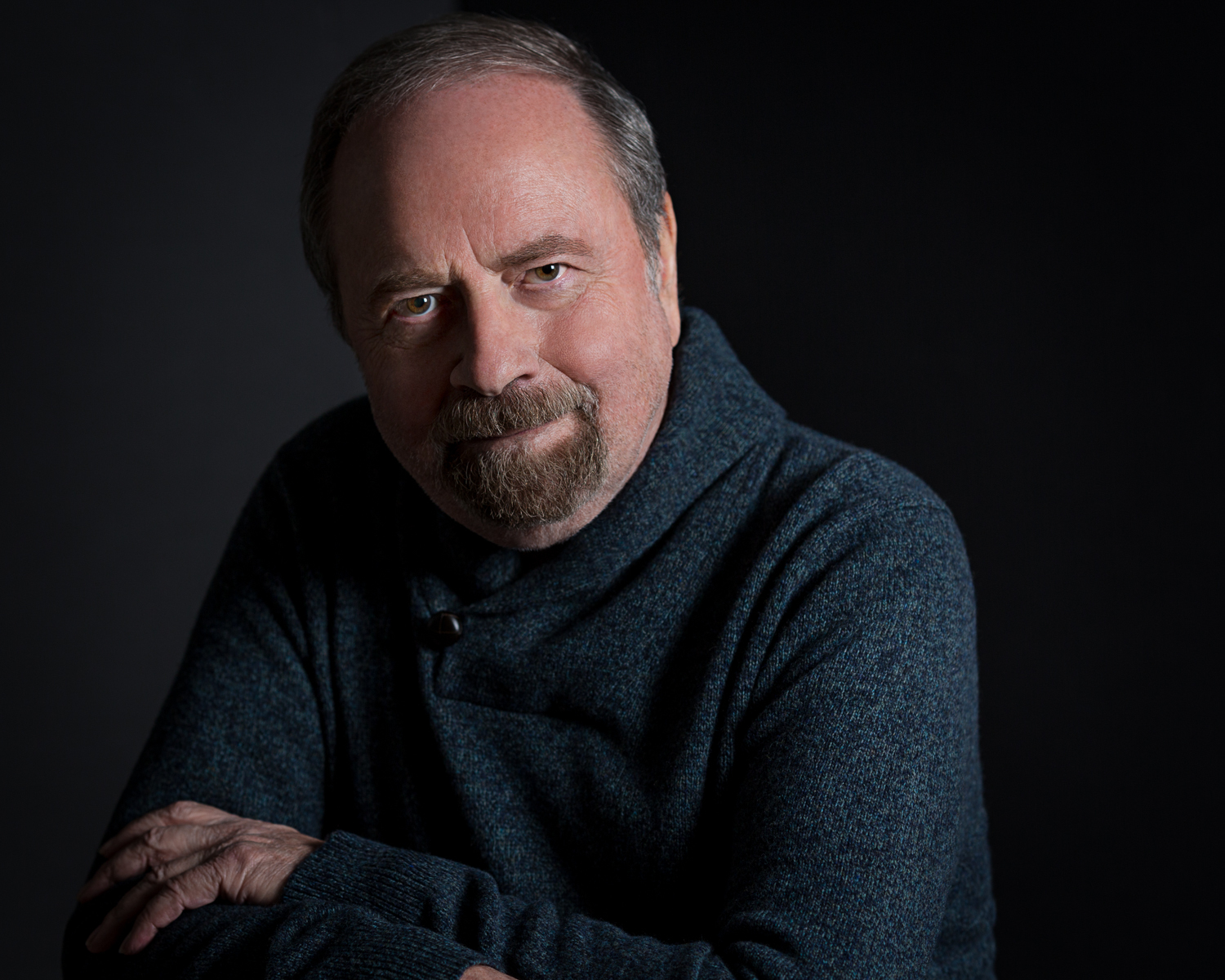
- Hershaft's portrait
- Born: 1 July 1934 (age 92); Warsaw, Poland
- Education: Ph.D, Inorganic Chemistry
- Alma mater: Iowa State University
- Occupations: Entrepreneur, author, activist
- Known for: Co-founding the U.S. animal rights movement Chair of Animal Rights National Conference author of theveganblog.org Holocaust survivor Founding President of Farm Animal Rights Movement
- Children: Monica Larissa Hershaft
- Website: alexhershaft.com

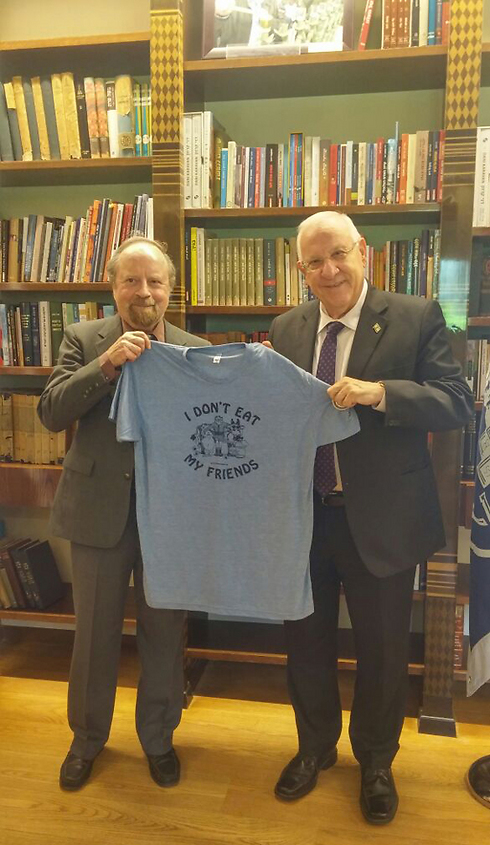
Alex Hershaft meeting with Israel's president Reuven Rivlin during a speaking tour in May 2015

Alex Hershaft (born 1 July 1934) is an American Holocaust survivor, and co-founder and president of the Farm Animal Rights Movement (FARM), the United States' oldest (1976) organization devoted exclusively to promoting the rights of animals not to be raised for food. Previously, he has had a 30-year career in materials science and environmental consulting and a role in movements for religious freedom and environmental quality.

== Family and early life ==
Hershaft was born in Warsaw, Poland, on July 1, 1934, to fairly assimilated Jewish parents Jozef and Sabina Herszaft. Sabina was a mathematician. Jozef was a chemist researching the properties of heavy water (used as a coolant for nuclear reactors) at University of Warsaw with his colleague Jozef Rotblat.

Their research was in great demand, as Western scientists began to recognize the potential of harnessing nuclear energy, and both received visas to continue their work in the U.K. and the U.S. Rotblat left for the U.K just before Hitler invaded Poland in 1939 and eventually received the 1995 Nobel Peace Prize for his subsequent opposition to nuclear weapons. Herszaft insisted on visas for his wife and young son, but those came too late.

During the war, the family was forced to move into the Warsaw Ghetto, with Sabina's parents, across the street from the infamous Pawiak prison. As the Nazis began exterminating the Ghetto in late 1942, sending inmates to the Treblinka death camp, all three were able to escape to the Christian side and remain in hiding. Sabina and Alex were liberated by the allies in the spring of 1945. After the war and five years in an Italian refugee camp, Sabina emigrated to Israel, while 16-year-old Alexander arrived in the U.S. in January 1951. Sabina died in Israel in 1996.

== Research and consulting career ==
Hershaft received his B.A. in 1955 from the University of Connecticut, where he was active in the student senate, the school newspaper, and the soccer team. He went on to study polymer chemistry at the Brooklyn Polytechnic Institute. He gained his Ph.D. in inorganic chemistry in 1961 from Iowa State University, where he was employed by the Ames Laboratory of the Atomic Energy Commission.

Hershaft began his science career at the Technion – Israel Institute of Technology, where he taught graduate classes in X-ray crystallography. He then spent a year running the chemistry department at the Israel Institute for Scientific Translations in Jerusalem. Upon returning to the United States in 1963, Hershaft analyzed naval operations for the Center for Naval Analyses in Arlington, Virginia.

In 1967, Hershaft joined the Grumman Aerospace Corporation in Bethpage, New York, to review potential areas of new business in air and water pollution control, and solid waste management. In 1969, one year before the first Earth Day, he launched, then managed the Environmental Technology Seminar, a regional forum for study and discussion of tri-state (New York–New Jersey–Delaware) environmental issues.

In 1972, Hershaft moved to the Washington, D.C., area. He joined the consulting firm Booz Allen Hamilton in Bethesda, Maryland, to evaluate water management alternatives, impacts of electric power plants and transmission lines, and costs and benefit of data from the Earth Resources Technology Satellite.

Hershaft spent a couple more years directing environmental studies for the U.S. Environmental Protection Agency and U.S. Council on Environmental Quality with two erstwhile consulting firms: Enviro Control and Interstate Electronics Corporation.

Between 1977 and 1981, Hershaft served as a senior scientist with the Mitre Corporation in McLean, Virginia. He studied emissions from various heating fuels and prepared protocols for assessing and cleaning up hazardous waste sites as part of the U.S. Superfund program.

== Social justice career ==
Hershaft had been involved in student extracurricular activities throughout his undergraduate and graduate studies. At the University of Connecticut, he served on both the Student Senate and the Campus newspaper.

In November 1961, while working at the Technion – Israel Institute of Technology, Hershaft staged a major demonstration in Tel-Aviv, leading to the formation of the League for Abolition of Religious Coercion in Israel, a massive movement seeking to end repression of secular, Reform, and Conservative Judaism, as well as mixed marriages, by entrenched Orthodox authorities.

Two years later, he turned over leadership to Uzzi Ornan and his other Israeli deputies, as he returned to the U.S. to seek support for the organization. Following the upheaval of the 1967 Six-Day War, the cause of religious freedom in Israel was taken up by the Citizen Rights Party (Ratz) (now Meretz).

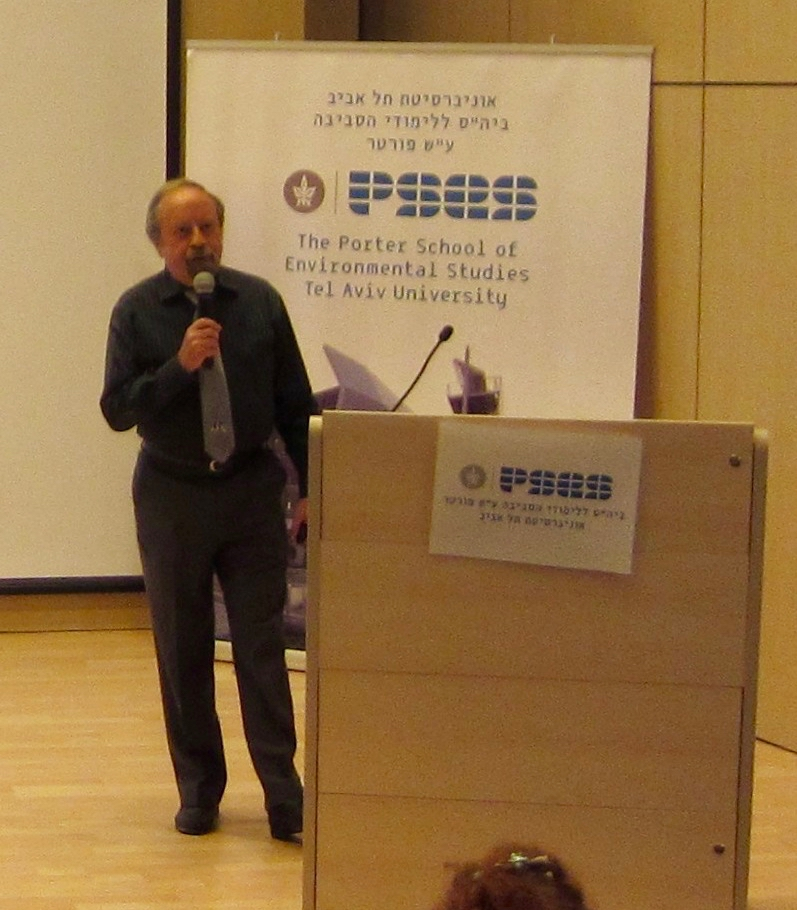
Alex Hershaft at Tel Aviv University in May 2015

Between 1965 and 1978, Hershaft served on the board of the American Humanist Association (AHA), a national organization that affirms the ability and responsibility of human beings to lead ethical and fulfilling lives without reference to a supernatural being.

"Most people are neither good nor evil. They are simply puppets of their capricious social norms. Nazi norms decreed that a German with two Jewish grandparents got to live, but one with three Jewish grandparents must die. Our norms decree that a dog gets to live, but a pig must die.""

— Alex Hershaft
October 2, 2015.

In 1961, shortly after arriving in Israel, Hershaft dropped meat from his diet. In August 1975, he became involved in the vegetarian movement after attending the World Vegetarian Congress in Orono, Maine, and meeting Jay Dinshah. He reports that Robin Hur (then of Harvard Business School in Boston) persuaded him in 1981, after 20 years as a vegetarian, to become vegan.

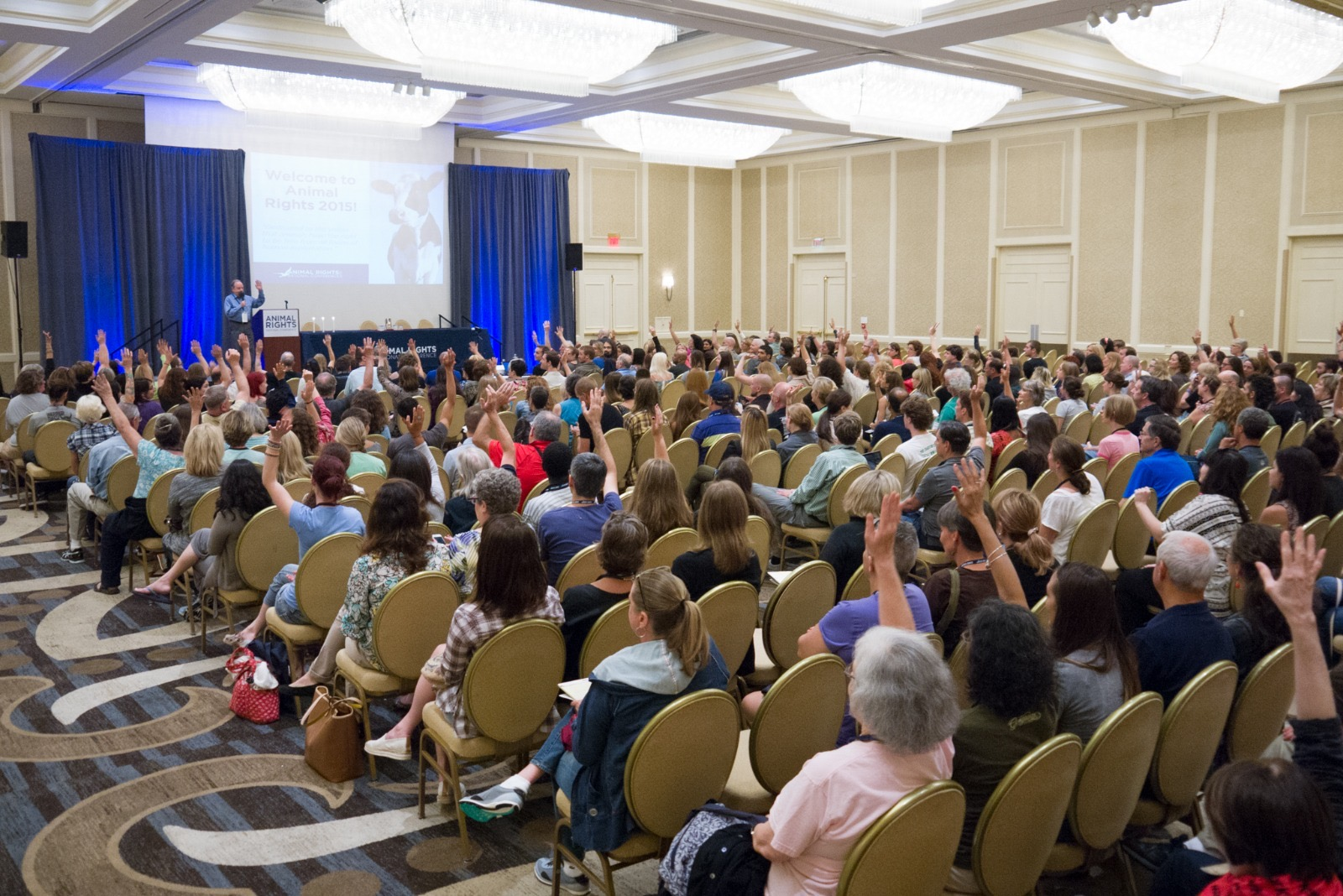
Alex Hershaft addressing the 2015 Animal Rights National Conference in Washington

In 1976, Hershaft founded the Vegetarian Information Service (VIS) to distribute information on the benefits of a vegetarian diet. That same year, he participated in hearings before the Senate Select Committee on Nutrition and Human Needs, which led to the publication of Dietary Goals for the United States, and eventually to the periodic publication of the Dietary Guidelines for Americans. Subsequently, he testified before Congress in favor of the 1978 National Consumer Nutrition Information Act and the Federal Meat Inspection Act of 1978.

During that period, Hershaft also organized several conferences on strategies for promoting vegetarianism. Some participants, influenced by Peter Singer's 1975 treatise Animal Liberation, felt that the scope of these conferences should be expanded to include discussions of animal rights.

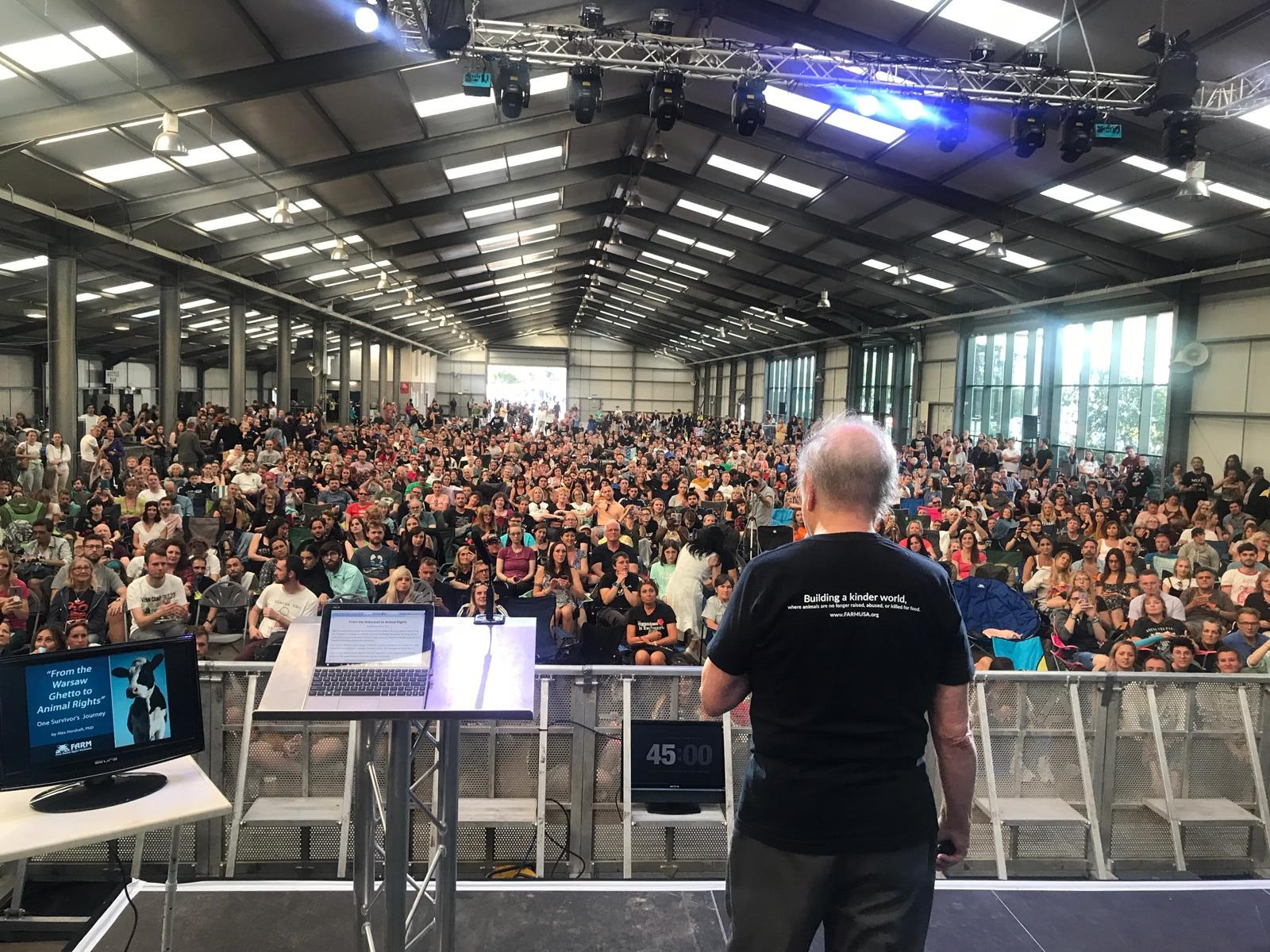
Alex Hershaft addressing the annual Vegan Camp Out in England in 2019

Accordingly, in the summer of 1981, Hershaft organized Action For Life, a national conference at Cedar Crest College in Allentown, Pennsylvania, that effectively launched the U.S. animal rights movement. Participants included such animal rights pioneers as Cleveland Amory, Ingrid Newkirk, Alex Pacheco, Peter Singer, Henry Spira, Gretchen Wyler, as well as radio host Thom Hartmann. These conferences continued for seven more years in San Francisco (1982), Montclair, New Jersey (1983), Los Angeles (1985), Chicago (1986), Cambridge, Massachusetts (1987), and Washington (1984 and 1991).

Immediately following the 1981 conference, Hershaft founded the Farm Animal Rights Movement (FARM) to promote a vegan lifestyle and animal rights.

As FARM president, Hershaft launched World Farm Animals Day in 1983, Great American Meatout in 1985, Veal Ban Campaign in 1986, Letters from FARM in 1996, and 10 Billion Lives in 2011.

In 1997, Hershaft launched a second round of 20 Animal Rights National Conferences that attracted 1500 participants and rallied and inspired the US animal rights movement each year.

In 2015, Hershaft began reflecting on the many parallels between the Holocaust and the mass slaughter of animals for food, particularly the size and efficiency of the operations, the respective personnel structures, the surrounding secrecy, the use of cattle cars to transport victims, the cruelties preceding death, and the arbitrary respective social norms that induce ordinary people to perpetrate or enable extraordinary atrocities. He conducted speaking tours of Israel, Germany, Poland, England, and the US. Some of the talks appear on YouTube. A book and a documentary are in the works.

In 2020, Hershaft relinquished the day-to-day operation of FARM to executive director Eric Lindstrom but stayed on as an active president.

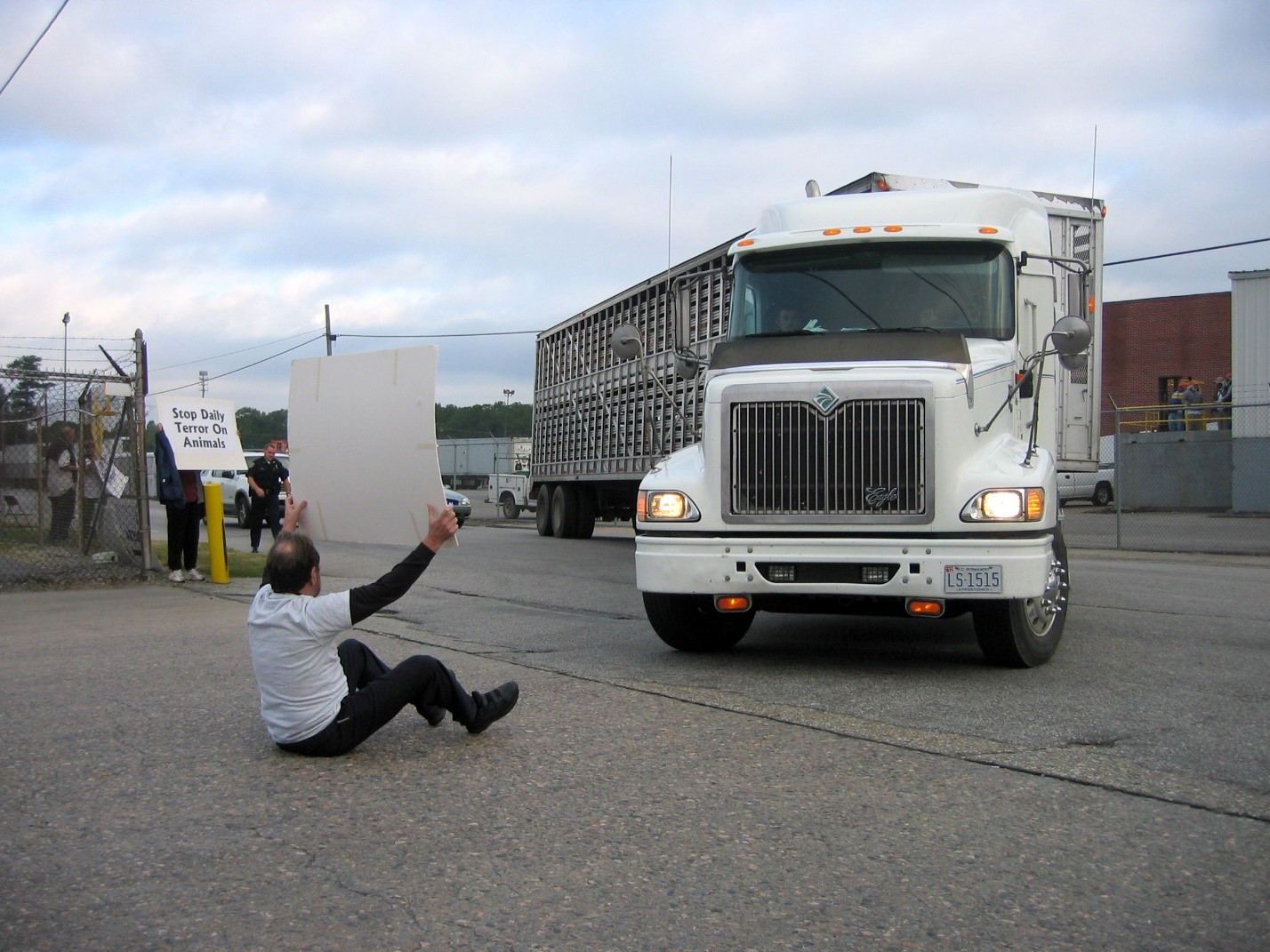
Alex Hershaft blocking a truck from entering the Smithfield, Virginia, slaughterhouse in 2005

Hershaft has written several hundred letters to newspaper editors about the merits of a vegan diet. He has been featured in several news reports and feature articles. At the animal rights national conferences, he lectured on personal growth, leadership, social change, campaign strategies, and movement building.

== Honors ==
Hershaft has been listed in Marquis' Who’s Who in America, American Men and Women of Science, and other biographical directories. He has been inducted into both the U.S. Vegetarian Hall of Fame (1998) and the U.S. Animal Rights Hall of Fame (2001).

Between 1984 and 2000, Hershaft served on the governing council of the International Vegetarian Union. Between 2001 and 2009, he served on the board of In Defense of Animals, a national animal rights organization based in San Rafael, California.

== Personal life ==
Hershaft met Eugenie (Genia) Krystal while working at the Israel Institute for Scientific Translations, and they were married in Jerusalem in 1962. They were divorced in 1979. Their daughter, Monica Larissa Hershaft, was born in 1966. After recovering from a long illness, she opened a holistic health and nutrition wellness center in Los Angeles in 2008. She now resides and practices in Scottsdale, Arizona.

He currently resides in Bethesda, MD. Hershaft became a vegetarian in 1961 and a vegan in 1981. He has been physically active throughout his life, mostly by playing soccer on various school and county teams, running marathons in the 1980s and 1990s and more recently, by engaging in regular folk dancing and swimming.

== See also ==
- List of animal rights advocates
