= Shepard Coleman =

American musical director

- Born: 1924; New York City, New York, U.S.
- Died: May 12, 1998 (age 74); Ridgewood, New Jersey, U.S.
- Occupation: Musical director
- Spouse: Gretchen Wyler (m. 1956; div. 1968)

Shepard Coleman (1924 - 12 May 1998) was an American musical director. Many credits to his name, Coleman won a Tony Award for his vocal arrangements for Hello, Dolly! in 1964, and was the musical director for the Broadway debut of the well known play Oh, What a Lovely War in 1965.

== Early life ==
Coleman was born in New York City in 1924 to Albert and Esther Cohen (Coleman's real name) and had three siblings. Coleman attended the Juilliard School and became a cellist.

== Career ==
As a cellist, Coleman played in the orchestra of many Broadway musicals: Lost in the Stars (1949), Guys and Dolls (1950), Silk Stockings (1955), and The Most Happy Fella (1956). For his efforts as musical director and conductor on the original Broadway production of Hello, Dolly!, Coleman was awarded a 1964 Tony Award. Shortly after, he became the musical director for the Broadway debut of Joan Littlewood's new musical Oh, What a Lovely War. The cast featured well known English actors including Victor Spinetti, Brian Murphy and Barbara Windsor.

== Death ==
Coleman died at the Valley Hospital in Ridgewood, N.J. aged 74.

== Personal life ==
Coleman was married to American actress and dancer Gretchen Wyler from July 7, 1956 until their divorce in 1968. Coleman also had a relationship with actress Barbara Windsor during Oh, What a Lovely War.
