= Farm Animal Rights Movement =

International nonprofit organization

- Founded: 1976; 50 years ago
- Founder: Alex Hershaft
- Type: Nonprofit
- Purpose: Animal rights
- Headquarters: Washington, DC
- Location: Bethesda, Maryland, United States
- Employees: 5
- Website: farmusa.org

Farm Animal Rights Movement (FARM) is an international nonprofit organization working to promote a vegan lifestyle and animal rights through public education and grass roots outreach. It operates ten national and international programs from its headquarters in Bethesda, Maryland.

FARM has the abolitionist vision of a world where animals are free from all forms of human exploitation, including, food and clothing, research and testing, entertainment and hunting. FARM's mission is to spare the largest number of animals from being bred, abused, and slaughtered for food, as this accounts for 98% of all animal abuse and slaughter.

FARM was co-founded by Alex Hershaft in 1976 as the Vegetarian Information Service to distribute information on the benefits of a vegetarian diet. In 1981, it became the Farm Animal Reform Movement by embracing veganism and the right of animals not to be used for food. In 2011, it adopted the DBA of Farm Animal Rights Movement to emphasize its commitment to ending the use of animals for food, rather than merely reforming their treatment.

== History ==
In August 1975, Alex Hershaft became involved in the vegetarian movement after attending the World Vegetarian Congress in Orono, Maine, and meeting Jay Dinshah.

In 1976, Hershaft founded the Vegetarian Information Service (VIS) to distribute information on the benefits of a vegetarian diet. That same year, he participated in the hearings before the Senate Select Committee on Nutrition and Human Needs, which led to the publication of Dietary Goals for the United States, and eventually to the periodic publication of the Dietary Guidelines for Americans. Subsequently, VIS testified before Congress in favor of the 1978 National Consumer Nutrition Information Act and the Federal Meat Inspection Act of 1978. Accordingly, in the summer of 1981, Hershaft organized Action For Life, a national conference in Allentown, Pennsylvania, that effectively launched the U.S. animal rights movement. Participants included such animal rights pioneers as Cleveland Amory, Ingrid Newkirk, Alex Pacheco, Peter Singer, Henry Spira, Gretchen Wyler, as well as radio host Thom Hartmann. These conferences continued for seven more years in San Francisco (1982), Montclair, NJ (1983), Los Angeles (1985), Chicago (1986), Cambridge, Massachusetts (1987), and Washington (1984 and 1991).

Immediately following the 1981 conference, Hershaft co-founded the Farm Animal Rights Movement (FARM) to promote a vegan lifestyle and animal rights. FARM's early programs were Gentle Thanksgiving (1976), Action for Life conferences (1981–1991), Compassion Campaign (1982–1992), Veal Ban Campaign (1982–1986), World Day for Farmed Animals (1983), Great American Meatout (1985), Letters from FARM (1996), the second series of annual national animal rights conferences (1997), Consumers for Healthy Options in Children's Education (CHOICE) (1999–2009), Sabina Fund (1999), and Vegan Earth Day (2001). As of 2020, Eric C. Lindstrom is the executive director of FARM.

== Great American MeatOut ==
Playing off the "Great American Smokeout", the Great American MeatOut was launched in 1985 to protest a U.S. Senate resolution proclaiming National Meat Week. The occasion is observed each year by hundreds of activists in the U.S. and two dozen other countries with food samplings, leafleting, information tables, and other educational events. Visitors are asked to pledge that they will kick the meat habit on March 20 (first day of spring). Special MeatOut proclamations have been issued by 40 governors and 47 mayors of large American cities.

== 10 Billion Lives ==
FARM's 10 Billion Lives campaign paid people $1 to watch a four-minute video that begins by noting the viewer's respect for the unique personality of the family pet and the parallel with farmed animals. It continued with graphic factory farm and slaughterhouse footage and closed by empowering the viewer to change the horrors he/she just witnessed by pledging a number of vegan days per week. The video was screened at rock concerts (including the Warped Tour) and college campuses by a specially designed truck and mobile kiosks.

Each viewer received a series of eight weekly introductions to veganism, then a weekly Meatout Mondays newsletter containing a recipe, product or book review, health news, and human interest story. This reflects FARM's concept of "sustained vegan advocacy," which posits that the initial contact must be followed by weekly support to prevent regression.

== Animal rights conferences ==
FARM's 1981 first-ever animal rights conference laid the foundation for the U.S. animal rights movement. Seven additional annual conferences followed in 1982 (San Francisco), 1983 (Montclair, NJ), 1984 (Washington, DC), 1985 (Los Angeles), 1986 (Chicago), 1987 (Cambridge, Massachusetts), and 1991 (Washington, DC). Between 1987 and 1996, the annual conferences were taken over by the National Alliance for Animals.

In 1997, FARM resumed management of the animal rights movement's annual conferences, alternating locations between Washington, DC, and Los Angeles. A typical conference involves a thousand attendees, 90 presenters from 60 organizations, a hundred sessions, 90 exhibits, and several new video documentaries.

== Animal Charity Evaluators review ==
Animal charity evaluator Animal Charity Evaluators has named FARM as a Standout Charity in their May 2014 and December 2014 reviews. The December 2014 review states that FARM's openness to change based on new evidence, their stable leadership and organizational structure, and their transparency are all reasons for their selection as a Standout Charity.

== See also ==
- List of animal rights groups
