= Jim Mason (activist) =

American lawyer, journalist and animal rights activist

- Born: September 30, 1940 (age 85); Superior, Wisconsin
- Occupations: Lawyer, journalist

Jim Mason (born September 30, 1940) is an American lawyer, journalist and animal rights activist.

== Biography ==
Mason was born in Superior, Wisconsin on September 30, 1940. He grew up in rural Missouri on a farm. He was educated at Washington University in St. Louis. He dropped out and spent the next two years traveling in New York and New England before joining the United States Army. After he completed his military service, Mason attended the University of Missouri where he obtained his J.D. degree. He formed his own law practice in Bridgeport in 1973.

Mason was introduced to philosopher Peter Singer in 1974. The next year they began discussing the possibility of collaborating on a book-length treatment of factory farming. Mason did much research on factory farming and travelled around the United States and Canada visiting intensive farming facilities. Their book Animal Factories was first published in 1980 and revised in 1990. It provides a critical review and photographic documentation of factory farming practices in North America. The book is known for having "played a role in the United States similar to that of Harrison's book in the United Kingdom and Europe in providing a critical expose of the factory farm system."

He was elected to the U.S. Animal Rights Hall of Fame in 2001. Mason is a vegan.

== The Animals Agenda ==
Mason was the co-founder and editor of the animal rights magazine Agenda, later titled The Animals Agenda. He left the publication in 1986.

== Selected publications ==
- MADNESS: The Deep Driver of Our Climate Crisis Lessons From My Family Farm (2024)
- Animal Factories (with Peter Singer, 1990)
- An Unnatural Order: Uncovering the Roots of Our Domination of Nature and Each Other (1993)
- The Way We Eat: Why Our Food Choices Matter (with Peter Singer, 2006)
