= Matt Ball =

American animal activist (born 1968)

- Born: 1968 (age 57–58); Toledo, Ohio, US
- Education: University of Cincinnati; University of Illinois Urbana-Champaign (MS); Carnegie Mellon University (MS)
- Known for: Co-founder and President of One Step for Animals
- Notable work: The Animal Activist's Handbook (2009)
- Website: www.mattball.org

Matthew Michael Ball (born 1968) is an American animal activist. He is co-founder and President of One Step for Animals.

Previously, he was Director of Engagement and Outreach at Farm Sanctuary, and before that, Senior Advisor for VegFund. In 1993, Ball co-founded Vegan Outreach. Ball served as the group's Executive Director for 21 years. Ball is credited with helping shift the animal rights' movement to a more utilitarian focus, particularly with a focus on chickens. He is the co-author of The Animal Activist's Handbook (2009), author of The Accidental Activist (2014), and author of Losing My Religions (2022). He was inducted into the Animal Rights Hall of Fame in 2005.

== Biography ==
Ball was born in Toledo, Ohio. His parents are Cornelius Francis Ball and Judith Anderson Ball, both of Toledo. Before founding Vegan Outreach, Ball received a bachelor in aerospace engineering in 1991 from the University of Cincinnati, an M.S. in Forest Ecology in 1993 at the University of Illinois, and an M.S. in Engineering and Public Policy in 1997 at Carnegie Mellon University, during which time he was a Department of Energy Global Change Fellow. He also held a research fellowship in the Department of Biology at the University of Pittsburgh.

Ball married Dr. Anne Green, a fellow advocate and co-founder of Vegan Outreach, on February 20, 1993 in Urbana, Illinois. Their child Elwen Katya Green was born on July 16, 1994, in Pennsylvania and was raised as a vegan. They live in Tucson, Arizona.

Ball says: "[W]e must focus on getting people to consider their first step toward compassion, rather than arguing for our current philosophy or diet. Most non-vegetarians tune out when told to go vegan but may consider starting to make changes like adopting Meatless Mondays or eating fewer chickens."

== Publications ==
- Ball, Matt (2022-10-01). Losing My Religions: A half-failed life of airplanes, agony, animals, basketball, bliss, cameras, chaos, cops... One Step for Animals..
- Ball, Matt (2014-06-30). Green, Anne (ed.). Accidental Activist: Stories, Speeches, Articles, and Interviews by Vegan Outreach's Cofounder. Lantern Books. ISBN 978-1-59056-454-7., Foreword by Peter Singer, Introduction by Paul Shapiro.
- —— (December 2013) [2005]. "A Meaningful Life: Making a Real Difference in Today's World". Vegan Outreach.
- —— (December 2013). "A Meaningful Life: Making a Real Difference in Today's World" (PDF). Vegan Outreach (16-page pamphlet). Archived (PDF) from the original on 2014-04-08.
- —— (2012). "Donner un sens à sa vie: comment agir dans le monde aujourd'hui" [Giving a meaning to one's life: how to act in the world today] (PDF). Vegan Outreach (in French).
- —— (2013-03-25). "Chapter 1". In Davidow, Ben (ed.). Uncaged: Top Activists Share Their Wisdom on Effective Farm Animal Advocacy (Kindle ed.). San Francisco: Ben Davidow. ASIN B00C0NF36G.
- ——; Friedrich, Bruce (2009-04-06). The Animal Activist's Handbook: Maximizing Our Positive Impact in Today's World. Lantern Books. ISBN 978-1590561201. Foreword by Ingrid Newkirk.
- —— (2005-08-26). "Chapter 14: Living and Working in Defense of Animals". In Singer, Peter (ed.). In Defense of Animals: The Second Wave. Wiley-Blackwell. ISBN 978-1405119412.
- Eisman, George; ——; Green, Anne (1994) [1984]. The Most Noble Diet: Food Selection and Ethics (4th ed.). Burdett, New York: Diet-Ethics. ISBN 978-0961443511. Foreword by Michael Klaper, M.D.

== See also ==
- Animal protectionism
- List of animal rights advocates
- List of vegans
- Veganism
