= 1715 Treasure Fleet =

Spanish treasure fleet

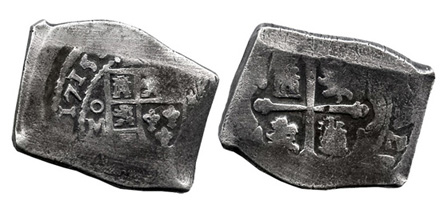
8 reales Mexican silver Spanish dollar, full date 1715, recovered from the 1715 fleet

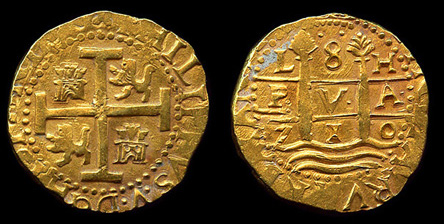
Rare 8 escudos lima dated 1710, recovered from the 1715 Fleet

The 1715 Treasure Fleet was a combination of two Spanish treasure fleets returning from the New World to Spain, the "Nueva España Fleet", under Captain-General Don Juan Esteban de Ubilla, and the "Tierra Firme Fleet", under Don Antonio de Echeverz y Zubiza. At two in the morning on Wednesday, July 31, 1715, seven days after departing from Havana, Cuba, all eleven ships of the fleet were lost in a hurricane along the east coast of Florida. A 12th ship, the French frigate Le Grifon, had sailed with the fleet. Its captain was unfamiliar with the Florida coastline and elected to stay further out to sea. Le Grifon safely returned to Europe.

Because the fleet was carrying silver, it is also known as the 1715 Plate Fleet (plata being the Spanish word for silver). According to Cuban records, around 1,500 sailors perished in the storm, while a small number survived in lifeboats.

Many other ships, including pirates, took part in the initial salvage. By the end of August, relief ships from Havana arrived at the site of the sunken fleet. After the Urca de Lima's cargo was salvaged, she was burned to the waterline to hide her position from pirates and privateers of other nations, who had become aware of the sunken treasure fleet as well. In December, the pirates Henry Jennings and Charles Vane captured a Spanish mail ship and learned the exact position of the main Spanish salvage camp and of the Urca de Lima from her captain, Pedro de la Vega. In early 1716 they surprised the camp with a superior force and Salmón had no choice but to surrender the rest of the salvaged treasure. The pirates made off with an estimated £87,500 of gold and silver.

== Exhibits and preserves ==
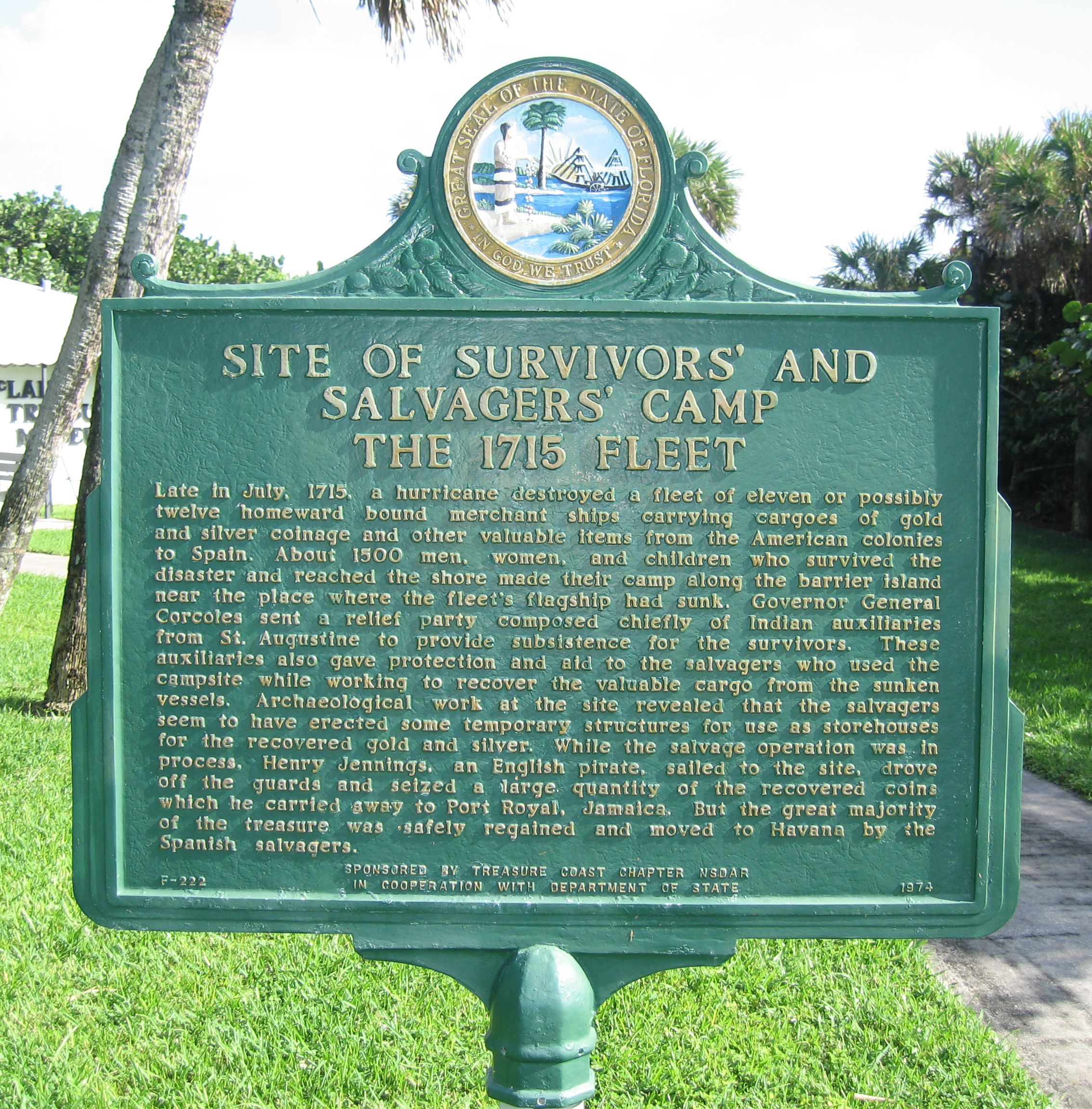
Historical marker designating the site of the Survivors' and Salvagers' Camp - 1715 Fleet

Corrigan’s Beach ShipWreck
- Location within Florida
- 27.7478°N 80.3561°W
- Type: Shipwreck
- Nearest city: Vero Beach

Treasure hunter Kip Wagner found the first of the fleet's treasure in 1961, and continued searching throughout the remaining decade, eventually finding millions of dollars' worth of gold, silver, and other artifacts. He and his team built an exhibit held at National Geographic "Explorers Hall" in Washington, D.C. that was featured in the January 1965 issue of National Geographic. This was the beginning of a fine collection of 1715 Plate Fleet treasure that brought hundreds of visitors from around the world. Wagner published his book Pieces of Eight (Recovering The Riches of A Lost Spanish Fleet) in 1966. It is a detailed account of the finding and exploration of many of these shipwrecks along Florida's "Treasure Coast". An exhibit was set up with a grand opening on May 1, 1967, at the First National Bank of Satellite Beach, Florida.

In 1987, another ship in the fleet, the Urca de Lima, became the first shipwreck in the Florida Underwater Archaeological Preserves.

Mel Fisher's company, Mel Fisher's Treasures, sold the rights to the 1715 Fleet shipwreck to 1715 Fleet-Queens Jewels, LLC.

On July 31, 2015 (the 300th anniversary of the sinking), 1715 Fleet-Queens Jewels, LLC and their founder Brent Brisben discovered $4.5 million in gold coins off the coast of Vero Beach, Florida; the coins came from the 1715 Fleet shipwreck site known as the Corrigans wreck. During a previous 2015 find from the Douglass Beach wreck, 101 coins were recovered, of which 50 were stolen by the Schmitt family (subcontractors to 1715 Fleet-Queens Jewels, LLC). In 2024, 37 of the coins were recovered by law enforcement and turned over to the Court.

In 2025, over $1 million worth of silver and gold coins (reales and escudos) as well as other gold artifacts were found by 1715 Fleet-Queens Jewels, LLC. Over 1,000 silver coins were recovered by Capt. Levin Shavers and the crew of the M/V Just Right during the 2025 summer salvage season. Under Florida law, any “treasure trove” or other historic artifacts “abandoned” on state-owned lands or in state waters belong to the state, 1715 Fleet-Queens Jewels, LLC is permitted to carry out salvage operations. Florida officials select up to 20% of the items to keep for the public, in a negotiation process that is ultimately approved by a federal court. The remaining artifacts are split equally among the salvage company’s owners and its subcontractors.

== List of identified ships ==
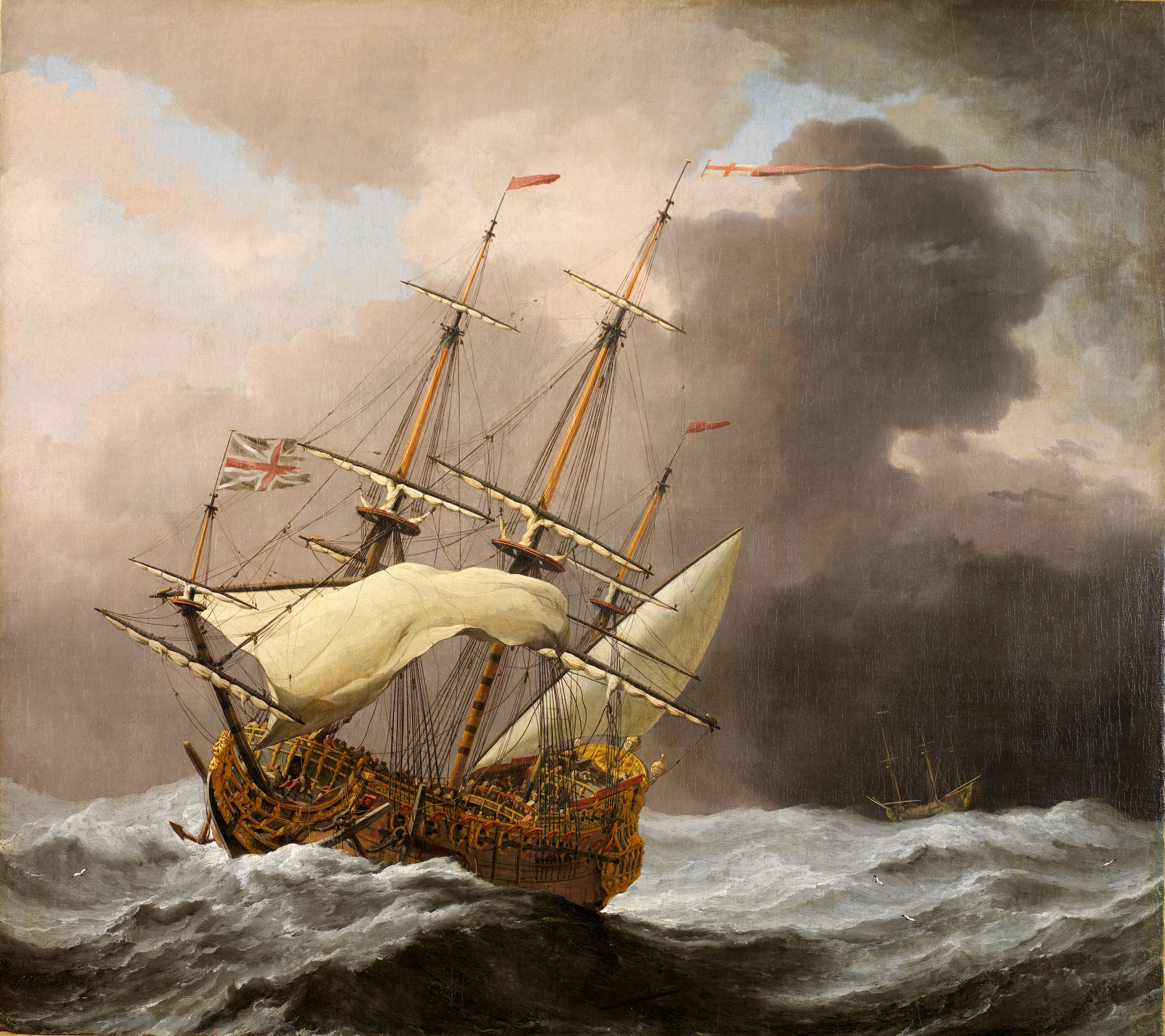
The English Ship Hampton Court in a Gale, Willem van de Velde the Younger 1680s

- Urca de Lima (Santisima Trinidad y Nuestra Señora de la Concepción)
- former HMS Hampton Court (Nuestra Señora del Carmen y San Antonio)
- Santo Cristo de San Roman
- Nuestra Señora de las Nieves
- Nuestra Señora del Rosario y San Francisco Xavier
- Nuestra Señora del Carmen y San Antonio
- Nuestra Señora de Regla
- Nuestra Señora de la Popa (La Holandesa)

New evidence (see Jorge Proctor, 2021) shows that the Douglass Beach Wreck, long believed to be the Nuestra Señora de las Nieves, is in fact the Santa Rita y Las Animas, bought by Ubilla in Cuba and renamed Nuestra Señora de Regla, like his flagship.

== In popular culture ==
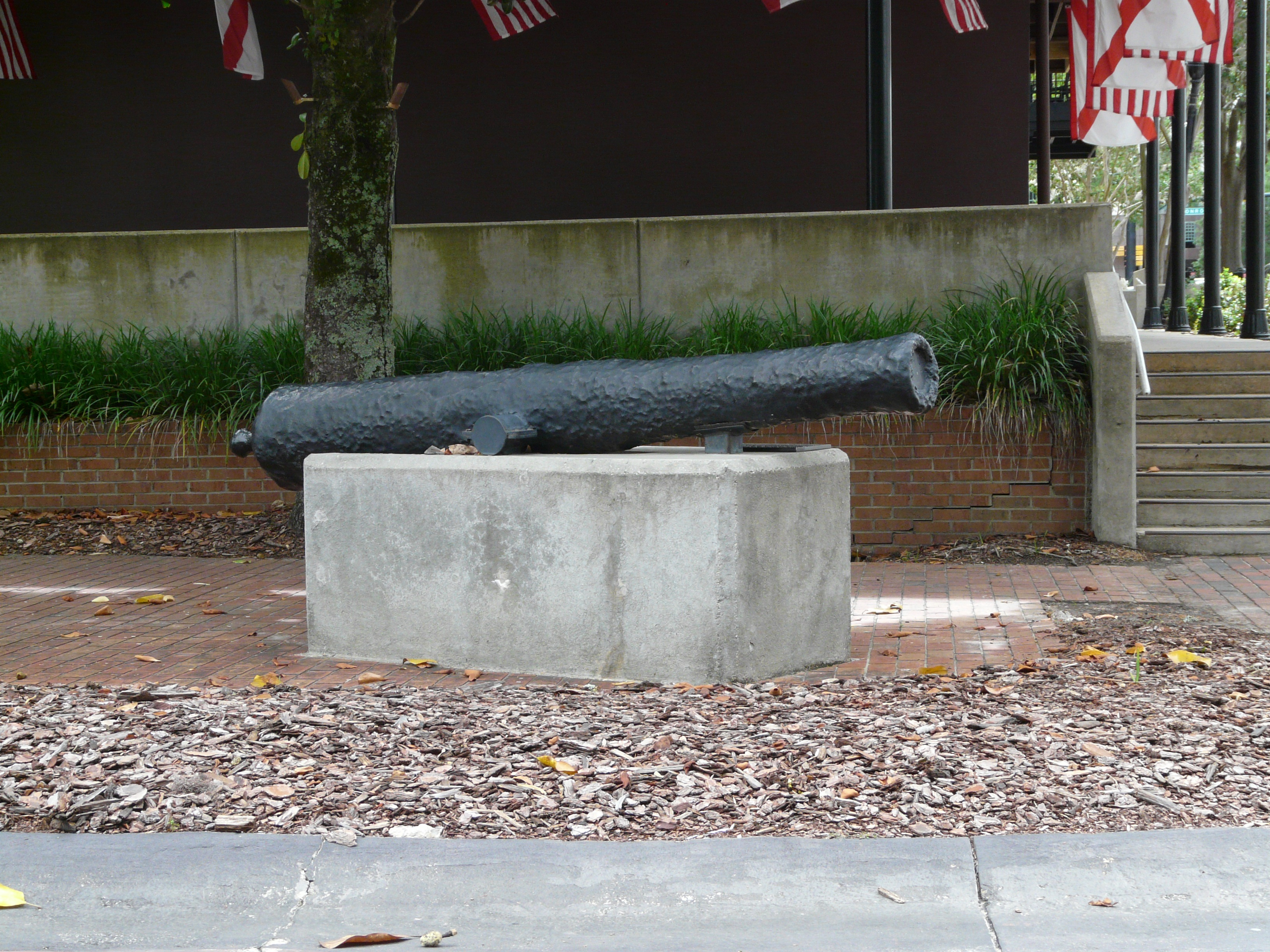
Cannon recovered from the fleet's wreck site on display in Tallahassee, Florida

In the 2008 movie Fool's Gold, the protagonists are searching for the location of one of the sunken ships of the treasure fleet (along with its treasure).

The treasure fleet was used as the backdrop for a scene in the video game Assassin's Creed IV: Black Flag. The main character, Edward Kenway, is aboard one of the ships in the fleet as a prisoner, and manages to escape with the help of his future quartermaster, Adéwalé, recruiting other captive pirates as a crew. The pirates eventually manage to escape the fleet and the hurricane by stealing the twelfth ship, the brig El Dorado, which Edward keeps and renames the Jackdaw, becoming the player's ship for the rest of the game. Edward later makes reference to the event when Blackbeard inquires as to how he got the Jackdaw, and the latter then suggests visiting the site to salvage some of the lost treasure.

In the 1977 movie The Deep David Sanders (Nick Nolte) and his British girlfriend Gail Berke (Jacqueline Bisset) recover a number of artifacts (from a diving expedition off the coast of Bermuda, homeland of Captain Henry Jennings), including an ampule of amber-colored liquid and a medallion bearing the image of a woman and the letters 'S.C.O.P.N' (an abbreviation of the Latin 'Santa Clara Ora Pro Nobis' that translates to English as 'Saint Clara Pray For Us') and a date, 1714. St. David's Lighthouse keeper and treasure-hunter Romer Treece (Robert Shaw) believes the medallion had come from the wreckage of the surviving twelfth ship [of the 1715 Treasure Fleet], thought to be a French tobacco ship that was being protected by the 1715 Fleet and named Grifon (spelled "El Grifón" in Peter Benchley's novel The Deep). The ship was thought to be returning to Havana, Cuba for repairs but instead sank off the coast of Bermuda.

The plot of the Starz show Black Sails revolves heavily around the 1715 Treasure Fleet in its first season. The largest of the ships, the Urca de Lima, is wrecked during the hurricane off the coast of Florida, carrying five million Spanish dollars' worth in gold, silver and other precious materials, pursued by Captain Flint and his crew. The treasure, colloquially referred to as "the Urca gold", is an important plot device throughout the series.

== See also ==
- McLarty Treasure Museum
- Mel Fisher's Treasure Museum
- Piracy in the Caribbean
- St. Lucie County Historical Museum
- Survivors' and Salvagers' Camp – 1715 Fleet
- Treasure hunting
