= Ben White (finance journalist) =

American journalist (died 2024)

Ben White (1972 – June 1, 2024) was an American journalist known for his coverage of finance and policy.

White was the chief economic correspondent for Politico. Prior to joining Politico in 2009, White worked for The New York Times. Between 2005 and 2007, he was U.S. Banking Editor and Wall Street correspondent for the Financial Times. White had previously been Wall Street correspondent for The Washington Post''.

White wrote Politico's Morning Money column on the interface between public policy and finance. Business Insider described White's coverage of the fiscal cliff as "second to none."

In 2009, while working at The New York Times, White shared a Society of Business Editors and Writers (SABEW) award for breaking news coverage of the 2008 financial crisis.

White was a 1994 graduate of Kenyon College. He died after a brief illness on June 1, 2024.
