= Olympiastadion =

Olympiastadion is the German, Finnish and Swedish word for Olympic Stadium and may refer to:

- Stockholm Olympic Stadium, the host of the 1912 Summer Olympics (though mostly referred as simply Stockholms Stadion)
- Olympiastadion (Berlin), the host of the 1936 Summer Olympics
- Helsinki Olympic Stadium, referred to as Olympiastadion in both Finnish and Swedish; the host of the 1952 Summer Olympics
- Olympiastadion (Munich), the host of the 1972 Summer Olympics
- Olympia (Helsingborg), sometimes referred to as Olympiastadion
- Jan Breydel Stadium, formerly known as the Olympiastadion

== See also ==
- Olympic Stadium
- Olympia-Stadion (Berlin U-Bahn)
- Berlin Olympiastadion station
