= St. Lucie County Regional History Center =

History museum in Fort Pierce, Florida

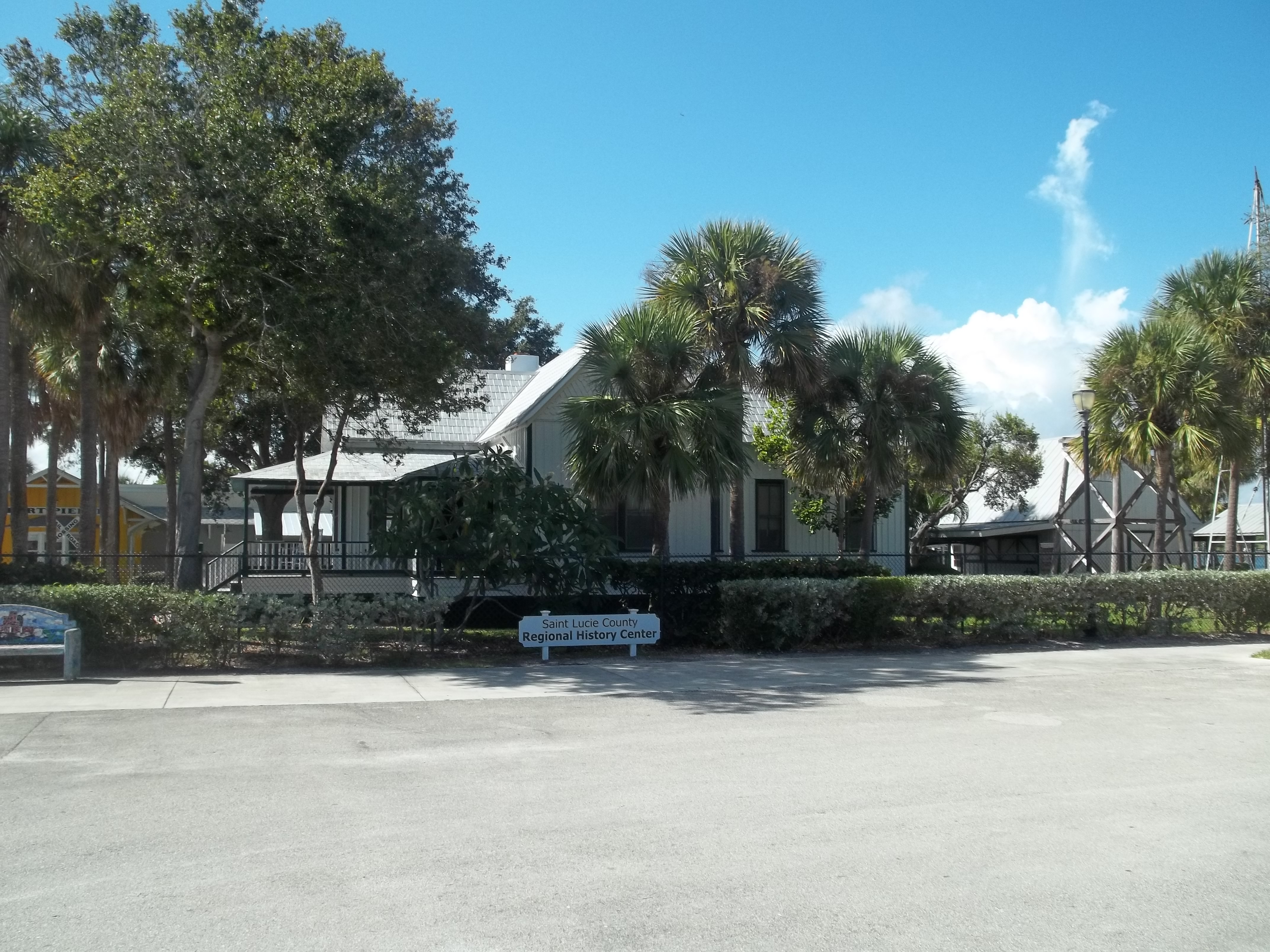

- Location within Florida
- Established: 1968
- Location: 414 Seaway Drive; Fort Pierce, Florida
- Coordinates: 27.455341°N 80.324757°W
- Type: History, Historic House, Library, Military
- Director: John Donlon Brynn Elizabeth Batsche (educator)
- Website: St. Lucie County Regional History Center

The St. Lucie County Regional History Center (formerly known as the St. Lucie County Historical Museum) is located at 414 Seaway Drive, Fort Pierce, Florida. The Museum opened September 17, 1968 under the auspices of the St. Lucie County Historical Commission. In 1988 the supervision of the Museum was transferred to the Leisure Services/Parks and Recreation Department of St. Lucie County. The Museum is currently run by the volunteers of the St. Lucie Historical Society.
