= Ben White (environmentalist) =

Ben White (Benjamin Lewis White, Jr; September 3, 1951 – July 30, 2005) was an arborist, environmentalist, animal rights and Native American rights activist. A 1997 PBS Frontline documentary described him as "a guerrilla warrior against animal exploitation." He was known for the sea turtle costumes used in the 1999 Seattle WTO protests and for documenting illegal whaling in Russia.

White worked with the Sea Shepherd Conservation Society, In Defense of Animals, and the Animal Welfare Institute. He co-founded the Cetacean Freedom Network.

He received the Lifetime Achievement Award from the organization In Defense of Animals.
