= Gretchen Wyler =

American actress (1932–2007)

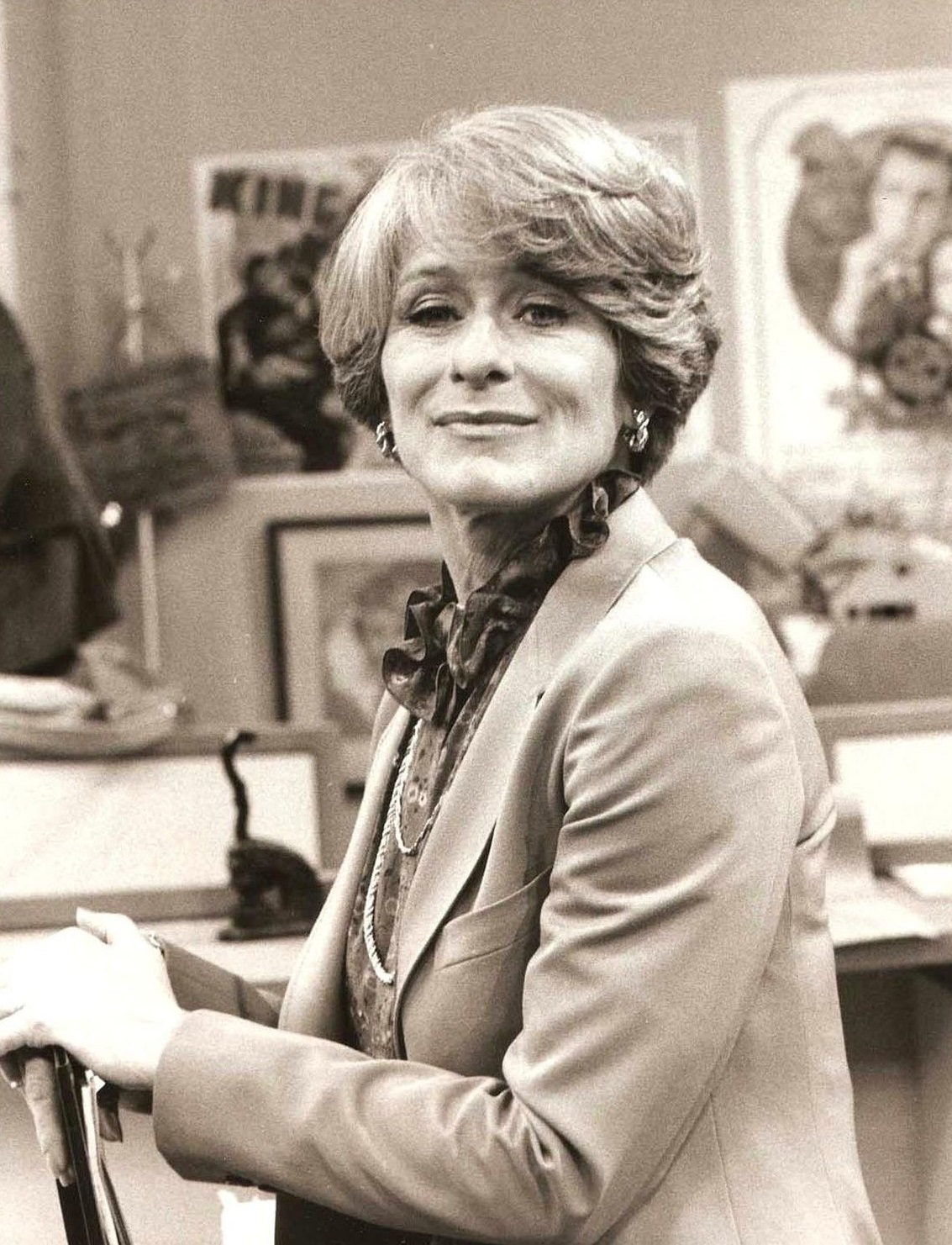
- Wyler in 1977
- Born: Gretchen Patricia Wienecke; February 16, 1932; Oklahoma City, Oklahoma, U.S.
- Died: May 27, 2007 (aged 75); Camarillo, California, U.S.
- Occupations: Actress & Dancer
- Years active: 1950–2002
- Spouse: Shepard Coleman (m. 1956; div. 1968)

Gretchen Wyler (born Gretchen Patricia Wienecke; February 16, 1932 – May 27, 2007) was an American actress and dancer. She was also an animal rights advocate and founder of the Genesis Awards for animal protection.

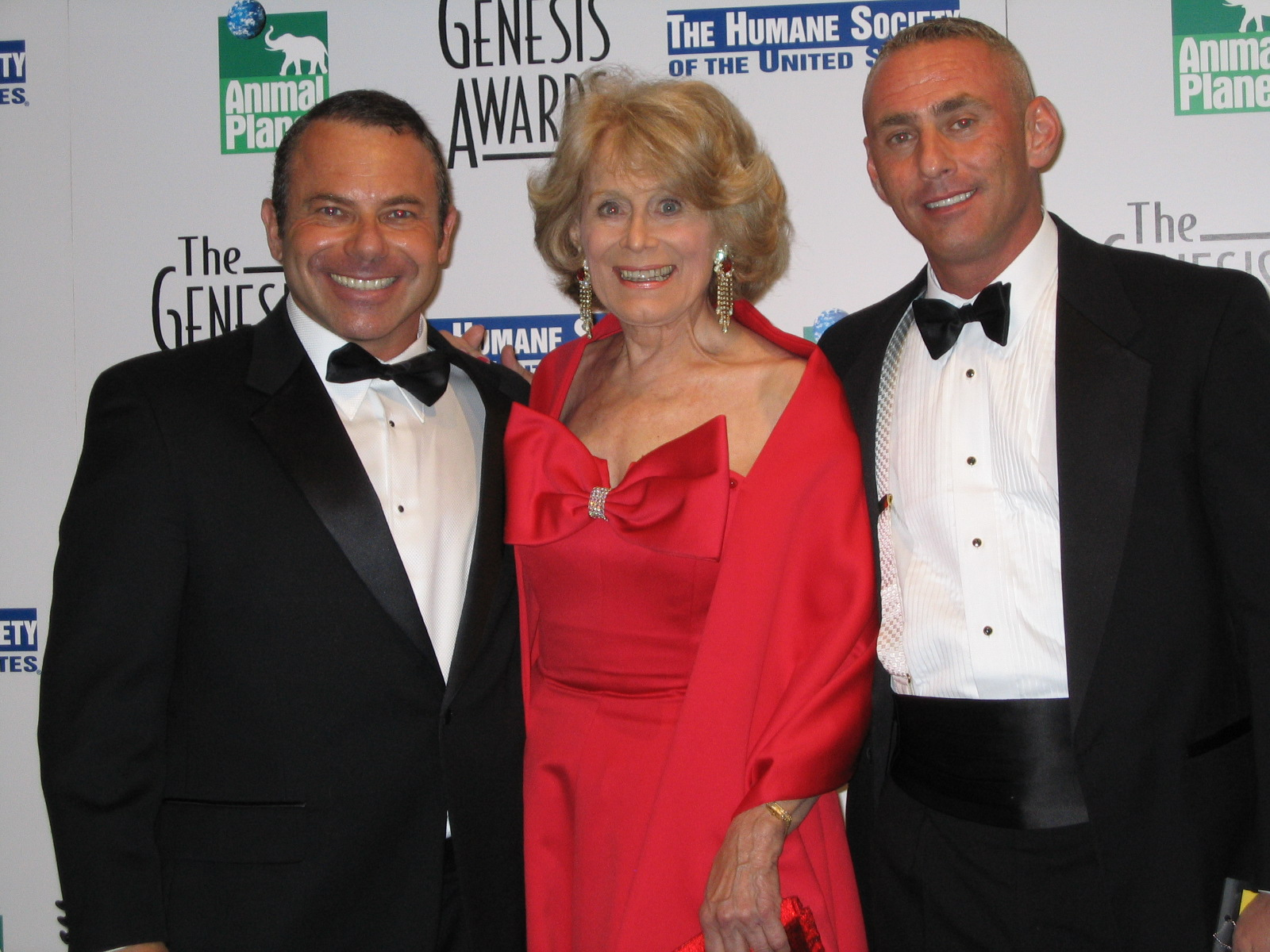
Wyler's last public appearance, at The Beverly Hilton Hotel, attending the 20th Genesis Awards on March 18, 2006.

== Biography ==
=== Early life ===
Wyler was born Gretchen Patricia Wienecke in Oklahoma City, Oklahoma, the daughter of Peggy (née Highley) and Louis Gustave Wienecke, a petroleum engineer. She was raised in Bartlesville, Oklahoma and opened her own dancing school there before going to New York City to pursue a career as a professional actress and dancer.

=== Acting career ===
She appeared on Broadway in six original productions:

- Guys and Dolls as a dancer and as understudy for "Miss Adelaide" (1950–1953)
- Silk Stockings as "Janice Dayton" (1955–1956)
- Damn Yankees as "Lola" as replacement for Gwen Verdon (1955–1957)
- Rumple as "Kate Drew" (1957)
- Bye Bye Birdie as "Rose Grant" as replacement for Chita Rivera (1960–1961)
- Sly Fox as "Miss Fancy" (1976–1978)

She also appeared at the 1964 World's Fair alternating with Chita Rivera in Wonder World. The Michael Kidd/Jule Styne extravaganza played at the outdoor amphitheater. Eventually she went west to Hollywood to pursue movie stardom, which eluded her, but did co-star in the sitcom On Our Own (1977-1978) and appeared on many television programs, ranging from The Phil Silvers Show (aka Sergeant Bilko) to Naked City to Somerset, Diagnosis: Unknown, Charlie's Angels, Dallas, St. Elsewhere, It's a Living, Remington Steele, Falcon Crest, Santa Barbara, Punky Brewster, MacGyver, Who's the Boss, Designing Women, Friends, and Judging Amy. She made a number of appearances as a panelist on the game show To Tell the Truth; her last television appearance was on Chicken Soup for the Soul.

She appeared in Rick McKay's 2004 award-winning feature documentary, Broadway: The Golden Age, by the Legends Who Were There, in which she recounted her "aggressive" nature and an almost Eve Harrington-esque ambition, when she recalled trying on the star (Yvonne Adair)'s outfits when she was merely second understudy in the pre-Broadway touring production of Silk Stockings. When Adair collapsed in the middle of a show one night, and the first understudy (Sherry O'Neil) had surreptitiously gone to New York City to audition for another play (which Wyler knew), Wyler stepped in, and played the role when the show arrived on Broadway. Wyler had already filmed her appearance in McKay's sequel, Broadway: Beyond the Golden Age (2008) before she died.

=== Animal rights activism ===
In 1966, Wyler began to work for animal rights causes after visiting a dilapidated dog shelter in Warwick, N.Y. In 1971, she became the first female to serve on the board of the American Society for the Prevention of Cruelty to Animals (ASPCA) but later fell out with the board. She filed a lawsuit against the board of ASPCA which was settled out of court.

Wyler opposed animal testing and argued that "animals should have the right to run if they have legs, swim if they have fins and fly if they have wings". Wyler became a vegetarian in 1969 for ethical reasons. She was featured on the front cover of The British Vegetarian magazine, published by the Vegetarian Society.

In 1986, she was Vice Chairperson of The Fund for Animals. In 1991, she founded The Ark Trust, presenter of the annual Genesis Awards for animal protection; this event is now a program of The Humane Society of the United States. In 2005, Wyler was inducted into the U.S. Animal Rights Hall of Fame for her dedicated career in animal advocacy. In 2007, the first Gretchen Wyler Award was given to Paul McCartney.

=== Death ===
Wyler died on May 27, 2007, aged 75, from complications of breast cancer.

== Filmography ==
| Year | Title | Role | Notes |
|---|---|---|---|
| 1968 | The Devil's Brigade | The Lady of Joy | |
| 1980 | Private Benjamin | Aunt Kissy | |
| 1991 | The Marrying Man | Gwen | |

== See also ==
- List of animal rights advocates
