= Vegan Outreach =

US-based nonprofit organization

- Founded: 1993; 33 years ago
- Founder: Matt Ball and Jack Norris
- Type: Nonprofit
- Legal status: 501(c)(3)
- Purpose: Veganism and animal advocacy
- Location: Sacramento, California
- Website: veganoutreach.org

Vegan Outreach is a 501(c)(3) nonprofit organization advocating against the exploitation of farmed animals. It was founded in 1993 by Jack Norris and Matt Ball in Cincinnati, Ohio, and was originally named Animal Liberation Action (ALA).

Vegan Outreach's outreach efforts have included street activism, campus leafleting, online vegan transition programs, and food-focused events.

== History ==
As members of the animal rights community of Cincinnati, Matt Ball and Jack Norris spent the winter of 1990–1991 holding fur protests outside cultural events. Their focus turned to vegetarianism in 1992, and the Animal Rights Community of Cincinnati funded the printing and distribution of 10,000 pro-vegetarian flyers titled Vegetarianism. In June 1993, Norris and Ball organized a three-day "Fast for Farm Animals" in front of a Cincinnati slaughterhouse; twelve activists took part. On the last day of the fast, some of the protesters took a large banner reading "Stop Eating Animals" to the University of Cincinnati campus.

Following this event, Ball and Norris formed Animal Liberation Action (ALA) and started a campaign of holding "Stop Eating Animals" banners on street corners. In 1994, ALA developed a booklet called And Justice For All. It promoted a vegan diet, focusing on the abuse of the animals involved. In 1995, ALA's name was officially changed to Vegan Outreach.

== Programs ==
=== College outreach ===
Vegan Outreach has long focused on college outreach, in which staff and volunteers distribute pro-vegan literature on college campuses.

=== 10 Weeks to Vegan ===
Vegan Outreach operates 10 Weeks to Vegan, a program intended to support people interested in transitioning to a vegan diet.

=== Vegan Chef Challenges ===
Vegan Outreach organizes Vegan Chef Challenges, month-long events in which participating restaurants create and promote vegan menu items and members of the public vote for their favorites.

=== Mac Downs ===
Vegan Outreach also organizes Mac Downs, one-day events in which local chefs compete with vegan macaroni-and-cheese dishes for attendees to sample and judge.

=== Green Tuesday ===
In India and Vietnam, Vegan Outreach operates the Green Tuesday Initiative, which works with institutions to promote plant-based meals and reduce animal-product consumption.

=== Food-Planet-Health ===
Vegan Outreach India also conducts Food-Planet-Health outreach sessions and webinars for students about the effects of food choices on animals, health, and the environment.

== See also ==
- List of animal rights groups
- List of vegetarian and vegan organizations
