= In Defense of Animals =

American nonprofit organization

- Formation: 1983; 43 years ago
- Founder: Elliot M. Katz
- Purpose: Animal protection
- Location: San Rafael, California, United States
- Website: www.idausa.org

In Defense of Animals (IDA) is an animal protection organization founded in 1983 in San Rafael, California, United States. The group's slogan is "working to protect the rights, welfare, and habitats of animals".

IDA has become known, in particular, for its campaigns against animal experiments conducted by the U.S. military, and experiments in which baby monkeys are separated from their mothers. Journalist and author Deborah Blum has described its strategy as "pure pit bull. It picks a target carefully and refuses to let go".

== History ==
Elliot M. Katz, a veterinarian, presided over IDA from founding of the organization in 1983 and remained President Emeritus until his death in 2021. Katz was a graduate of Cornell University's School of Veterinary Medicine. He became involved in animal rights issues when his help was sought by activists wanting to end animal experimentation at the allegedly overcrowded and unsanitary laboratories of the University of California, Berkeley. In response, Katz helped set up Californians for Responsible Research, which campaigned for the university to provide better care for the animals.

== Programs and campaigns ==
IDA works for the protection of animals used in scientific research, food and clothing production, entertainment and sport, and other areas. Its early methods included coordinating protests and nonviolent civil disobedience actions including sit-ins, lock downs and banner hangings. Today the organization is led by Marilyn Kroplick M.D. and focuses on pressure campaigns, education, and hands-on animal rescue in Mississippi, South Korea, and India.

Ongoing programs include a campaign to end the dog and cat meat industry in South Korea and a campaign aimed at improving conditions for elephants in zoos and circuses. IDA was one of many animal protection organizations that helped shut down the Coulston Foundation, once the largest chimpanzee research center in the world.

The organisation's other achievements include the following:

- IDA investigator Ben White setting free dolphins off the coast of Japan by swimming underwater to cut the nets held them.
- Campaigning against the hunting of goats and buffalo in Santa Catalina Island, California.
- Creating a chimpanzee sanctuary and education center in Cameroon in 1999.
- Preventing the bow hunting of Tule elk at the Point Reyes National Seashore.
- Ending New York University's crack cocaine experiments on monkeys as part of the Coulston Foundation. In 1995, the US Department of Agriculture backed IDA's claims by accusing the foundation of "keeping several dozen chimpanzees in undersize cages and causing the avoidable deaths of at least five chimpanzees".
- Campaigning against Rockefeller University's neurophysiology experiments on cats. This campaign was supported by PETA. IDA claimed that cats were fully conscious during experiments. The university has denied this. After 18 months of protests by IDA, the university ended the experiments in 1998.
- Ending brain cancer experiments on beagle puppies in 2001 in Phoenix, Arizona, by launching a lawsuit against a scientist.
- Campaigned and eventually convinced the city of San Francisco, California, to have meat-free Mondays.

=== Action against elephants in zoos ===
IDA believes that zoos lead to the premature deaths of elephants and that "urban zoos simply don't have enough space for these magnificent, intelligent animals". IDA's campaign against elephants in zoos is also supported by animal rights group PETA. IDA publishes an annual list of the "10 worst zoos for elephants".

IDA claimed it pressured the San Francisco Zoo to transfer its elephants to a sanctuary in 2004. However, the zoo claimed IDA had "little to do" with the decision to transfer the elephants.

This is part of a wider campaign in which the IDA has claimed a number of American zoos such as the National Zoo in Washington, D.C., have violated the Animal Welfare Act. IDA claims that the US Department of Agriculture has acknowledged "the gravity of concern over the poor conditions for elephants in our nation's zoos" However, Woodland Park Zoo have said in response to IDA that "the limited-space argument is simplistic and ... that elephants in accredited zoos receive the best possible care."

== See also ==
- Animal law
- Animal rights
- Animal welfare
- List of animal rights advocates
- List of animal rights groups
