= List of shipwrecks of Florida =

This is a list of shipwrecks located in and off the coast of Florida.

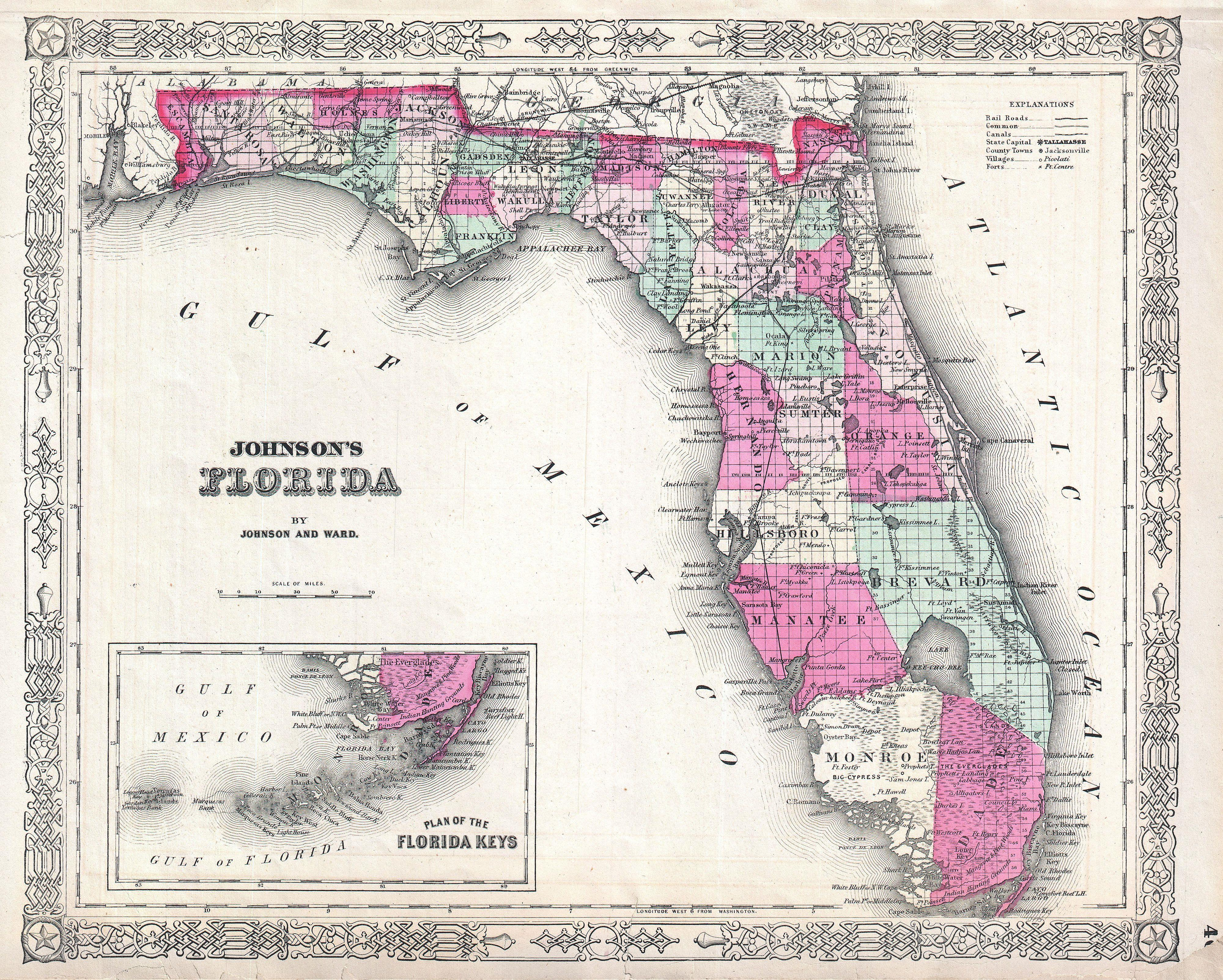
Map of Florida, 1864

== Bay County ==
Ship	Flag	Sunk date	Notes	Coordinates
USCS Belle	United States	1857	A schooner that ran aground off St. Andrews Bay.	
Tarpon	United States	August 30, 1937	A steamship that foundered off Panama City.	30°5′42.12″N 85°56′33.3″W
Vamar	Panama	March 19, 1942	An English ship that sank near Mexico Beach.	29°53′56″N 85°27′48″W

== Brevard County ==
Ship	Flag	Sunk date	Notes	Coordinates
Cities Services Empire		February 22, 1942	A tanker that was torpedoed by the German submarine U-128 off Cape Canaveral in 240 fsw.	
Ocean Venus		May 3, 1942	An Ocean ship that was torpedoed by U-564 12 nautical miles (22 km) east south east of Cape Canaveral, Florida	28°23′N 80°21′W

== Broward County ==
Ship	Flag	Sunk date	Notes	Coordinates
Copenhagen	United Kingdom	1900	A steamship that crashed into a reef at Pompano Beach.	26°12′20″N 80°05′06.46″W
Mercedes I	Venezuela	March 30, 1985	A merchant vessel that was scuttled as an artificial reef off Fort Lauderdale.	

== Charlotte County ==
Ship	Flag	Sunk date	Notes	Coordinates
USS Annie	United States Navy	December 30, 1864	A schooner that sank near Charlotte Harbor.	

== Dixie County ==
Ship	Flag	Sunk date	Notes	Coordinates
City of Hawkinsville	United States	1922	A paddle steamer that was abandoned in the Suwannee River.	29°36′26″N 82°58′15″W

== Duval County ==
Ship	Flag	Sunk date	Notes	Coordinates
Gulfamerica	United States	April 11, 1942	A tanker torpedoed by U-123 off Jacksonville.	30°14′N 81°18′W
Maple Leaf	United States Navy	April 1, 1864	An American Civil War troopship that struck a naval mine near Jacksonville.	30°09′30″N 81°41′12″W

== Escambia County ==
Ship	Flag	Sunk date	Notes	Coordinates
USS Massachusetts	United States Navy	January 1921	An Indiana-class battleship that was sunk as a target for shore batteries off Pensacola.	30°17′49″N 87°18′41″W
USS Oriskany	United States Navy	May 17, 2006	An Essex-class aircraft carrier that was sunk as an artificial reef off Pensacola.	30.042500°N 87.006383°W
USS Preble	United States Navy	April 27, 1863	A sloop-of-war that exploded off Pensacola.	
San Juan	Spain	September 19, 1559	A Spanish galleon that was sunk by a hurricane.	30.34°N 87.23°W

== Franklin County ==
Ship	Flag	Sunk date	Notes	Coordinates
Benjamin C. Cromwell	United States	August 1, 1899	An American schooner that was wrecked and beached in a hurricane on Dog Island.	
Capitola		August 1, 1899	A steamship that was wrecked and beached in a hurricane on Dog Island.	
Cortesia	Italy	August 1, 1899	An Italian barque that was split in half and beached in a hurricane on Dog Island.	
Elsbeth	Norway	August 1, 1899	A Norwegian barque that was wrecked and beached in a hurricane on Dog Island.	
Empire Mica	United Kingdom	June 29, 1942	A British cargo ship torpedoed and sunk by U-67 off the coast of Apalachicola	29°29′N 85°17′W
HMS Fox	Royal Navy	1799	A 14 gun schooner that was sunk off Dog Island.	
Grace Andrews	United States	August 1, 1899	An American schooner that was wrecked and beached in a hurricane on Dog Island.	
Hindoo	Norway	August 1, 1899	A Norwegian barque that was wrecked in a hurricane and beached on Dog Island.	
Iola		August 1, 1899	A steamship that was wrecked and beached in a hurricane on Dog Island.	
James A. Garfield	United States	August 1, 1899	An American barque that was wrecked and beached in a hurricane on Dog Island.	
Jafnhar	Norway	August 1, 1899	A Norwegian barque that was wrecked in a hurricane and beached on Dog Island.	
Latara	Russia	August 1, 1899	A Russian barque that was wrecked in a hurricane and beached on Dog Island.	
Le Tigre		February 16, 1766	A merchant vessel that was stranded on Dog Island during a hurricane.	
Mary E. Morse	United States	August 1, 1899	An American schooner was wrecked in a hurricane and beached on Dog Island.	
Ranavola	Norway	August 1, 1899	A Norwegian barque that was destroyed in a hurricane at Dog Island.	
Vale	Norway	August 1, 1899	A Norwegian barque that was wrecked and beached in a hurricane on Dog Island.	
Vidette	United States	August 1, 1899	An American brigantine that was wrecked and beached in a hurricane on Dog Island.	
Warren Adams	United States	August 1, 1899	An American schooner that was wrecked and beached in a hurricane on Dog Island.	

== Hillsborough County ==
Ship	Flag	Sunk date	Notes	Coordinates
USS Narcissus	United States Navy	January 4, 1866	A steamboat that sank off Egmont Key.	

== Indian River County ==
Ship	Flag	Sunk date	Notes	Coordinates
Breconshire	United Kingdom	April 29, 1894	A British steamship en route from New York City to Tampa that ran aground and sank one-quarter mile (0.40 km) off Vero Beach in 15 to 20 feet (4.6 to 6.1 m) of water.	27°39′8.86″N 80°21′3.5″W

== Manatee County ==
Ship	Flag	Sunk date	Notes	Coordinates
Bessie Whiting		January 11, 1918	A schooner that ran aground off Perico Island.	
Doc's Barge		Unknown	A barge that sunk in 65 feet (20 m) of water roughly 18 miles (29 km) from Longboat Pass. Little to nothing is known about the vessel.	
Fin Barge		Unknown	Little to nothing is known about the vessel. It sank in 85 feet (26 m) of water, 25 miles (40 km) from shore	
Nohab (Lensahn III)	Germany	1934	The former steam yacht of Friedrich Augustus II, Grand Duke of Oldenburg (1852-1931). In September 1926, while in Biscayne Bay, the ship was damaged by a hurricane and five of the seven crew died, including the captain. She was towed to the Port of Miami by tugs. In 1928, she was moved to Tampa Bay but she was not repaired and she sank in 1934. Her hulk was towed 15 nautical miles (28 km) out to sea and abandoned to sink. The location of her wreck was forgotten and only rediscovered in 2007.	27°26′45″N 82°59′59″W
Regina		1940	A tanker that sank near Bradenton Beach.	27°28′08″N 82°42′07″W

== Martin County ==
Ship	Flag	Sunk date	Notes	Coordinates
Georges Valentine	Italy	October 16, 1904	A barquentine that sank in a storm off Hutchinson Island.	27°11′55.8″N 80°9′49.8″W
USS Muliphen	United States Navy	January 21, 1989	An Andromeda-class attack cargo ship that was sunk as an artificial reef off Stuart.	27°24.331′N 80°00.337′W
USS Rankin	United States Navy	July 24, 1988	A Tolland-class attack cargo ship that was sunk as a fishing and diving reef off Stuart.	

== Miami-Dade County ==
Ship	Flag	Sunk date	Notes	Coordinates
Arratoon Apcar	United Kingdom	February 20, 1878	A freighter that struck the reef where the Fowey Rocks Lighthouse was under construction.	25.590283°N 80.096667°W
Bud Krohn	Spain	December 3, 1989	A Spanish cargo ship that was sunk as an artificial reef.	
HMS Fowey	Royal Navy	June 26, 1748	A warship that struck a reef offshore from Biscayne Bay.	
Half Moon	United States	1930	A German racing yacht that ended its life as a floating restaurant and dance hall off Miami, where it sank near Key Biscayne.	25°43′39″N 80°8′4″W
Ingrid	Norway	April 18, 1895	A Norwegian barque carrying lumber on a trip from Pensacola to Rio de Janeiro that was wrecked on the Fowey Rocks.	
Potrero del Llano	Mexico	May 14, 1942	An oil tanker that was torpedoed by U-564.	25°35′N 80°06′W

== Monroe County ==
Ship	Flag	Sunk date	Notes	Coordinates
Adelaide Baker			A bark that ran aground on a reef off Duck Key.	
Adolphus Busch	United Kingdom	September 24, 1998	A cargo ship that was sunk as an artificial reef off Looe Key.	24.5307°N 81.4615°W
USS Alligator	United States Navy	November 23, 1822	A schooner that ran aground on Alligator Reef.	
USS Amesbury	United States Navy	1962	A Buckley-class destroyer escort that sank under tow off Key West.	
Angustias	Spain	1733	A ship in the 1733 Spanish Plate Fleet that was wrecked along the Florida Keys.	24°47.16′N 80°51.31′W
Benwood	Norway	April 9, 1942	A cargo ship that collided with Robert C. Tuttle off Key Largo.	
USCGC Bibb	United States Coast Guard	November 28, 1987	A Treasury-class cutter that was sunk as artificial reef off Key Largo.	24°59.71′N 80°22.77′W
Chavez	Spain	1733	A ship in the 1733 Spanish Plate Fleet that was wrecked along the Florida Keys.	
City of Washington	United States	July 10, 1917	A steamship that ran aground off Key Largo.	
USS Coco	United States Navy	September 9, 1919	A patrol vessel that was wrecked at Key West in the 1919 Florida Keys hurricane.	
USS Curb	United States Navy	November 23, 1983	A Diver-class rescue and salvage ship that sank off Key West as an artificial reef in 185 fsw.	
USCGC Duane	United States Coast Guard	November 27, 1987	A Treasury-class cutter that was sunk as an artificial reef near Key Largo.	25°00′25.98″N 80°20′47.22″W
Eagle		December 19, 1985	A cargo ship that was sunk as an artificial reef off Florida Keys after heavy fire damage.	24°52′11″N 80°34′13″W
El Gallo Indiano	Spain	1733	A ship in the 1733 Spanish Plate Fleet that was wrecked along the Florida Keys.	
El Infante	Spain	1733	A ship in the 1733 Spanish Plate Fleet that was wrecked along the Florida Keys.	
El Rubi	Spain	1733	A ship in the 1733 Spanish Plate Fleet that was wrecked along the Florida Keys.	
USS Fred T. Berry	United States Navy	May 14, 1972	A Gearing-class destroyer that was scuttled off Key West as an artificial reef. In 1973, the research submersible Johnson Sea Link became entangled in the wreckage, resulting in the deaths of two of its occupants.	24°27.8′N 81°33.3′W
Guerrero	Spain	December 19, 1827	A Spanish-Cuban slave ship that wrecked on a reef in the Florida Keys after a running gun battle with a Royal Navy anti-slavery patrol ship.	
USS Helena I	United States Navy	September 11, 1919	A yacht that was wrecked off Key West in the 1919 Florida Keys hurricane.	
Henrietta Marie	England	1700	A slave ship sunk off Florida Keys.	
Herrera	Spain	1733	A ship in the 1733 Spanish Plate Fleet that was wrecked along the Florida Keys.	
Isaac Allerton	United States	August 28, 1856	A merchant ship that sank in a hurricane off the Saddlebunch Keys.	
USS Katherine K.	United States Navy	September 10, 1919	A patrol vessel that was wrecked off Key West in the 1919 Florida Keys hurricane.	
USS Kendrick	United States Navy	After 1966	A Benson-class destroyer that was sunk off Key West in tests, in 320 fsw.	
HMS Looe	Royal Navy	February 5, 1744	A frigate that ran aground off Big Pine Key during the War of Jenkins' Ear.	24.5477°N 81.4052°W
Major General Wallace F. Randolph	United States	March 6, 1986	Renamed Thunderbolt. A mine planter that was sunk as an artificial reef off Marathon.	
USS Morris	United States Navy	October 11, 1846	A schooner that was wrecked off Key West in a hurricane.	
USS Nemes	United States Navy	August 21, 1917	A patrol vessel that exploded off Key West.	
Nuestra Señora de Atocha	Spain	September 6, 1622	A Spanish galleon that sank 40 miles (64 km) off the coast of Key West. The wreck was found on July 20, 1985, by treasure hunters, who soon began to raise $400 million in coins and silver.	
Nuestra Señora del Populo	Spain	1733	A ship in the 1733 Spanish Plate Fleet that was wrecked along the Florida Keys.	
USS Patrol No. 1	United States Navy	September 10, 1919	A patrol vessel that was wrecked off Key West in the 1919 Florida Keys hurricane.	
Queen of Nassau	United States	July 2, 1926	A patrol boat that flooded and sank off Islammorada.	
USS R-12	United States Navy	June 12, 1943	An R-class submarine that foundered south of the Florida Keys.	24°24′30″N 81°38′30″W
USS S-16	United States Navy	April 3, 1945	An S-class submarine that was sunk off Key West as a target, in 260 fsw.	24°25.207′N 82°02.393′W
San Felipe	Spain	1733	A ship in the 1733 Spanish Plate Fleet that was wrecked along the Florida Keys.	24°50′45.66″N 80°42′51″W
San Francisco	Spain	1733	A ship in the 1733 Spanish Plate Fleet that was wrecked along the Florida Keys.	
San Jose	Spain	1733	A ship in the 1733 Spanish Plate Fleet that was wrecked along the Florida Keys.	24°56′55″N 80°29′20″W
San Pedro	Spain	1733	A ship in the 1733 Spanish Plate Fleet that was wrecked along the Florida Keys.	
Santa Margarita	Spain	1622	A Spanish ship that sank in a hurricane off Key West.	
USS Saufley	United States Navy	February 20, 1968	A Fletcher-class destroyer that was sunk as a target in 420 fsw off Key West.	
USS Sea Hawk	United States Navy	September 10, 1919	A patrol boat that was wrecked off Key West in the 1919 Florida Keys hurricane.	
USS Spiegel Grove	United States Navy	May 17, 2002	A Thomaston-class dock landing ship that was sunk as an artificial reef off Florida Keys.	25°04′00.2″N 80°18′00.7″W
USS St. Sebastian	United States Navy	September 9, 1919	A patrol vessel that was wrecked at Key West in the 1919 Florida Keys hurricane.	
USS Sturtevant	United States Navy	April 26, 1942	A Clemson-class destroyer that ran into a friendly mine-field in the northwest channel.	24°45′N 82°1′W
USS Sylvia	United States Navy	September 9, 1919	A patrol vessel that was wrecked at Key West in the 1919 Florida Keys hurricane.	
Sueco de Arizon	Spain	1733	A ship in the 1733 Spanish Plate Fleet that was wrecked along the Florida Keys.	
Tres Puentes	Spain	1733	A ship in the 1733 Spanish Plate Fleet that was wrecked along the Florida Keys.	
HMS Tyger	Royal Navy	January 11, 1741	A frigate that ran aground on a reef in the Dry Tortugas.	
U-2513	United States Navy	October 7, 1951	A Type XXI U-boat that was sunk west of Key West during rocket tests by the destroyer USS Robert A. Owens.	24°52.015′N 83°18.594′W
Valbanera	Spain	September 1919	A steamship that sank in a hurricane 5 miles (8.0 km) east of Rebecca Shoal (about 45 miles (72 km) west of Key West).	
USS Wilkes-Barre	United States Navy	May 12, 1972	A Cleveland-class light cruiser that was sunk as a target off the Florida Keys.	24.6101°N 81.7630°W

== Okaloosa County ==
Ship	Flag	Sunk date	Notes	Coordinates
USS Ozark	United States Navy	1981	A Catskill-class amphibious assault ship that was sunk as a target off Destin.	
USS Zephyr (PC-8)	United States Navy	23 March 2026	A Cyclone-class coastal patrol boat that was scuttled off Destin.	
USS Shamal (PC-13)	United States Navy	21 March 2026	A Cyclone-class coastal patrol boat that was sunk as a target off Destin.	
Cyclops	United States	18 April 2023	An offshore supply vessel that was scutttled off Okaloosa County, Florida.	
Miss Louise	United States	1997	A push tugboat down 60' near Destin pass off Okaloosa County, Florida.	
Manta	United States	January 2023	A 190' oil exploration vessel 16 miles off Okaloosa County, Florida.	
Big Dawg (PL-94)	United States	May 2021	A 93' Air Force Parachute Water Survival School training vessel out of NAS Pensacola.	
MV FANTASEA	United States	February 2024	A 144' retired casino boat sunk off the coast of Destin-Fort Walton Beach.	30°14′23″N 86°30′18″W
SS United States	United States	11 November 2026	Largest and fastest US-built ocean liner that was scutttled off Okaloosa County, Florida.	

== Palm Beach County ==
Ship	Flag	Sunk date	Notes	Coordinates
Amaryllis	Panama	August 22, 1968	A cargo ship that ran aground at Singer Island on September 7, 1965, during Hurricane Betsy. After several salvage attempts, the ship was abandoned and became a tourist attraction. Eventually, the Army Corps of Engineers succeeded in towing the ship three-quarters mile (1.2 km) out to sea, where she was scuttled as an artificial reef.	26°47′17″N 80°00′58″W
Inverrosa	United Kingdom	May 8, 1968	An ore carrier ran aground off Boca Raton. She was refloated on May 23, subsequently laid up and scrapped.	26°19′29.9″N 80°04′25.2″W
Inchulva	United Kingdom	September 11, 1903	A British Steamship that ran aground and sank off Delray Beach in a hurricane.	26°27′12″N 80°03′22″W
Lofthus	Norway	1898	A barque that sank near Boynton Beach.	26°33′46″N 80°02′18″W
Lubrafol	Panama	May 9, 1942	A Panamanian tanker that sunk after being torpedoed by U-564.	26°26′N 80°00′W|-
Ohioan	United States	May 8, 1942	A cargo ship that was sunk off Boynton Beach by U-564.	26°31′N 79°59′W

== Pinellas County ==
Ship	Flag	Sunk date	Notes	Coordinates
USCGC Blackthorn	United States Coast Guard	January 28, 1980	A USCG seagoing buoy tender that collided with the tanker Capricorn in Tampa Bay, in the Egmont channel. The wreck was raised and re-sunk 20 mi (32 km) off Clearwater.	

== Sarasota County ==
Ship	Flag	Sunk date	Notes	Coordinates
Antonio Ensenat	Cuba	November 1, 1943	A Cuban schooner that sank after colliding with a Honduran schooner bow to bow on November 1, 1943.	27°05.12′N 82°41.00′W
Bay Ronto	United Kingdom	September 13, 1919	A British freighter that sank during a hurricane.	26°45.751′N 82°50.862′W
Zalophus	United States	February 4, 1930	A private yacht that was owned by John Ringling and sank after hitting an uncharted metallic object 1 mile (1.6 km) off Lido Key. New York Mayor Jimmy Walker and his mistress Bettie Crompton were notably onboard.	

== St. Johns County ==
Ship	Flag	Sunk date	Notes	Coordinates
USS Basilone	United States Navy	April 9, 1982	A Gearing-class destroyer that was sunk as a target off St. Augustine.	
Industry	Great Britain	May 6, 1764	A British supply sloop en route from New York, wrecked off St. Augustine Light.	
USC&GS Isis	United States	January 1920	A survey ship that was wrecked off Crescent Beach.	29.77212°N 81.22192°W

== St. Lucie County ==
Ship	Flag	Sunk date	Notes	Coordinates
Amazone		May 6, 1942	A cargo ship that was torpedoed off of Fort Pierce by U-333.	27°21′N 80°04′W
Halsey		May 6, 1942	A cargo ship that was torpedoed off St. Lucie Inlet by U-333.	27°14′N 80°03′W
Urca de Lima	Spain	1715	A Spanish ship, and part of the 1715 Treasure Fleet, that sank near Fort Pierce	27°30′19″N 80°17′57″W

== Tampa Bay ==
Ship	Flag	Sunk date	Notes	Coordinates
A.B. Noyes	United States	October 16, 1863	A Union barge that was captured and burned by Confederates near Fort Brooke Fort Brooke	27°30′19″N 80°17′57″W

== Volusia County ==
Ship	Flag	Sunk date	Notes	Coordinates
Commodore	United States	January 2, 1897	A steamboat that foundered off Ponce de Leon Inlet Light. Stephen Crane, a passenger on the ship, was stranded for thirty hours in a dingy, and based his story "The Open Boat" on the experience.	
USS Mindanao	United States Navy	1980	A Luzon-class auxiliary ship that was sunk as an artificial reef off Daytona Beach.	29°12.00′N 80°44.87′W
Nathan F. Cobb	United States	December 1, 1896	A schooner that ran aground off Ormond Beach.	
