= Maritime history of Florida =

History of waters in and adjacent to Florida

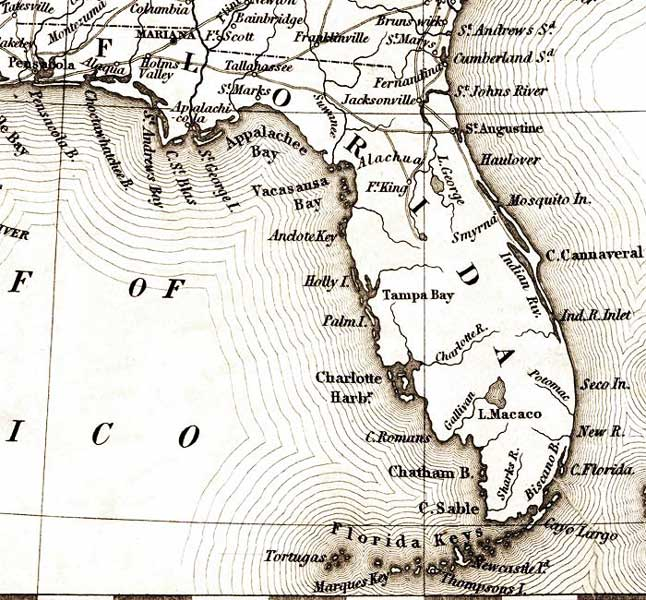
Map of Florida, 1835

The maritime history of Florida describes significant past events relating to the U.S. state of Florida in areas concerning shipping, shipwrecks, and military installations and lighthouses constructed to protect or aid navigation and development of the Florida peninsula.

A long and flat peninsula surrounded by the Gulf of Mexico, the Florida Straits and the Atlantic Ocean, Florida has a lengthy maritime history. The size and shape of Florida, along with its natural features like reefs, shoals, water depth, currents, locations of rivers and inlets and the weather, have affected where people lived and where vessels wrecked. Due to the presence of mangrove forests and other natural features which dampen waves and provide suitable transport routes, Florida has favorable natural harbors, resulting in the state having become an international maritime crossroads.

Humans have inhabited Florida for at least twelve thousand years. The earliest inhabitants would not recognize their home today, because the sea level is twenty to fifty fathoms higher and has covered nearly half of the Florida peninsula. Many people lived near springs and sinkholes and along rivers and near the coasts in areas like present-day Timucuan Ecological and Historic Preserve, relying on fresh and saltwater fish and shellfish as important parts of their diet. The archeological remains at some of the earliest places they lived now are underwater and on the bottom of rivers and springs and offshore on the continental shelf.

From at least six thousand years ago, the native people of Florida traveled the waterways and coasts by canoe, facilitating communication and trade among the tribes. About three hundred prehistoric canoes have been found in more than two hundred sites in Florida.

== European exploration ==
In the late 15th and early 16th centuries, looking for a faster way to Asia by sea, European explorers sailed west and ran into the Americas. Seeing new resources to exploit, people to convert and lands to claim, the Spanish, the French and the English sent militaries, missionaries and colonists to establish a foothold and expand their areas of control. The first evidence of a European encounter in Florida is the arrival of Spaniard Juan Ponce de León in the vicinity of present-day St. Augustine in 1513. Ponce de León named the land "La Florida" and attempted to circumnavigate what he thought was an island, sailing south to the Keys, naming a cluster of islands "Las Tortugas" and sailing north to present-day Tampa.

Ponce de León was followed by fellow Spaniard Pánfilo de Narváez who landed near Tampa Bay in 1528 and proceeded north to the area now known as Apalachee. Only four members of the Narváez expedition survived, including Álvar Núñez Cabeza de Vaca, who wrote an account of their travels. A fifth member of the expedition, Juan Ortiz lived as a slave in the Tampa Bay area for nearly twelve years before being rescued in 1539 by Hernando de Soto. He landed in Tampa Bay with nine ships and over 600 soldiers. He spent five months around what is today Tallahassee, and his explorations of southern North America are commemorated at De Soto National Memorial. In 1559, Spaniard Don Tristán de Luna y Arellano established a short-lived colony at Pensacola Bay but lost all except three of his supply ships to a hurricane. He sailed away after two years, a broken and beaten man. The Emanuel Point shipwreck site discovered in 1992 by the Florida Bureau of Archaeological Research is believed to be one of his lost ships.

In 1562, the French sent Jean Ribaut to the New World intending to found a Huguenot colony. His expedition first arrived in Florida, and marked a spot on the St. Johns River for future settlement and then headed north to establish Charlesfort in present-day Parris Island, South Carolina. The colony failed, and in 1564, René Goulaine de Laudonnière led the settlers back to Florida and established Fort Caroline in what is now Jacksonville.

In 1565, Spaniard Pedro Menéndez de Avilés captured Fort Caroline in a brutal fight with the French and established St. Augustine, the first permanent European colony in the continental United States. In 1568, Frenchman Dominique de Gourgues recaptured Fort Caroline. In 1569, the Spanish built a watchtower at Matanzas Inlet to watch the horizon and warn St. Augustine of approaching ships, a strategy that failed them in 1586, when English privateer Sir Francis Drake attacked and looted St. Augustine. The French effort to establish a colony in Florida is memorialized today at Fort Caroline National Memorial. St. Augustine, which had aids-to-navigation (wooden watchtowers which may have been lit at night) established as early as the 1580s, and saw ships come and go on an annual basis through the present day, is considered the nation's oldest port.

From the late 16th through the 18th centuries, the Spanish sent annual convoys of merchant and military escort vessels from Cuba to Spain. Referred to as the Spanish plate fleets, the ships carried gold, silver and gemstones from the mines of Mexico and Peru, and porcelains, silks, pearls, spices and other highly sought goods from Asia that reached the Americas via the Spanish Manila Galleon fleet that crossed the Pacific.

The homeward bound Spanish plate fleets followed the Gulf Stream through the Straits of Florida and up the coast of North America before heading east for the Azores and Spain. The Spanish built Castillo de San Marcos and other coastal forts and settlements in Florida to provide protection from French and British raiders and pirates, and assist in saving survivors and salvaging cargoes from vessels that wrecked along Florida's shores as a result of hurricanes and mishaps.

== 17th and 18th centuries ==
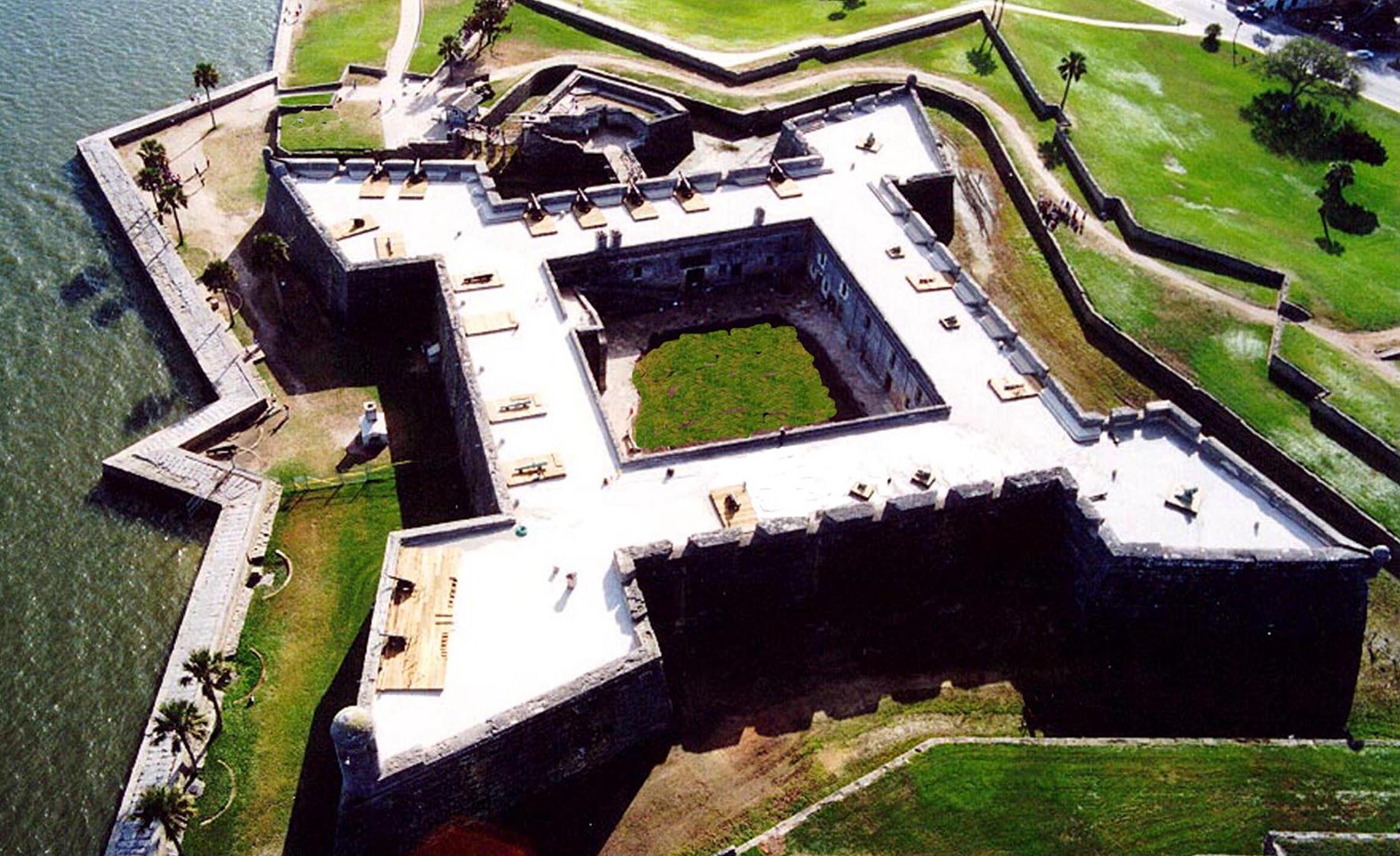
The Castillo de San Marcos in St. Augustine—construction started in 1672 and was completed 23 years later

Over the years, many Spanish ships were lost off the Florida coast with the greatest disasters suffered by the fleets of 1622, 1715 and 1733. In 1622, eight ships were lost in a hurricane as they entered the Florida straits. During the 20th century, the remains of a number of lost ships have been found, including Nuestra Señora de Atocha from the 1622 fleet, Urca de Lima from the 1715 fleet and San Pedro from the 1733 fleet.

Eleven Spanish galleons were lost in the hurricane of 1715, wrecking on the shallow reefs between Sebastian Inlet and Fort Pierce. More than seven hundred men perished in the storm, including the Spanish Commander. The McLarty Treasure Museum at the southern end of Sebastian Inlet State Recreation Area takes an in-depth look at the history surrounding this disaster. The 11 lost ships were part of the Spanish Plate Fleet. The Mel Fisher Maritime Heritage Society Museum in Key West has displays of treasure and other artifacts from Nuestra Señora de Atocha and Santa Margarita, which was lost in 1622.

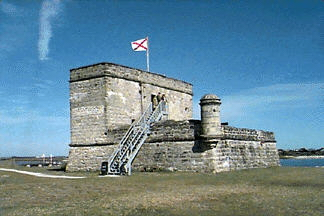
Fort Matanzas—view of fort's western and southern facades.

During the 17th and 18th centuries, the Spanish, French and English continued to fight over territory and religion in Florida. The British in Georgia and South Carolina attempted to push southward and the French moved eastward along the Gulf Coast from the Mississippi River valley. The Spanish relied not only on Castillo de San Marcos to protect St. Augustine, but began construction of Fort Matanzas in 1740 for additional protection from the south.

During the War of Jenkins' Ear (1739 through 1748) between Spain and Great Britain, the Royal Navy patrolled the Caribbean and the North American coastline. One ship that was lost during this time was HMS Fowey, the wreck of which is located within the boundaries of Biscayne National Park and which has been extensively studied by the National Park Service and Florida State University. In 1763, under the Treaty of Paris, Spain gave Britain control of Florida in exchange for Havana, Cuba, which the British had captured during the Seven Years' War (1756 through 1763). That same year, the British built a fort overlooking the entrance to Pensacola Bay. Almost the entire population of St. Augustine moved to Cuba at the end of the war.

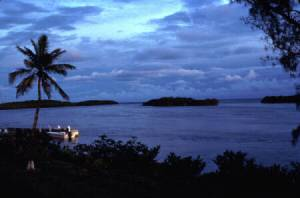
Biscayne National Park, home to HMS Fowey

Spain captured Pensacola in 1781 and regained control of the rest of Florida in 1783, when Britain gave Florida to Spain in exchange for the Bahamas and Gibraltar. Around 1797, Spain built two forts at Pensacola Bay in the vicinity of the earlier British fort. Little physical evidence of these forts remains but what does remain is preserved at Gulf Islands National Seashore.

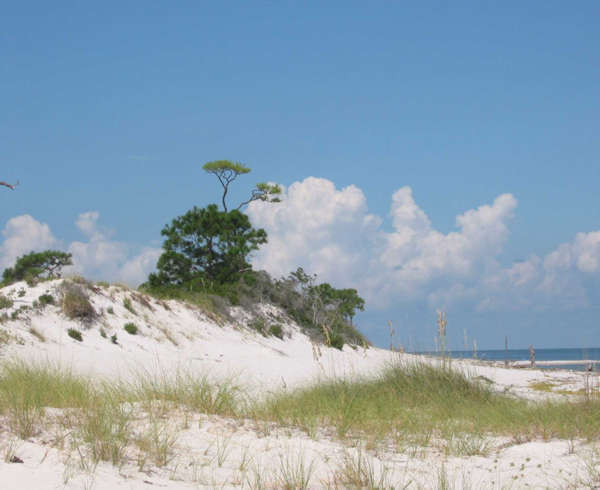
Gulf Islands National Seashore, near Pensacola

Although Britain's control of Florida was brief, its effect on the economy and settlement was substantial. As the British population increased and slaves were brought in, colonial plantations and other industries sprouted and flourished, exporting their products to other British colonies and trading illegally with Spanish Louisiana and Mexico. This was made possible because surveyors mapped the landscape, land grants were given out, the first road was built and a packet system of shipping by rivers and along the coasts was introduced. This economic prosperity and maritime trade continued after Britain ceded Florida to Spain, with exports to neighboring Gulf Coast and Eastern seaboard areas, the Northeast and as far away as Europe.

It was during Florida's second Spanish period that folklore claims that shipping in the Gulf of Mexico was ravaged by the pirate José Gaspar (also known as Gasparilla) from his "regal" base in Charlotte Harbor. Though Gaspar is a well-known figure along Florida's Gulf coast and is celebrated at Tampa's annual Gasparilla Pirate Festival, there is no archival or physical evidence that he ever existed.

== 19th and 20th centuries ==
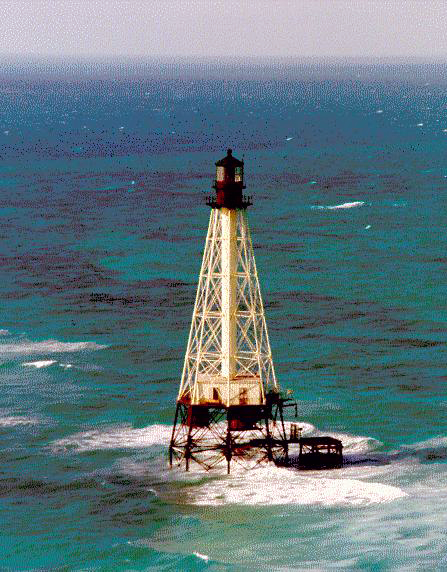
Alligator Reef Lighthouse, east of Indian Key. Completed on November 25, 1873, it became automated in 1963

Spain ceded Florida to the United States as part of the Adams–Onís Treaty of 1819, and Florida became a U.S. territory in 1821. Coastal trade with other markets continued to expand and towns like Jacksonville, Pensacola and Tampa became important ports. After becoming a U.S. territory, the federal government began building a series of lighthouses as aids to navigation along the coasts of Florida to mark dangerous headlands, shoals, bars and reefs.

Florida's first coastal navigational aid was a 1586 Spanish watchtower at St. Augustine, but the first true lighthouse was a seventy three-foot harbor light built there in 1824. Masonry towers proved vulnerable to storms and erosion—the lighthouse built in Key West in 1825 and the lighthouse built in 1827 on Sand Key, near Key West, both collapsed in an 1846 hurricane, killing a total of twenty people who had sought refuge in the two towers. Other Florida lighthouses had to be abandoned or moved when the sand around their foundations washed away. Information about historic lighthouses in Florida has been recorded by the National Park Service in its Inventory of Historic Light Stations and by the United States Coast Guard (see List of the 1733 Spanish Plate Fleet Shipwrecks). As large parts of the Florida coast remained unprotected by lighthouses until late in the 19th century, ships frequently wrecked along coast, particularly along the Florida Keys, where for a while wrecking made Key West the largest and richest city in Florida.

The U.S. Navy has played a prominent role in Florida's maritime history. In the 1820s, the U.S. Navy was called upon to protect ships off Florida's coasts from pirates that plagued merchant ships in the Caribbean. One of the patrol ships was USS Alligator, lost near Islamorada while escorting a merchant convoy.

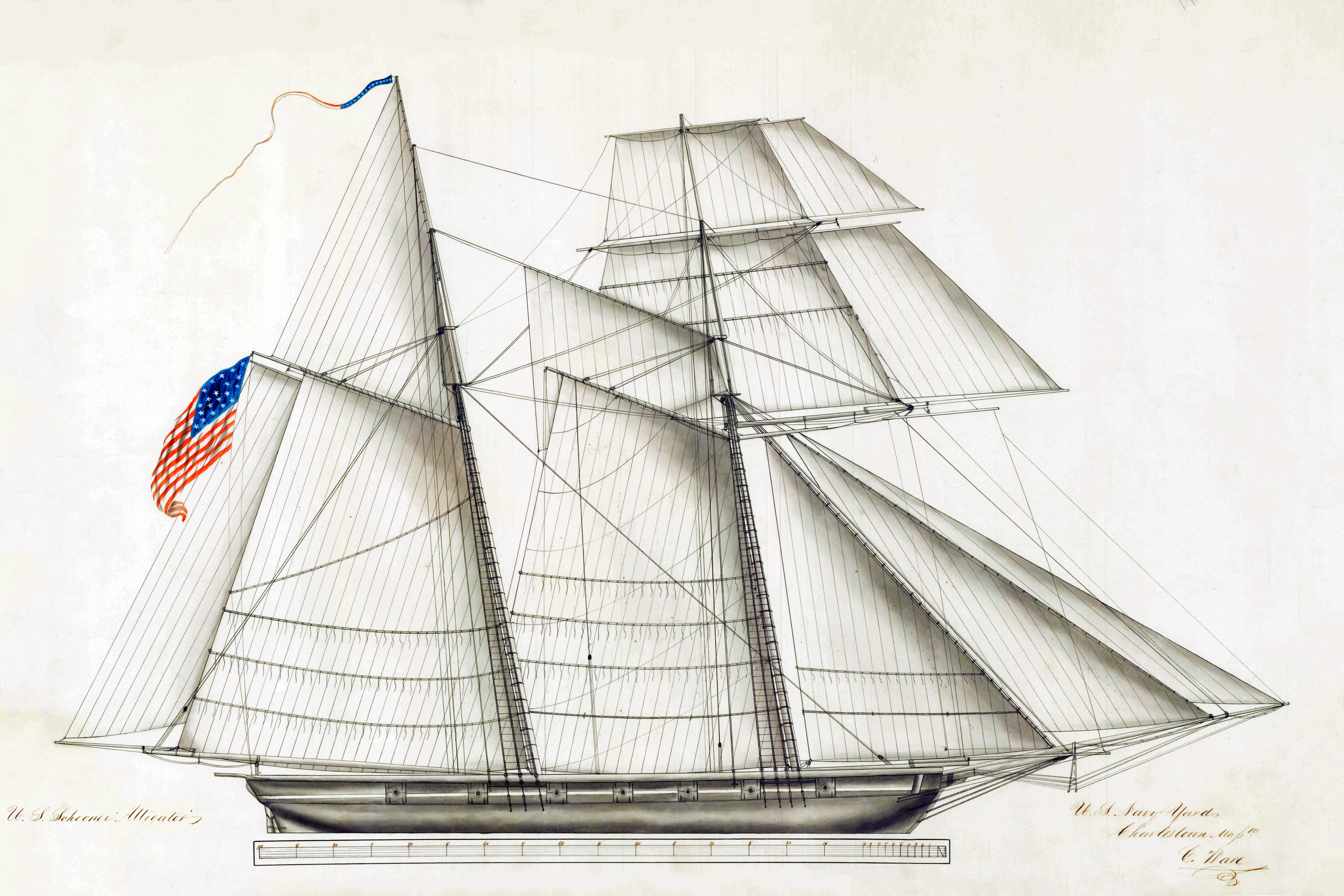
Artist illustration of USS Alligator, which ran aground on a reef near Islamorada on November 18, 1822

In 1826, construction began on the Pensacola Navy Yard and four forts to defend it. What remains of Fort Pickens, Fort Barrancas and Fort McRee, which were built overlooking Pensacola Bay in the vicinity of the earlier British and Spanish forts, is preserved today within Gulf Islands National Seashore.

Near the end of the 19th century, and as a result of the Spanish–American War, Tampa and other Florida ports became staging areas for tens of thousands of U.S. troops and supplies headed to Cuba. With the advent of crewed controlled flight and the building of aircraft carriers and seaplanes, an aviation training station was established by the U.S. Navy at Pensacola in 1913 and another in Jacksonville in 1940.

Following statehood in 1845, Florida's economy became stronger and the principal ports shipped vast quantities of citrus, cotton, lumber and other products to the Atlantic states, the Caribbean and Europe. The Federal government began construction of coastal forts including Fort Taylor in Key West and Fort Jefferson on Garden Key in the Dry Tortugas to better control navigation through the Florida Straits. Although Fort Jefferson was never finished, construction continued for 30 years, and vast quantities of bricks were shipped to the key in flat-bottomed steamboats like that found at the Bird Key wreck, which was lost while transporting bricks.

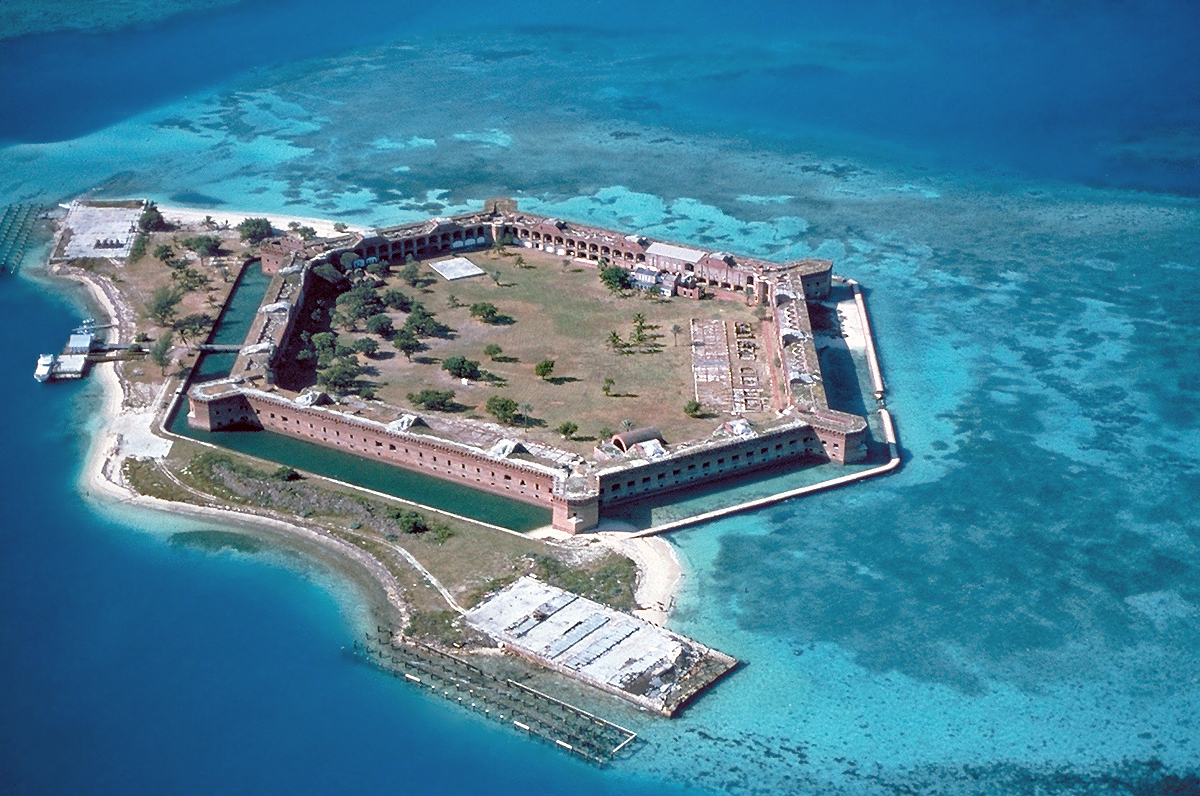
Fort Jefferson on Garden Key, set aside as a national monument by President Franklin Roosevelt in 1935, and redesignated as Dry Tortugas National Park in 1992

Florida seceded from the Union in 1861 and joined the Confederacy. During the Civil War, Florida's ports were blockaded by the Union and blockade runners delivered supplies needed by the Confederacy in exchange for Florida products. Although there were some vessel casualties on both sides, the major naval battles took place in states north of Florida. One unfortunate casualty in Florida waters was the Union transport ship Maple Leaf that struck a Confederate mine.

After the Civil War, tenant farmers and sharecroppers took over plantation lands, and agriculture, cattle ranching, lumber, manufacturing and extractive industries like phosphate mining became important, prompting improvements in transportation. Railroads expanded across the state connecting the ports and the interior, and steamboats like City of Hawkinsville, SS Tarpon and SS Copenhagen began providing regular passenger and freight service on inland waterways like the St. Johns River and ocean service to international destinations. Tourism flourished with steamboat tours and hotels near rail lines. In 1900, during the daytime, SS Copenhagen was heading south close to the Florida coast—to avoid the northerly Gulf Stream current—when it suddenly crashed into a reef offshore of present-day Pompano Beach at full speed. In 1994, the remains became the fifth Underwater Archaeological Preserve in the state.

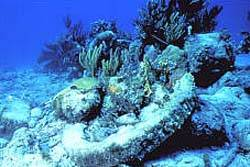
Underwater artifact with sea life off the coast of Florida

During the late 19th century, the federal government and local port authorities made improvements to channels and harbors and charted and mapped Florida's waters. These improvements, along with technological advances in navigation and shipbuilding during the 20th century, helped propel Florida's ports to global prominence in trade and commerce and the cruise industry and marine recreation. Florida may well hold the record for the number of pleasure boats used by sport fishermen, jet skiers, wind-surfers, power boaters, sail boaters, water-skiers and scuba divers.

The Florida Keys contain the only coral reefs in the continental United States, making it a haven for fish and coral. These same reefs are hazards to navigation. Thousands of ships have wrecked over the centuries in the Keys and elsewhere in the waters of Florida. The most famous Spanish wreck found west of the Florida Keys was the above-mentioned Nuestra Señora de Atocha, found after a sixteen-year search by Mel Fisher in 1985. The value of the ship's treasure has been estimated at $300,000,000.

In the late 20th and early 21st centuries, the U.S. Coast Guard had to deal with thousands of Cubans trying to make it to the shores of Florida. More than 2,700 were stopped in 2005. Often crossing the strait in home-made rafts and boats, it is unknown how many have lost their lives in the attempt. Under U.S. and Cuban law, emigration is illegal, and any Cuban attempting to reach the U.S. found at sea will be deported. Under a 1995 migration accord between the two nations, Cubans who make it to the shores of Florida or other states are generally allowed to remain.

== See also ==
- History of Florida
- List of lighthouses in Florida
