= USS Narcissus =

USS Narcissus may refer to the following ships of the United States Navy:

- USS Narcissus (1863), a screw steamer which served in the Union, during the American Civil War.
- USS Narcissus (WAGL-238), a U.S. Coast Guard ship that was transferred to the U.S. Navy; served as a large inland buoy tender until the end of World War II; returned to the Coast Guard.
