= 1919 Southampton mutiny =

British army mutiny after WWI

The 1919 Southampton mutiny was a mutiny in the British Army which occurred in January 1919 in the aftermath of World War I. The soldiers, after being misinformed that they were being transported to Southampton to be demobilized, were then ordered to board troop ships for France. The mutiny was brought to an end without bloodshed when General Sir Hugh Trenchard threatened lethal force.

== Mutiny ==
=== January Events ===
On 13 January 1919, around 5,000 soldiers mutinied in Southampton, taking over the docks and refusing to obey orders.

The former Royal Flying Corps and Royal Air Force General Sir Hugh Trenchard arrived in Southampton in mid-January after Sir William Robertson, the Commander-in-Chief of Home Forces asked him to take charge. Trenchard had witnessed mutinies among French troops during World War I, and was quite prepared to be ruthless in his dealings. After speaking to the ineffective camp commandant and sizing up the situation, Trenchard marched out onto the docks and personally issued a loud summons for the men to assemble. He then informed the soldiers that he would hear their grievances but only after they had returned to their duties. This resulted in much heckling and Trenchard almost knocked over by the restless surging crowd. Leaving the scene in some disorder, he decided force would be needed, and arranged for 250 soldiers, including military policemen, to be sent to the docks. Whilst they were en route, Sir Henry Sclater, the General Officer Commanding Southern Command, telephoned Trenchard in the middle of the night, and after hearing Trenchard's plan, insisted that Trenchard must under no circumstances order the security detachment to open fire on the mutineers. Trenchard replied that he was not seeking the G.O.C.'s approval, merely informing him of his intentions.

After the security detachment arrived at the docks, Trenchard spoke to his men, explaining his plan and issuing them with extra ammunition, and ordering them to fix bayonets. The security detachment was then deployed to the open front of the huge customs shed where the mutinying soldiers were gathered. Trenchard ordered the detachment to load and make ready, he then ordered on the mutineers to surrender. In response a sergeant shouted obscenities. Trenchard's military policemen seized the sergeant, none of the sergeant's fellow mutineers resisting in the process. Trenchard re-issued his order for submission, and the crowd gave their assent.

Trenchard spent the rest of the day hearing each man in turn. The majority were prepared to return to France and Trenchard granted such men a conditional discharge from charges of insurrection in military law that they were liable to. He also discovered that they were in fact going to be transported back to France.

Those ring leaders who had been in the customs shed were confined aboard the troop ship. Some other ring leaders were holding out in nearby huts and Trenchard obtained firehoses and had the windows of the huts smashed. The remaining ring leaders were then drenched in ice-cold water and they surrendered, being detained aboard the troop ship.

=== August 1919 ===
In August 1919 it was reported in American newspapers that a similar situation involving 300 soldiers of the Berkshire, Gloucestershire and Warwickshire Regiments had occurred in August 1919. They had been on leave in the UK when they refused to board a ship at Southampton to sail to France, where they feared they would be outfitted for battle in the Allied intervention in the Russian Civil War. After airing their grievances the men were marched, under armed escort, back to their rest camp.

== See also ==
- HMS Kilbride mutiny
- Invergordon mutiny
