= HMS Kilbride =

Gunboat of the Royal Navy

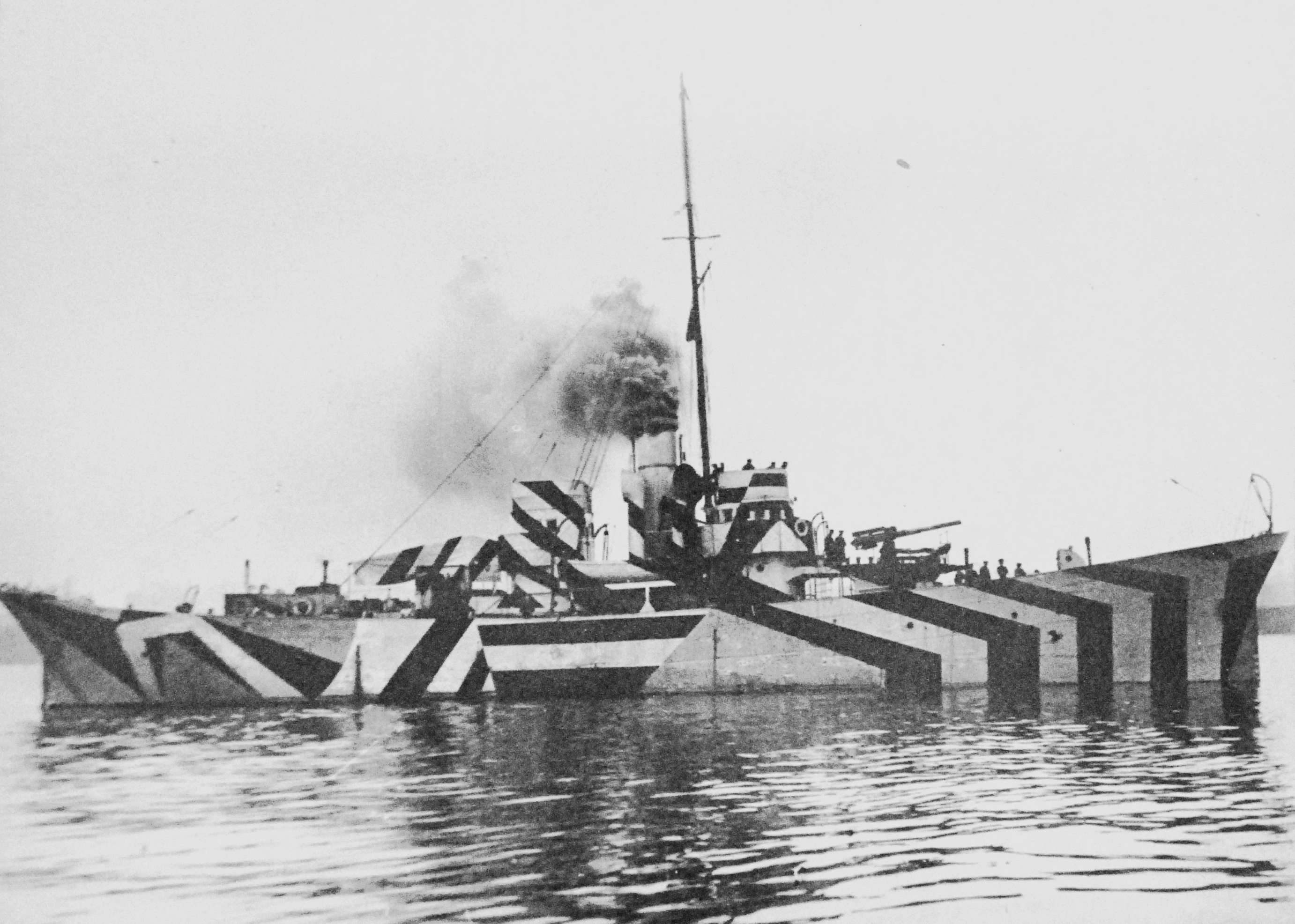
- HMS Kilbride, pictured in 1918 with dazzle camouflage

General characteristics
- Type: Sloop
- Displacement: 895 tons
- Length: 182 ft (55 m)
- Beam: 30 ft (9.1 m)
- Draught: 10 ft 6 in (3.20 m)
- Installed power: 1,400 ihp (1,000 kW)
- Propulsion: Single shaft; Reciprocating steam engine
- Speed: 13 knots
- Complement: 57
- Armament: 1 × QF 4-inch (102 mm) gun; Up to 12 depth charges

HMS Kilbride was a sloop of the Kil class which were also referred to as gunboats, built for the Royal Navy during the First World War. It was designed for anti-submarine warfare, but was completed too late in the war to be used extensively in that role. The class were designed to be double-ended to confuse submarine observers, and were painted in dazzle camouflage.

Kilbride entered service towards the end of the war, and was sold for commercial use in 1920. She was subsequently sold to Italian owners and was sunk by British aircraft in January 1943.

== Construction and design ==
The Kil class was intended as a patrol and escort ship to equip the Auxiliary Patrol with better sea-keeping and greater endurance and speed than the trawlers that were being used by and then being built for built for the Auxiliary Patrol. Large orders (eventually reaching 85 ships) were placed for the new design of "fast trawlers" from July 1917. The type was re-classified as a patrol gunboat in January 1918. The ships were 182 feet (55 m) long overall and 170 feet (52 m) between perpendiculars, with a beam of 30 feet (9.1 m) and a draught of 10 feet 6 inches (3.20 m). Displacement was 895 long tons (909 t) normal. The ships had a symmetrical, double-ended hull, with identical bow and stern, in order to make it harder for enemy submarines to estimate the ship's course.

They were powered by a single triple-expansion steam engine, with steam supplied from a coal-fired cylindrical boiler. The machinery was rated at 1,400 indicated horsepower (1,000 kW), giving a speed of 13 knots (15 mph; 24 km/h). Design armament was a single 4-inch gun, with at least six depth charges also carried. The ships had a crew of 39 officers and other ranks.

Kilbride was launched at Hall Russell's Aberdeen shipyard on 21 August 1918.

== Mutiny ==
On 13 January 1919, there was a mutiny on board while the ship was docked at Milford Haven. Eight men were court-martialled on charges of non-violent mutiny and sentenced to 90 days and two years hard labour followed by dismissal.

== Sale and civil use ==
Kilbride was sold on 14 February 1920 to Robinson, Brown & Joplin for conversion to civilian use and resale and was renamed Scotsgap. She was subsequently renamed Rebus and then Poggioreale. By 1930, the ship was registered at Genoa as Nino di Gailura, and she was renamed as Alfredo in 1933, by which time she had been re-engined with an oil engine. Alfredo was torpedoed and sunk by RAF aircraft on 20 January 1943. She remained listed on Lloyd's Register at the start of 1943, but was listed by Lloyds as a War Loss during that year.

== See also ==
- 1919 Southampton mutiny
- Royal Navy mutiny of 1919

== Bibliography ==
=== References ===
- Carew, Anthony (1981). The Lower Deck of the Royal Navy 1900-39: The Invergordon Mutiny in Perspective. Manchester University Press. ISBN 9780719008412.
- Cliff, Tony (1979). Lenin. Vol. IV. Pluto Press. ISBN 9780861040230.
- Dittmar, F.G; Colledge, J.J. (1972). British Warships 1914–1919. Shepperton, UK: Ian Allan. ISBN 0-7110-0380-7.
- Gardiner, Robert; Gray, Randal, eds. (1985). Conway's All The World's Fighting Ships 1906–1921. London: Conway Maritime Press. ISBN 0-85177-245-5.
- Sewell, Rob (2018). Germany: From Revolution to Counter-Revolution. Wellred Books. ISBN 9781900007788.
