= House of Refuge at Gilbert's Bar =

- House of Refuge at Gilbert's Bar (Gilbert's Bar House of Refuge)
- U.S. National Register of Historic Places
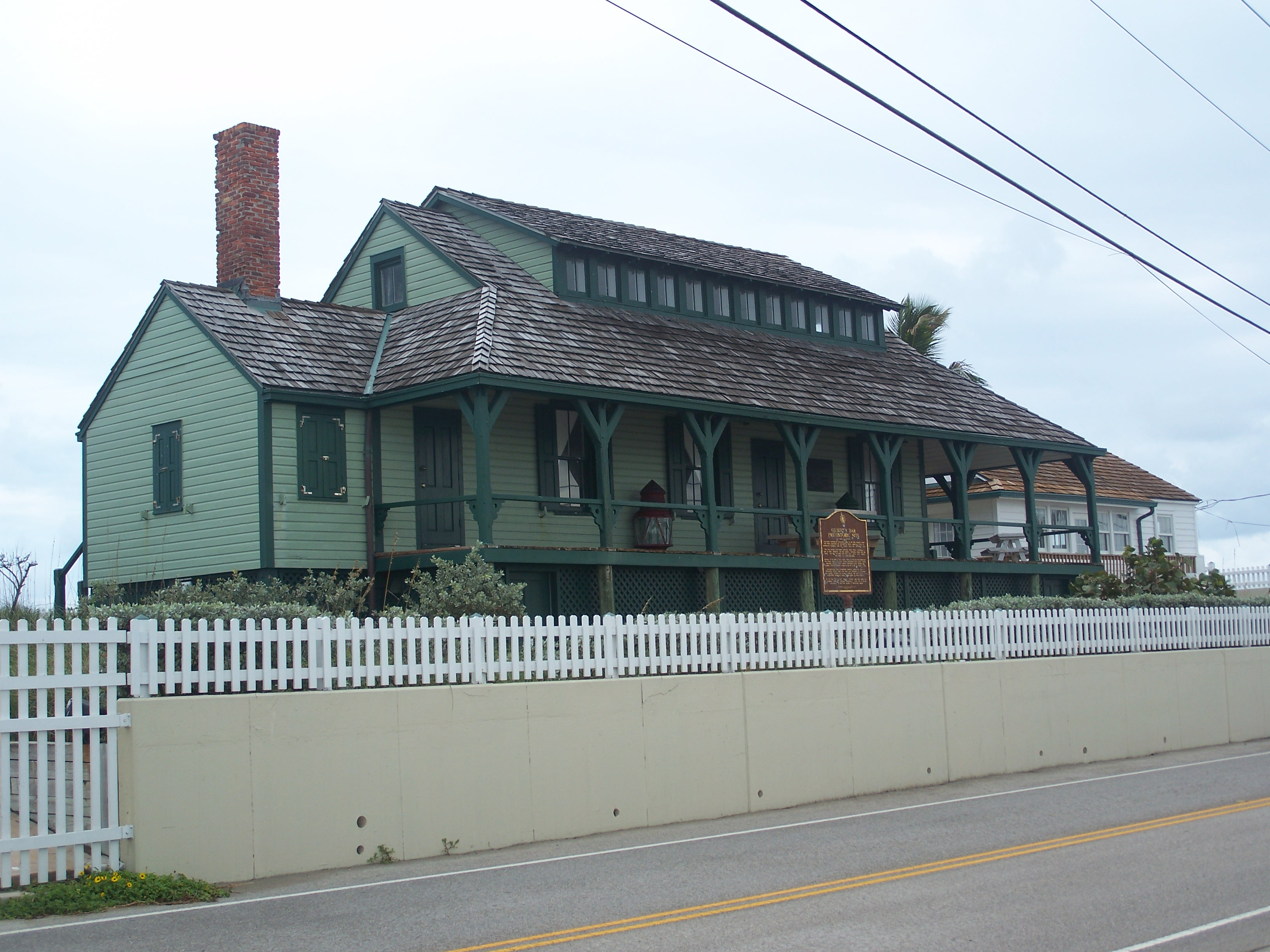

- Location within Florida Location within the United States
- Location: 301 S.E. MacArthur Boulevard Hutchinson Island near Stuart, Florida
- Coordinates: 27°11′58″N 80°09′56″W
- Built: 1876
- NRHP reference No.: 74000651
- Added to NRHP: May 3, 1974

The House of Refuge at Gilbert's Bar, also known as Gilbert's Bar House of Refuge, the House of Refuge Museum, or simply the House of Refuge, is a historic building located at 301 S.E. MacArthur Boulevard, on Hutchinson Island east of Stuart, Florida. It is the oldest surviving building in Martin County.

This House of Refuge is the last remaining of the original dozen shipwreck life-saving stations on Florida's Atlantic Coast operated by the United States Life-Saving Service, one of the predecessor agencies to the United States Coast Guard. Built in 1876 to help stranded sailors, its long colorful history spans nearly 70 years. Today it is owned by the Martin County government and leased to the Martin County Historical Society, which operates it as a museum exhibiting life-saving equipment used over the years and showcasing the keeper's quarters, c. 1904. On May 3, 1974, the House of Refuge was added to the U.S. National Register of Historic Places.

== National Register listing ==
- House of Refuge at Gilbert's Bar
- (added 1974 - Building - #74000651)
- Also known as Gilbert's Bar House of Refuge
- North of Bathtub Beach on Hutchinson Island east of Stuart, Florida, Stuart
- Historic Significance: Event
- Area of Significance: Social History
- Period of Significance: 1875-1899
- Owner: Local Gov't
- Historic Function: Domestic, Government
- Historic Sub-function: Hotel, Public Works
- Current Sub-function: Museum, Research Facility

== History ==
The House of Refuge is located at Gilbert's Bar (also called "Saint Lucie Rocks"), two miles north of what is now the St. Lucie Inlet on the coastal rocks of the Anastasia Formation, one of the most prominent geologic outcroppings along the entire Eastern seaboard. The house was one of ten houses of refuge commissioned by the U.S. Treasury Department for the United States Life-Saving Service as havens for shipwrecked sailors and travelers along the barren east coast of Florida. It is the only one that remains today.

On March 19, 1875, William H. Hunt of Dade County granted the U.S. Secretary of the Treasury a lien of 20 years for the piece of land at Saint Lucie Rocks known as Gilbert's Bar as a site for a house of refuge on the sea coast. According to the 1879 "Annual Report of the Life Saving Service" these houses of refuge along the east coast of Florida "contemplate no other life saving operations than affording succor to shipwrecked persons who may be cast ashore, and who, in the absence of such means of relief, would be liable to perish from hunger and thirst in that desolate region. Crews of surfmen are not needed here, but the keepers and members of their families are required to go along the beach, in both directions, in search of castaways immediately after a storm."

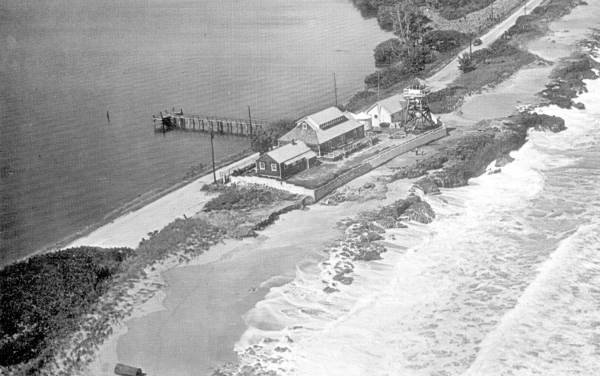
Aerial view of the property, c. 1960.

It offered shelter to the survivors of the Georges Valentine shipwreck in 1904. Captain William E. Rea was the Keeper of the House of Refuge at the time and aided the seven survivors. On October 17, during the same storm the Spanish ship Cosme Calzado wrecked three miles north of the Georges Valentine, but fifteen of the sixteen men survived. The surviving crew joined the survivors of the Georges Valentine at the House of Refuge. The men later returned home via Jacksonville, Florida except for one: Edward Sarkenglov remained and became a local fisherman. Captain Rea and his wife lived in the House of Refuge until May 1907.

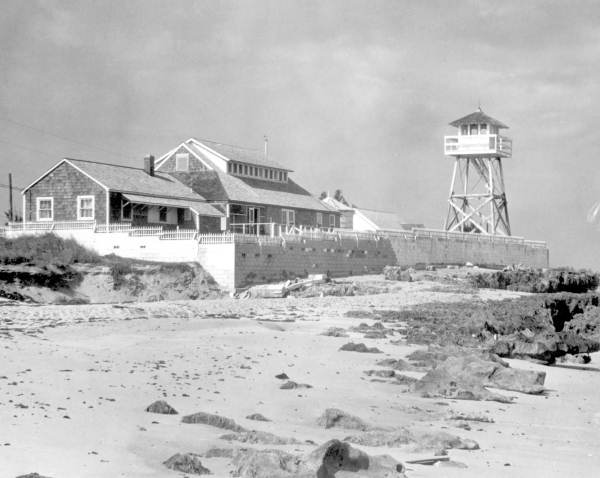
House of Refuge at Gilbert's Bar, c. 1973

In 1915, the House of Refuge became U.S. Coast Guard Station #207 when the U.S. Life-Saving Service was combined with the U.S. Revenue Cutter Service to form the modern U.S. Coast Guard. The keeper, Axel Johansen, and his wife, Kate, continued to serve at the refuge; the title of his position was changed from "Keeper" to "Surfman #1." Four other men were stationed at the house, and during World War I the post of five was supplemented by local youths belonging to the Home Guard.

The facility also served as a lookout for enemy submarines in World War II. It was saved by the Historical Society of Martin County in 1955, and is listed on the National Register of Historic Places.

== Museum exhibits ==
The House of Refuge provides a look at turn of the 20th century living along the coast. Areas available for public viewing are the boathouse, kitchen, dining room, parlor, bedroom and a lookout tower constructed during World War II. New exhibit space includes a timeline of Hutchinson Island dating from 2000 BC to the hurricanes of 2004.

== See also ==
- National Register of Historic Places listings in Florida
- Elliott Museum
- List of maritime museums in the United States
