= Royal Navy mutiny of 1919 =

- Date: 10 October and 21 November 1919
- Location: United Kingdom
- Participants: Sailors of the British Royal Navy
- Outcome: 96 offenders had been arrested and punished, ten by imprisonment

The Royal Navy mutiny of 1919 was a peaceful mutiny of several dozen sailors protesting against their deployment to the British campaign in the Baltic of 1918–19. Of all who left their ships 96 offenders were arrested and punished, ten by imprisonment.

== Background ==
The British campaign in the Baltic 1918–19 was a part of the Allied intervention in the Russian Civil War. The codename of the Royal Navy campaign was "Operation Red Trek". The intervention played a key role in enabling the establishment of the independent states of Estonia and Latvia but failed to secure the control of Petrograd by White Russian forces, which was one of the main goals of the campaign. The action was unpopular with the men of the Royal Navy and earlier in the year on 13 January 1919, there was a mutiny on board HMS Kilbride while the ship was docked at Milford Haven. Eight men were court-martialled on charges of non-violent mutiny and sentenced to 90 days and two years hard labour followed by dismissal.

== Mutiny ==
When the men of the 1st Destroyer Flotilla found that they were going to be sent to the Baltic to take part in operations against the Russians, discussions took place about what options they had. The government had publicly pledged that only volunteers would be sent to take part in operations against the Russians. Yet here they appeared to violate that pledge when destroyers HMS Velox, HMS Versatile and HMS Wryneck were ordered to the Baltic. On 12 October 1919, a code phrase, "My name's Walker" was sent through the fleet signalling the start of the mutiny and 150 sailors left their posts preventing the 1st Destroyer Flotilla from leaving Port Edgar, Scotland. Almost 50 men then marched to London to present their petitions at the British government in Whitehall. Of all who left their ships 96 offenders were arrested and punished, ten by imprisonment.

Significant unrest took place among British sailors in the Baltic. This included small-scale mutinies amongst the crews of HMS Vindictive, Delhi—the latter due in part to the behaviour of Admiral Cowan—and other ships stationed in Björkö Sound. The causes were a general war-weariness (many of the crews had fought in World War I), poor food and accommodation, a lack of leave and a developing sense of class consciousness.

== Bibliography ==
Notes

References

- Carew, Anthony (1981). The Lower Deck of the Royal Navy 1900-39: The Invergordon Mutiny in Perspective. Manchester University Press. ISBN 9780719008412.
- Cliff, Tony (1979). Lenin. Vol. IV. Pluto Press. ISBN 9780861040230.
- Collingridge, Vanessa (8 April 2008). "The Murmansk Mutiny". BBC.
- Kinvig, Clifford (2006). Churchill's Crusade: The British Invasion of Russia, 1918-1920. A & C Black. ISBN 9781852854775. - Total pages: 373
- Langworth, Richard M. (2019). "Churchill and the Baltic, Part I: 1918-1931". International Churchill Society.
- Sewell, Rob (2018). Germany: From Revolution to Counter-Revolution. Wellred Books. ISBN 9781900007788.
