= Kil-class sloop =

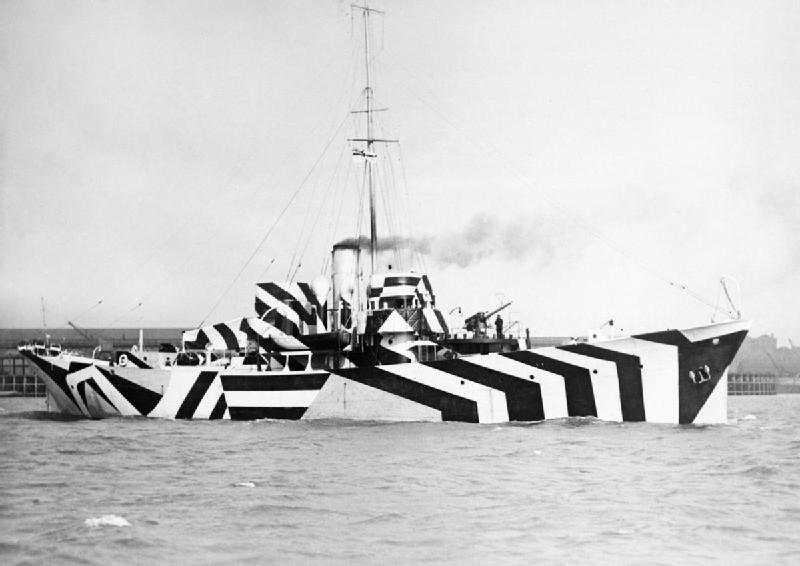
- HMS Kildangan, pictured in 1918 with dazzle camouflage

Class overview
- Builders: George Brown; Hall Russell; Smiths Dock; Cochrane; Cook, Welton & Gemmell
- Operators: Royal Navy
- Preceded by: P-class sloop
- Built: 1917-1919
- Planned: 85
- Completed: 55
- Canceled: 30

General characteristics
- Type: Sloop
- Displacement: 895 tons
- Length: 182 ft (55 m)
- Beam: 30 ft (9.1 m)
- Draught: 10 ft 6 in (3.20 m)
- Installed power: 1,400 ihp (1,000 kW)
- Propulsion: Single shaft; Reciprocating steam engine
- Speed: 13 knots
- Complement: 57
- Armament: 1 × QF 4-inch (102 mm) gun; Up to 12 depth charges

The Kil class was a class of sloops, also referred to as gunboats, built for the Royal Navy during the First World War. They were designed for anti-submarine warfare, but were completed too late in the war to be used extensively in that role. They were designed to be double-ended to confuse submarine observers, and were painted in dazzle camouflage. Following the war, the majority of the class were sold off and converted to coastal cargo vessels.

== Design and description ==
The Kil class were designed to counter the U-boat threat posed by the Imperial German Navy during the First World War. They were designed to be equipped with hydrophones and depth charges to detect and destroy enemy submarines before they posed a threat to allied convoys. The class began to be launched towards the end of 1917. So they could be constructed, an order for 85 anti-submarine trawlers was cancelled across six shipyards in order to free up enough berths for the building of the Kil class. Each ship took around six months to be constructed. Ships in the class were named after villages in Scotland and Ireland beginning with "Kil".

Similar to the 24-class sloop, the ships were built with a double ended design in order to confuse enemy submarine observers who were trying to work out which direction the ships were due to travel in. They had a single central funnel, and deckhouses both fore and aft were designed to be similar in order to enhance the effect. The class were painted in dazzle camouflage.

The class entered service after the main threat of the U-boats had passed, and therefore their effectiveness in anti-submarine warfare cannot be determined. Only 38 of the 85 ships ordered were completed by the time the Armistice with Germany was signed on 11 November 1918. The ships were put into reserve following the war, and were put up for sale by the Admiralty after the subject of their post-war use was brought up in the House of Commons. On 14 February 1920, 48 ships of the Kil class were sold to two different civilian owners for conversion to cargo carriers. Some ships were used as whalers, while others were used as coastal cargo vessels around the United Kingdom.

== Ships ==
- Kilbeggan - built by George Brown & Company, launched 1918
- Kilberry - built by George Brown, launched 1918
- Kilbirnie - built by George Brown, launched 1919. Foundered on 6 September 1920 on Seven Stones reef.
- Kilbride - built by Hall, Russell & Company, launched 1918
- Kilburn - built by Hall Russell, launched 1918
- Kilcavan - built by Hall Russell, launched 1918
- Kilchattan - built by Cook, Welton & Gemmell, launched 1918
- Kilchreest - built by Smiths Dock, launched 1918
- Kilchrenan - built by Smiths Dock, launched 1918
- Kilchvan - built by Cook, Welton & Gemmell, launched 1918
- Kilclaire - built by Smiths Dock, launched 1918
- Kilclief - built by Cook, Welton & Gemmell, launched 1918
- Kilclogher - built by Cook, Welton & Gemmell, launched 1918
- Kilcock - built by Smiths Dock, launched 1918
- Kildalkey - built by Cochrane & Sons, launched 1918. Sold to Robinson, Brown & Joplin on 14 February 1920, and resold in the same year to Kerguelen Sealing and Whaling. Wrecked in 1937 in Saldanha Bay, South Africa.
- Kildangan - built by Cochrane, launched 1918
- Kildare - built by Cochrane, launched 1918
- Kildary - built by Smiths Dock, launched 1917
- Kildavin - built by Smiths Dock, launched 1918
- Kildimo - built by Smiths Dock, launched 1918
- Kildonan - built by Cochrane, launched 1918
- Kildorough - built by Smiths Dock, launched 1917
- Kildorrey - built by Smiths Dock, launched 1918
- Kildress - built by Cochrane, launched 1918
- Kildwick - built by Cochrane, launched 1918
- Kildysart - built by Smiths Dock, launched 1918
- Kilfenora - built by Cochrane, launched 1917. Sold to Robinson, Brown & Joplin on 14 February 1920, and resold in the same year to Kerguelen Sealing and Whaling. Wrecked in 1940 in Saldanha Bay, South Africa.
- Kilfinny - built by Cochrane, launched 1918
- Kilfree - built by Cochrane, launched 1918
- Kilfullert - built by Smiths Dock, launched 1918
- Kilgarvin - built by Smiths Dock, launched 1918
- Kilgobnet - built by Smiths Dock, launched 1917
- Kilham - built by Smiths Dock, launched 1918
- Kilkeel - built by Smiths Dock, launched 1918
- Killena - built by Smiths Dock, launched 1918
- Killerig - built by Smiths Dock, launched 1918
- Killeney - built by Smiths Dock, launched 1918
- Killour - built by Smiths Dock, launched 1918
- Killowen - built by Smiths Dock, launched 1918
- Kilybegs - built by Smiths Dock, launched 1918
- Killygordon - built by Smiths Dock, launched 1918. Sold to Robinson, Brown & Joplin on 14 February 1920, and resold in the same year to Homeland SS Company, renamed Homeland. Subsequently, sold to Beadon Line and then to J. Crass. Sold again in 1946 to Gilbert Vallance Webb, and resold in 1947 to Arden Hall Steamship Company, being renamed Laevald. Sold to Dent and Goodwin in 1951, and in 1952 to B. Nikolou and was renamed Eleoussa with registry in Panama. Registry changed to Costa Rica in 1955, and in 1958 it was sold to S. Yianniouli and renamed to Panaghia Tinou. In 1961, she was renamed to Panaghia Odohitria, and again in 1963 back to Panaghia Tinou. In 1964 she ran aground near Trieste, Italy, with the hull splitting in two.
- Kilmalcolm - built by Smiths Dock, launched 1918
- Kilmacrennan - built by Smiths Dock, launched 1918
- Kilmaine - built by Smiths Dock, launched 1918
- Kilmallock - built by Smiths Dock, launched 1918
- Kilmanahan - built by Smiths Dock, launched 1918
- Kilmarnock - built by Smiths Dock, launched 1919. Renamed Chelsea after being sold to a private firm. Purchased by United States Rear-Admiral Richard Byrd in 1928 for his first Antarctica expedition. He renamed the ship the Eleanor Bolling, in honor of his mother, Eleanor Bolling Byrd. Sold in 1930 to a seal hunting company, and resold in 1933 to the Vamar Shipping Company and named Vamar. Sank 21 March 1942, while leaving Port St. Joe, Florida carrying a load of lumber to Cuba.
- Killmartin - built by Smiths Dock, launched 1919
- Kilmead - built by Smiths Dock, launched 1919. Sold to L. Gueret & Co on 14 February 1920 and renamed to Mead. Sold to Charles Louis Storm in 1927, and resold during the same year to Smiths' Coasters. She was acquired by the Royal Navy in 1942 and converted to a cable ship, transferred to the South African Navy as HMSAS Mead. Returned to coastal shipping in 1947, and sold to Point Shipping Company in 1957 as Komati. Sold to Durban Lines in 1959, and to K. Nathan in 1960 for deconstruction.
- Kilmelford - built by Smiths Dock, launched 1919
- Kilmersdon - built by Smiths Dock, launched 1919
- Kilmington - built by Smiths Dock, launched 1919
- Kilmore - built by Smiths Dock, launched 1919
- Kilmuckridge - built by Smiths Dock, launched 1919
- Kilmun - built by Smiths Dock, launched 1918. Completed as a cable ship and renamed Rask, sank on 31 January 1950.

Thirty other ships were cancelled, fourteen were to be built by Cochrane, eleven by Cook, Welton & Gemmell, three by Hall Russell and two by Hawthorn Leslie.
