= Vamar Shipwreck Site =

- U.S. National Register of Historic Places
- Florida Underwater Archaeological Preserve
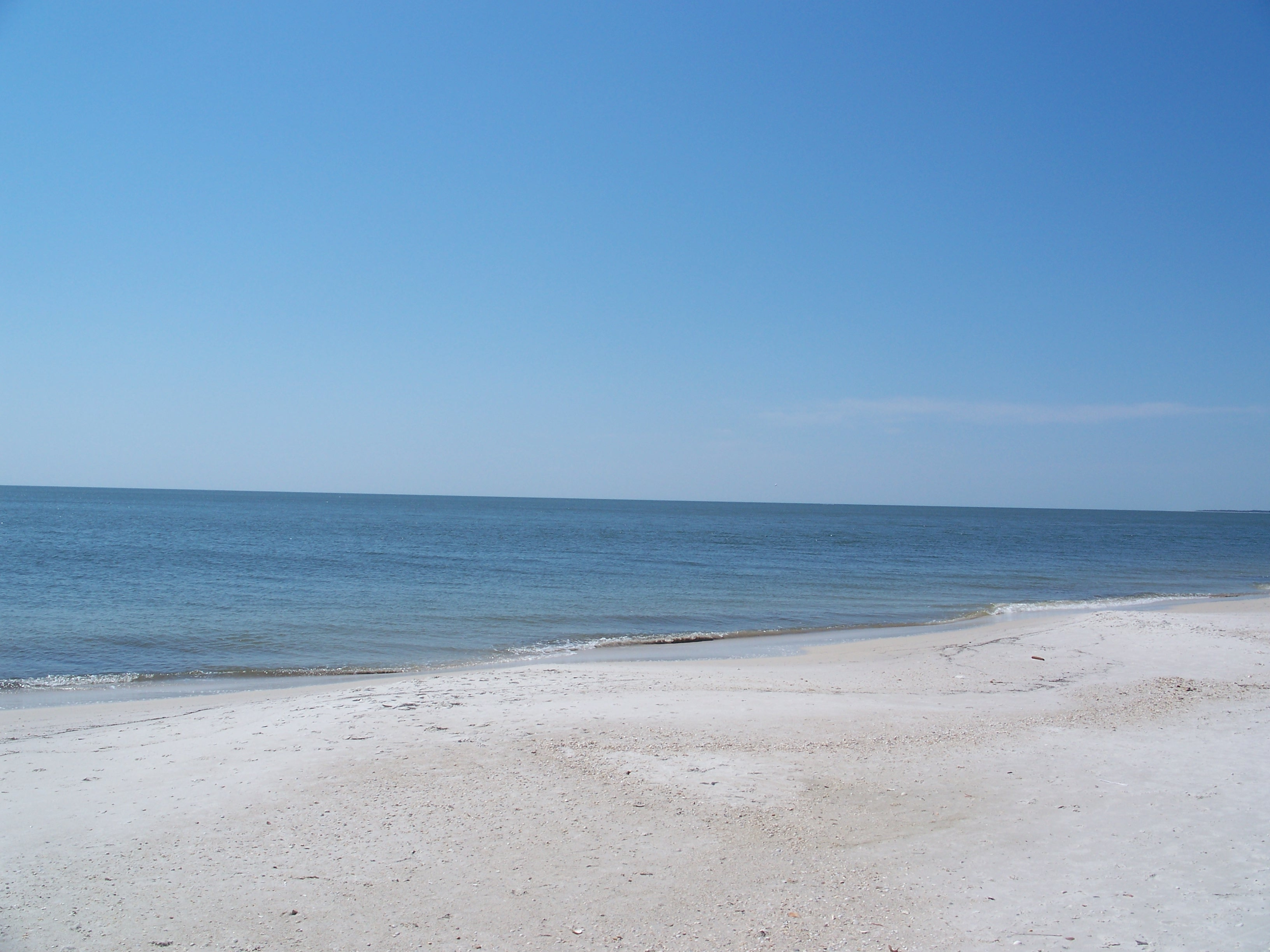
- Gulf of Mexico, looking in the direction of the Vamar from Mexico Beach

- Location within Florida Location within the United States
- Nearest city: Mexico Beach, Florida
- Coordinates: 29°53′56″N 85°27′48″W
- Built: 1919
- NRHP reference No.: 06000243
- FUAP No.: 9

Significant dates
- Added to NRHP: April 10, 2006
- Designated FUAP: 2004

The Vamar is a shipwreck (which sank on March 21, 1942) near Mexico Beach, Florida, United States. It is located 3.7 miles offshore from Mexico Beach. It became the ninth Florida Underwater Archaeological Preserve when it was dedicated in 2004. On April 10, 2006, it was added to the U.S. National Register of Historic Places.

== History ==
The Vamar underwent several name changes in its history:

- 1919 - 1920 built as a gun boat for the Royal Navy, named HMS Kilmarnock
- 1920 - 1923 S.S. Kilmarnock
- 1926 - S.S. Kilmarnock, registered Canadian
- 1928 - renamed the Chelsea after being sold to a private firm
- 1928 - 1930 Rear-Admiral Richard Byrd acquired the ship for his journey to Antarctica. He renamed the ship the Eleanor Bolling, in honor of his mother, Eleanor Bolling Byrd. During the voyage, due to rough seas, the crew nicknamed the ship the "Evermore Rolling".
- 1930 - sold to a seal hunting company
- 1933 - the Vamar Shipping Company bought the ship and renamed it the Vamar
- 1941 - sold to Bolivar-Atlantic Navigation Company, registered Panama
- 1942 - March 21, after leaving Port St. Joe, Florida carrying a load of lumber to Cuba, Vamar ran aground, capsized and sunk in heavy seas in 25 feet of water off Mexico Beach, Florida (29°54′N 85°27′W) under suspicious circumstances. The pilot reported that the ship was overloaded and top heavy. Local suspicions that the ship had been sabotaged to block the channel into Port St. Joe led to a Coast Guard investigation, which was unable to verify the suspicions.
- 2004 - Vamar became Florida's Ninth Florida Underwater Archaeological Preserve and was listed on the National Register of Historic Places.
