= Half Moon (shipwreck) =

1930 sailboat wreck in Florida, US

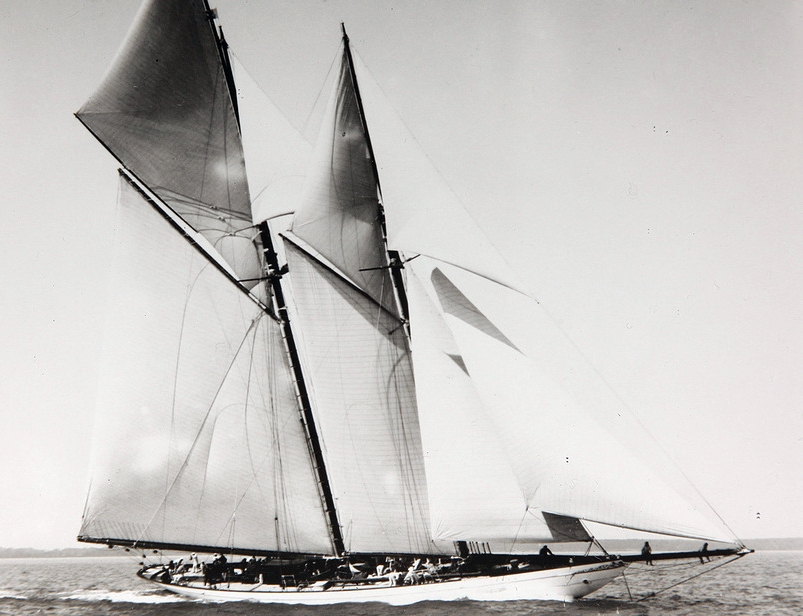
- Germania, 1908

History
- Name: Germania (1908–1917); Exen (1908–1921); Half Moon (1921–1930)
- Namesake: Halve Maen
- Owner: Count Gustav Krupp von Bohlen und Halbach (1908–1917); Christoffer Hannevig (1917–1921); Gordon Woodbury (1921–1922); Charles D. Vail (1922–c.1923); H. Fink and A. Toplitz (c.1923–1928); Ernest D. Smiley (1928–1930)
- Builder: Friedrich Krupp Germaniawerft, Kiel, Germany
- Cost: 704,024 marks
- Launched: 1908
- Fate: Sank, 1930

General characteristics
- Type: Schooner
- Displacement: 250 t (246 long tons)
- Length: 47.21 m (154 ft 11 in) o/a; 32.94 m (108 ft 1 in) w/l
- Beam: 8.17 m (26 ft 10 in)
- Draft: 5.41 m (17 ft 9 in) max.
- Sail plan: 2-masted; Sail area 15,000 sq ft (1,400 m^{2})
- Crew: 40
- Half Moon (shipwreck)
- U.S. National Register of Historic Places
- Florida Underwater Archaeological Preserve
- Location within Miami Location within Florida Location within the United States
- Location: Miami-Dade County, Florida, US
- Nearest city: Miami, Florida
- Coordinates: 25°43′39″N 80°8′4″W
- NRHP reference No.: 01000531
- FUAP No.: 7

Significant dates
- Added to NRHP: May 31, 2001
- Designated FUAP: 2000

The Half Moon (also known as the Germania and Exen) was a racing sailboat; it sank in 1930 near Miami, Florida, United States. The wreck is outside Bear Cut, which separates Virginia Key from Key Biscayne. Christened Germania, the racing yacht featured a chrome-nickel steel hull built by Krupp-Germania-Werft in 1908 in Kiel, Germany. During a visit to England in 1914, the yacht was seized as a 'war prize'. After changing owners several times, and surviving an especially-violent storm off Virginia, the yacht became a floating restaurant and dance hall off Miami. It sank near Key Biscayne in 1930. In 2000, the wreck became the seventh Florida Underwater Archaeological Preserve. In 2001, it was added to the US National Register of Historic Places.
