= Lofthus (shipwreck) =

- U.S. National Register of Historic Places
- Florida Underwater Archaeological Preserve
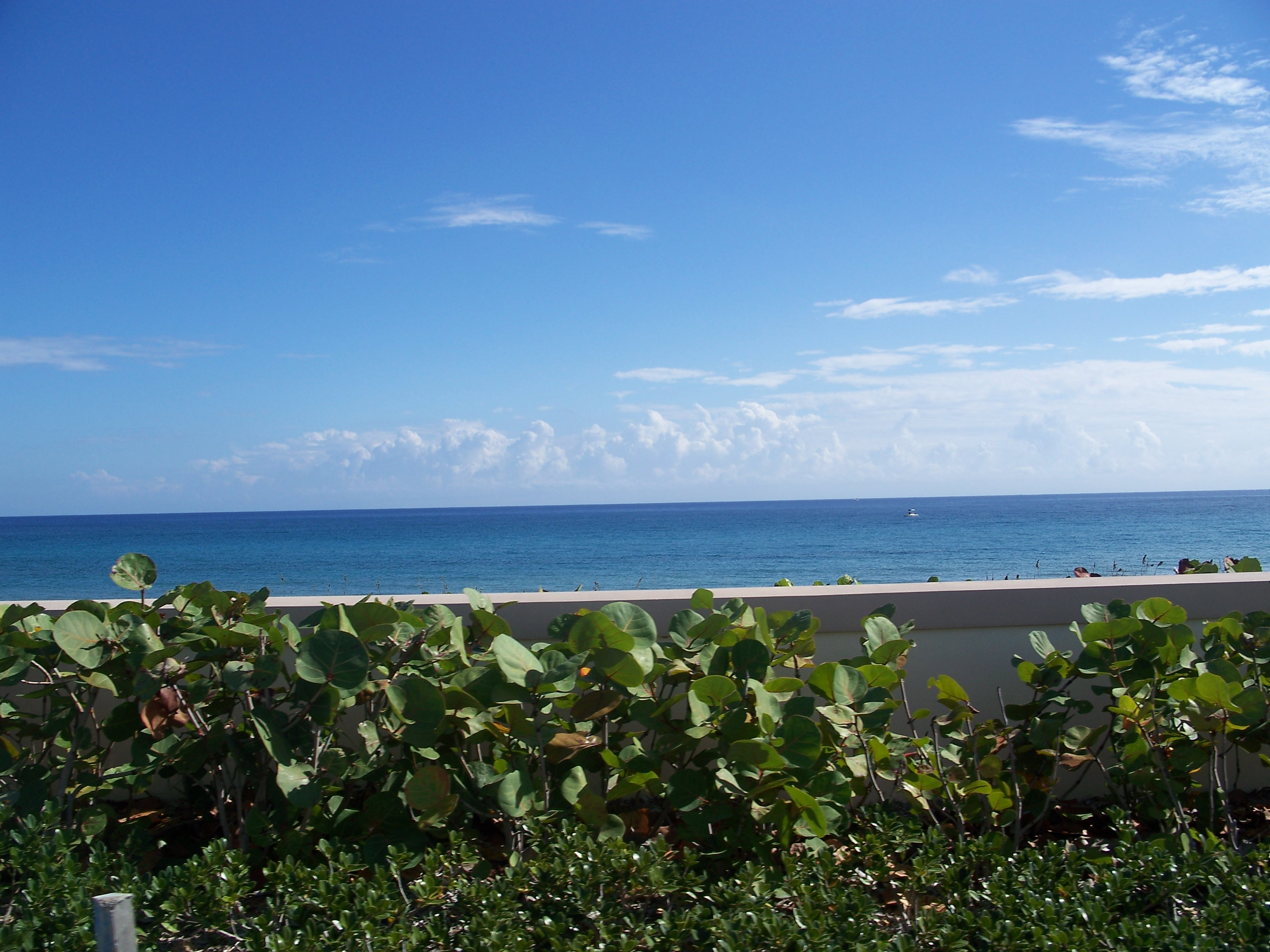
- Atlantic Ocean, looking towards site of shipwreck

- Location within Florida Location within the United States
- Location: Palm Beach County, Florida, USA
- Nearest city: Boynton Beach, Florida
- Coordinates: 26°33′46″N 80°02′18″W
- NRHP reference No.: 03001363
- FUAP No.: 8

Significant dates
- Added to NRHP: January 6, 2004
- Designated FUAP: 2004

The Lofthus (also known as the Cashmere) is a Norwegian shipwreck (which sank in 1898) near Boynton Beach, Florida, United States. Built in 1868 in Sunderland, England by T.R. Oswald, the 222-foot iron-hulled vessel was originally christened Cashmere and rigged as a three masted barque. She was painted with false gunports to ward off Sumatran and Javanese pirates. After a career in the East Indian trade Cashmere was sold to a Norwegian firm, renamed Lofthus, and used in the American trade. On February 4, 1898, the Lofthaus wrecked in a storm en route to Buenos Aires, Argentina from Pensacola, Florida. The crew of 16 men, as well as the ship's cat and dog were rescued by the passing vessel Three Friends, which was smuggling guns to Cuba. The ship, however, was declared a loss as it could not be removed from the shallow reef. The cargo, primarily lumber, was salvaged and brought ashore by locals and reportedly used to build homes in the Boynton Beach area.

The wreck of the Lofthus is located approximately three-quarters of a mile north of the Boynton Inlet and 175 yards offshore from Manalapan. According to the National Park Service, the remnants of the ship rest in 15 to 20 feet of water, with “wreckage rising as much as six feet off the sea floor depending on sand movement.” This often means large sections of the wreck may be entirely covered or completely exposed contingent on waves, currents, and storm conditions. After salvagers dynamited the hull, the wreck site became scattered across an area approximately 290 feet long by 50 feet wide, with the bow, midships, and stern separated into three distinct areas. The wreck is also now home to a number of native marine flora and fauna, including the Caribbean spiny lobster, cubbyu, grunts, jacks, porcupine fish, porkfish, snapper, stingrays, and wrasse.

On January 6, 2004, it was added to the U.S. National Register of Historic Places and was officially designated as the eighth Florida Underwater Archaeological Preserve (and Palm Beach County's first) during a ceremony at Boynton Beach Intracoastal Park. During the ceremony, former Historical Society of Palm Beach County president, Harvey Oyer, presented a brief history of the ship and the wreck. According to the historical society, Oyer's great-great grandparents were “among the first to board the grounded ship and help salvage its cargo before it sank.”
