= Florida Underwater Archaeological Preserve =

Shipwreck preservation sites in Florida, US

The Florida Underwater Archaeological Preserves are a system of underwater parks in the state of Florida, US. They consist of shipwrecks of historic interest, both off the coast and inland, and are open all year round, free of charge. Similar programs have been created in California, Maryland, Michigan, New York, North Carolina, and Vermont.

There are twelve preserves in the Florida system:

- Urca de Lima
- San Pedro
- City of Hawkinsville
- USS Massachusetts (BB-2)
- SS Copenhagen
- SS Tarpon
- Half Moon
- Lofthus
- Vamar
- Regina
- Georges Valentine
- USS Narcissus

== References and external links ==
- The Underwater Archaeological Preserves
- "The Spanish Treasure Fleets of 1715 and 1733: Disasters Strike at Sea", a National Park Service Teaching with Historic Places (TwHP) lesson plan
- Museums in the Sea
