= USS Narcissus (WAGL-238) =

United States Coast Guard vessel

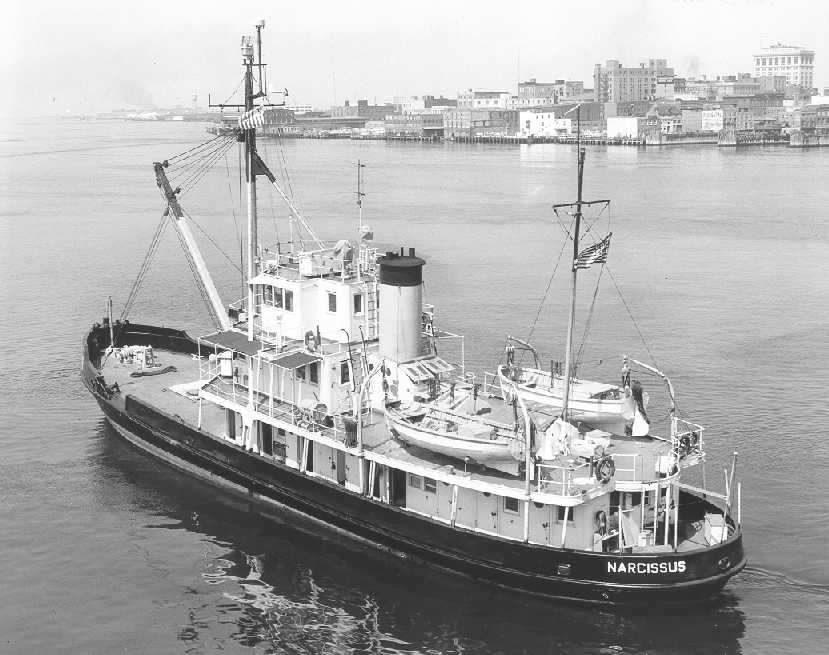

History

United States
- Name: USCG Narcissus
- Builder: Marine Iron and Shipbuilding Corporation
- Laid down: 1939
- In service: 1939
- Out of service: Transferred to the Navy, 1 November 1941
- In service: 1 January 1946
- Out of service: 1971
- Homeport: Portsmouth, Virginia
- Fate: Transferred to Guyana, 1971

United States
- Name: USS Narcissus
- Acquired: Transferred from the Coast Guard, 1 November 1941
- Fate: Returned to the Coast Guard, 1 January 1946

General characteristics
- Type: Buoy tender
- Displacement: 342 long tons (347 t)
- Length: 122 ft (37 m)
- Beam: 28 ft (8.5 m)
- Draft: 8 ft (2.4 m)
- Propulsion: 2 × Superior diesel engines; 2 screws
- Speed: 10.3 knots (19.1 km/h; 11.9 mph)
- Complement: 17

USS Narcissus (WAGL-238) was built for the United States Coast Guard by Marine Iron and Shipbuilding Corporation, Duluth, Minnesota, in 1939. Designed as a navigational aid tender, she was assigned to Wilmington, North Carolina. In 1940 she transferred to Portsmouth, Virginia.

Executive Order 8929 of 1 November 1941 transferred the Coast Guard to the US Navy. Through the war years Narcissus continued to serve as a large inland buoy tender, operating out of Portsmouth. When the Coast Guard returned to the Treasury Department on 1 January 1946, the tender remained in an active status. Through 1970 she has continued her buoytending duties from her permanent station at Portsmouth.
