= SS Regina (1904) =

Shipwreck in Florida, US

- Regina Shipwreck Site
- U.S. National Register of Historic Places
- Florida Underwater Archaeological Preserve
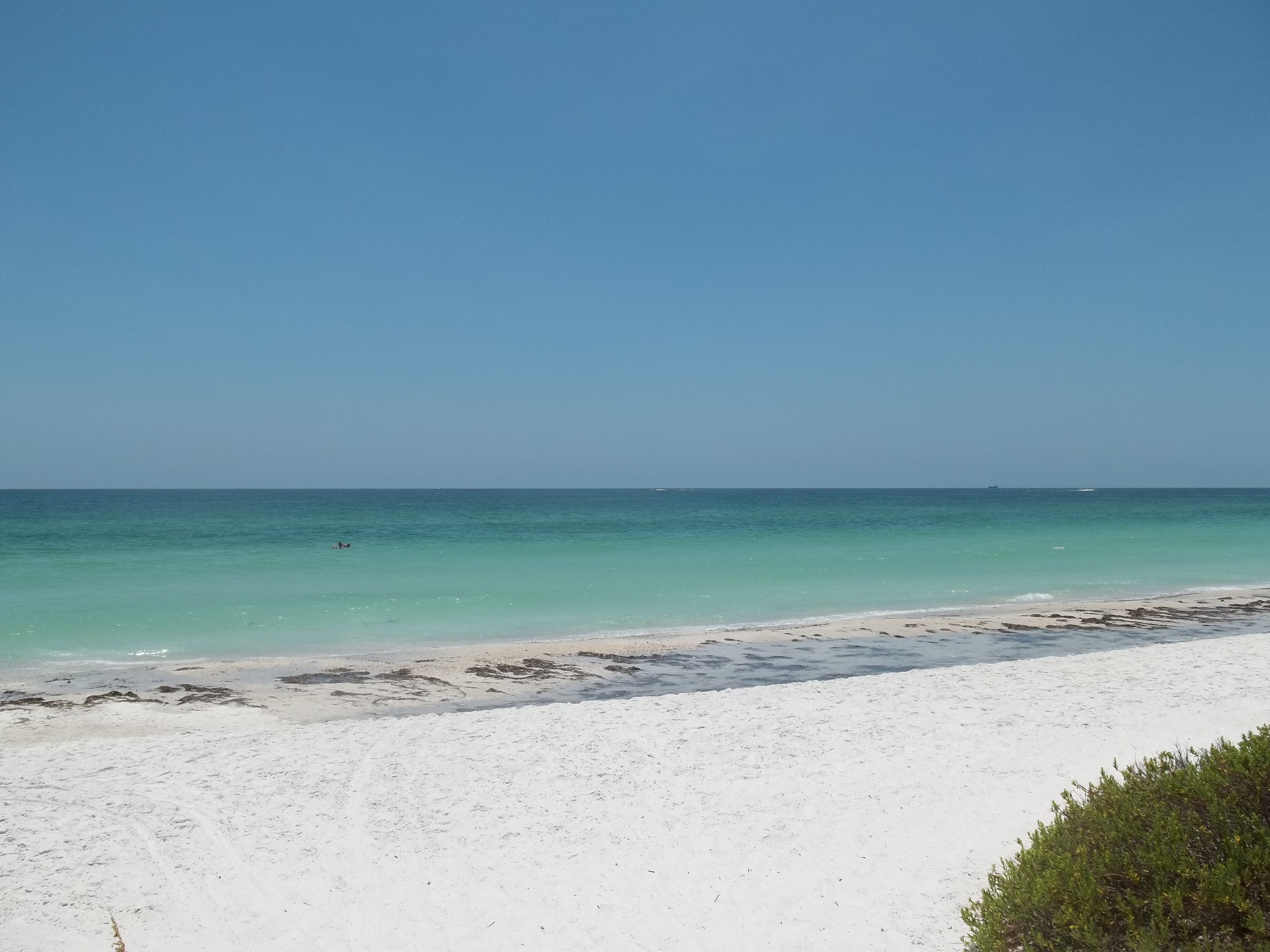
- Looking towards the wreck site from the shore

- Location within Florida Location within the United States
- Location: Manatee County, Florida
- Nearest city: Bradenton Beach, Florida
- Coordinates: 27°28′08″N 82°42′07″W
- Built: 1904
- NRHP reference No.: 05001355
- FUAP No.: 10

Significant dates
- Added to NRHP: December 6, 2005
- Designated FUAP: 2005

SS Regina was a tanker built in Belfast in 1904 that sank on March 8, 1940, near Bradenton Beach, United States. Her wreck is located in the Gulf of Mexico, 75 yards (69 m) off Bradenton Beach. In April 2005, the wreck became the tenth Florida Underwater Archaeological Preserve. On December 6, 2005, it was added to the United States National Register of Historic Places.
