= Georges Valentine (shipwreck) =

Shipwreck in Florida, United States

History

United Kingdom
- Name: Cape Clear
- Owner: S. Myers & Co., Liverpool
- Port of registry: Liverpool
- Route: UK to Australia
- Builder: Bowdler, Chaffer & Co., Wallasey, England
- Launched: 1869
- In service: 1870
- Out of service: 1889
- Fate: Sold, 1889

France
- Name: Georges Valentine
- In service: 1889
- Out of service: 1895
- Fate: Sold, 1895

Italy
- Name: Georges Valentine
- Owner: Mortola & Simonetti, Genoa
- In service: 1895
- Home port: Camogli
- Fate: Wrecked, 16 October 1904

General characteristics
- Tonnage: 882 GRT
- Length: 189 ft 7 in (57.79 m)
- Beam: 31 ft 2 in (9.50 m)
- Depth: 20 ft 5 in (6.22 m)
- Georges Valentine Shipwreck Site
- U.S. National Register of Historic Places
- Florida Underwater Archaeological Preserve
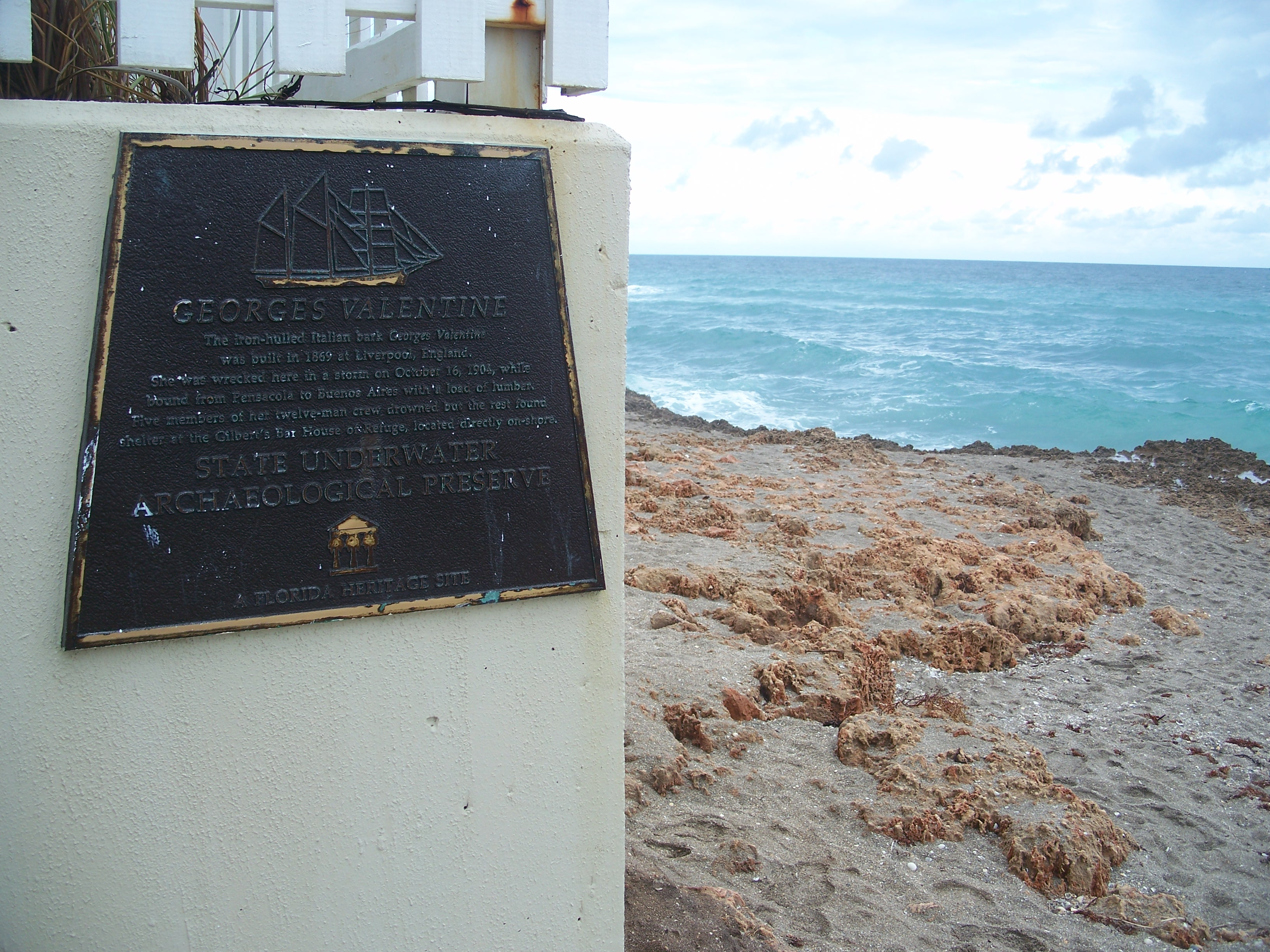

- Location within Florida Location within the United States
- Location: Hutchinson Island, Florida, Florida USA
- Coordinates: 27°11′55.8″N 80°9′49.8″W
- Built: 1869
- NRHP reference No.: 06000619
- FUAP No.: 11

Significant dates
- Added to NRHP: 19 July 2006
- Designated FUAP: 2006

The Georges Valentine Shipwreck Site is the site of the historic shipwreck of an Italian barkentine off the coast of Hutchinson Island in Martin County, Florida, with the nearest landmark being the House of Refuge at Gilbert's Bar.

The iron-hulled barque was built in Wallasey, England in 1869 by Bowdler Chaffer & Company for S. Meyers & Company. Originally christened Cape Clear with Lloyd's of London in 1870, she started her career as a screw steamboat with auxiliary sail carrying passengers on the Australia - Liverpool run. She was purchased by a French firm based in Bordeaux in 1889, re-christened Georges Valentine and turned into a sailing bark by being stripped of all steam machinery except the boiler. Rigged as a three-masted barkentine, she was then sold to a firm based in Dunkirk, northern France. In 1895, she was sold to Mortola & Simonetti, based in Genoa, Italy. She was based in Camogli, northern Italy and transported lumber regularly from Pensacola, Florida to South America.

In October 1904, the Georges Valentine, with a crew of twelve men commanded by Captain Prospero Mortola, sailed with a load of milled mahogany from Pensacola bound for Buenos Aires. On 13 October 1904 the ship sighted Havana, Cuba, but she later hit a storm in the Florida Straits and was blown up the Atlantic coast of Florida where on 16 October 1904, despite her crew's attempts to keep her in deeper water, she ran aground in shallow water and wrecked off Hutchinson Island near Gilbert's Bar. Five crew members perished. Their bodies were not recovered. The seven survivors found refuge at the House of Refuge just 100 yards (91 m) from the wreck site, where the House of Refuge's keeper, Captain William E. Rea, rendered aid to them.

On 19 July 2006, the Georges Valentine Shipwreck Site was added to the U.S. National Register of Historic Places. On 16 October 2006, it became the eleventh Florida Underwater Archaeological Preserve.
