= SS Tarpon =

- U.S. National Register of Historic Places
- Florida Underwater Archaeological Preserve
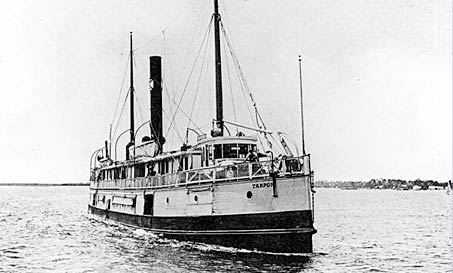
- Tarpon underway

- Location within Florida Location within the United States
- Location: Bay County, Florida, United States
- Nearest city: Panama City
- Coordinates: 30°5′42.12″N 85°56′33.3″W
- Built: 1887
- NRHP reference No.: 01000527
- FUAP No.: 6

Significant dates
- Added to NRHP: May 31, 2001
- Designated FUAP: 1997

SS Tarpon (originally called Naugatuck) was a ship which sank in 1937 near Panama City, Florida, United States. The shipwreck is located 7.8 nautical miles (14.4 km) off the shore of Panama City. It became the sixth Florida Underwater Archaeological Preserve when it was dedicated in 1997. In May 2001, it was added to the U.S. National Register of Historic Places.

== History ==
The twin-screwed steamship Tarpon was built in 1887, at Wilmington Delaware by shipbuilders Pusey and Jones. She was originally christened Naugatuck. She was 130 feet (40 m) long, and her beam was 26 feet (7.9 m). The superstructure and passenger areas of the vessel were wood and the hull was iron. She was powered by twin steam engines driving iron screws.

The ship was sent back to the manufacturer in 1891, after being sold by the original owner. The hull was lengthened by 30 feet (9.1 m) and she was renamed Tarpon. In 1902 she was sold to The Pensacola, St Andrews, and Gulf Steamship Company. Captain Willis Green Barrow took command, and captained the ship for 30 years.

Tarpon sailed weekly runs from Mobile, Pensacola, St. Andrews Bay, Apalachicola, and Carrabelle, making the trip 1,735 times. On September 1, 1937 Tarpon foundered two days after departing from Mobile with 200 tons of cargo and a crew of 25, and stopping in Pensacola. Despite a forecast of calm weather, the wind began to pick up, and the heavily-laden ship took on water in the high seas and sank while traveling to Panama City, Florida. Only one sailor, Addley Baker, survived and swam 25 miles (40 km) to shore, while the other 24 drowned.
