= Urca de Lima =

- U.S. National Register of Historic Places
- Florida Underwater Archaeological Preserve
- Location within Florida Location within the United States
- Location: St. Lucie County, Florida, United States
- Nearest city: Fort Pierce, Florida
- Coordinates: 27°30′19″N 80°17′57″W
- NRHP reference No.: 01000529
- FUAP No.: 1

Significant dates
- Added to NRHP: May 31, 2001
- Designated FUAP: 1987

Urca de Lima is a Spanish shipwreck (which sank in 1715) near Fort Pierce, Florida, United States. She was part of the 1715 Treasure Fleet, one of the numerous Spanish treasure fleets sailing between Spain and its colonies in the Americas. The wreck is located north of Fort Pierce Inlet, 200 yards off the shore from Jack Island Park. It became the first Florida Underwater Archaeological Preserve when dedicated in 1987. This was followed on May 31, 2001, with its addition to the U.S. National Register of Historic Places.

== Description and names ==
The original name of the ship was Santísima Trinidad. Her nickname Urca de Lima is derived from the Spanish term urca for cargo vessels and its owner Miguel de Lima y Melo. Another name for her being used in some historical sources is Nao de Refuerzo. This name might indicate that she got reinforced for traveling routes across the Atlantic. She was a Dutch-built merchant ship of 305 tons and used by the Spanish for cargo transport between Spain and its American colonies.

== Service and sinking ==
In 1712 Santísima Trinidad (Urca de Lima) belonged to a fleet of eight ships under the command of Juan Esteban de Ubilla, which sailed from Spain to the Americas to fetch goods and much needed bullion. The fleet arrived in Veracruz in December of the same year and due to various political and logistical issues it did not leave until the spring of 1715. In January 1715 Lima y Melo was promoted to captain of Santísima Trinidad by Ubilla and the ship got new masts and a hull cleaning. Some of the smaller ships were scrapped for parts to prepare the rest of the fleet for the crossing of the Atlantic. In May of the same year the four remaining ships (Nuestra Señora de la Regla (Capitana), Almiranta, San Cristobal de La Habana, Santísima Trinidad) finally set sail for Havana. After a difficult passage they arrived there at the beginning of July.

After repairs and some additional delay Ubilla's fleet departed from Havana on July 24 to head for Cadiz in Spain. The fleet had been augmented by an additional six Spanish ships under the command of Antonio de Echeverez and the French ship El Grifón tagging along for protection from pirates. The Spanish ships carried various goods from the Americas and from East Asia (via Mexico), a large amount of gold bullion and about 14 million pesos of silver. Urca de Lima, however, did not carry any gold or silver for the Spanish crown but mostly goods such as cowhides, chocolate, sassafras, incense and vanilla. In addition she also carried a few chests of private silver. A few days after leaving Havana the fleet ran into a hurricane that drove the ships towards the Florida coast and ultimately sank or grounded all them but one. The French El Grifón, which had sailed ahead, escaped without being aware of the fate of the rest of the fleet. More than half of the fleet's 2000 men including Ubilla and Echeverez died in the storm and some of the survivors later died of starvation, injuries and disease. The Urca de Lima fared better than the other Spanish ships, as she managed to steer into a river inlet near Fort Pierce, where she grounded on a sandbank but with the hull remaining intact. Due to this most of her cargo and provisions did not get lost and helped to feed the survivors in the days after the storm.

The survivors on the beach were organized by Admiral Francisco Salmón, who later oversaw the salvage operations continuing until April of the following year. A few men traveled North in a small boat that was salvaged from the remains of the fleet. Within a week they reached St. Augustine and informed the Spanish authorities about the loss of the 1715 treasure fleet. By the end of August relief ships from Havana arrived at the site of the sunken fleet. After Urca de Lima's cargo was salvaged, she was burned down to the waterline to hide her position from pirates and privateers of other nations, who had become aware of the sunken treasure fleet as well. In December the pirates Henry Jennings and Charles Vane captured a Spanish mail ship and got the exact position of the main Spanish salvage camp and Urca de Lima from her captain, Pedro de la Vega. They surprised the camp with a superior force and Salmón had no choice but to surrender the rest of the salvaged treasure that still remained in the camp. The pirates made off with about £87,500 of gold and silver.

== Discovery of the shipwreck ==
The shipwreck was discovered in 1928 by William J. Beach, close to the shore near Fort Pierce. The river inlet in which Urca de Lima originally grounded, however, did not exist anymore due to changes in the coastline. In 1932 the city council issued the first permit for a salvage operation. The last permits were issued in 1983 and 1984. The results of those salvage operations however were rather meager, since the Spanish salvaged most of the cargo in 1715. Only one bar of silver bullion, two silver wedges and a few cannons were recovered. The city council decided to turn the wreck into an archaeological preserve. For that purpose, archaeologists examined and mapped the wreck in 1985 and in 1987 Florida's first archaeological underwater preserve was opened. It was the first of the so-called Museums in the Sea. In 2001 the wreck was also included in the National Register of Historic Places.

== In popular culture ==
Urca de Lima is mentioned in the television series Black Sails (2014) as the main treasure the pirates are seeking. As the series is devised as a prequel to Robert Louis Stevenson's Treasure Island, the cargo of Urca de Lima ultimately becomes the basis for the treasure buried on Treasure Island by Captain Flint.
