= SS Copenhagen (1898) =

Steamship wreck near Lauderdale-by-the-Sea, Florida

History

United Kingdom
- Name: Copenhagen
- Namesake: Copenhagen
- Owner: Glasgow Shipowners' Co
- Operator: Glen & Co
- Port of registry: Glasgow
- Builder: J Priestman & Co, Sunderland
- Yard number: 72
- Launched: 24 February 1898
- Completed: March 1898
- Identification: UK official number 108711; code letters QBNL
- Fate: grounded 1900

General characteristics
- Type: cargo ship
- Tonnage: 3,297 GRT, 2,116 NRT
- Length: 325.0 ft (99.1 m)
- Beam: 47.0 ft (14.3 m)
- Depth: 25.6 ft (7.8 m)
- Decks: 1
- Installed power: 312 NHP
- Propulsion: 1 × triple-expansion engine; 1 × screw
- Sail plan: schooner
- Speed: 8 knots (15 km/h)
- Crew: 26
- SS Copenhagen
- U.S. National Register of Historic Places
- Florida Underwater Archaeological Preserve
- Location within Florida
- Location: Broward County, Florida, US
- Nearest city: Pompano Beach, Florida
- Coordinates: 26°12′20″N 80°05′06.46″W
- NRHP reference No.: 01000532
- FUAP No.: 5

Significant dates
- Added to NRHP: 31 May 2001
- Designated FUAP: June 1994

SS Copenhagen is a shipwreck off the town of Lauderdale-by-the-Sea, Florida, United States. She was a cargo steamship, built in England in 1898. She was wrecked on a reef south of Hillsboro Inlet in 1900.

== Building ==
John Priestman and Company of Sunderland, England, built Copenhagen as yard number 72. She was launched on 24 February 1898 and completed that March. She was built to a standard design that Priestman sold to various shipowners. Between 1896 and 1899, Priestman built yard numbers 56, 58, 59, 65, 66, 72, 75 and 78 all to the same dimensions, and all with engines of the same size and power.

Copenhagen's registered length was 325.0 ft (99.1 m), her beam was 47.0 ft (14.3 m) and her depth was 25.6 ft (7.8 m). Her tonnages were 3,297 GRT and 2,116 NRT. She had a single screw, driven by a three-cylinder triple-expansion engine built by William Allan and Company of Sunderland, that was rated at 312 NHP and gave her a speed of 8 knots (15 km/h). She also had masts, rigged as a schooner for sailing.

Copenhagen was completed for the Glasgow Shipowners' Company, Ltd, who appointed Glen and Company to manage her. She was registered at Glasgow, Scotland. Her United Kingdom official number was 108711 and her code letters were QBNL.

== Loss ==
On 20 May 1900 Copenhagen left Philadelphia carrying almost 5,000 tons of coal for Havana. She had a crew of 26. Her course followed the East Coast of the United States as far as Florida. On the night of 25–26 May she passed the Jupiter Inlet Light, and her Master, Captain William Jones, estimated her to be about 1 3/4 nautical miles (3.2 km) offshore. He ordered a course change to south-southeast to keep the ship at least 1 1/2 nautical miles (2.8 km) offshore. At about 04:20 hrs Jones retired, leaving his Chief Officer on watch.

At about 09:00 hrs on 26 May, Copenhagen struck Pompano Dropoff reef south of Hillsboro Inlet. Her engine was immediately stopped, and Jones ordered full astern, but she didn't move.

Two days later, a salvage vessel came to discharge Copenhagen's cargo to help float her off. Local people from ashore were employed to speed up transhipment of the coal. Copenhagen, however, stayed stuck on the reef. Her loss was estimated at $250,000, and her remaining cargo $12,500.

An inquiry found Jones at fault for failing to employ proper navigation, and for not taking soundings with his lead and line. However, due to his excellent record of service, and his co-operation with the investigation, the inquiry decided not to suspend his certificate.

== Hillsboro Inlet Light ==
A lighthouse for Hillsboro Inlet had been requested every year since 1884. In 1901, the year after Copenhagen foundered, Congress finally authorised it to be built. Funding was not fully appropriated until 1903. Hillsboro Inlet Light was completed in 1907.

== Wreck ==
Copenhagen's wreck is on Pompano Dropoff at a depth varying from 23 to 39 feet (7 to 12 m). During the Second World War, United States Navy fighter aircraft used it for target practice. Spent 50 caliber bullets can still be found at the site.

In June 1994 it was declared a Florida Underwater Archaeological Preserve. There is a plaque to this effect at the south end of the wreck. On 31 May 2001 it was added to the US National Register of Historic Places, with the reference number 01000532.
