= USS Narcissus (1863) =

Gunboat of the United States Navy

History

United States
- Name: USS Narcissus
- Launched: July 1863
- Acquired: by purchase, 23 September 1863
- Commissioned: 2 February 1864
- Fate: Sank, 4 January 1866

General characteristics
- Type: Steam gunboat
- Displacement: 101 long tons (103 t)
- Length: 81 ft 6 in (24.84 m)
- Beam: 18 ft 9 in (5.72 m)
- Draft: 6 ft (1.8 m)
- Depth of hold: 8 ft (2.4 m)
- Propulsion: Steam engine
- Speed: 14 kn (16 mph; 26 km/h)
- Complement: 19 officers and enlisted
- Armament: 1 × 20-pounder Parrott rifle, 1 × heavy 12-pounder
- U.S.S. Narcissus (tugboat) Shipwreck
- U.S. National Register of Historic Places
- Florida Underwater Archaeological Preserve
- Location within Florida Location within the United States
- Location: Egmont Key, Florida United States
- Coordinates: 27°37′28″N 82°48′3″W
- Built: 1863
- NRHP reference No.: 100003048
- FUAP No.: 12

Significant dates
- Added to NRHP: 15 October 2018
- Designated FUAP: 2015

USS Narcissus was a screw steamer launched in July 1863 as Mary Cook at East Albany, New York, United States. It was purchased by the Union Navy in New York City on September 23rd, 1863 from James D. Stevenson; and commissioned at New York Navy Yard on February 2nd, 1864, with Acting Ensign William G. Jones in command.

On 19 October 2018, the shipwreck was added to the National Register of Historic Places.

== Civil War ==
The new tug soon got underway south; and touched at Port Royal, South Carolina, for fuel on 14 February, before pushing on to the Gulf of Mexico. She joined the West Gulf Blockading Squadron at New Orleans late in the month and was assigned to patrol and blockade duty in Mississippi Sound. On the morning of 24 August, she captured sloop Oregon in Biloxi Bay, Mississippi Sound, and took the prize to New Orleans for adjudication.

Subsequently ordered to Mobile Bay, Narcissus supported clean-up operations following the great Union naval victory there on 5 August. She struck a Confederate torpedo off Mobile in a heavy storm on 7 December and sank within 15 minutes without loss of life.

Raised in the closing days of 1864, Narcissus was repaired at Pensacola early in 1865 and served in the gulf as a dispatch boat through the end of the war. She departed Pensacola on New Year's Day 1866, and ran aground during a gale northwest of Egmont Key, Florida on 4 January. When attempting to get off the bar the boiler exploded, destroying the ship with loss of all on board.

== Consideration as Florida's twelfth Underwater Archaeological Preserve ==
In December 2011, The Bureau of Archaeological Research, Division of Historical Resources, Florida Department of State, initiated a proposal to dedicate the wreck site of the Narcissus as Florida's twelfth Underwater Archaeological Preserve. The proposal was accepted and the shipwreck became an Underwater Archaeological Preserve in January 2015.
