= City of Hawkinsville (shipwreck) =

- U.S. National Register of Historic Places
- Florida Underwater Archaeological Preserve
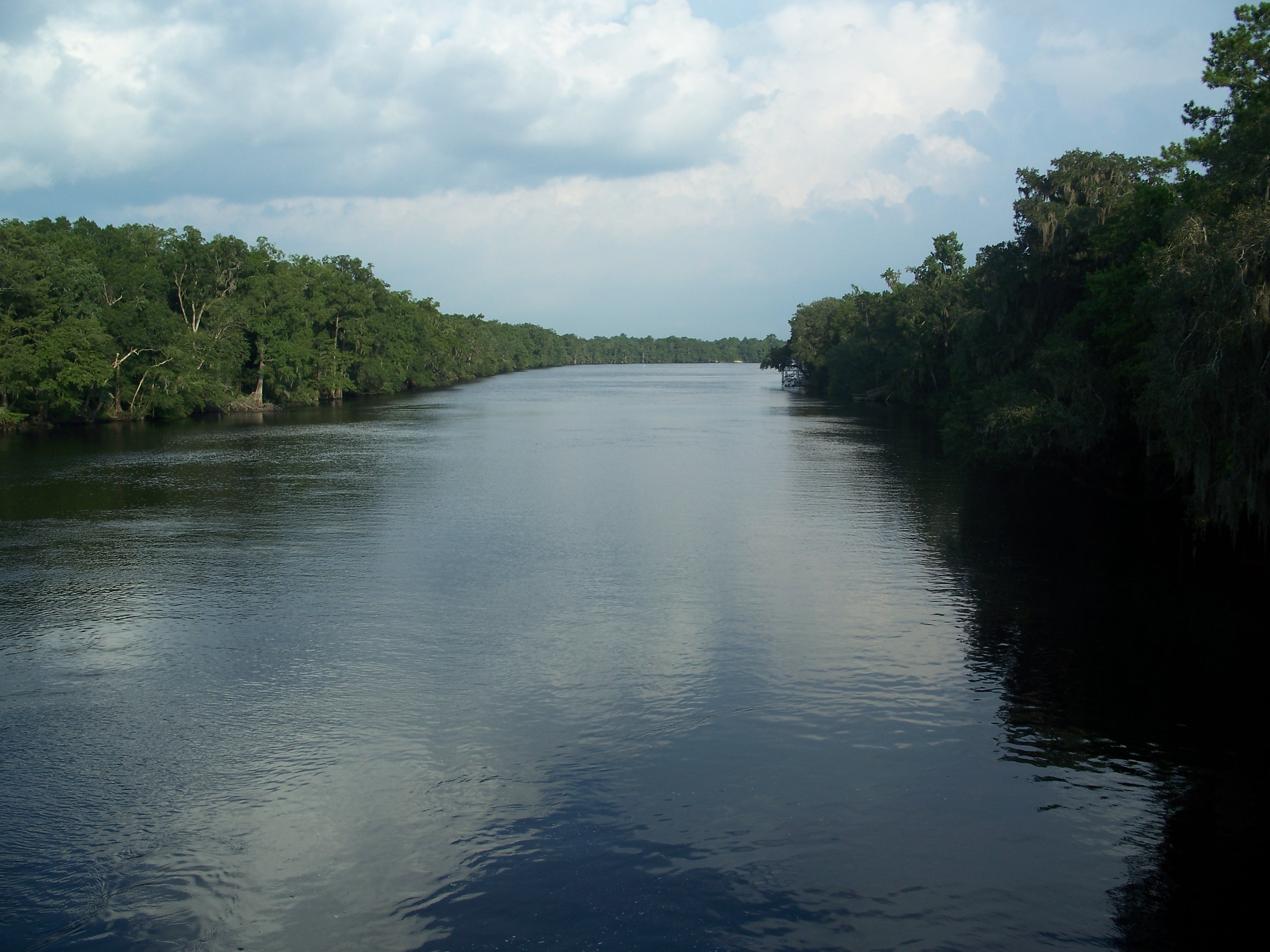
- Suwannee River, looking in the direction of City of Hawkinsville

- Location within Florida Location within the United States
- Location: Dixie County, Florida, United States
- Nearest city: Old Town, Florida
- Coordinates: 29°36′26″N 82°58′15″W
- Area: less than 1 acre (0.40 ha)
- Architectural style: 19th-century paddlewheel steamboat
- NRHP reference No.: 01000533
- FUAP No.: 3

Significant dates
- Added to NRHP: 31 May 2001
- Designated FUAP: 1992

City of Hawkinsville was a paddle steamer constructed in Georgia in 1886. Sold in 1900 to a Tampa, Florida company, it delivered cargo and lumber along the Suwannee River. Eventually rendered obsolete by the advent of railroads in the region, it was abandoned in the middle of the Suwannee in 1922.

It became the third Florida Underwater Archaeological Preserve when it opened to the public in 1992. On May 31, 2001, it was added to the U.S. National Register of Historic Places as City of Hawkinsville (shipwreck). It is located in Dixie County, 100 yards south of the Old Town railroad trestle (which is part of the Nature Coast State Trail).

== History ==
=== Georgia ===
In 1886, the Hawkinsville (Georgia) Deepwater Boat Lines had the wooden-hulled City of Hawkinsville built for them in Abbeville, Georgia.

After 14 years of service, they sold it to the Gulf Transportation Company of Tampa.

=== Florida ===
The largest (141 ft; 43 m long by 30 ft; 9.1 m wide) steamboat stationed on the Suwannee, City of Hawkinsville transported lumber and supplies from Branford to Cedar Key for the next two decades. Supplies included construction materials for the railroads that would end the need for the steamboat.

In 1922, the steamboat was abandoned in the Suwanee near what is now the railroad trestle built across the river, reducing the need for a boat to cross the river at that point. It remains at this location, preserved as one of the Florida Underwater Archaeological Preserves.

== Today ==
The wreck of the steamboat has become part of the river's ecosystem, and was added to the Florida Underwater Archaeological Preserve system in 1992. Most of it is remarkably intact, and rests on a ledge in the middle of the Suwannee, visible from the river's surface. Diving is allowed, but only for those with advanced open water certification; venturing within the wreck itself is not permitted.
