= Maple Leaf (shipwreck) =

- Maple Leaf (Passenger Steamer) (Wreck)
- U.S. National Register of Historic Places
- U.S. National Historic Landmark
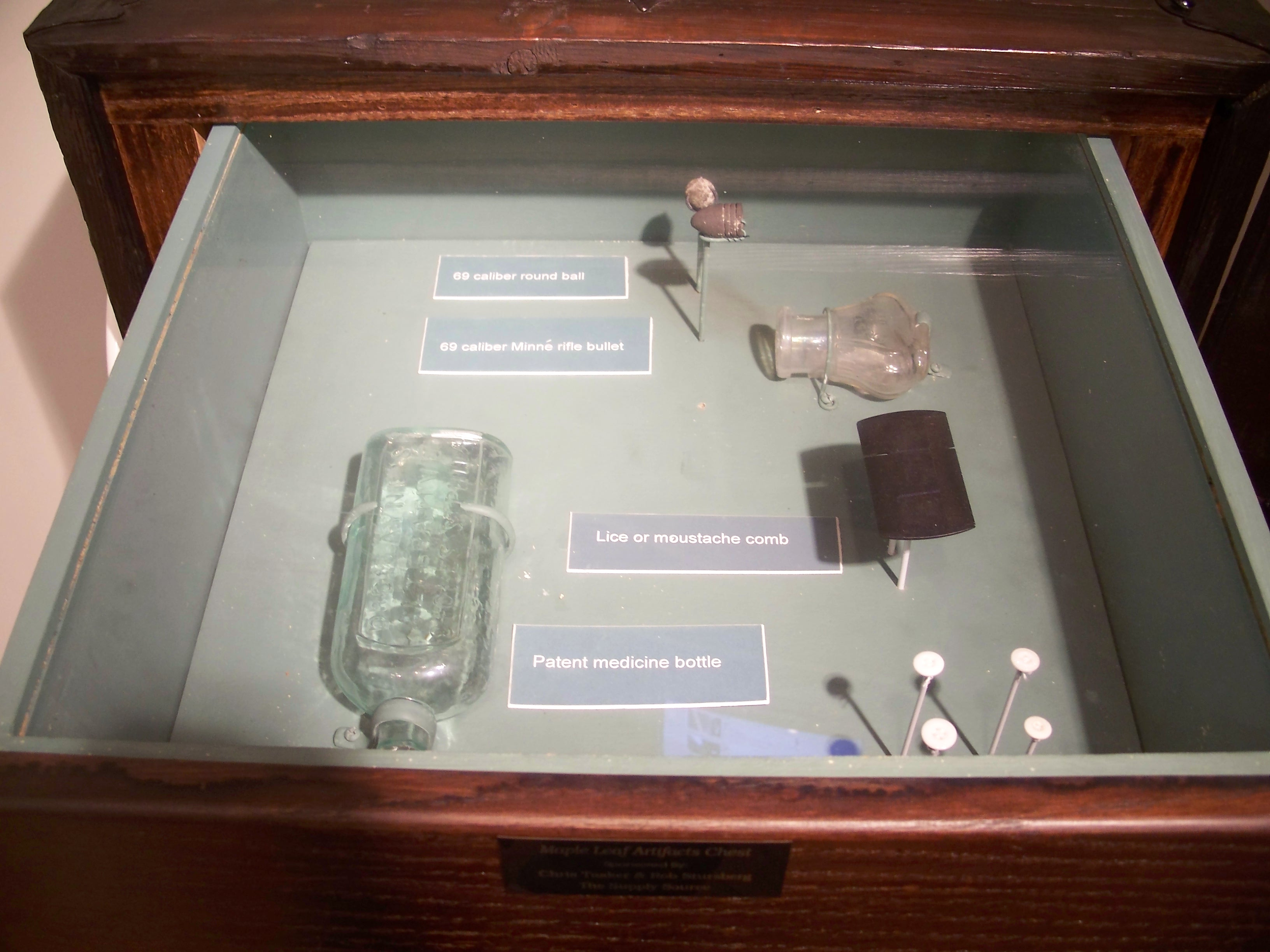
- Museum display of shipwreck artifacts

- Location within Florida Location within the United States
- Location: St. Johns River, Duval County, Florida, United States
- Nearest city: Jacksonville, Florida
- Coordinates: 30°09′31.0″N 81°40′49.7″W
- Area: less than one acre
- NRHP reference No.: 94001650

Significant dates
- Added to NRHP: October 12, 1994
- Designated NHL: October 12, 1994

Maple Leaf is a United States National Historic Landmark in Jacksonville, Florida, United States. Maple Leaf, a side paddlewheel steamship, was first launched as a freight and passenger vessel from the Marine Railway Yard in Kingston, Upper Canada in 1851. The 181-foot (55 m) sidewheel paddle steamer measured 24.7-foot (7.5 m) at the beam.

== Sinking ==
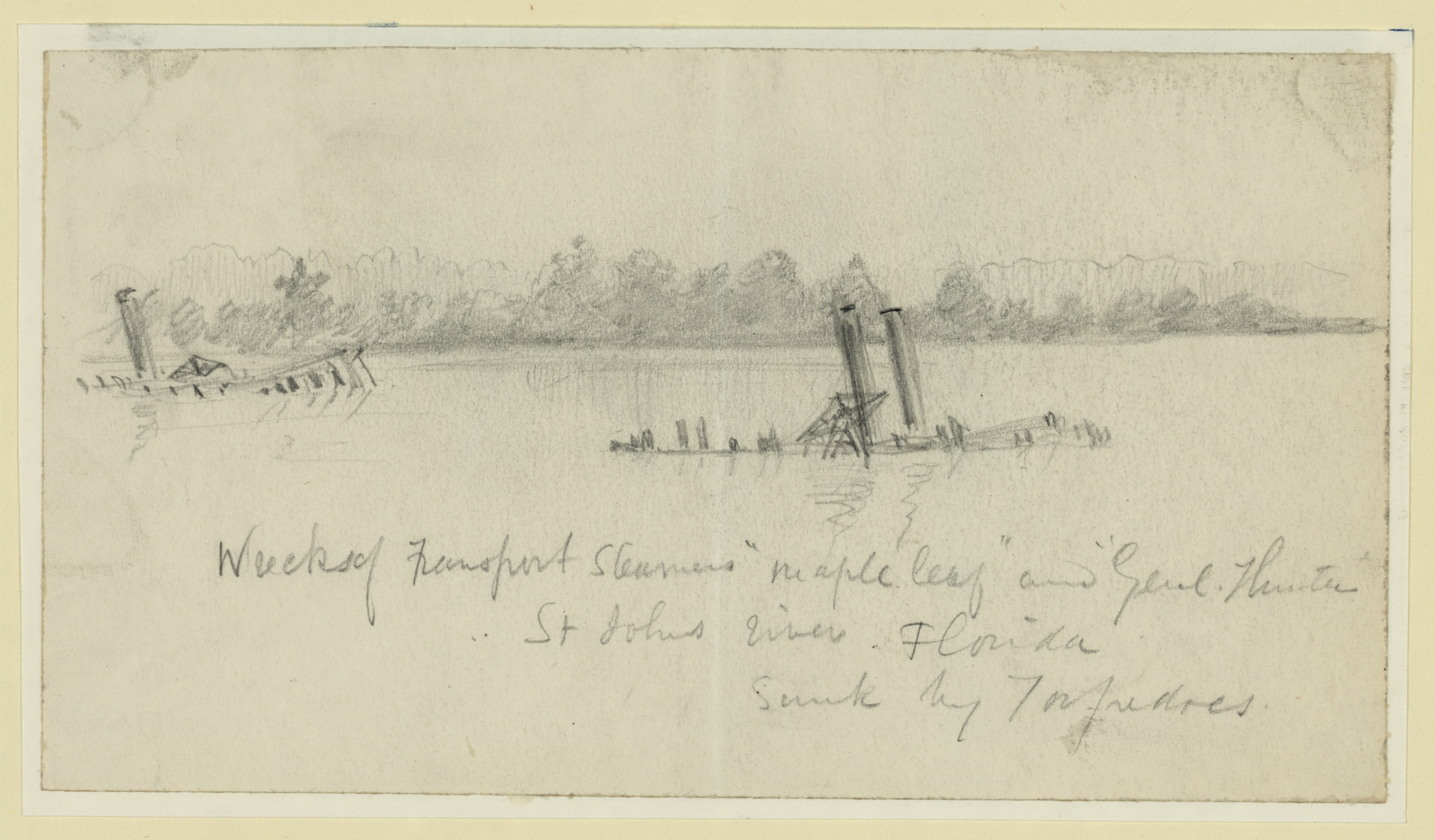
Wreck of Transport Steamers "Maple leaf" and "Genl. Hunter". St. Johns river. Florida, Sunk by torpedoes

Maple Leaf was a civilian merchant steamship, chartered as a transport by the Union Army during American Civil War, that struck a Confederate torpedo - what we would now call a mine - as she was crossing the St. Johns River near Jacksonville on April 1, 1864. Four crew members lost their lives in the sinking. This was the first mine casualty of the war. The screw steamer USS Norwich was dispatched to assess the condition of the wreck on April 2, and Captain Henry W. Dale concluded his ship and cargo as a total loss.

== Wreck ==
Maple Leaf′s wreck site is located in the St. Johns River, to the west of the adjacent Mandarin neighborhood, in southeastern Duval County. The wreck was deemed a threat to river navigation so the U.S. Army Corps of Engineers had all structural components above the ship's main deck removed to clear the channel in the 1880s. The shipwreck was rediscovered by the St. Johns Archaeological Expeditions, Inc. in 1984. Volunteers identified the wreck in 1984. The shipwreck site has been given the Smithsonian trinomial 8DU8032.

Because of the wreck's remarkable state of preservation (down to the line cleared in the 1880s), it is the most significant Civil War-era shipwreck yet discovered, and a good example of a mid-19th century Great Lakes steamer. On October 12, 1994, it was designated a National Historic Landmark. National Historic Landmark plaque located at 30° 19.461′ N, 81° 39.683′ W.

== See also ==
- List of National Historic Landmarks in Florida
- National Register of Historic Places listings in Duval County, Florida
