= Emanuel Point Shipwreck Site =

- U.S. National Register of Historic Places
- Location within Florida Location within the United States
- Location: Escambia County, Florida, USA
- Nearest city: Pensacola, Florida
- Coordinates: 30.34°N 87.23°W
- NRHP reference No.: 96000227
- Added to NRHP: March 4, 1996

The Emanuel Point Shipwreck Site is a historic site near Pensacola, Florida, United States. It is located off Emanuel Point. It has been identified as the galleon San Juan, of the fleet that carried conquistador Tristan de Luna and his army to La Florida in 1559. It sank along with most of the fleet during a hurricane that struck the coast shortly after Luna's arrival. On March 4, 1996, it was added to the U.S. National Register of Historic Places.
