= Just Mayo =

Vegan condiment brand

Nutritional value per 1 Tablespoon (14g)
- Energy: 90 kcal (380 kJ)
- Carbohydrates: 1 g
- Fat: 10 g
- Saturated: 0.5 g
- Trans: 0 g
Vitamins and minerals
Minerals	Quantity %DV^{†}
Sodium	0%.105 mg
- Other constituents: Quantity
- Energy from fat: 90 kcal (380 kJ)
- Cholesterol: 0
- ^{†}Percentages estimated using US recommendations for adults.

Just Mayo is an egg substitute mayonnaise-like produced by Eat Just, Inc, formerly known as Hampton Creek. Just Mayo was first released in Northern California Whole Foods Markets on September 19, 2013. Just Mayo comes in original, wasabi, truffle, sesame ginger, garlic, chipotle and sriracha flavors. It has been described as "a vegan spread that has rattled the egg industry."

== History ==
Just Mayo was formulated in 2011 by Josh Tetrick, who invested $37,000 into the business of finding a cheaper alternative to eggs through his ventures Beyond Eggs and Hampton Creek. In 2014, Hampton Creek purchased hundreds of bottles of its own mayonnaise from grocery stores across the United States, and instructed contractors to place calls inquiring about products as customers to increase the perceived popularity of its products. The company was renamed JUST, inc. in 2017. Bill Gates and Li Ka-shing became backers of the company.

Just Mayo does not contain eggs; the formula took approximately two years to create. The research and development team at Hampton Creek screened 1,500 plants before discovering eleven that were suitable for the emulsification purposes in a mayonnaise. The plant that replaces the egg in Just Mayo is a specific variety of the Canadian yellow field pea (a type of split pea).

== Production and distribution milestones ==
In October 2013, Just Mayo was produced by a copacker located in Seattle and Tennessee and distributed to Whole Foods across the United States by distribution company United Natural Foods.

In October 2014, Just Mayo was available in at least six grocery store chains in the United States, including Whole Foods, Kroger, Safeway, ShopRite, Target and Costco.

By early 2019, the product was extremely hard to find and not carried in any of these retailers, but distribution improved in the second half of the year.

While Just Mayo was still listed on the Eat Just website as of November 12, 2020, as of December 2020 all products (with the exception of Just Egg) had been removed from the website.

== Labelling controversy ==
In 2014, Unilever (parent company of competing brand Hellmann's/Best Foods) filed a lawsuit against Hampton Creek for false advertising, arguing that Just Mayo cannot be marketed as mayonnaise because it does not meet the definition of the product specified by the Food and Drug Administration. The FDA requires that "mayonnaise" contain 65% vegetable oil and at least one egg yolk-containing ingredient; Just Mayo contains ingredients such as pea protein, beta-carotene, and modified food starch, none of which are used in mayonnaise according to FDA standards. Unilever also noted the use of egg-oriented imagery in its promotional materials, and stated that its false claims were "part of a larger campaign and pattern of unfair competition by Hampton Creek to falsely promote Just Mayo spread as tasting better than, and being superior to, Best Foods and Hellmann's mayonnaise." Hampton Creek CEO Josh Tetrick denied any wrongdoing, believing that Unilever's lawsuit was meant to solely hinder competition. Unilever ultimately dropped the lawsuit so Hampton Creek could work with "industry groups and appropriate regulatory authorities" on resolving its labelling, while also complimenting the company for its "commitment to innovation and its inspired corporate purpose."

In August 2015, the FDA sent Hampton Creek a formal warning that Just Mayo's labeling was misleading due to the product not meeting the standards for "mayonnaise", and because of wording on the packaging and promotional materials that contained an "implied health claim that these products can reduce the risk of heart disease due to the absence of cholesterol," which cannot be included as it contains too much fat to be promoted with such statements.

In December 2015, Hampton Creek announced that it had agreed to revise its packaging for Just Mayo in order to comply with the FDA's recommendations. The new label contains more prominent statements surrounding the nature of the product, and contains an explanation that the word "Just" in the product's name is defined as being "guided by reason, justice, and fairness."

In October 2016, it was reported that the American Egg Board and its affiliates "launched a secret two-year war against the vegan mayonnaise competitor", spending at least $59,500 to counter publicity about Just Mayo's products. This led to a federal investigation by the USDA's Agricultural Marketing Service, which condemned the American Egg Board "for overstepping its congressional mandate."

== See also ==
- List of brand name condiments
- List of mayonnaises
