= This Is Your Brain on Drugs =

US anti-drug campaign

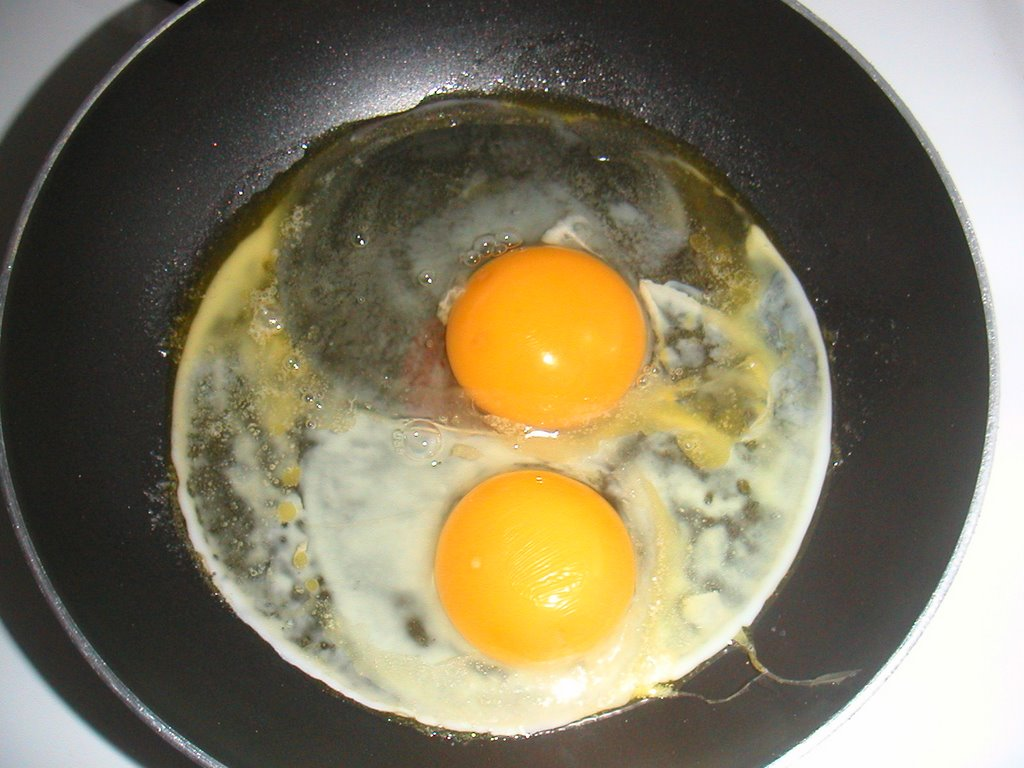
The advertisements compare the brain to an egg, and suggest that using drugs is like cracking it open and frying it in a hot pan.

This Is Your Brain on Drugs was a large-scale anti-narcotics campaign in the United States that was launched in 1987 by the Partnership for a Drug-Free America (PDFA). The campaign's messaging likens an egg to the viewer's brain, then cracks and fries the egg as a voiceover announces, "This is your brain on drugs". The campaign involved included three televised public service announcements (PSAs) and a series of related posters.

== 1987 version ==
The 30-second version of the first PSA, from 1987, shows a man (played by John Roselius) in a kitchen who asks if there is anyone out there who still does not understand the dangers of drug abuse. He holds up an egg and says, "This is your brain," before motioning to a frying pan and adding, "This is drugs." He then cracks open the egg, fries the contents, and says, "This is your brain on drugs." Finally, he looks up at the camera and asks, "Any questions?"

In contrast, the 10-second and 15-second versions simply show a close-up of an egg dropping into a frying pan. This is accompanied by a voice-over saying in the 15-second version: "Okay, last time. This is drugs. This is your brain on drugs. Any questions?" The 10-second version omits the first sentence.

The PSA, titled "Frying Pan" (a.k.a. "Fried Egg" and "Any Questions?"), was conceived by art directors Scot Fletcher and Rick Bell, copywriter Larre Johnson and creative director Paul Keye at Los Angeles-based agency keye/donna/pearlstein. It was directed by Joe Pytka through his own Venice-based production company Pytka Productions and produced by agency producer Harvey Greenberg, Pytka executive producer Jane McCann and Pytka producer John Turney. Anthony Marinelli scored the shorter versions.

== 1997 version ==
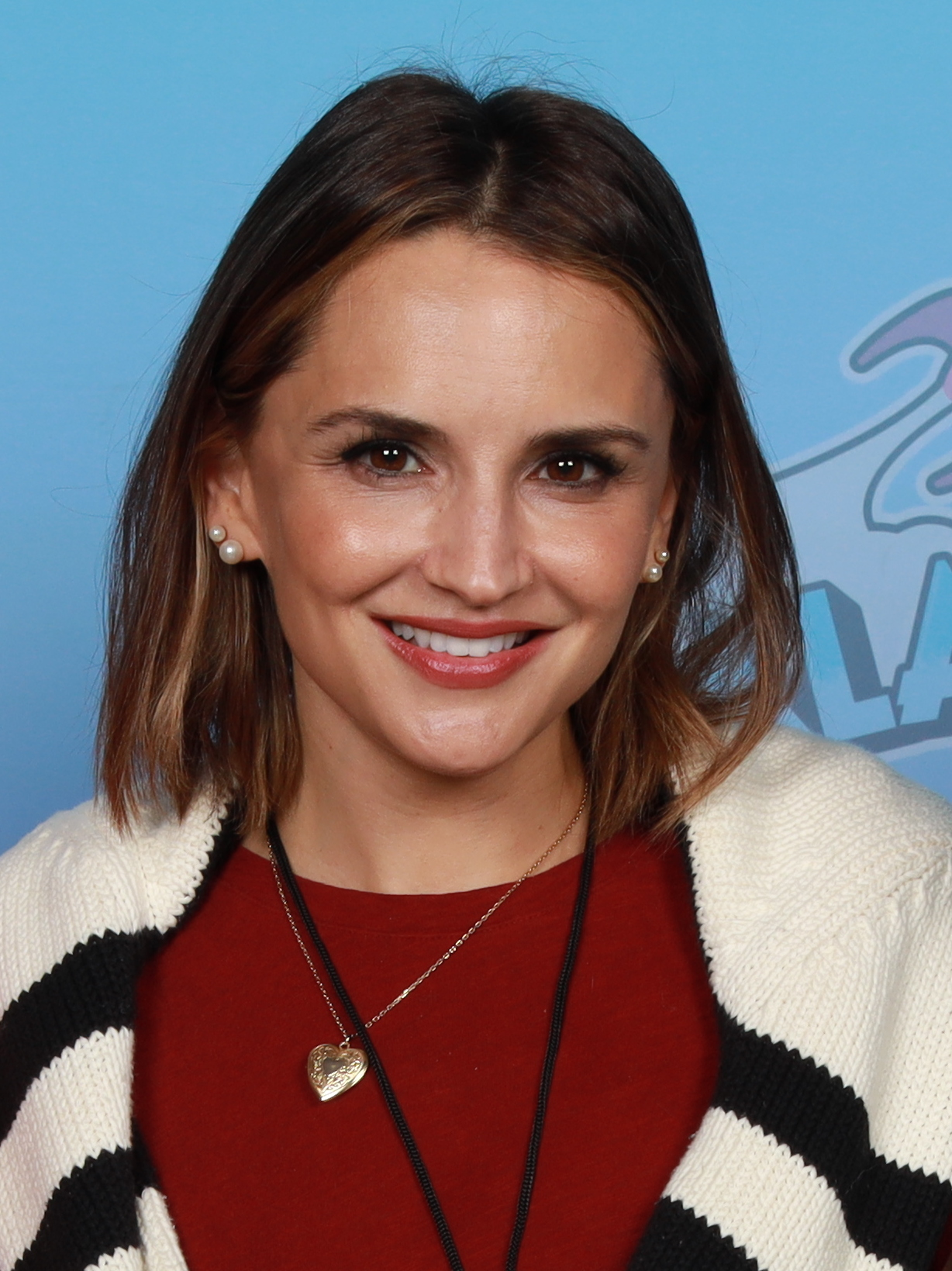
The 1997 version of the PSA stars Rachael Leigh Cook (pictured in 2024), a role she would later parody on the animated series Robot Chicken

The second PSA, from 1997, featured 18-year-old actress Rachael Leigh Cook, who, as before, holds up an egg and says, "this is your brain", before lifting up a frying pan with the words, "and this is heroin", after which she places the egg on a kitchen counter—"this is what happens to your brain after snorting heroin"—and slams the pan down on it. She lifts the pan back up, saying, "and this is what your body goes through", in reference to the remnants of the smashed egg now dripping from the bottom of the pan and down her arm. Cook then says, "Wait, It's not over yet", and proceeds to smash everything in the kitchen with the frying pan in a rage, yelling "this is what your family goes through! And your friends! And your money! And your job! And your self-respect! And your future!" She ends with "And your life". Cook then drops the pan on the counter and says, "Any questions?"

This PSA, likewise titled "Frying Pan", was conceived by art director Doug Hill, copywriter Ken Cills and creative director Graham Turner at New York-based agency Margeotes/Fertitta & Partners. It was directed by Eden Tyler through New York-based production company Zooma Zooma, produced by agency producer Ed Kleban and Zooma Zooma producer Joseph Mantegna and edited by Jay Nelson at Santa Monica-based Avenue Edit.

== 2016 version ==
The third PSA, from 2016, is a loose remake which shows an egg in a human hand, stating "This is your brain", alongside a frying pan that the other hand is pointing to, stating, "This is drugs." The egg is then cracked, then poured into the pan and fried, with the narration, "This is your brain on drugs. Any questions?" This is followed by scenes of teens, some of whom state, "Um, yeah, I have questions", "Prescription drugs aren't as bad as street drugs, right?", "Weed's legal, isn't it?", "Drinking is worse than smoking weed, isn't it?", "Why is heroin so addictive?", "Molly just makes you feel happy", "I have questions", "Mom, Dad, did you ever try drugs?" The narrator returns to say, "They're going to ask. Be ready."

== 2017 War on Drugs Critique version ==
In 2017, Rachael Leigh Cook used imagery from the This is Your Brain on Drugs commercials in a PSA by the Drug Policy Alliance. The PSA critiqued the war on drugs and its contribution to mass incarceration, structural racism and poverty. The ad was posted to YouTube on April 20, 2017 in recognition of 4/20.

== Analysis ==
TV Guide named the commercial one of the top one hundred television advertisements of all time, and Entertainment Weekly named it the 8th best commercial of all time.

== Impact ==
As of June 2025, the Partnership for a Drug Free America's successor organization Partnership to End Addiction describes "Fried Egg" as being among its "iconic PSAs."

=== Consumerism ===
A poster produced in the early 1990s called "Famous Brains on Drugs" parodied the concept by having eggs appear in the frying pan in forms intended to remind the viewer of certain people. For instance, a pan labeled "Saddam Hussein" had an egg with a crosshair over it, and a pan labeled "Milli Vanilli" contained a box of imitation eggs. There have also been parody T-shirts, such as versions based on The Simpsons ("This is your brain on donuts", showing an X-ray of Homer Simpson's head) and the Red Sox–Yankees rivalry (shirts targeted to both allegiances of the famed rivalry), among others.

=== In media ===
This Is Your Brain on Drugs has been widely parodied in various forms, including a Saturday Night Live skit which parodied the PSA, adding "with a side of bacon" to the commercial's tagline.

==== Television ====
In an episode of the sitcom Roseanne, the title character reenacts the PSA while having a conversation with one of her children about drugs.

In Living Color parodied the PSA with Oprah Winfrey, played by Kim Wayans.

In the eighteenth episode of the fourth season of the sitcom Married... with Children, "What Goes Around Comes Around" (1990), the character Al Bundy takes an egg, says "This is your brain," then says "This is your brain on marriage," drops it on the ground, and asks, "Any questions?"

An episode of the teen series Beverly Hills, 90210 ends with the characters Brandon and Brenda Walsh acting out the PSA with their friends in their favorite diner. After the show, the actual 30-second commercial aired, and Jason Priestley delivered his own anti-drug message on the air.

PBS Kids did a parody of the famous PSA as well, in a short interstitial segment shown in between programs in place of commercials titled "This is your brain on books", in which an egg falls onto a frying pan with open books on it, then falls into a boy`s head, in which he thinks about composing, computing, and creating. A distorted voice ends it all with "Any questions?".

The second version was satirized in the series premiere of the animated television sketch show Robot Chicken, "Junk in the Trunk" (2005). Rachael Leigh Cook (who provided the voice acting) goes on a psychopathic rampage, destroying everything she encounters, ending eventually with her smashing herself in the head and falling down a building.

In the tenth episode of the second season of "Breaking Bad", the character Jesse Pinkman is seen preparing breakfast for himself and the character Jane Margolis, saying "this is your brain, this is your brain on drugs" while pouring chicken eggs on a skillet.

==== Music ====
The cover of Primus' 1990 album Frizzle Fry showed a sculpture of a brain melting in a frying pan and was meant to be a play on the commercial.

English virtual band Gorillaz used the PSA in the music video for their 2017 single "Sleeping Powder".

The teaser for the 2019 "No Drug Like Me" music video by Carly Rae Jepsen re-stages the 1997 version PSA, which featured actor Rachael Leigh Cook.

The music video for Demi Lovato's 2022 single "Substance" features a recreation of the PSA.

==== Books ====
The title of the popular science book This Is Your Brain On Music: The Science of a Human Obsession (2006) by Daniel Levitin is a nod to the PSA.

==== Other media ====
A 2011 CBS Cares PSA parodied this in talking about sunburn, which showed a slice of uncooked bacon that accompanied a voice saying "This is your skin", and a slice of it was then placed in a frying pan, cooking it, stating "This is your skin in the sun", and then follows it by a shot of a sun in which the voice says "Any questions?", accompanied by the phrase "Save your bacon. Use sunscreen." superimposed over the sun.

The Nostalgia Critic placed the ad at number three on his "Top 11 Drug PSAs" list, noting that everyone he knew had a "witty retort" to the commercial's signature "any questions?" After demonstrating a few comebacks, he then watches Rachael Leigh Cook's version of the PSA, responding to her manic performance with a shocked "What the hell kind of drugs are you on?"

In 2012, two PSAs based on the PDFA campaign were released by Tea Party activist Herman Cain. The violent death of a goldfish and a rabbit were supposed to represent what President Obama's stimulus plan did to the American economy.

In some versions of the Tony Hawk's video games, "This is your brain on drugs" is one of several messages that will appear when skating out of bounds.

=== Criticism ===
The American Egg Board took issue with the PSA, claiming that eggs were being correlated with the unhealthiness of drug use. The board worried that young children might misinterpret the TV message and believe that eggs were harmful.

Comedian Bill Hicks spoke negatively about the commercial frequently during his stand-up routine, claiming "I've seen a lot of weird shit on drugs, I've never ever ever ever ever looked at an egg and thought it was a fucking brain."

== See also ==
- Just Say No
- I learned it by watching you!
