= Hill Holliday =

Marketing and communications agency

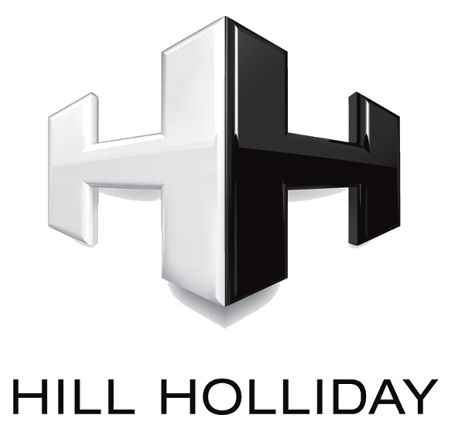
- Company type: Subsidiary
- Industry: advertising agency
- Founded: 1968
- Founder: Jack Connors, Jay Hill, Steve Cosmopulos and Alan Holliday
- Headquarters: 2 Dry Dock; Boston, Massachusetts, United States
- Key people: Chris Wallrapp, CEO
- Parent: Attivo
- Website: www.hhcc.com

Hill Holliday (HH) is a marketing and communications agency based in Boston, Massachusetts with offices in New York City and Greenville, South Carolina. It is the 17th largest advertising agency in the U.S.

== History ==
Hill Holliday was founded in Boston in 1968 as Hill, Holliday, Connors, Cosmopulos, Inc. by partners Jack Connors, Jay Hill, Steve Cosmopulos and Alan Holliday. It was acquired by IPG in 1998, and sold to Attivo in 2024.

== Awards ==
The agency was named Media Magazine's full-service Agency of the Year for 2011 and 2012, and is the only agency to win Adweek's Media Plan of the Year four years in a row.

== Notable work ==
- Dunkin Donuts: "America Runs on Dunkin"
- Bank of America: "Life's Better When We're Connected"
- Cigna: "GO YOU"
- Partnership for Drug-Free Kids: WeGotYou
- AMD K6/K6-2: "Trucks", "Diabolical", and "Flatzone"
