= Note from Mom =

American anti-cannabis public service announcements

"Note from Mom" (also known as "Rolling Papers") and "Rough Night" are anti-cannabis public service announcements created by the United States Office of National Drug Control Policy (ONDCP). The spoken slogan is "Get tough, get creative, just get through" and is presented with a written slogan "Action: the anti-drug" and URL, theantidrug.com, (Note: redirects to drugfree.org, Partnership for Drug-Free Kids, as of 2018) and an ONDCP toll-free telephone number. The ads, targeted at parents, were found by a research study to be relatively ineffective in influencing teenagers' behavior.
