= Jennifer Skiff =

American author, journalist and television producer

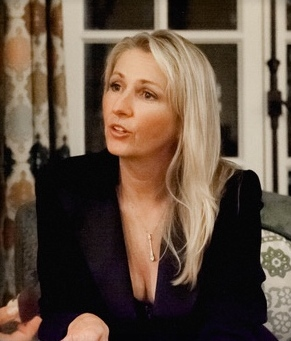
- Born: 1961 (age 64–65); Boston, MA
- Occupations: Writer; Journalist; Television producer Animal advocate
- Writing career
- Period: 1986-present
- Genre: Nonfiction
- Notable works: God Stories; The Divinity of Dogs; Rescuing Ladybugs
- Website: jenniferskiff.com

Jennifer Skiff (born 1961) is an American author, journalist and television producer, best known for writing inspirational books and animal welfare diplomacy.

== Early life and education ==
Skiff was born in Boston, Massachusetts, and raised in Bar Harbor, Maine. Growing up, her family had pet dogs, and she has said she received emotional healing from dogs. Skiff is a graduate of Hebron Academy, a college preparatory boarding school located in Hebron, Maine. She graduated from Texas Christian University in 1983 with a double major in broadcast journalism and criminal justice.

== Career ==
=== Television ===
Skiff began her career at WTVX-TV in Fort Pierce, Florida, and also worked as an anchor and reporter at WABI-TV in Bangor, Maine, and covered crime at KUTV in Salt Lake City, Utah. Wildlife Minutes, a television series she developed that highlighted the plight of endangered and threatened species, premiered on the Discovery Channel in 1987. She worked as an investigative correspondent and producer for CNN for 14 years, and was a producer on the channel's environmental program Earth Matters. As a segment producer for TBS's Network Earth, she was nominated for a 1992 CableACE Award for magazine show special or series, and received an Environmental Media Award for TV News Magazine Segment as correspondent and writer for the series in 1996.

=== Books ===
==== God Stories: Inspiring Encounters With the Divine ====
Skiff started working on her first book, God Stories: Inspiring Encounters With the Divine, after what she described as a miraculous recovery from bone marrow cancer at the age of 32. It was published by Random House in 2008 and includes 100 stories of encounters with God, which she collected from people of various faiths, backgrounds and nationalities. Publishers Weekly called it "mysterious and faith-inspiring" and "inspiring if uneven". It was excerpted on Today.com.

==== The Divinity of Dogs: True Stories of Miracles Inspired by Man's Best Friend ====
Her second book, The Divinity of Dogs: True Stories of Miracles Inspired by Man's Best Friend, was published by Simon & Schuster on October 23, 2012. The book is a compilation of inspirational stories about dogs gathered from people's submissions. It reached number 8 on the Toronto Star nonfiction bestseller list in April 2015. The Divinity of Dogs was based on submissions Skiff received when writing God Stories. Starting in 2010, she spent over a year collecting submissions, photos, and interviews. The stories are told from the point of view of the dog owners. The book has a musical companion, The Divinity of Dogs: Music to Calm Dogs and the People Who Love Them, created by Skiff and pianist George Skaroulis.

==== Rescuing Ladybugs: Inspirational Encounters with Animals That Changed the World ====
Skiff's third book, Rescuing Ladybugs: Inspirational Encounters with Animals That Changed the World, published by New World Library in 2018, highlights the true stories of remarkable people who didn't look away from seemingly impossible to change situations, and describes how their lives have been enriched while they've worked to save animals. Leaders in what Skiff calls the Compassion Movement, their stories illustrate how we can break barriers to improve all life on earth.

From Rescuing Ladybugs: "There's an honorable war being fought in our world for animals. In it, the good are going after the evil, the generous are taking aim at the greedy, and the kind are blanketing the cruel. I refer to it as the compassion movement because it's fueled by a desire to alleviate suffering."

In the book, Skiff says that in 2018 "there are more laws and corporate policies protecting farm animals than ever before, and more consumers are leaving animals off their plates and eating plant-based meals instead. This colossal shift is due to Josh Balk and other leaders in the compassion movement who confront cruelty head-on, using common sense and innovation."

In the book, Skiff says "There are many leaders in the compassion movement — too many to profile in one book. These are the people we admire for their ability to see the roots of problems and develop effective strategies for fixing them, as well as for their courage to combat greed when it inevitably clashes with compassion. They are the visionaries, pacesetters, and analytical thinkers whose unexpected connections with animals are driving sweeping change throughout the world."

In the book, Skiff notes Jill Robinson, co-founder of Animals Asia as "leading the compassion movement on the largest continent on earth – Asia".

Michael W. Fox, veterinarian and author, on Rescuing Ladybugs: "Rescuing Ladybugs is an exceptional book - a clarion call to awaken our empathy, ignite compassionate action, and help recover our humanity in these dystopian times. It should be required reading."

=== Animal advocacy ===
Skiff co-authored the position paper that led to West Australian Parliament passing sweeping laws to end puppy farming that included, mandatory spay/neuter of dogs before the age of two-years-old, mandatory dog breeder registration, a centralized government dog registration system, and the transitioning of pet shops into adoption centers.

Skiff is the Director of International of Animal Wellness Action, an organization that champions legal standards that forbid animal cruelty, and the Center for a Humane Economy, an animal welfare charity. In 2025, as director of the Kangaroos Are Not Shoes campaign for the Center for a Humane Economy, Skiff led successful efforts resulting in major athletic wear companies ending their use of kangaroo leather. Adidas announced in May 2025 that it had ceased sourcing kangaroo skins for athletic shoes, with Skiff calling the decision "a historic milestone in animal protection and corporate responsibility. This sends a clear message: compassion is not a compromise. Cruelty has no place in commerce.” ASICS followed suit, with Skiff, identified as director of international programs at the Center for a Humane Economy, noting that "ASICS has acknowledged a fundamental truth: the commercial slaughter of wild kangaroos for their skins is neither ethical nor morally defensible." The campaign also influenced Mizuno, Umbro, Sokito, New Balance, Puma, and Nike to announce plans to end or phase out kangaroo leather use.

After witnessing atrocities perpetrated on bears, Skiff initiated and led the successful campaign to build the first bear sanctuary in Laos. In Indonesia, she negotiated the release of 12 chained monkeys into their native habitat from a hotel zoo, an initiative that shuttered the zoo six months later.

In 2022, she began work as consultant to the Prime Minister of Morocco on a kingdom-wide initiative to eradicate rabies humanely by the method of trap, neuter, vaccinate, return of street dogs.

== Professional associations ==
- Center for a Humane Economy, Director of International
- Animal Wellness Action, Director of International Programs
- Humane Society of the United States, Chair, Maine State Council
- SPCA of Hancock County: Chair, SPCAHC Trustee Council
- Animal Aid USA, Adviser
- Institute for Humane Education, Adviser
- Dogs' Refuge Home WA, Australia, President, Trustee

== Bibliography ==
- God Stories: Inspiring Encounters With the Divine (Penguin Random House / Harmony Books, 2008)
- The Divinity of Dogs: True Stories of Miracles Inspired by Man's Best Friend (Simon & Schuster / Atria Books, 2012)
- Rescuing Ladybugs: Inspirational Encounters with Animals That Changed the World (New World Library, 2018)

== Personal life ==
Skiff splits her time living between Maine, USA, and Perth, Western Australia. She is a former president and trustee of the Dogs' Refuge Home, a no-kill shelter in Australia, and works with charities around the world to help abused and abandoned animals.

Skiff was featured in the book, One Hundred & One Reasons to Get Out of Bed: Small World Steps, Big Planet Heroes by Barbara Royal and Natasha Milne.
