= Tetrick =

Tetrick is a surname. Notable people with the surname include:

- Alison Tetrick (born 1985), American racing cyclist
- Harry W. Tetrick (1911–1977), American sound engineer
- Josh Tetrick (born 1980), American entrepreneur
- Tim Tetrick (born 1982), American harness racer
