= Frederick D. Sulcer =

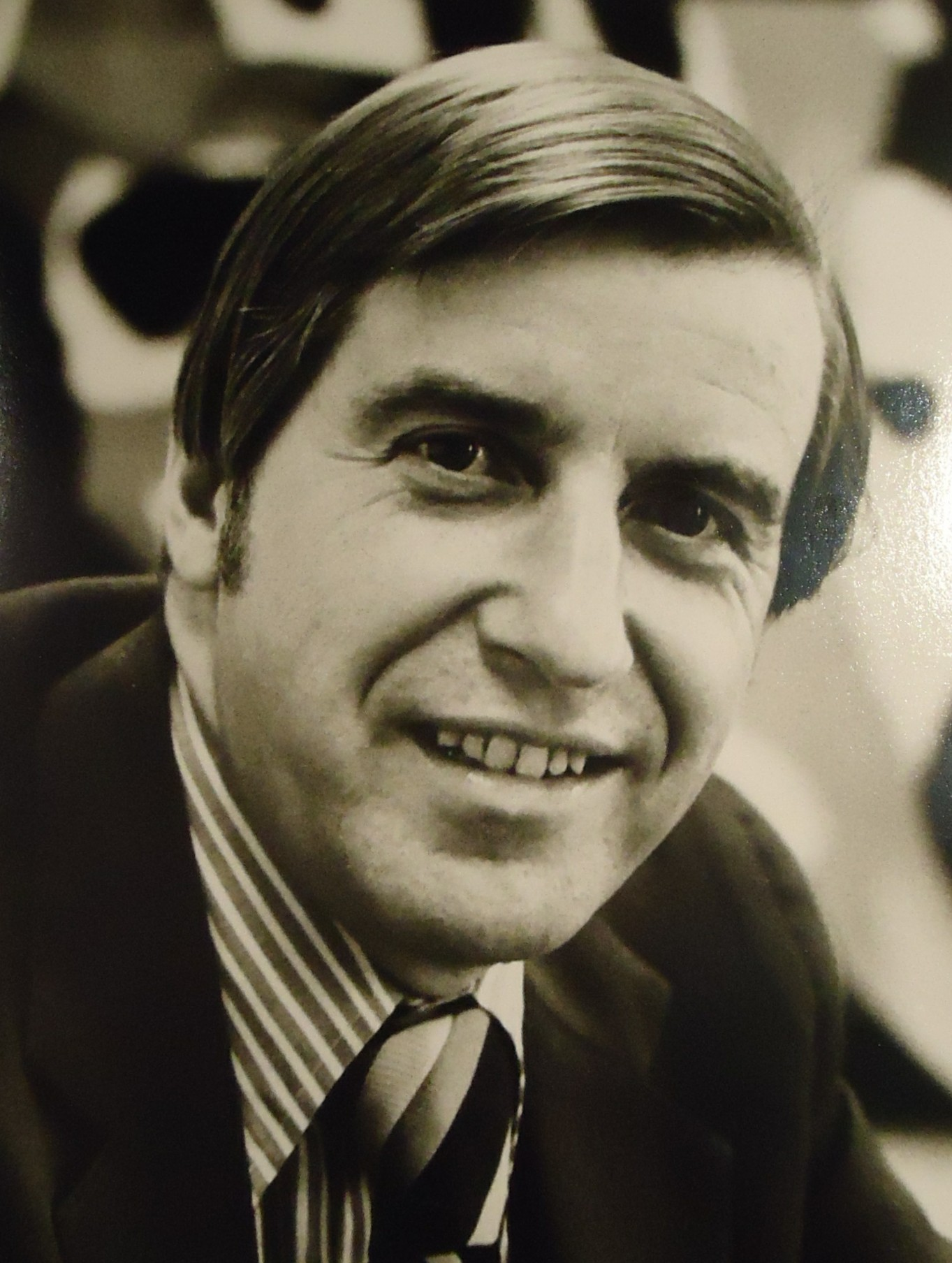
- Born: August 28, 1926; Chicago, Illinois, U.S.
- Died: January 18, 2004 (aged 77)
- Other name: Sandy Sulcer
- Education: U. Chicago, BA, 1947
- Alma mater: U. Chicago, MBA, 1963
- Occupation: Advertising
- Years active: 1953–2004
- Employer(s): DDB Worldwide, Benton & Bowles
- Known for: Put a Tiger in Your Tank
- Spouse: Dorothy Wright (artist)
- Children: Ginna Sulcer Marston
- Relatives: Quinn Marston (grandson)

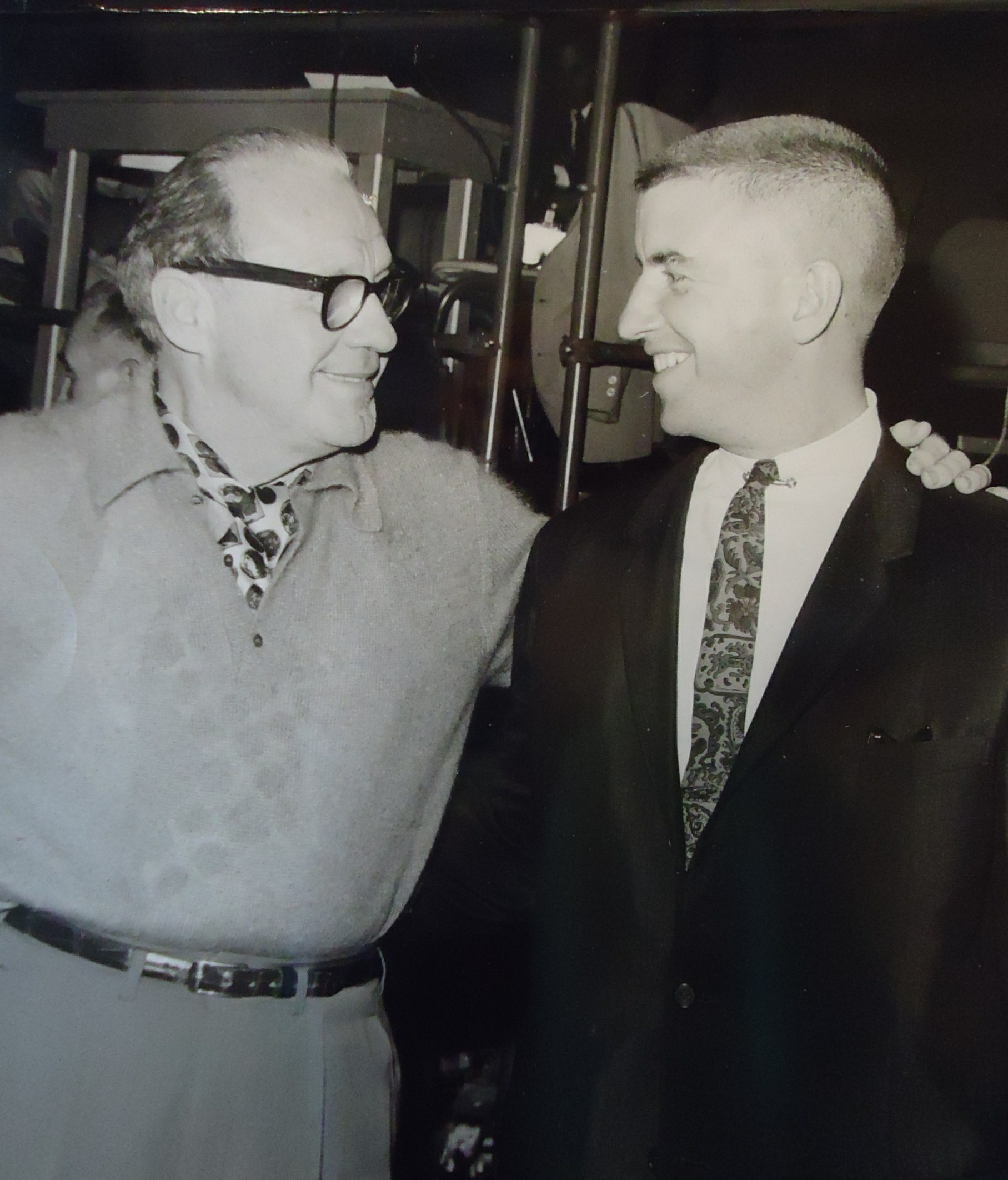
Sulcer with comedian Jack Benny in the 1950s.

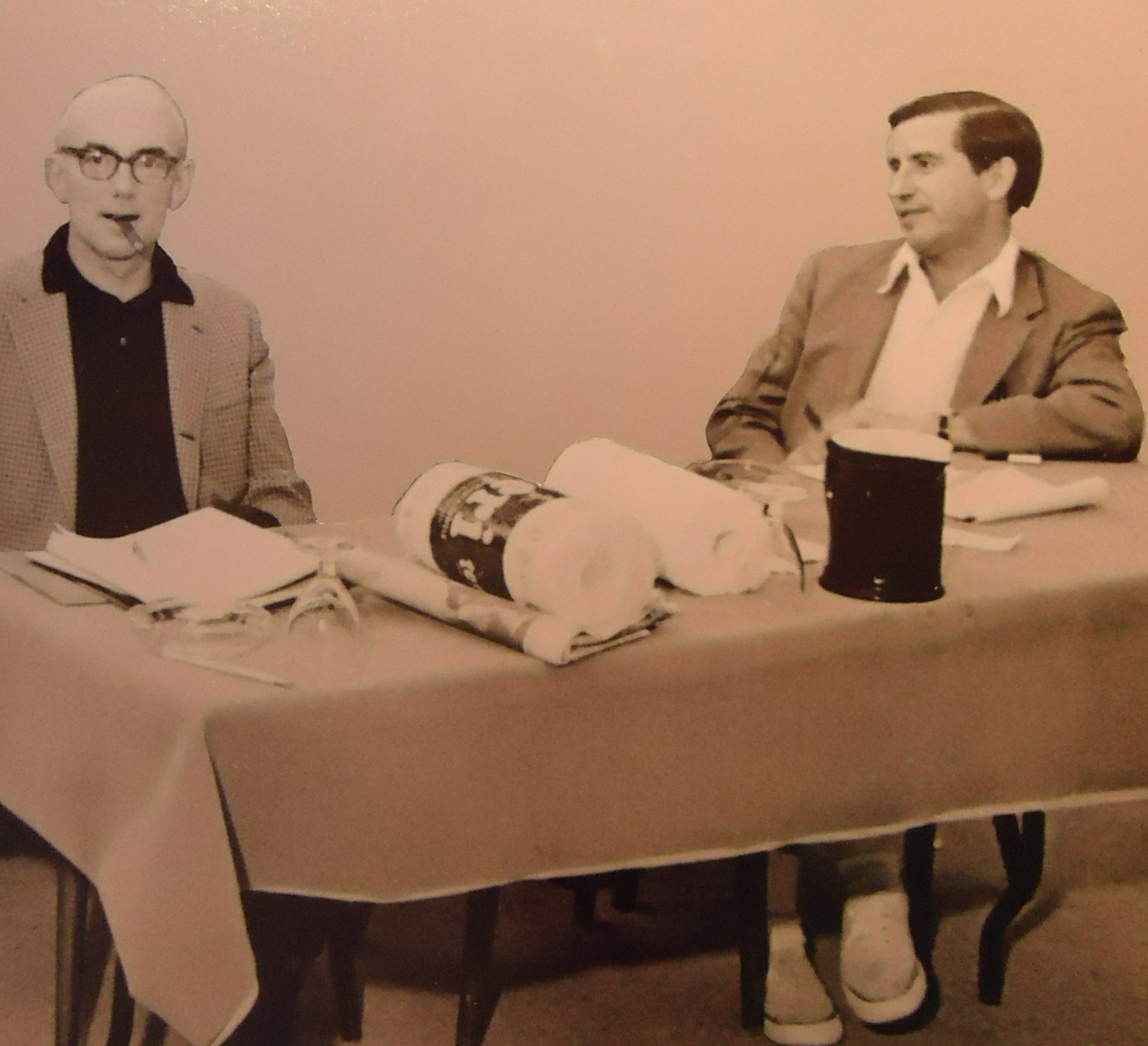
Sulcer with Needham Harper & Steers chairman Paul Harper in the 1970s.

Frederick Durham Sulcer (August 28, 1926 – January 18, 2004), known as Sandy Sulcer, was an American advertising agency copywriter and executive who created the 1960s Put a Tiger in Your Tank advertising theme for Esso gasoline, now known as ExxonMobil and later as a rainmaker bringing in new clients.

== Early years ==
Sulcer was born in Chicago in 1926 and grew up during the Great Depression. His father lost his Chicago-based advertising agency during the downturn. Sulcer had an egg delivery service and slept underneath the dining room table to allow his parents to rent out his bedroom for much–needed funds. He attended the University of Chicago on a scholarship and edited the student newspaper The Chicago Maroon and graduated in 1947. He was an amateur actor in the Quadrangle Players theater group. He was drafted and fought in the Korean War and was promoted to captain in the United States Army Corps of Engineers. After returning from Korea, he married an artist for the Chicago Tribune named Dorothy Wright. He attended night school at the University of Chicago Business School and earned an MBA degree in 1963.

== Career ==
Sulcer began his career in late 1940s at Needham Louis & Brorby in Chicago, which later became Needham Harper & Steers, as an advertising copywriter. He wrote jingles for Household Finance Corporation including Never borrow money needlessly, but when you must, trust HFC. He became a creative director. He was promoted to account executive in 1961.

To pitch Oklahoma gasoline (which became "Esso", then "Exxon", then "ExxonMobil"), he collaborated with psychologist Ernest Dichter and learned from research that drivers wanted both power and play for their automobiles. The pair, working with other agency creative people, selected the tiger as a visual symbol to express this desire. The agency borrowed a live tiger from the zoo which remained behind a large curtain while they presented the campaign idea to gasoline executives; at the end of the presentation, they opened the curtain to reveal the tiger. They won the account with the theme Put a Tiger in Your Tank.

Sulcer became assistant to the agency president Paul Harper.

Sulcer moved to Bronxville, New York in 1966 and managed the agency's New York City office. He helped persuade clients to support public service initiatives including a seat-belt public service campaign called Buckle Up for Safety as well as a traffic safety campaign entitled Watch Out for the Other Guy for the Advertising Council. Sulcer described the other guy theme and how it tried to improve awareness that other drivers were usually "nice, well-meaning people":

The other guy is not always the lane-hugging, road-burning, tire-squealing menace.

— Sandy Sulcer, 1966, in The New York Times

Sulcer helped persuade the Xerox corporation to support a TV series entitled Of Black America which was later recognized by then-president Gerald Ford as a positive effort to bring awareness to minority issues. The agency used data from a longitudinal survey of 3,000 consumers nationwide to help clients understand marketing issues as well as help interpret election results and political leanings. He held executive positions at Needham, Harper & Steers (now owned by Omnicom) including president of the New York Division, vice chairman of its international operations, and director of business development for the agency. He spoke publicly about the advertising business to professional associations. Working with chairman Paul C. Harper, Jr., he helped the agency develop a reputation as a "hot creative shop" after it won awards for advertising during the late 1960s and early 1970s. He was known for being a capable rainmaker who helped agencies pitch new business.

In 1978, he became director of new business development for DMB&B (now part of Publicis) and pitched numerous accounts. In 1990, he moved back to his previous agency, now called DDB Needham Worldwide to head up new business development, for clients such as Anheuser-Busch. He retired from the agency business in 1994.

Sulcer continued to teach and write about advertising in his later years. At Fairleigh Dickinson University, he led along with Cleve Langton and Michael Goodman the Schering-Plough executive lecture series entitled While You Were Looking The Other Way. The lecture series described annual changes in the marketing environment during the previous year which suggested cultural shifts and used marketing research to spot emerging trends. He died in 2004 at the age of 77.
