= Ginna Marston =

American advertising executive

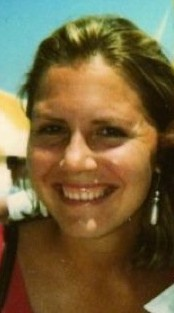
- Born: Ginna Mary Sulcer; February 19, 1958 (age 67); Chicago, Illinois, U.S.
- Education: Phillips Exeter Academy
- Alma mater: Princeton University
- Occupation: Advertising
- Employer(s): Ted Bates (1980–1986); PDFA (1986–2007)
- Spouse: Michael Marston
- Children: 2 including Quinn Marston,
- Parent(s): Sandy Sulcer, father

Ginna Sulcer-Marston (born Ginna Sulcer February 19, 1958) is an American advertising executive who has worked on anti-drug public service advertising campaigns at the Partnership for a Drug Free America, a nonprofit consortium of advertising professionals which ran targeted media campaigns to unsell illegal drugs. She was a founder of the organization in 1986. As research director, she studied the consumer motivations of drug users by means of marketing research methods. She has served as the organization's spokesperson.

== Beginnings ==
Marston is the daughter of advertising agency executive Sandy Sulcer. She graduated from Phillips Exeter Academy in 1976. She graduated with an A.B. in comparative literature from Princeton University in 1980. She worked at the Ted Bates advertising agency before joining the Partnership for a Drug-Free America in 1986 as one of the founders.

== Partnership for a Drug-Free America ==
The agency was formed during the middle 1980s by key professionals working under the auspices of the American Association of Advertising Agencies, and included Phillip Joanou, Thomas Hedrick, Doria Steedman, and Marston. Grants from the advertising association, the Robert Wood Johnson Foundation, and businesses provided funding to enable the agency to operate.

Marston identified two key perceptions involved with the decision by young kids to experiment with drugs: (1) the risk to the user and (2) possible social disapproval, and the resulting media campaigns focused on both messages. The group collaborated with anti-drug crusaders such as Carole Fields-Arnold. In the middle of the 1990s, research suggested that not only teenagers were vulnerable to drugs, but pre-teenagers as well, and Marston led an advertising effort to discourage early experimentation. She led anti-drug advertising efforts geared towards inner-city youth, and towards discouraging use of specific substances such as heroin, Ecstasy, and marijuana.

Marston advised the National Institutes of Health on anti-drug advertising strategies, and urged game designers to not glamorize drugs in video games. In 1999, she appeared in the Robert Zemeckis film entitled Smoking, Drinking and Drugging as a spokesperson.

== Personal life ==
Marston is married with two children. In addition to advertising, Marston is a singer-songwriter and has performed in local venues. Her son, Quinn Marston, is a singer-songwriter and artist.

== Publications ==
- Marston, Ginna Growing up Drug Free: A Parent's Guide to Prevention, Sally Marshall (editor), Diane Publishing Company, published April 1, 1999, ISBN 9780788178023
