= Jack Connors (businessman) =

American businessman (1942–2024)

- Born: June 9, 1942; Boston, Massachusetts, U.S.
- Died: July 23, 2024 (aged 82); Boston, Massachusetts, U.S.
- Education: Boston College
- Occupation: Businessman
- Known for: Co-founded advertising company Hill Holliday and philanthropic work in health care and Catholic schools

John Connors (June 9, 1942 – July 23, 2024) was an American businessman and philanthropist from Boston, Massachusetts.

== Early life and education ==
Connors grew up in Roslindale, Massachusetts. Connors attended Boston Latin School for one semester, St. Aidan School and Dedham High School. He attended Boston College.

== Career ==
He co-founded Hill, Holliday, Connors, Cosmopulos, Inc. in 1968, which grew to become one of the leading advertising agencies in the United States, working with prominent clients like Bank of America, Massachusetts Lottery, and Dunkin' Donuts. In 2021, he left his office in the John Hancock Tower.

=== Philanthropy ===
Beyond his business work, Connors was active in philanthropic endeavors, particularly in healthcare in Boston. As chairman of the board of trustees at Partners HealthCare (now Mass General Brigham), he played a crucial role in advancing the largest healthcare provider in Massachusetts. He also chaired the Dana-Farber/Partners CancerCare and Harvard CancerCare boards. He founded the Connors Center for Women's Health and Gender Biology at Brigham and Women's Hospital. He helped raise money for the Boston Health Care for the Homeless Program.

Connors was active in supporting education. He served as University Trustee and twice as chair of the Board of Boston College. He chaired capital campaigns for BC and regularly donated. Connors donated $10 million to establish The Connors Family Retreat and Conference Center in 2005. He supported Catholic schools. He founded and supported the Archdiocese of Boston’s Campaign for Catholic Schools, which has raised $130 million. He was instrumental in establishing Camp Harbor View, a summer camp for Boston's underserved youth, Connors collaborated with Yawkey Foundation to ensure continuation of his youth philosophical investment. He supported One Fund Boston after the Boston Marathon bombing.

== Recognition ==
His contributions have earned him various awards and honorary degrees, recognizing his impact on business and community service. In 2024 Jesuits USA East honored Connors and his wife with the Ad Majorem Dei Gloriam Award. He was awarded an honorary Doctor of Business Administration degree from Boston College in 2007. He received the Award for Inspired Leadership from the Kennedy Institute for the United States Senate.

== Personal life ==
Connors supported MA Governor Charlie Baker and he chaired his re-election campaign in 2018. He was a friend and supporter of longtime Boston Mayor Thomas Menino.

=== Death ===
Connors died after a battle with pancreatic cancer on July 23, 2024, at the age of 82. Tributes were made by Mayor of Boston Michelle Wu, Governor of Massachusetts Maura Healey, and Cardinal Seán Patrick O'Malley.
