= John Roselius =

American actor

- Born: August 19, 1944
- Died: October 29, 2018 (aged 74)
- Other name: John L. Roselius
- Occupation: Actor
- Years active: 1976–1999

John Roselius (August 19, 1944 – October 29, 2018) was an American film and television actor. He appeared in numerous films, guest starred on many TV shows, and was the principal actor in over 200 television commercials.

He starred in the famed This Is Your Brain on Drugs public service announcement in 1987. In 2016, despite this previous credit, he came out in support of legalizing marijuana.

== Filmography ==
Title	Year	Role	Notes
The Enforcer	1976	Mayor's Driver	
Goldie and the Boxer	1979	Paul Kellog	TV movie
Coast to Coast	1980	Policeman #1	
Borderline	1980	FBI Agent #1	
Love Streams	1984	Ken	
Fear City	1984	Rossi's Manager	
Courage	1984	Ralph	
Let It Ride	1989	Reardon	
State of Grace	1990	Borelli's Man	
Final Analysis	1992	Sheriff's Deputy	
Ruby	1992	Detective Smalls	
Guarding Tess	1994	Tom Bahlor	
JAG	1995–2002	Admiral Drake	6 episodes, (final appearance)
Devil in a Blue Dress	1995	Detective Mason	
Space Jam	1996	Baron's Manager	
Mars Attacks!	1996	GNN Boss	
High Incident	1996–1997	Stan Wilitz	3 episodes
Con Air	1997	Deputy Marshal Skip Devers	
Lost Highway	1997	Detective Al	
Playing God	1997	Surgeon #3	
The Truman Show	1998	Dad on Beach	
Blast from the Past	1999	Atkinson	
The Deep End of the Ocean	1999	Chief Bastokovich	
