= WeGotYou =

2015 antidrug media campaign

WeGotYou is a 2015 antidrug media campaign funded by Partnership for Drug-Free Kids. It is unusual for being communicated primarily by emoji on billboards and other public media, in an attempt to get the attention of teens and tweens. American ad agency Hill Holliday created the campaign.

== Awards ==
The campaign won two Clio Awards in 2016: gold in the health and wellness category for the integrated campaign, and bronze for the digital/mobile creation in the same category.
