= Mithun Agency =

American advertising agency

Mithun
- Type: Subsidiary of IPG
- Industry: Advertising, Marketing, Media
- Founded: 1933; 93 years ago
- Fate: Merged with Compass Point Media and McCann Worldgroup’s Minneapolis-based General Mills account team, and became McCann Minneapolis on January 27, 2016
- Headquarters: Minneapolis
- Key people: Founders: Ralph Campbell; Ray Mithun (Co-founder)
- Website: interpublic.com

Mithun was an advertising and marketing firm, founded in 1933 by Ralph Campbell and Ray Mithun. It was part of Interpublic Group of Communication Companies. The core business was consumer advertising through radio, TV, print, digital, mobile and out-of-home. The company was based in Minneapolis, Minnesota. On January 27, 2016, Mithun was consolidated alongside Compass Point Media and McCann Worldgroup’s Minneapolis-based General Mills account team into McCann Minneapolis.

== History ==
=== Early history ===
Ralph Campbell and Ray Mithun started their advertising agency as "Campbell Mithun" in the midst of the Great Depression during a time of widespread business closings and bank failures. Ralph Campbell was president for 10 years and chairman for four years before retiring in 1947. He died in 1949 at the age of 63.

Ray Mithun, earned a reputation as a visionary founder when in an internal memo he proclaimed that "Everything Talks." This statement and tenet, which remained as a staple of the agency, explains how every component of communications should work together seamlessly, like cogwheels. Mithun remained involved with the agency until his retirement in 1978 and died 20 years later.

Within the first decade of business, anchored by a client roster including Andersen Windows, Land O’Lakes and Northwestern National Bank - Ray Mithun, at the age of 34, was named president and billings had grown to $2.7 million by 1943. A 1274% increase since 1933.

=== 1950s–1960s ===
By the late 1950s and early 1960s, Campbell Mithun was highly regarded within the advertising industry for its creative work. One of the ad campaigns that propelled the company was the "Land of Sky Blue Waters" television spot for Hamm's beer. The success of this campaign led to many other accounts across the country such as Toro, Interstate Bakery and General Mills.

In 1953, Campbell Mithun became the largest advertising agency in Minneapolis.

In 1958, silent film and comedy icon, Buster Keaton created one of the first musical icons in advertising history with the Northwest Orient Airlines TV campaign.

From 1965 to 1967, Campbell Mithun worked with puppeteer Jim Henson on campaigns for La Choy canned chow mein and Wilson's Certified Meats.

In 1969, billings hit $75 million.

=== 1970s-1980s ===
In 1974, the Master Lock "Marksman" campaign became the first Super Bowl specific strategy.

In 1976, the agency started Cash Plus Media Services, a media buying service, which was renamed as Compass Point Media.

in 1977, "The Incredible, Edible Egg" campaign launched for the American Egg Board.

In 1978, Ted Bates Worldwide acquired Campbell Mithun.

In 1980, with $250 million in billings, Campbell Mithun becomes the largest agency west of the Mississippi River.

In 1985, Campbell Mithun helped client Dairy Queen conceptualize and produce the DQ Blizzard Flavored Treat.

In 1986, London-based Saatchi & Saatchi, a publicly owned company, purchases Ted Bates Worldwide, and Bates subsidiaries Campbell Mithun and William Esty. In the same year, ConAgra's Healthy Choice is added to the client roster.

In 1988, Campbell Mithun and William Esty agency merged to become Campbell Mithun Esty (CME), with combined billings of $740 million. The merger paves the way for the iconic Corona beer campaign featuring Gulf Coast beaches.

In 1989, Ray Mithun was inducted into the American Advertising Federation Hall of Fame.

=== 1990s-2000s ===
In 1992, Campbell-Mithun-Esty announced the merger of CME and London-based KHBB to form a new international advertising agency network. CME-KHBB Advertising, Inc., with combined billings of $1.2 billion, was listed as the 17th largest ad agency in the world.

In 1995, CME management and Interpublic Group of Companies entered into joint ownership of CME.

In 1996, Campbell Mithun helped develop the tagline, "Hey! Where's the cream filling?" for Hostess CupCakes, Twinkies, Ho Hos, and Ding Dongs, a tagline that will remain until 2013.

In 1998, at the age of 89, co-founder Ray Mithun died.

In 2000, Campbell Mithun parted ways with Esty and returned to its original name.

In 2001, the agency topped $1 billion in billings and aired its first Super Bowl spot for H&R Block. As part of the Interpublic Group of Companies, Campbell Mithun also had offices in California and New York and operated from its headquarter-offices in the newly named Campbell Mithun Tower in Minneapolis.

In 2006, The Lucky 13 Internship program was created to honor Ray Mithun's sentiment of courage, perspective, and opportunity. The Lucky 13 Internship program recruited talent from around the world.

On April 1, 2008, Campbell Mithun celebrated its 75th anniversary. "You Got People" won top Account Planning honors in the Service Brand category for the 2008 American Association of Advertising Agencies Jay Chiat Planning Award.

January 8, 2022. William (Bill) Dunlap, former CEO passed at age 83.

=== 2010-2016 ===
In 2010, Campbell Mithun merged with MRM Worldwide and named its first female president, Rachael Marret.

In 2013, Campbell Mithun celebrated its 80th anniversary. Rob Buchner became CEO and the agency announced plans to move to the 510 Marquette Building.

In 2014, David Carter joined Campbell Mithun as chief creative officer. Carter formerly worked at BBDO New York and created two of the One Show's Top Ten campaigns of the decade: BMW Films and HBO Voyeur.

In 2014, Campbell Mithun dropped the name Campbell, and became known as just Mithun.

In 2015, the agency lost the Land O'Lakes account to The Martin Agency after a competitive review, ending an 80-year-long relationship.

In 2016, the agency was dissolved as McCann Worldgroup consolidated Mithun, Compass Point Media and McCann Worldgroup's Minneapolis-based General Mills account team into newly formed McCann Minneapolis. CEO Rob Buchner and CCO David Carter, together with other staff members, were fired due to their inability to competitively position the agency in the digital age, win new creative business, and for losing multiple, major, historic accounts including Land O'Lakes and Toro.
