= Quinn Marston =

American musician and artist (born 1988)

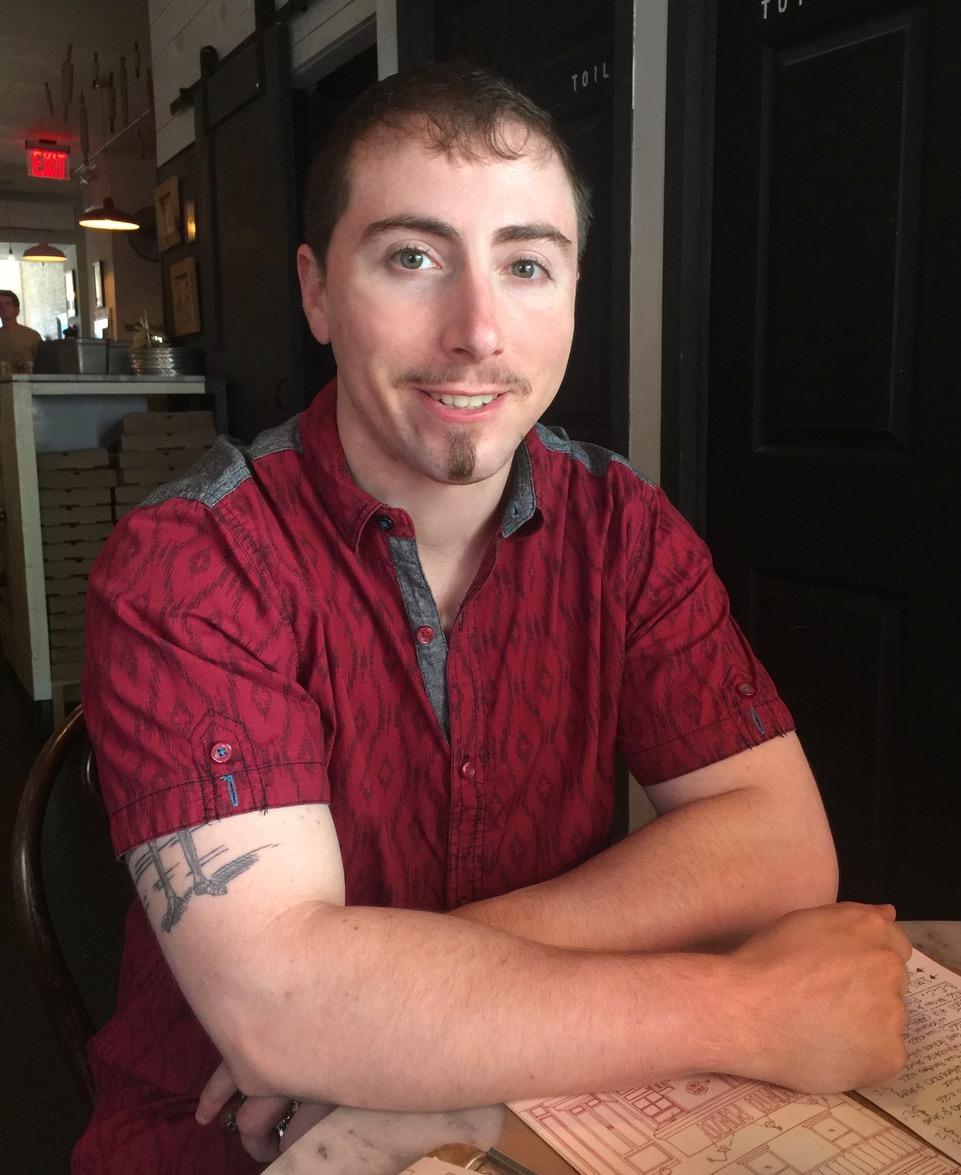
- Marston in 2019

Background information
- Born: Quinn C. Marston; May 31, 1988 (age 38); Westchester County, New York, U.S.
- Origin: New York City, U.S.
- Genres: Indie folk, indie punk, indie rock, alt soul, rootsy pop
- Years active: 2009–present
- Labels: Ernest Jenning; Producer: Tom Beaujour
- Website: qmarston.com

Quinn C. Marston (born May 31, 1988) is an American musician and artist. His music has been featured on TV shows such as One Tree Hill, Ghost Whisperer, and The Gates. He has performed regularly at various New York City clubs, including the Knitting Factory in Brooklyn and The National Underground in Manhattan. Marston is the son of public service advertising director Ginna Marston and the grandson of advertising copywriter Frederick D. Sulcer.

== Music reviews ==
Music reviewers have described Marston's music as "instantly catchy, energetic pop rock tunes," "upbeat," and "crunchy." Guitar World editor Brad Tolinski described Marston's lyrics as "unique" and that he has "something to say," which is "worth listening to." My Old Kentucky Blog wrote that his music has "ragged urgency."

His vocals have been described as "over-enunciated," "understated," and having a "shy slur to sexy shout" with an "endearing loneliness" and a "quirky confidence."

His lyrics have been described by critic Addy Danti of Buzz Danti as "witty and wise beyond their years, set to grungy melodies that encapsulate a youthful angst. Another reviewer wrote that the "title track spins and jams with ferocity that doesn't take away from Marston's melodic quality." Another described his lyrics as "sleepily whimsical poems," while another described them as "quirky and charming."

== Personal life ==
Before 2013, Marston identified as a female, and since 2013, he has identified as a male. In 2019, he identified as trans man.

== Discography ==
- Can You Hear Me See Me Now?, released October 2010, Ernest Jenning (label)
