= Ernest Dichter =

American psychologist (1907–1991)

- Born: August 14, 1907; Vienna, Austria
- Died: November 21, 1991 (aged 84); Peekskill, New York State, United States
- Education: Licenciés es lettres, Sorbonne, Paris; PhD (psychology), University of Vienna, 1934
- Occupations: Psychologist, market researcher and author
- Known for: Motivational research; focus groups
- Notable work: The Strategy of Desire (1960)
- Spouse: Hedy Langfelder
- Children: Thomas William (b. 1941); Susan Jane (b. 1943)
- Parent(s): Wilhelm Dichter; Mathilde Kurtz

Ernest Dichter (14 August 1907 in Vienna – 21 November 1991 in Peekskill, New York) was an American psychologist and marketing expert known as the "father of motivational research". Dichter pioneered the application of Freudian psychoanalytic concepts and techniques to business — in particular to the study of consumer behavior in the marketplace. His ideas significantly influenced advertising practices during the twentieth century. Dichter promised the "mobilisation and manipulation of human needs as they exist in the consumer". As the United States entered the 1950s, a decade marked by heightened commodity fetishism, Dichter offered consumers moral permission to embrace sex and consumption and forged a philosophy of corporate hedonism, which he thought would make people immune to dangerous totalitarian ideas.

== Early life and education ==
Dichter was born into a Jewish family on 14 August 1907 in Vienna. He was the eldest of three sons of Wilhelm Dichter, a small businessman, and Mathilde Kurtz. His early education was interrupted due to the family's financial difficulties. However, by working part-time as a tutor, retail-store window decorator and other odd jobs, he was able to educate himself and attended the Sorbonne in Paris where he studied literature. He received his doctorate from the University of Vienna in 1934.

After graduating, he gained some experience in market research working for the Psychoeconomic Institute in Vienna where he was part of a team that carried out research into the milk-drinking habits of the Viennese; a project where he was exposed to depth interviews for the first time. In 1934, he married Hedy Langfelder, a concert pianist and piano teacher. In 1937, while working at the institute, Dichter was arrested and interrogated for four weeks. After being released, he learned that his name had been added to a list of subversives. He realised that as a Jew with a record as a subversive, it would be virtually impossible to find work in Vienna. He and his wife fled to Paris, but soon realised that France was also a dangerous place for a Jewish family. The couple left Europe permanently, arriving in New York in 1938.

== Career ==
In 1939, soon after arriving in the US, Dichter sent out a cover letter describing himself as: "a young psychologist from Vienna ... with some interesting new ideas which can help you be more successful, effective, sell more and communicate better."

One of his first clients was the Compton Agency who invited him to work on a campaign for Ivory Soap, a Procter & Gamble product. In that project, Dichter relied on depth interviews where people talked about their experience of bathing. This method, which resembled the techniques used by cultural anthropologists, contrasted sharply with the quantitative marketing research methods in use at the time. Dichter demonstrated that bathing had an erotic element – "one of the few occasions when the Puritanical American was allowed to caress himself or herself." Dichter arrived at the insight that bathing was more than just a physical cleansing, but also a psychological cleansing. This insight gave rise to a new campaign slogan: "Be Smart and Get a Fresh Start with Ivory Soap."

He was also hired by Chrysler Corporation to help sell Plymouth cars. In that project, Dichter offered two key insights. One was that women play an important role in influencing men's purchasing decisions. His interviews also revealed the importance of the convertible. People, especially middle-aged men, connected emotionally with sports cars which reminded them of their youth and freedom. Although convertibles accounted for less than 2% of sales, they had symbolic significance in the showroom. Dichter likened the convertible to a mistress, while the sedate, comfortable sedan which most people purchased was associated with a wife. Among Dichter's recommendations to Chrysler was that the company advertise in women's magazines, a move that was highly successful.

Dichter's work on the Chrysler campaign caught the attention of the US trade press who picked up on the story of the wife or mistress. Time magazine also followed with a detailed story of Dichter and his methods. According to Time Dichter was "the first to apply to advertising the really scientific psychology." This media coverage launched Dichter's career, just eighteen months after he had arrived in the US.

Dichter also carried out the research that led to the famous slogan for Esso/Exxon. The slogan, "Put a tiger in your tank" was built around the insight that consumers associate motor vehicles with power.

In 1946, he founded the Institute for Motivational Research in Croton-on-Hudson, New York, later named Ernest Dichter and Associates and moved his home to Peekskill in New York. In the succeeding years, he founded similar institutes in Switzerland and Germany. Between the late 1930s and the 1960s, Dichter worked on hundreds of advertising campaigns, packaging ideas and product designs - from cake mixes to typewriters.

== Methods ==
Dichter borrowed techniques used in psychology; depth interviews, projective techniques and observational research methods and applied them in new ways. Rather than use these methods to treat neuroses, he used them to understand unconsciously held beliefs and attitudes that help to explain why people behave in certain ways. To do this, he gathered together small groups whose members were typical of the target audience and interviewed them to uncover their desires and predispositions to a product or brand. He called these groups focus groups. In contrast to standard market research methods of the time which sought to quantify what consumers were doing, Dichter was interested in why consumers made given purchase decisions.

An oft-cited example of Dichter's studies is an understanding of why people use cigarette lighters. The conscious explanation is that lighters are used to light cigarettes, but at a deeper, unconscious level people use lighters because it gives them mastery and power. "The capacity to summon fire inevitably gives every human being, child or grownup the sense of power. Reasons go far back into man's history... the ability to control fire is an age-old symbol of man's conquest of the physical world."

Dichter's work was central to the development of the idea of brand image. According to a 1998 article in The New York Times, he "was the first to coin the term focus group and to stress the importance of product image and persuasion in advertising". In Vance Packard's book on Dichter and his practices, Packard recalls meeting Dichter in his castle and finding children watching televisions while resident psychologists, crouching behind special screens secretly filmed and studied their every action so that they could inform advertisers how to manipulate their unconscious minds. Dichter called such focus groups his "living laboratory". One such session led to the invention of the Barbie Doll: "What they wanted was someone sexy looking, someone that they wanted to grow up to be like," Dichter reported, "Long legs, big breasts, glamorous."

Dichter's reputation fluctuated throughout his career. Vance Packard attacked the ethics of his methods in the book, The Hidden Persuaders (1956). Packard's book argued that many consumers "are being influenced and manipulated far more than we realize in the patterns of our everyday lives." Packard compared Dichter's methods to "the chilling world of George Orwell and his Big Brother." To Packard, Dichter's gothic mansion was a sinister factory that manufactured and implanted self-destructive desires. The popularity of Packard's book left the general public with a deep suspicion about market research methods. By the 1970s, Dichter and the subject of motivation research were rarely mentioned in the scholarly literature.

Dichter died on 21 November 1991 in Peekskill, New York.

== Recognition ==
Scholars have questioned whether Dichter was truly responsible for the development of motivational research or whether he was its greatest proponent. This questioning is based on the insight that the field of motivational research was already well developed prior to Dichter's arrival in the US. Without doubt, motivational research became increasingly well known within the advertising and marketing professions from the late 1940s. The Journal of Marketing featured the method in the April issue of 1950; Newsweek also featured the subject in October, 1955 and Fortune magazine devoted its cover story in June 1956 to the field. If he was not the father of motivational research, he was certainly influential in popularising the discipline. Dichter certainly positioned himself as a revolutionary in the consumer research movement of the post-war period.

He was named Man of the Year by Market Research Council in 1983.

== Publications ==
Dichter authored 17 books, numerous articles and contributed many chapters to books on advertising and market research:

Books

- The Psychology of Everyday Living (1947)
- The Strategy of Desire (1960, 1964)
- The Handbook of Consumer Motivations (1964)
- Motivating Human Behavior (1971)
- Packaging, the Sixth Sense? A Guide to Identifying Consumer Motivation (1975)
- Total Self-Knowledge (1976)
- The Naked Manager (1976)
- Getting Motivated (1979)
- How Hot a Manager Are You? (1987)
- Marketing Plus: Finding the Hidden Gold in the Market Place (1988)

Select List of Journal articles

- "Psychology in Market Research," Harvard Business Review, 25(4). 1947, pp 432–43
- "A Psychological View of Advertising Effectiveness," Journal of Marketing, 14(1), 1949, pp 61–7
- "What are the Real Reasons People Buy," Sales Management, 74(Feb), 1955, pp 36–89
- "Thinking Ahead," Harvard Business Review, 1957 (Nov–Dec), pp 19–162
- "Seven Tenants of Creative Research," Journal of Marketing, 25(4), 1961, pp 1–4
- "How Word-of-Mouth Advertising Works," Harvard Business Review, Nov/Dec, 1966, pp 147–66

== See also ==
- The Hidden Persuaders by Vance Packard (1956) contains many references to Dichter and his findings.
- Edward Bernays (Nephew of Sigmund Freud and the creator of the field of Public Relations, a marketing concept similar to motivational research in its inspiration by psychoanalytical theory)
- Sandy Sulcer
