= George Skaroulis =

- Born: George Mike Skaroulis; August 15, 1963 (age 63); Clearwater, Florida, United States
- Genres: Neo-classical, new-age, ambient, soundtrack
- Occupations: Musician, photographer
- Instruments: Piano, keyboards
- Years active: 1996–present
- Label: Evzone Music
- Website: georgeskaroulis.com

George Skaroulis (born August 15, 1963) is a Greek-American pianist, who has released 16 albums of music.

== Early life ==
Skaroulis was born in 1963 in Clearwater, Florida. His mother was a classically trained pianist and he began playing piano at the age of five. Although he experienced shyness and stage fright, he later began performing in piano stores at the local mall, accompanied by his father, and entered annual talent shows at school.

At the age of ten, his parents encouraged him to take piano lessons, but quit after five weeks, when his teacher discovered that he was playing by ear. From then on, Skaroulis taught himself piano by practising.

== Career ==
As a teenager, Skaroulis studied culinary arts, and followed his Greek grandfather into the restaurant industry, where he worked for over 20 years. Privately, he continued to play piano, composing his own songs. After moving to Atlanta, Georgia, he recorded his debut album, Homeland, in 1996, before establishing his own record label, Evzone Music.

After releasing four albums, Skaroulis left the restaurant industry to pursue music full-time. He has since released 16 albums, as well as two books of sheet music of his original compositions. His more recent releases include Sanctuary 2 on June 2, 2015, and Shine in November 2017, which includes versions of songs by Bonnie Raitt, George Perris, Billy Joel, Sam Smith, Roberta Flack, and Lara Fabian.

Skaroulis's music has also been used on several PBS documentaries, and elsewhere as backing music on TV and radio. His Christmas album, Season Traditions, was described as Best Holiday Album of 2011 by solopiano.com. In mid-2014, George's song "Fragile," was named one of the 'top 50' new age solo piano compositions by ReviewsNewAge.com

== Charity work ==
Skaroulis is the official musician of the Atlanta Humane Society, which uses his music to calm animals in their care. He has played several fundraising concerts for the organization. Skaroulis also collaborated with author Jennifer Skiff, to create the soundtrack for her book, The Divinity of Dogs, entitled The Divinity of Dogs: Music to calm dogs and the people who love them.

== Discography ==
Skaroulis's 16 CD releases include Homeland, Numinous, Season Traditions, Athena, Generations, Second Nature, Return to Homeland, Snow, Forever Young, Adagio: the music of Chris Spheeris, Sanctuary, Reunion, Imagine, and Songs for Sophie.
