= Connors Center =

Event space in Dover, Massachusetts, US

Coordinates: 42.24135°N 71.32541°W

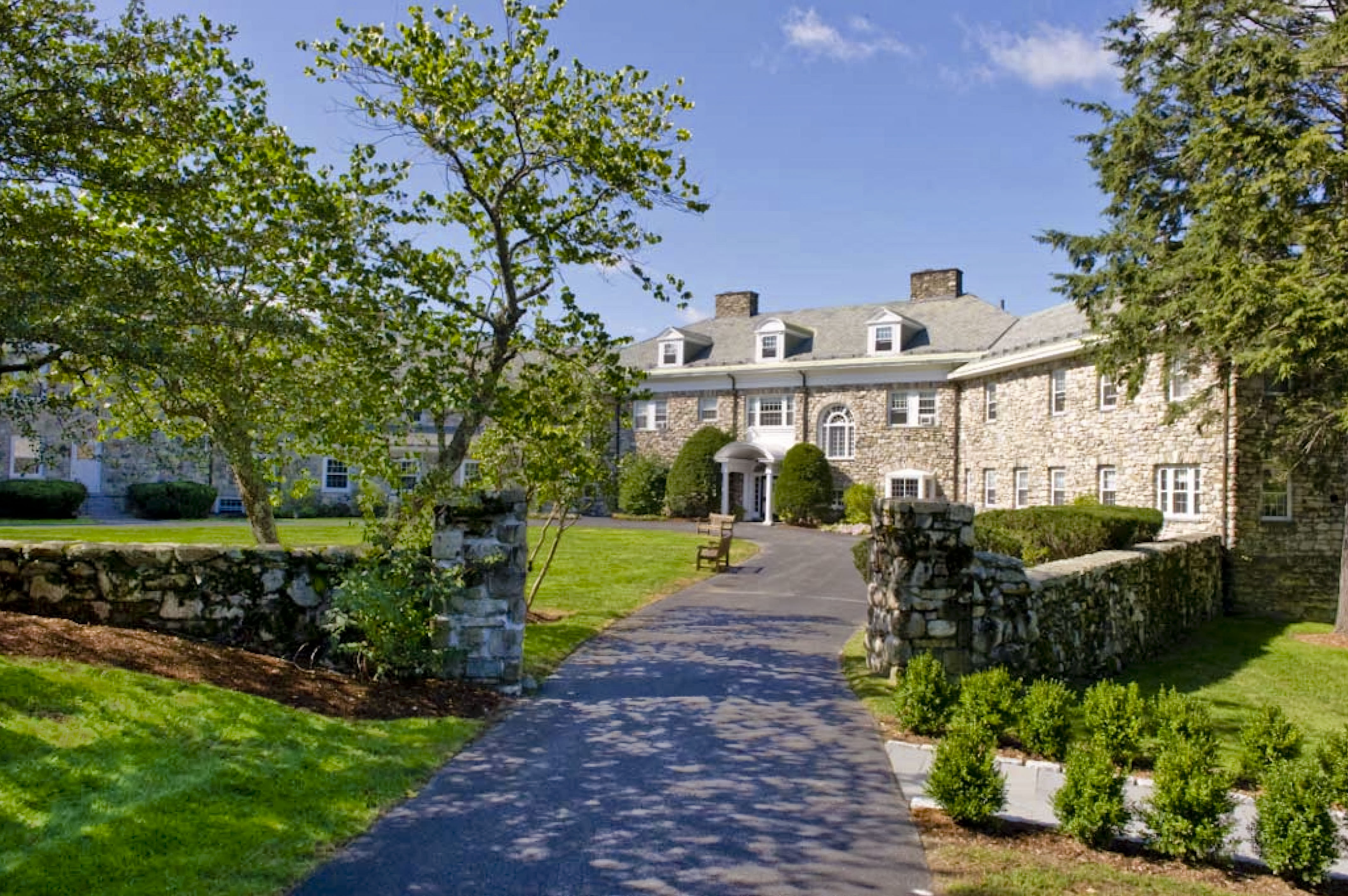
The Connors Center in September 2011

The Connors Center is an event space and former estate located in Dover, Massachusetts. It is owned and operated by Boston College.

The mansion was built in 1902 as a private home for Arthur and Mary Davis. The garden and stone landscapes were designed by Frederick Law Olmsted and Calvert Vaux. The property was purchased by the Dominican Order in 1949 and renamed to St. Stephen's Priory. The Dominican Order built a 70-room addition in 1952. Boston College acquired the property in 2004. John and Eileen Connors donated $10 million to establish The Connors Family Retreat and Conference Center in 2005.
