= Howard Helmer =

American chef

Howard Helmer (June 11, 1938 – June 30, 2025) was an American chef who is an advocate of cooking eggs. Raised in Chicago, he lived in New York City where he promoted eggs to the culinary press.

Helmer currently holds the Guinness world record for the fastest omelette cooker, having made 427 omelets in :30 minutes. This feat was accomplished in Atlanta, Georgia in 1990. He also holds the world records for fastest omelet flipper.

Helmer has appeared on the Food Network and Oprah and television programs worldwide. He was also a spokesperson for the American Egg Board and, prior to his retirement, worked with his successor to that role, Jeffrey Saad.

In 2011, Helmer was invited to do a demonstration at the White House in a "play with your food" session. Helmer died on June 30, 2025, at the age of 87, of unspecified causes.

== See also ==
- American Egg Board
