= Josh Balk =

American scholar

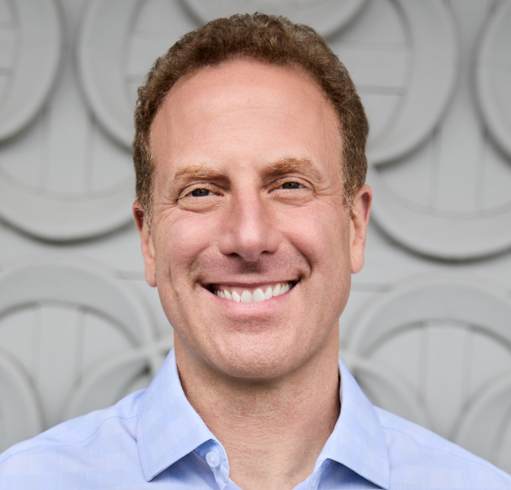
- Josh Balk in 2026
- Born: September 24, 1979 (age 46)
- Education: Associate degree, Keystone College; Bachelor's degree, George Washington University
- Occupations: CEO, The Accountability Board
- Known for: Founding Eat Just
- Awards: Valedictorian, Keystone College (2000)

Josh Balk (born September 24, 1979) is an American activist, CEO of The Accountability Board, which he co-founded. Previously, he was vice president of farm animal protection for the Humane Society of the United States (HSUS) farm animal division. In addition, he is a cofounder of Eat Just, a food technology company. Prior to working with HSUS and founding Eat Just, he was known for his work at Animal Outlook (formerly Compassion Over Killing). Balk is best known for leading successful legislative campaigns for farm animals, along with his work with food companies in enacting animal welfare policies that include eliminating gestation crates for breeding pigs and battery cages for chickens. He is also known for his work with the food industry to shift its focus onto plant-based foods.

== Baseball career ==
Balk attended Radnor High School, where he was chosen as an Adidas top 100 future Major League Baseball prospect, and also became the school's record holder for most wins and strikeouts. Since his graduation, the school honors the team's best pitcher each year with the "Josh Balk Award." He went on to Keystone College where he was awarded the school's best pitcher and all-league honors in his freshman year. However, Balk was unable to continue pitching after his first collegiate season due to a career-ending shoulder surgery. In 2001, Balk transferred to George Washington University to pursue a degree in political-science.

== Career ==
=== Work at Animal Outlook ===
Following college, Balk worked at Animal Outlook as an undercover investigator in slaughterhouses and factory farms. He also worked with various retailers, showing them different ways to add vegetarian options to their menus, and launched the organization's first national anti-factory farming advertising campaign.

=== Work at the Humane Society of the United States ===
Since starting with The HSUS in 2005, Balk waged successful campaigns persuading many of the largest corporations in the world to improve animal welfare in their supply chains. Some of these companies include Walmart, General Mills, McDonald's, Kroger, and Perdue. He has worked with food service companies like Compass Group, Aramark, and Sodexo to make plant-based front and center on their menus. He also helped lead successful legislative campaigns to criminalize factory farming abuse in Arizona, California, Colorado, Maine, Utah, Nevada, Michigan, Massachusetts, Oregon, and Washington. Most notably, Balk led the Proposition 12 campaign in California, which ushered in "historic farm animal protections."

=== Founding JUST, Inc. ===
In 2011, Balk founded Eat Just with Josh Tetrick. Bill Gates named JUST as one of three companies that will forever change the food system. The company was also named as one of CNBC's Disruptor 50 for two consecutive years in a row. In 2020, the company became the first in the world to secure a government's approval to sell cultivated meat, and soon afterward the first lab-grown meat dish, created by JUST, was sold to a customer in the restaurant 1880 in Singapore.

=== Work at The Accountability Board ===
Balk co-founded and became the CEO of The Accountability Board in 2022. The organization has an investment portfolio of roughly 100 companies including Walmart, Kroger, McDonald’s, Apple, and Exxon. TAB’s work consists of portfolio advocacy, compliance monitoring, analysis and reporting, and board assessments.

== Balk in the media ==
Balk's work has been covered by the USA Today, Associated Press, Fortune, CNN, Christian Science Monitor, The New Food Economy, Time Magazine, The Young Turks, The National Review, and dozens of other outlets. Balk has been a guest and commentator on podcasts and news programs, and he has been featured in books such as Kathy Freston's New York Times best-selling book, Veganist, Melanie Joy's Why We Love Dogs, Eat Pigs, and Wear Cows, Chase Purdy's Billion Dollar Burger, Jennifer Skiff's Rescuing Ladybugs, Leah Garcés' Grilled: Turning Adversaries into Allies to Change the Chicken Industry, Caryn Ginsberg's Animal Impact, Ben Davidow's Uncaged, Nathan Runkle's Mercy For Animals, Judah Pollack and Olivia Fox Cabane's The Net and the Butterfly, Maisie Ganzler’s You Can’t Market Manure at Lunchtime, Mike Grunwald's We Are Eating the Earth, Robert Cheeke’s The Impactful Vegan and Paul Shapiro's Clean Meat. His work with corporations was featured in Nicholas Kristoff's New York Times column entitled, "Can We See Our Hypocrisy to Animals?" printed on July 28, 2013. Balk was also a co-executive producer for the well-known 2018 documentary Game Changers.

== Awards and recognition ==
Inc. Magazine named Balk as one of the "35 Under 35", in 2014 and one of 15 entrepreneurs to watch in 2015.

Balk was also named one of "15 Entrepreneurs Who Will Make 2015 An Unforgettable Year".

At the 2015 Animal Rights National Conference, Balk was elected by fellow presenters to the Animal Rights Hall of Fame, for his innovative contributions to increasing and popularizing vegan alternatives to animal products, as well as his other work on behalf of farmed animals.
