= Michael W. Fox =

American veterinarian

- Born: Michael Wilson Fox; August 13, 1937 (age 89); Bolton
- Occupation: Veterinarian

Michael Wilson Fox (August 13, 1937) is an American veterinarian, ethologist and activist for animal rights.

== Career ==
Fox was born in Bolton and was educated at Buxton College. He obtained a Bachelor of Veterinary Medicine degree from the Royal Veterinary College in 1962, a Doctor of Philosophy in medicine in 1967 and Doctor of Science in ethology in 1976 from the University of London. He was a medical research associate at Galesburg State Research Hospital from 1964 to 1967 and an associate professor of psychology at Washington University in St. Louis from 1967 to 1976. He was vice-president of bioethics of the Humane Society of the United States from 1976 to 1998.

Fox is the author of the nationally syndicated newspaper column "Animal Doctor" and has authored more than 40 books on animal-related issues. He is an advocate of animal rights and has commented that "I am in favor of the development of appropriate technologies, industries, and food-production systems consonant with the principle of humane planetary stewardship that recognizes the right of all living things to a whole and healthy environment and the right of each living thing to equal and fair consideration." He has argued for sentientism.

Fox is a member of the American Veterinary Medical Association and Royal College of Veterinary Surgeons.

== Personal life ==
Fox lived with his wife Deanna Krantz in Minneapolis until her passing in 2023. They managed the India Project for Animals and Nature (IPAN) in Nilgiris. Fox taught at the University of Wisconsin and his books and essays on bioethics were published by the University of Wisconsin press, from 1996 to 1998.

== Selected publications ==
- Integrative Development of Brain and Behavior in the Dog (1972)
- The Dog: Its Domestication and Behavior (1978)
- The Soul of the Wolf (1980)
- The Animal Doctor's Answer Book (1984)
- Agricide: The Hidden Crisis That Affects Us All (1986)
- Returning to Eden: Animal Rights and Human Responsibility (1986)
- Inhumane Society: The American Way of Exploiting Animals (1990)
- You Can Save the Animals: 50 Things to do Right Now (1991)
- Superpigs and Wondercorn (1992)
- Understanding Your Dog (1992)
- Understanding Your Cat (1994)
- The Boundless Circle: Caring for Creatures and Creation (1996)
- Concepts in Ethology: Animal Behavior and Bioethics (1998)
