= Eat Just =

American food company

Eat Just, Inc.
- Formerly: Beyond Eggs, Hampton Creek Foods, Inc.
- Type: Private
- Industry: Food
- Founded: 2011; 15 years ago
- Founders: Josh Tetrick; Josh Balk
- Headquarters: Alameda, California, United States
- Key people: Josh Tetrick, CEO
- Website: ju.st

Eat Just Food Company is a private company headquartered in San Francisco, California, US. It develops and markets plant-based alternatives to conventionally produced egg products, as well as cultivated meat products. Eat Just was founded in 2011 by Josh Tetrick and Josh Balk. It raised about $120 million in early venture capital and became a unicorn in 2016 by surpassing a $1 billion valuation. It has been involved in several highly publicized disputes with traditional egg industry interests. In December 2020, its cultivated chicken nugget product became the first cultured meat to receive regulatory approval in the world, following its approval in Singapore. Shortly thereafter, Eat Just's cultured meat was sold to diners at the Singapore restaurant 1880, making it the "world's first commercial sale of cell-cultured meat".

== History ==
=== 2011–2014 ===
Eat Just Inc. was founded in 2011 under the name Beyond Eggs and then Hampton Creek Foods by childhood friends Josh Balk and Josh Tetrick. It started in Los Angeles, California, then moved to Tetrick's garage in San Francisco in 2012. At the time, the company had about 30 employees. Initially, it had $500,000 then $2 million in venture capital funding from Khosla Ventures.

Hampton Creek's first two years were spent in research and development. It tested plant varieties in a lab in order to identify plant proteins with properties similar to chicken eggs, such as gelling and emulsifying. Eat Just created an automated process for testing plants that was patented in 2016. Information like each plant's drought tolerance, taste, and any likely allergenic problems were compiled into a database called Orchard.

In September 2013, Whole Foods became the first major grocery chain to sell Hampton Creek products, when it started using Just Mayo in certain prepared foods. This was followed by deals with Costco and Safeway. By early 2014, the company had raised $30 million in venture capital funding. Later that year, it raised another $90 million.

The American Egg Board responded to the growth of Hampton Creek and other egg substitute companies with an advertising campaign featuring the slogan "Accept No Substitutes."

=== 2014–2016 ===
In October 2014, competitor Unilever sued Hampton Creek Foods alleging the "Just Mayo" name misled consumers into believing the product contained real eggs. Public sentiment favored Hampton Creek and more than 100,000 people eventually signed a Change.org petition asking Unilever to "stop bullying sustainable food companies." Unilever withdrew its lawsuit six weeks after filing it. However, the Food and Drug Administration sent a warning letter saying the Just Mayo name was misleading to consumers, since the product must contain real eggs to be called "mayonnaise." In December 2015, Hampton Creek reached an agreement with the FDA to make it more clear in the Just Mayo packaging that it does not contain real eggs. Publicity from the lawsuit and an egg shortage from the bird flu helped Hampton Creek grow.

In late 2015, several former employees anonymously alleged Hampton Creek was exaggerating the science behind its products, mislabeling the ingredients in pre-production samples, and manipulated employment contracts. Then, emails secured through the Freedom of Information Act showed that the American Egg Board hired Edelman Public Relations to engage in a campaign targeting Hampton Creek's reputation. Among other things, the emails inferred the Egg Board discussed interfering with Hampton's contract with Whole Foods, encouraged Unilever in their legal actions against Hampton Creek, and made jokes about hiring a hitman to kill the Hampton Creek CEO. The United States Department of Agriculture opened an investigation and the CEO of the Egg Board resigned.

Then, in 2016, a Bloomberg story reported on evidence inferring that Hampton Creek bought its own products off of store shelves in order to inflate sales numbers during fund-raising. Hampton Creek said this was part of an unorthodox quality control program. The Securities and Exchange Commission and the Department of Justice started an inquiry that was closed in March 2017 after concluding the allegations were insignificant.

=== 2016–present ===
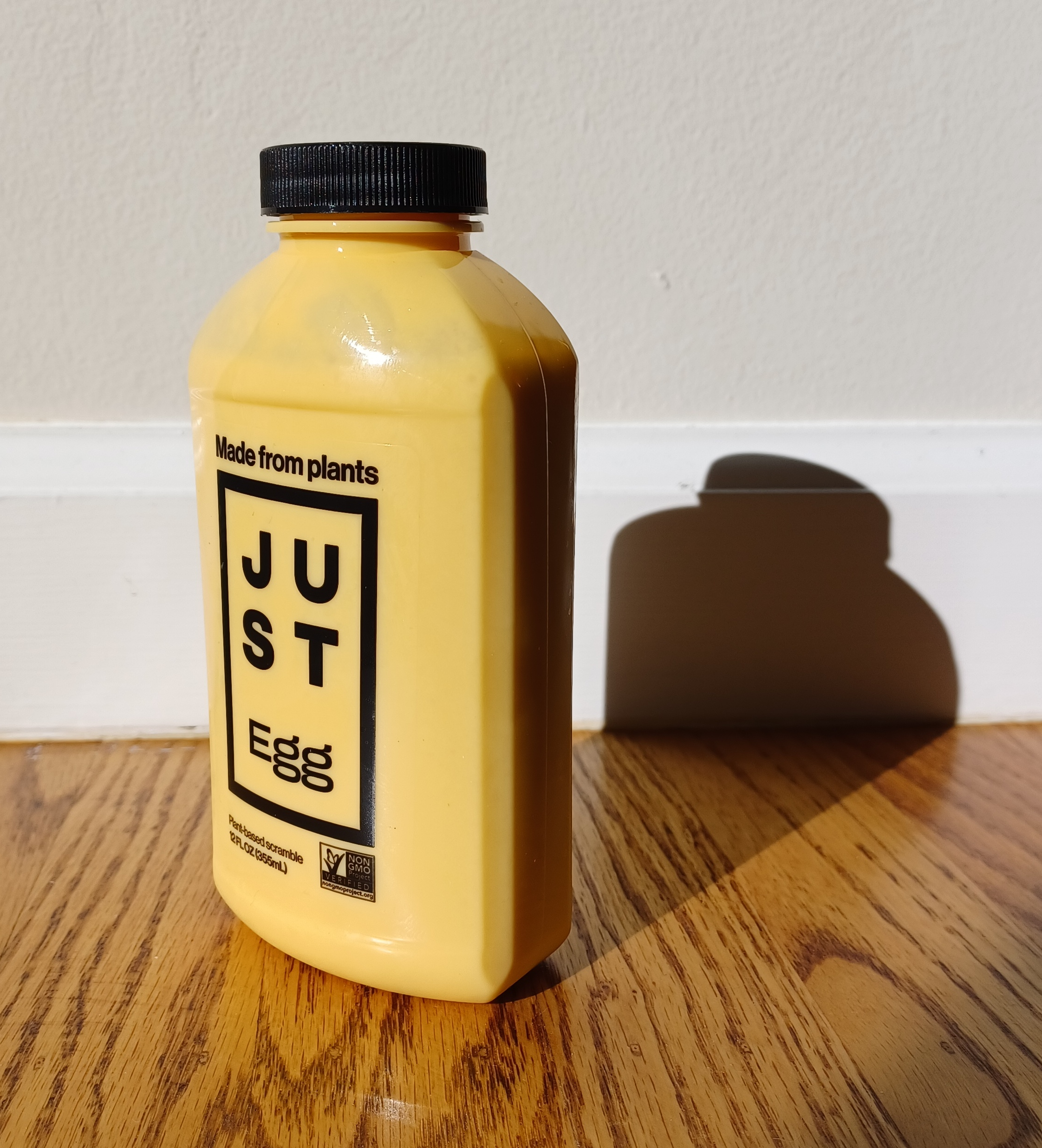
Just Egg

By 2016, Eat Just had 142 employees. Late that year, it also substantially expanded its laboratory testing of prospective plant proteins, using robots and automation. In August 2016, Hampton Creek raised another round of funding from investors. The funding made the company a unicorn with a valuation of over $1 billion, but the amount of the funding was not disclosed.

In June 2017, Target stopped selling Hampton Creek products after seeing an anonymous letter alleging food safety issues, such as Salmonella and Listeria at Eat Just's manufacturing facility. Target said none of its customers reported getting sick and an FDA investigation found no contaminants in Hampton Creek's products.

Several of Hampton Creek's executives were fired in 2017, after the company alleged they were trying to take away CEO Josh Tetrick's control of the company. By July 2017, the entire board had been fired, resigned, or moved to an advisory role except for the CEO and founder Josh Tetrick, reportedly over disputes with the CEO. Five new board members were appointed.

Hampton Creek started transitioning its website and other branding to focus on the "Just" name in June 2017. The company's legal name was changed the following year. This prompted trademark litigation with a bottled water company run by Jaden Smith that also uses the "Just" brand.

In late 2019, Eat Just Inc. acquired its first manufacturing plant. The 30,000 square foot plant in Appleton, Minnesota, was originally a Del Dee Foods plant. Eat Just sales increased by more than 100% from February to July 2020, due to the COVID-19 pandemic.

In 2020, Eat Just created an Asian subsidiary with Proterra Investment Partners Asia. Through the joint venture, Proterra promised to invest up to $100 million and, with Eat Just, started building a manufacturing facility for manufacturing of plant protein in Singapore.

Eat Just raised $200 million in funding in March 2021 to fund global expansion. Also in 2021, Eat Just's GOOD Meat subsidiary raised $267 million in venture capital funding.

In May, 2022, Eat Just signed a contract with ABEC Inc., which manufactures bioprocess equipment, to build 10 bioreactors for growing meat. Tetrick estimates that the new bioreactors could potentially produce 30 million pounds of cultured meat per year. The location for the bioreactors is pending regulatory approval by the Food and Drug Administration and U.S. Department of Agriculture. In 2023, ABEC filed a lawsuit again Eat Just for breach of contract. The lawsuit alleges that Eat Just has failed to live up to its financial obligations and has failed to pay over $30 million worth of invoices.

In June 2022, it was announced that Eat Just was building a 30,000 square-foot facility to product cultured meat in Singapore, which was slated to open in early 2023. However, in March 2024, it was reported that the facility had been shuttered.

Eat Just partnered with C2 Capital Partners in 2022, receiving $25 million from the private equity firm to expand Eat Just's operations in China.

In April 2023, Barnes & Noble launched breakfast sandwich made with Just Egg in 500 B&N Cafés nationwide.

== Lawsuits ==
Eat Just has been the subject of a number of lawsuits, primarily over unpaid bills. In 2023, bioreactor specialist ABEC sued Eat Just in a lawsuit claiming breach of contract due to Eat Just not paying over $61 million worth of invoices. That suit was settled on March 11, 2025 with a confidential agreement having each party pay their own legal costs, Eat Just giving up just under $4.4 million, and with Judge Wendy Beetlestone finding for ABEC in some matters and against it in others. Insiders said to Wired in 2023 that the company had a culture of paying suppliers late or withholding payment entirely. In 2021, the company was sued by the landlord of its San Francisco headquarters, 2000 Folsom Partners LLC, over $2.6 million in overdue rent payments. Eat Just was also sued in 2021 by the Archer-Daniels-Midland Company over failing to pay a $15,000 2015 bill for hemp seeds, and by VWR International for $189,000 in unpaid debt.

== Food products ==
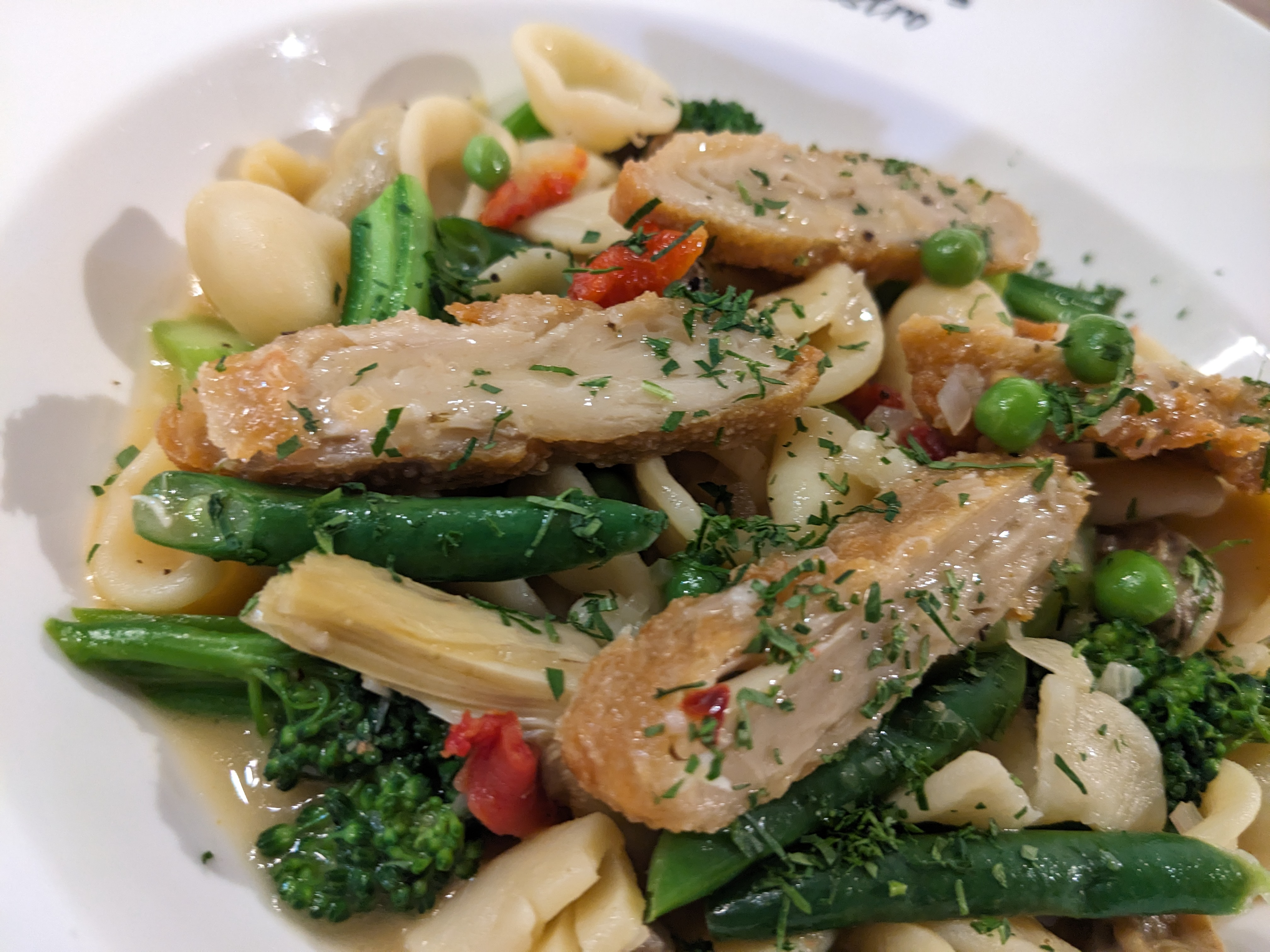
Pasta dish with Good Meat's cultivated chicken meat in Singapore

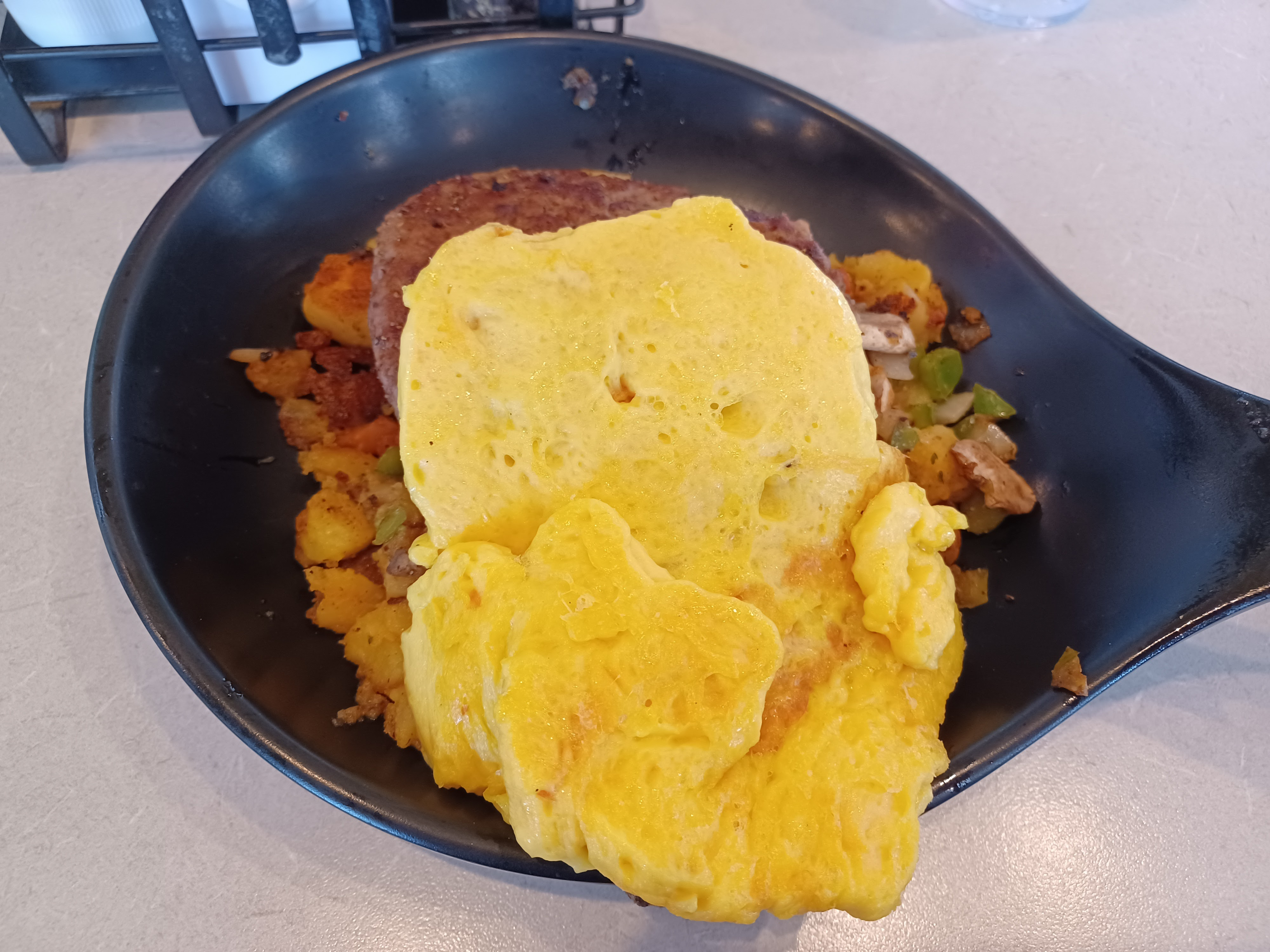
Just Egg with a vegan meat replacement and potatoes, served at a diner in Celebration, Florida

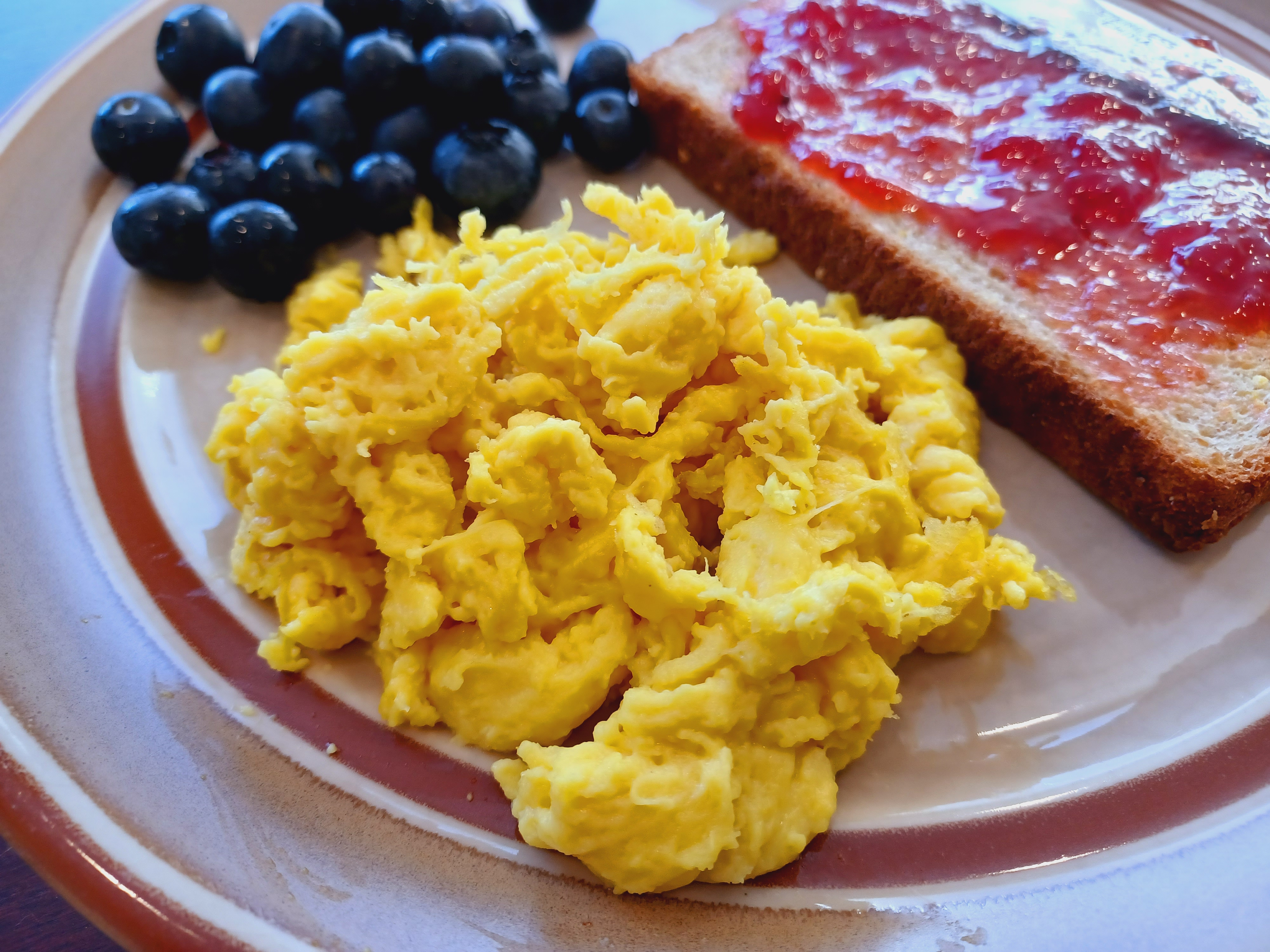
Just Egg cooked like scrambled eggs

=== Egg alternatives ===
Eat Just develops and markets plant-based substitutes for foods that ordinarily use chicken eggs, such as scrambled eggs and mayonnaise. The company is best known for its plant-based Just Egg made from mung beans. According to Eat Just, the company has made the equivalent of 100 million eggs worth of food products as of March 2021.

The company's egg substitutes are developed by finding plant proteins that serve a function eggs are normally used for, such as binding or emulsifying. For example, plant proteins are analyzed for molecular weight, amino acid sequences, and performance under heat or pressure. Much of the testing is focused on finding high-protein plants with specific types of proteins.

Eat Just's first product, Beyond Eggs, was intended to replace eggs in baked goods and was released in February 2013. It is made with peas and other ingredients. Later on, Eat Just developed plant-based substitutes for mayonnaise and cookie dough. Initially, the company focused on foods that use eggs as an ingredient, like muffins. In July 2017, it started selling a substitute for scrambled eggs called Just Egg that is made from mung beans. It released a frozen version in January 2020.

=== Meat alternatives ===
In 2025, Eat Just started selling plant-based meat alternatives, under the "Just Meat" brand. Three flavors of plant-based chicken (with different seasonings) are available.

=== Cultured meat ===
In late 2017, Eat Just announced it was developing a cultivated meat product to make chicken nuggets. The meat is grown in a bioreactor in a fluid of amino acids, sugar, and salt. The chicken nuggets are 70% cultivated meat, while the remainder is made from mung bean proteins and other ingredients. The company is also working on cultivated Japanese Wagyu beef. Cultured, also known as cultivated or cell-based meat, cannot be sold commercially until it is allowed by government regulators.

In December 2020, the Government of Singapore approved cultivated meat created by Eat Just, branded as GOOD Meat. A restaurant in Singapore called 1880 became the first place to sell Eat Just's cultured meat. In 2024, Eat Just began selling a product combining cultured meat (3%) with a plant-based meat alternative (97%) in a retail store in Singapore.

Eat Just subsequently got additional approvals for different types of chicken products, such as shredded and breast chicken. In 2023, the company received approval from the United States Department of Agriculture and Food and Drug Administration to sell its cultured meat in the United States.
