= Rainmaker (business) =

Person who brings in new business

In business, a rainmaker is a person who brings in new business and wins new accounts almost by magic, since it is often not readily apparent how this new business activity is caused. It means generating substantial new business or additional cash flow from sources sometimes outside established business channels, sometimes by connecting with people in non-traditional or hidden markets, and sometimes by prompting current clients to spend more money. A rainmaker is usually a key figure in the business or organization, not merely a salesperson, but a principal or executive who is usually highly regarded within the enterprise.

The origin of the business sense of rainmaker may be an allusion to the Native American practice of dancing to encourage deities to bring forth the rain necessary for crops. In summertime during a drought, for instance, the rainmaker would dance and sing songs on the plains, and the activity was believed by others in the tribe to magically cause clouds to come and bring the life-giving rain. By analogy, a business rainmaker would magically bring new business and clients to a firm or generate more revenue from existing customers and donors, and rain is a metaphor for money.

The term rainmaking is also applied to political fund-raising.
