= American Egg Board =

United States marketing board

Agency overview
- Formed: December 22, 1975
- Headquarters: Chicago, IL
- Agency executives: Emily Metz, CEO and President; Alex Simpson, Chairman
- Key documents: 7 U.S.C. ch. 60; 7 CFR 1250
- Website: www.incredibleegg.org

The American Egg Board (AEB) is a United States checkoff marketing organization, which focuses on marketing and promotion of eggs for human consumption. The AEB is best known for its long-running slogan, "The Incredible, Edible Egg", and the Just Mayo scandal.

== Organization ==
The American Egg Board (AEB) is a checkoff organization, meaning that it is funded by a levy against its members for each unit they produce; in this case, an amount per case of eggs shipped. Through the AEB, U.S. egg producers come together, in accordance with statutory authority, to establish, finance and execute coordinated programs on research, education and promotion—all geared to drive demand for eggs and egg products. The Board consists of 18 members and 18 alternates from all regions of the country, nominated by the egg industry, and appointed by the U.S. Secretary of Agriculture. AEB and all program activities are funded by U.S. egg producers, subject to USDA approval. AEB is located in Chicago, Ill.

== History ==
American egg farmers approved the creation of the AEB in a 1975 referendum. It was created by the Egg Research and Promotion Order pursuant to the Egg Research and Consumer Information Act of 1974. A referendum was conducted November 3–28, 1975, by the Agricultural Marketing Service and seventy-three percent of eligible producers approved the program. AEB was established by the order and became the American Egg Board, beginning July 9, 1976.

In 1977, American egg farmers also began work on an advertising campaign to increase demand for eggs – its first television commercial began airing in 1977, touting the nutritional benefits as The Incredible, Edible Egg first featuring actor Lawrence Pressman then James Hampton. The marketing slogan was created in 1974 by the advertising agency Campbell Mithun. In 1993, the AEB launched a new advertising campaign called "I Love Eggs", in which the campaign ran from 1993 to 1997. In 1998, the AEB launched another advertising campaign called "If it ain't eggs, it ain't breakfast, I love eggs".

The AEB also promotes the many facets of egg products and the unique functionalities they contribute to many packaged food products. The term ‘egg products’ refers to processed and convenience forms of eggs for foodservice and food manufacturers. These products can be classified as refrigerated liquid, frozen, dried, and pre-cooked products. Additionally, the AEB also works with foodservice professionals to keep eggs on top of evolving food trends, emerging consumer needs and changing competitive landscapes.

== Suppression of free marketplace ==
In 2008, the AEB tried to funnel $3 million to a private lobbying organization, attempting to overturn a California ballot measure which would prohibit the extreme confinement of farm animals. This unlawful coordination with an advocacy group was stopped by an injunction issued by a federal court.

Anti-competitive marketing tactics have also been displayed by the AEB in their involvement to get government retailers and regulators to participate in the halting of sales for Just Mayo brand products. The USDA found emails by the AEB threatening to put a “hit” on CEO Josh Tetrick of Hampton Creek, the company that produces Just Mayo brand products.

=== Hampton Creek campaign ===
In September 2015, the AEB was investigated regarding their actions of paid advocacy against Hampton Creek, a company marketing vegan egg substitutes and Just Mayo, a mayonnaise substitute which uses pea protein as an emulsifier in place of eggs.

In September 2015, a Freedom of Information request by Ryan Shapiro had revealed a number of cases where the government-controlled AEB had engaged in a systematic paid advocacy campaign targeting Hampton Creek. The AEB paid food bloggers to post articles containing the group's talking points regarding eggs, targeted personalities and websites that had posted articles covering the company in a positive manner, and purchased keyword advertising on Google Search to display advertisements on searches for Hampton Creek or its founder Josh Tetrick, among other actions. AEB chief executive Joanne Ivy stated at one point that Hampton Creek was a "crisis and major threat to the future." She suggested, in remarks that were later claimed to be jokes, to have a murder-for-hire plot initiated against Tetrick. These actions violate USDA policies, which disallow advertising by its marketing boards that are "deemed disparaging to another commodity." The USDA stated in a report that AEB staff “will be required to complete additional training regarding proper email etiquette and ethics.”

As a result of the Hampton Creek scandal, Joanne Ivy, the chief executive of the board, took early retirement.

== Egg Nutrition Center ==
American egg farmers also established the Egg Nutrition Center (ENC), which serves as a source of nutrition and health science information, and conducts in scientific health research and education related to eggs. ENC also monitors scientific findings and regulatory developments, and serves as a resource for health practitioners.

== Charitable Commitment ==
American egg farmers have donated millions of eggs to America's food banks and pantries in addition to their ongoing disaster relief work in response to tragedies like the 2010 Haiti earthquake and the 2011 Joplin tornado. Additionally, they provide millions of dollars in free educational materials to American schools to help promote agricultural education and agricultural literacy.

=== White House Easter Egg Roll ===
Since 1977, AEB also has supported the annual White House Easter Egg Roll, the largest public event on the south lawn of the White House. America's egg farmers donate approximately 30,000 eggs to be rolled, hunted, decorated, and snacked on each year. The Incredible Egg also has a presence on the South Lawn, through “Farm to Table: An Egg’s Journey,” a hands-on exhibit that shows how eggs get from the hen house to the home. A giant inflatable Incredible Balloon and mascot can also be found on the lawn throughout the day and EggPops are handed out as a snack to hungry attendees. This annual event also includes the presentation of a commemorative egg to the First Lady. The Commemorative Eggs are created by artists from across the nation. The eggs become the property of the first family and typically end up on display in the presidential library.

In 2024 President Joe Biden was denounced from the right for banning Christian symbols from the White House Easter events. The AEB and the White House pointed out that the guidelines for an AEB sponsored children's egg design contest that prohibited discrimination and religious symbols had been in place for over 45 years.

== See also ==
- Howard Helmer
- United Egg Producers
- Agricultural Marketing Service
