= I learned it by watching you! =

Anti-drug campaign

Like Father, Like Son, also known as I learned it by watching you!, was a large-scale United States anti-narcotics campaign by Partnership for a Drug-Free America. Launched in July 1987, the campaign used a televised public service announcement.

The PSA features a father (Roland Caccavo) confronting his son (Reid MacLean) in his bedroom after finding a box containing an unspecified controlled substance and drug paraphernalia. After his father angrily asks him how he learned to use drugs, the son shouts, "You, alright? I learned it by watching you!" As the father responds with a look of regret, a narrator then says, "Parents who use drugs have children who use drugs."

It was listed by Time as one of the top ten PSAs of all time.

== See also ==
- War on drugs
- Partnership for A Drug-Free America
