= Partnership to End Addiction =

American non-profit organization

- Formation: 1985; 41 years ago
- Founded: 1985; 41 years ago (as Partnership for a Drug-Free America)
- Founder: Phillip Joanou
- Type: National Non-Profit
- Tax ID no.: 13-3413627
- Purpose: Providing comprehensive support to families coping with a loved one who is experiencing a substance‑use disorder.
- Headquarters: 711 Third Avenue 5th Floor, Suite 500
- Location: New York City, New York, U.S.
- Region served: United States
- Method: Family Support, Substance Use and Addiction Prevention, Treatment, and Recovery
- Chief Executive Officer: Creighton Drury
- Employees: 100
- Website: https://drugfree.org/
- Formerly called: Partnership for a Drug-Free America (1985–2010); Partnership at DrugFree.org (2010–2014); Partnership for Drug-Free Kids (2014–2020)

Partnership to End Addiction, formerly called The Partnership for a Drug Free America, is a non-profit organization aiming to prevent the misuse of illegal drugs. The organization is most widely known for its TV ad This Is Your Brain on Drugs.

Early public service announcements created by the organization have been called iconic, and during their initial release were part of the largest privately run public-service campaign in history. The organization's marketing experience was written up as a 58-page marketing "case study" for study by students at the Harvard Business School. An analysis of the Partnership's efforts by Forbes magazine suggested that it had earned "a single-brand advertising clout" during the Reagan era comparable to that of McDonald's.

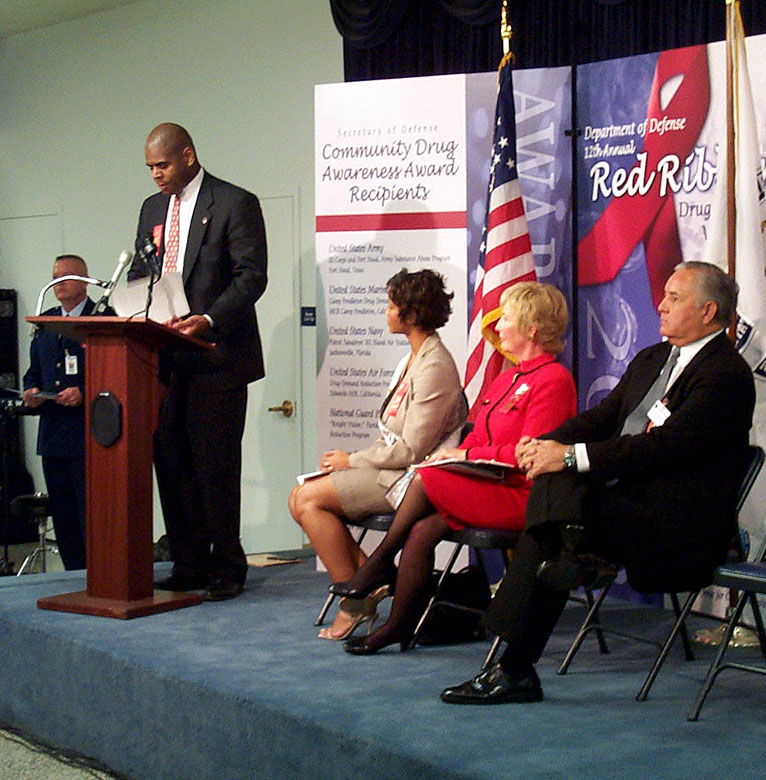
The Partnership coordinates efforts with government officials, including Andre Hollis, the deputy assistant defense secretary for counternarcotics, in 2002.

== History ==
=== Founding ===
In the mid-1980s, a small group of advertising professionals working with the American Association of Advertising Agencies proposed a marketing campaign to reduce teenage drug use. The group was formed officially in 1985. The group saw the merits of focused approach similar to that for a commercial product or service. Public service announcements or PSAs had previously been shown by networks whenever possible, regardless of intended audience. Many PSAs aired late at night, or were used by networks to fill slots lacking other advertisements. Marston urged, instead, a targeted focused anti-drug campaign similar to that for a specific brand of cereal or an automobile, but instead "unselling" drugs or rather selling the benefits of not using drugs.

An anti cocaine advertisement the PDFA released in 1987.

Hedrick said that the group knew "next to nothing about illegal drugs and the youthful target audience for their ads". The organization was loosely modeled along the lines of a standard advertising agency, with a creative director post and "account executives" to head specific effort. Further, the agency did continual reassessments of public perception.

Take the decision to buy and use heroin (or pot, or coke or any illegal drug) and treat it like any other purchasing choice. Liken potential addicts to a group of consumers whose buying habits can be manipulated by celebrity endorsements, catchy slogans, and powerful images. Then use those tricks not to sell the product, but to un-sell it. If the approach works, drugs will finally lose their cool.

— Pamela Warrick in the Los Angeles Times

The agency solicited help from copywriters, media planning and placement experts often competed to submit advertising assignments without charge. The agency gained free exposure from print media and broadcast networks, including spots during prime time. The group "deliberately designed [advertisements] to disturb and upset." Executives from The New York Times Company and Procter & Gamble sat on the Partnership's board of directors. An early grant of $300,000 from the American Association of Advertising Agencies contributed towards rent and other expenses. Later funds were provided by grants from the Robert Wood Johnson Foundation, whose founder, Robert Wood Johnson II, left the foundation shares of stock upon his death in 1968. By 1993, it had 30 employees.

=== This Is Your Brain on Drugs ===
The organization first became more widely known in 1987, with its This Is Your Brain on Drugs broadcast and print public service advertisements (PSAs). This said that if a person's brain is an egg, then using illegal drugs would be like frying it. It was shown repeatedly on broadcast media. Time magazine called it "iconic". It has been recognized as "one of the most influential" ad campaigns in the history of marketing, or one of the "most unforgettable images in modern American advertising". TV Guide put it among the "top 100 ads of all time". It became the organization's "calling card."

The ad had varying impacts on viewers. One student felt the "brain on drugs" commercial was not accurate, since she saw fellow students smoking marijuana but with brains that were clearly not frying. She claimed that the ad "stirred her curiosity" and called the ad more of a "dare" tactic. Another student said "the fried egg commercial really scared me when I was in high school. I remember picturing that egg in the frying pan and thinking that it wasn't worth it."

Following This Is Your Brain on Drugs, the agency was able to solicit donations of free advertising time with an estimated worth of "$1 million worth of advertising every day" for more than a decade, totaling more than $2 billion in free space and time.

The "frying pan" ad was described as a "relic" in one report, although New York Sun reporter Amanda Gordon noted that the organization gives gold-plated frying pan awards (mounted under glass) at fundraisers.

=== The 1990s ===
In 1989, Johnson & Johnson chief executive James E. Burke took over leadership of the organization. In 1992, the Partnership switched focus to targeting inner-city youth, where the drug problem had been more severe, and ran a campaign led by Ginna Marston. Research suggested most children felt "nearly alone in their hostility toward drugs." In one television commercial, a camera zooms in and out on two adolescents, one of whom is trying to get the other to try marijuana. The tagline then reads: "A friend who offers you drugs is not your friend." It was a "strikingly different tack" from the milder Just Say No campaign championed by previous first lady Nancy Reagan. The ads were often "infused with menace and melodrama." Some spots by a Goodby, Berlin & Silverstein copy team hinted that the earlier Just Say No had been simplistic. Marston explained the utility of depicting young people "resisting drugs in real situations":

The new campaign addresses kids' feelings and their sense of emotional isolation on this issue. ... The problem is not drugs, but an attitude of hopelessness ... They start to feel they don't count, they don't matter. They feel bad about themselves and give up on themselves; those are the ones who get into drugs ... It's not to kill time, as happens in the general market ... but to kill pain.

— Ginna Marston, 1992, PDFA campaign director.

The organization used real stories about the effects of drug use. A 28-year-old former drug user met for lunch with the Partnership's Doria Steedman, and at one point "pulled out her [false] teeth" to show the ravages of the drug use; this idea was used in a subsequent commercial.

In 1994, an independent assessment from the Johns Hopkins School of Medicine suggested that the anti-drug campaign was having a measurable "deterrence effect" on American adolescents:

No one presumes advertising is going to stop all drug abuse in America ... Using the idea that attitudes change behavior and using the best ad minds to denormalize drug use, they have sent a very strong message over the years, and their work is a very important component in the national effort to reduce drug use."

— Chris Policano, spokesman for Phoenix House, in 1994

In 1996, research efforts suggested a link between getting preteens and teenagers to wait longer before using drugs for the first time, and the decreasing likelihood of becoming a regular drug user. A new campaign was announced, aimed at "getting parents involved in the war against drugs.

Marston and other executives adjusted their media strategy accordingly as fast-moving trends made one drug "hot" while others fell out of favor. The campaign was primarily oriented towards television and print media.

The Partnership coordinated efforts with Barry McCaffrey, the director of the Office of National Drug Control Policy, in targeting efforts against heroin. McCaffrey endorsed the Partnership's campaigns and spoke at their news conferences. Later, it worked with state alliance programs.

PDFA was the subject of criticism when it was revealed by Cynthia Cotts of The Village Voice that their federal tax returns showed that they had received several million dollars' worth of funding from major pharmaceutical, tobacco and alcohol corporations including American Brands (Jim Beam whiskey), Philip Morris (Marlboro and Virginia Slims cigarettes, Miller beer), Anheuser Busch (Budweiser, Michelob, Busch beer), R.J. Reynolds (Camel, Salem, Winston cigarettes), as well as pharmaceutical firms Bristol Meyers-Squibb, Merck & Company and Procter & Gamble. In 1997, it discontinued any direct fiscal association with tobacco and alcohol suppliers, although it still receives donations from pharmaceutical and opioid companies.

In 1999, filmmaker Robert Zemeckis made a documentary entitled The Pursuit of Happiness: Smoking, Drinking and Drugging in the 20th Century which made an in-depth examination of the problem of drug use, covering 100 years and interviewing professionals and historians. Zemeckis included Marston in the film.

=== The 2000s ===
In 2002, Burke retired as chairman, and was replaced by Roy J. Bostock. The Partnership had been tracking ecstasy use since 1996, and in 2002 found that 52% of students were aware of the dangers associated with its use as compared to 46% from the year before.

In 2002, the White House director of the Office of National Drug Control Policy, John P. Walters, questioned whether the Partnership's campaigns were lessening the use of illegal drugs. He stated, "The resulting campaign is far too complex, calling as it does for the lockstep shuttling in and out, at 6 to 8 week intervals, of TV, radio, print, outdoor and interactive messages in multiple languages against 36 different strategies aimed at eleven different targets. He raised concerns of improper interpretations of survey data as well as the federal government shifting $50 million away from other media purchases. Partnership chairman James E. Burke argued before a Senate subcommittee for better targeting of funds for media purchases.

In 2010, it collaborated with the Drug Enforcement Administration on a public relations event titled "National Prescription Drug Take-Back Day". The event involved 4,000 "drop spots" to discard unused prescription drugs as a way to lessen opportunities for misuse. In the mid-2000s, the Partnership gradually shifted away from de-emphasizing the risks of marijuana and focused more on targets such as prescription drugs, possibly responding to a shift of emphasis by the U.S. government. Reporter Elizabeth Sprague of CBS News noticed that the Partnership had not produced a single anti-marijuana PSA since 2005. By 2007, the agency had produced over 3,000 spots from 1985 to 2007.

In 2010, the organization changed its name from Partnership for a Drug-Free America to Partnership at Drugfree.org.

A 2013 article by the Center on Juvenile and Criminal Justice describes The Partnership as "...always felt free to lie — blatantly, openly, stupidly — about drugs. In fact, lying to obscure the realities of drug abuse in order to protect powerful interests and constituencies is the reason the Partnership exists. The Partnership is the latest in America's long history of phony lobbies — the Office of National Drug Control Policy (ONDCP) is the White House branch — that revel in misinformation and misdirected policies that perpetuate the social crises they claim to be attacking because they tacitly profit from making them worse." Some studies suggest its PSAs have had "little proven effect on drug use."

In 2013, the Montana Meth Project joined The Partnership To End Addiction.

=== Current approaches ===
The Partnership holds a special position under law within the National Youth Anti-Drug Media Campaign of the Office of National Drug Control Policy. It cooperates with government agencies in initiatives to help reduce drug use. While the organization has focused drug prevention advertising on broadcast media such as television, it has recently shifted media support to digital technology. Currently, it aims to assist parents in prevention efforts. The organization informs and offers resources for parents and teenagers on its website. The Partnership shifted focus towards teenagers' misuse of prescription drugs. The group was part of a campaign known as National Prescription Drug Take Back Day which encouraged residents to dispose of their old prescription drugs to nearby city halls or police departments. Partnership executive Sean Clarkin suggests that parents sit down with their teens and ask "what's going on" as a possible beginning for a conversation about drug use. The Partnership has reduced its commitment to broadcast media and shifted towards reaching out to parents via the Internet, which increased from 10% of its budget to 31% for 2010. It has focused on web efforts such as the site "Time to Talk" (timetotalk.org), The drugfree.org website attracts a million visitors each month. The agency is making a $55 million three-year commitment with cable operator Comcast including its "Time to Talk" campaign.

== See also ==
- Ad Council
- Ginna Marston
- Public service announcement
- This Is Your Brain on Drugs
- I learned it by watching you!
- WeGotYou
- Montana Meth Project
