= Josh Tetrick =

American social entrepreneur and speaker (born 1980)

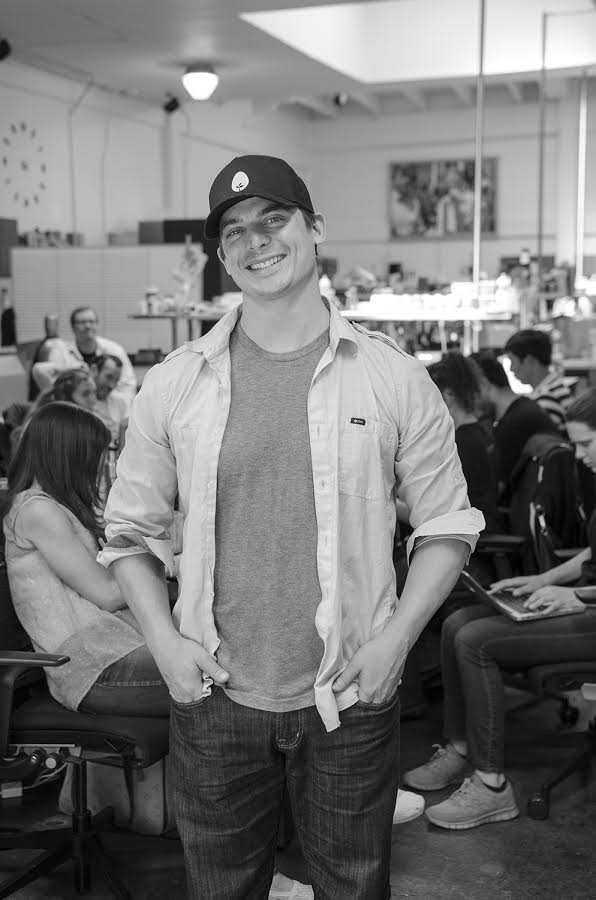
- Born: Joshua Stephen Tetrick; March 23, 1980 (age 46); Birmingham, Alabama
- Education: Bachelor's degree, Juris Doctor
- Alma mater: West Virginia University; Cornell University; University of Michigan Law School
- Occupations: Founder and CEO of Eat Just, Inc.

Joshua Stephen Tetrick (born March 23, 1980) is an American social entrepreneur and speaker. He is currently the CEO of Eat Just, Inc., a food startup company based in Northern California.

Tetrick spent three years in Sub-Saharan Africa working on various social campaigns, including a United Nations initiative in Kenya and teaching street children in multiple African countries as a Fulbright Scholar.

== Early life ==
Joshua Stephen Tetrick was raised in Birmingham, Alabama where he lived until his family relocated to Philadelphia, Pennsylvania. He was a football player in high school and went on to play at West Virginia University, where he shared the scout team player of the year award in 2000. While in law school, Tetrick was diagnosed with hypertrophic cardiomyopathy, a heart condition that he says makes him more appreciative of "life's fragility." The diagnosis meant he could no longer lift weights, or play basketball or football at full speed.

=== Education ===
In 2004, Tetrick received a BA in Africana studies from Cornell University and received a J.D. degree from the University of Michigan Law School. Tetrick was also a participant in the Fulbright Scholar program, although he did not complete it, and taught street children in Nigeria and South Africa before beginning his business career. Tetrick has said in multiple interviews that he spent seven years in Africa, but it was in fact three years.

== Philanthropy ==
Tetrick was hired by the Liberian government to work on the reform of Liberia's investment laws for its president, Ellen Johnson-Sirleaf, a job that he has said in interviews he was not qualified for at the time but learned a tremendous amount in doing. He also worked on other social campaigns, including teaching street children and working to encourage child prostitutes to move away from lives on the streets and into schools. This work formed the basis of the non-profit organization More Than Me. It was in Africa that Tetrick also first noticed serious problems with the global food system.

In January 2011, he launched a crowdfunding website for social startups called 33needs. The venture ended 11 months later, in late 2011.

== Business career ==
After returning from Africa, Tetrick worked for Toms Shoes for a short period of time before launching 33needs. In June 2011, Tetrick developed the idea for Hampton Creek with his friend Josh Balk. The idea stemmed from problems both of them noticed in the global food system. Tetrick began initial business plans and meetings with Khosla Ventures, a Palo Alto-based venture capital firm later that summer. Hampton Creek received its first round of funding in December 2011 and a second round (after a relocation to San Francisco) in June 2012.

Tetrick has been interviewed for his work with Hampton Creek in Bloomberg Businessweek, NPR, and The New York Times. In March 2013, Tetrick and Hampton Creek became one of three companies to be featured in Bill Gates' documentary, The Future of Food. In June 2013 Tetrick spoke at a TED conference in Edmonton, Alberta, Canada on the future of food.

In June 2014, Inc. included Tetrick in its annual "35 Under 35" list. That same month, CNBC named Hampton Creek to its annual "Disruptor 50" list and invited Tetrick to appear live on air with Jim Cramer.

=== Fundraising ===
Tetrick invested $37,000 of his own money into Hampton Creek in 2011, shortly before Khosla Ventures provided $500,000 in seed funding to the company. He is responsible for attracting investors including Li Ka-Shing, Peter Thiel, and Vinod Khosla to Hampton Creek, and his efforts have resulted in a total of $120 million in fundraising for the company.
