= List of Atlantic hurricanes in the 17th century =

The List of Atlantic hurricanes in the 17th century encompasses all known and suspected Atlantic tropical cyclones from the 1600 to 1699. Although records of every storm that occurred do not survive, the information presented here originated in sufficiently populated coastal communities and ships at sea that survived the tempests.

Records of hurricane activity directly impacting America is very incomplete during the 1600s as colonists were sparse outside of the New England region or not existent until much later in the century or early 1700s, especially in the most hurricane prone regions of the coastal south, Florida and the Keys, and Gulf Coast.

== 1600–1624 ==
Year	Area(s) affected	Date (GC)	Deaths	Damage/Notes
1600	Offshore Mexico	12 September	> 60, probably 400	Captain general Pedro de Escobar y Melgarejo commanded Spanish treasure fleet (Flota de Nueva España in Spanish), a convoy of 60 ships that sailed from Cádiz on 15 May. About 20 leagues from Villa Rica de la Vera Cruz, a hurricane struck the fleet. The 300-ton carrack (nao in Spanish) San Antonio de Padua under captaincy of Juan de Morales, the 280-ton carrack Santa Catalina de la Sierra under captaincy of Andrés Ximénez, and a 700-ton mercury-carrying carrack under captaincy of Mateo Letieta sank shortly after the onset of the storm. A 350-ton vessel under captaincy of Rafael Ferrifino disappeared, and another ship vanished from the fleet; both presumably sunk. The storm also wrecked a small patache under a captain Ganucho on the coast of Tabasco; sixty of her men drowned. The surviving ships of the Spanish treasure fleet regrouped into a convoy and continued toward Vera Cruz.
1600	Cuba to offshore Mexico	26–27 September	> 103, probably 600	A weak hurricane moved northeastward through the western Caribbean Sea, dispersing a fleet somewhere north of Havana. The remnant Spanish treasure fleet sighted Veracruz, on 26 September, but a "norther" compelled the fleet to anchor offshore overnight. Some ships anchored in the lee of Isla de Sacrificios, and the storm compelled many to cast their cannon, anchors, and part of their cargoes overboard to prevent capsizing. The carrack (nao in Spanish) under captaincy of Juan Minquez cast 500 ceramic jugs of wine and 160 jugs of olive oil overboard. Before the "norther" diminished, the fleet lost eight more ships. Some accounts combine the effects of the two storms, which together killed about one thousand persons and let to the loss or jettisoning of cargo worth more than 10 million pesos. Some French and English accounts date these storms to 1601, perhaps because of the slow pace of news. Tropical cyclone status in doubt.
1601	Veracruz, Mexico	unknown	1000	N/A Tropical cyclone status in doubt. Quite possibly a duplicate of one or two storms in 1600.
1603	Martinique	1–2 August	unknown	Three ships lost somewhere near Martinique.
1605	Dominican Republic, Haiti to Cuba	29 September	unknown	Landfall near Sabana Port and Sabana-Camagüey Archipelago, Cuba on 29 September.
1605	Nicaragua	unknown	1300	Details from probably the same storm follow. Captain general Luis de Córdova commanded seven treasure-laden galleons of the Armada de Tierra Firma from Cartagena, Colombia. Between Serrana Bank and Serranilla Bank, a hurricane struck the fleet. One ship returned to Cartagena; two others reached Jamaica. The hurricane wrecked the other four galleons on Serranilla Bank. No one survived these four wrecks, and Spanish marine salvage teams traversed the western Caribbean Sea but failed to locate them and recover their lost 8 million pesos. Spanish fishermen from Cuba in 1667 accidentally located at least two of the shipwrecks and recovered some silver coins. Spanish marine salvage expeditions over the next six years failed because of bad weather. Robert F. Marx attempted to salvage the wrecks in 1963 but failed on account of bad weather and rough seas. See List of deadliest Atlantic hurricanes.
1605	Dominican Republic, Haiti to Cuba	unknown	unknown	"Loss of three ships" but "some men escaped." Perhaps the same as the previous storm.
1605	Cumaná, Venezuela	unknown	unknown	"Four galleons" lost near Santa Margarita (perhaps Isla Margarita).
1608	Mexico	3 September		Hurricane made landfall near Veracruz
1609	near Bahamas to Bermuda)	August 4 [O.S. July 25]	unknown	The Tempest of 1609 or The Sea Venture Hurricane of 1609 The Third Supply fleet under Admiral Sir George Somers sailed from England to Jamestown, Virginia, for London Company to deliver Sir Thomas Gates, numerous supplies, and hundreds of new colonists. A "most terrible and vehement storm," a severe West Indian hurricane, struck the fleet about 150 leagues (450 nautical miles (830 km; 520 mi)) from the West Indies and the Bahamas. The 44-hour gale scattered the fleet and sent one vessel immediately to the bottom of the Atlantic Ocean. Four vessels regrouped and arrived quickly in Virginia together; three others followed soon thereafter. The flagship Sea Venture under captaincy of Christopher Newport intentionally ran aground in Bermuda with water in her hold (ship) already 9 feet (2.7 m) deep. All 150 men aboard her survived the storm and landed; from the remains of the Sea Venture and Juniperus bermudiana wood, the castaways then built two new full-rigged pinnaces, Deliverance and Patience. A few passengers died during the 10-month ordeal on Bermuda, and two more stayed on the island to secure the British claim; the remainder, including John Rolfe, boarded the new pinnaces and successfully sailed for Virginia; they arrived in May 1610. Passenger William Strachey tells the story in True Reportory, which likely inspired William Shakespeare to write The Tempest. This event may continue another storm this season.
1609	southeastern Bahamas	unknown	32	N/A This event may continue another storm this season.
1614	Mexico	31 August	unknown	Captain-general Juan de la Cueva y Mendoza commanded the Spanish treasure fleet (Flota de Nueva España) of 41 ships that left Cádiz on 7 July. Seven merchant carracks (naos in Spanish) of this fleet wrecked during the night between Cabo Catoche and Isla Mujeres. These naos carried merchandise worth 1.5 million pesos and 876 quintales (4,033 metric tons (3,969 long tons)??) of mercury. During the storm, this vessel split into two parts and sank so quickly that no one saved anything, "not even the crew or passengers." The fleet reached Veracruz on 4 September, where another vessel ran aground on the shoals.
1615	offshore Mexico	30 August	unknown	Captain-general Martín de Vallecilla commanded the Spanish treasure fleet (Flota de Nueva España) of 41 ships that left Cádiz on 6 July. On 30 August about 20 leagues from "Islas Tranquilo and Arena" (location unknown) in 22 fathoms (132 ft; 40 m) of water, a southeasterly storm struck the fleet. The 400- or 500-ton carrack (nao in Spanish) San Miguel under captaincy of Gaspar Conquero carried a cargo of 700 pipes of wine, 3000 ceramic jugs of wine, 150 boxes of mercury, and 75 bales of general merchandise. During the storm, this vessel split into two parts and sank so quickly that no one saved anything, "not even the crew or passengers." The fleet reached Veracruz on 4 September, where another vessel ran aground on the shoals.
1615	Puerto Rico to Hispaniola	12 September	some	Hurricane San Leoncio of 1615 Caused extensive damage to Cathedral of San Juan Bautista, to the agriculture, and to sugar crops. The furious tempest occurred the day of San Leoncio, Saturday 12 September 1615, three days after full moon. Father Diego de Torres Vargas describes the storm. Arriving Bishop of Puerto Rico, Pedro de Solier y Vargas (OSA) experiences the storm, and it damaged Cathedral of San Juan Bautista. In the aftermath, people covered the cathedral with straw thatch until His Majesty raised 4000 ducats in alms and the proceeds from the auction of the estate of Bishop Fray Martín Vázquez de Arce to cover it properly. The repairs included an arch and two pillars to support the crossing (architecture) of the Cathedral church. A presentment to His Majesty Philip III of Spain, king of Iberian Union, tells of the storm when Captain General Felipe de Beaumont y Navarra served as Governor of Puerto Rico. This document, now archived at General Archive of the Indies, describes a great storm of water and air crashing houses of wood and some of stone, leaving others without door and window tiles. The storm hit the countryside with similar damage with some deaths and injuries to persons; it isolated and destroyed cassava and sugarcane. It drove aground carracks (naos in Spanish) and bajel es from the port with most of their cargo lost. The residents asked the king for a reduction in their tribute. Other commentators note that the storm destroyed the Capital of Puerto Rico.
1616	Cuba	End of September	unknown	Hurricane struck Oriente Province and particularly the city of Bayamo.
1622	Havana, Cuba to Straits of Florida (Florida Keys, Bahamas)	5 September	> 1090	Lope Díez de Armendáriz, marqués de Cadereyta, commanded a convoy of seventeen vessels. A small hurricane of normal intensity struck the convoy south of Cay Sal Bank. This convoy lost two Spanish ships. Millás lists the death toll variously as greater than 1090 and just 90. In another incident that year (or, more likely, in different recollections of the same incident), after six crucial weeks of delays, Spanish treasure fleet and Tierra Firma fleet left Havana for Spain on or about the morning of 4 September despite the reluctance of some ship captains who suspected a brewing storm. Lope Díez de Armendáriz, marqués de Cadereyta, admiral Tomás de Larraspuru, and admiral don Pedro de Pasquier y Esparza jointly commanded the combined fleet of 28 ships: 17 cargo carracks (naos in Spanish), 8 registered treasure galleons, and 3 pataches. A hurricane hit that fleet on 5/6 September in Straits of Florida off Florida Keys. The lead ship Nuestra Señora de Candelaria and 20 other ships then passed west of the Dry Tortugas and safely into the Gulf of Mexico to ride out the storm. Several of these ships were lost, and the hurricane drowned more than 1,000 men aboard. Many of the surviving ships jettisoned cannon and cargo before returning, battered and dismasted, to Havana. Spanish marine salvage operations began within a week and found the Nuestra Señora de Atocha, rescuing her five survivors. Because she sank in water too deep for common salvage operations, however, they recovered little treasure, and 2 fathoms (12 ft; 3.7 m) of sand reportedly buried her remains within a few months. Spanish marine salvage crews located and salvaged Nuestra Señora del Rosario and recovered probably at least half of the treasure from Santa Margarita (shipwreck) during the succeeding several years. Sand buried the remaining treasure. The Spanish treasure fleet did not return to Spain until the next year. Mel Fisher found the Nuestra Señora de Atocha in 1985 363 years later after its sinking. Treasure hunters from Tampa in 1989 identified probable remains of Nuestra Señora de la Merced and recovered a bell and numerous gold bars. Nuestra Señora de Candelaria probably survived, but treasure hunters recently sought her. Mel Fisher Maritime Heritage Museum displays salvaged artifacts salvaged from the wreckage of this fleet. This event may continue as another event this season. See List of deadliest Atlantic hurricanes.
1622	Bermuda	9 September	unknown	Struck at 31°N latitude, 150 leagues from Bermuda. Possibly part of hurricane track from 5 September.
1622	Havana, Cuba	5 October	unknown	A second hurricane struck Havana. The second hurricane broke the Nuestra Señora de Atocha into two parts further spreading the wreck on the sea floor.
1622	Old Bahama Channel	unknown	unknown	Two Spanish merchant carracks (naos in Spanish) left Puerto Rico. Juan de Vargas, Governor of Puerto Rico, wrote to Philip IV of Spain, king of Iberian Union, about their loss in a hurricane in the Bahamian Channel. The account mentions the Nuestra Señora de Atocha shipwreck as occurring in the same year. This event may continue as another event this season.
1623	Cuba	September	250	The Tierra Firma fleet or New Spain armada under captain general Antonio de Oquendo departed Havana on 26 April. The 480-ton Spanish galleon Espíritu Santo el Mayor under captaincy of Antonio de Soto carried 1 million Spanish pesos. At the mouth of the Bahama Channel, a storm generated huge waves that tossed the ships like corks. The Espíritu Santo el Mayor "opened and sank" in the gale or hurricane so quickly that the other ships rescued only 50 of the 300 persons aboard her; the other 250, including her captain, drowned, and Spain totally lost all her treasure. The 600-ton admiral galleon Santísima Trinidad under captaincy of Ysidro de Cepeda sank slowly enough that other vessels of the fleet saved all persons aboard her, and several pataches even recovered 1 million Spanish pesos of treasure. This tragedy occurred either on the high seas off West Palm Beach, Florida, or in nearshore waters of the Ais people on Treasure Coast of Florida. Potter gives a date of 20 April and suggests that the Almiranta, typically used in Spanish to refer to the ship of the admiral of the fleet, was instead a third lost vessel. Rappaport dates this storm to September.
1623	Saint Kitts	29 September	150–250	The hurricane destroyed the first tobacco crop that the English planted on Saint Kitts. It also struck Federal Dependencies of Venezuela.
1623	Cuba	early October	unknown	Antonio de Oquendo commanded a fleet, which a hurricane struck in the Old Bahama Channel, sinking two vessels. Possibly identical with the Saint Kitts hurricane. Alternatively, this account may duplicate the previous storm.

== 1625–1649 ==
Year	Area(s) affected	Date (GC)	Deaths	Damage/Notes
1625	Bahamas	11–12 August	unknown	A hurricane passed through the Bahamas Channel
1626	Puerto Rico	15 September	38	Hurricane San Nicomedes of 1626 (or perhaps erroneously as Santa Catalina de Genova), this storm sank three ships in the bay of San Juan. Cayetano Coll y Toste writes of this storm, which occurred the year after Battle of San Juan (1625), which ruined large portions of the city. The storm destroyed plantations and limited the supply of cassava bread. River floods killed cattle and horses. Captain general Juan de Haro y Sanvítores, governor of Puerto Rico, reported that the currents killed 22 persons in the city, and that in one house in the countryside, 16 persons died. The loss of three cargo ships left nude survivors. Bernardo de Balbuena then served as bishop of San Juan. The bell tower of the convent of Saint Dominic collapsed, bringing down its vault (architecture) and the walls of the building and leaving the Religious without their cells. The tempest left the main chapel in a state that the religious celebrated Mass and Liturgy of the Hours elsewhere in its aftermath.
1628	Mexico	unknown	unknown	Made landfall near Mérida, Yucatán, Mexico.
1631	Gulf of Mexico	21 October	> 300	Admiral Manuel Serrano commanded Spanish treasure fleet (Flota de Nueva España in Spanish) of 19 ships, carrying 3,644,198 pesos in silver and gold, 5,408 arrobas (135,200 pounds (61,300 kg)) of cochineal, 3,879 arrobas (96,975 pounds (43,987 kg)) of inferior cochineal, 15,413 arrobas (385,325 pounds (174,780 kg)) of indigo (probably Indigofera tinctoria), 10,018 pounds (4,544 kg) of Chinese silk, 71,788 hide (skin), 6,858 quintales (685,800 pounds (311,100 kg)) of Caesalpinia echinata (brazilwood), 7,972 quintales (797,200 pounds (361,600 kg)) of Haematoxylum campechianum (palo de Campeche in Spanish), 119 boxes of chocolate, and 91 quintales (9,100 pounds (4,100 kg)) of molasses. The fleet left Veracruz for Havana and Spain on 14 October. A week after leaving port, a hurricane struck the fleet, and no vessel emerged intact.: The es:capitana (nave), Nuestra Señora del Juncal, sank 8 leagues north of "Bajo de las Áreas" (location unknown), and 35 of the 335 persons aboard her escaped in a small boat; the other 300 presumably drowned. The Spanish never located the wreck nor salvaged any of its cargo.; The carrack (nao in Spanish) San Antonio under captaincy of Antonio de Lajust wrecked 1 league "windward of the port of Tabasco"; marine salvage recovered most of its cargo of cochineal.; The carrack (nao in Spanish) under captaincy of Baltasar de Espinoza (or de España) wrecked very close to the port of Tabasco, and divers recovered 164,954 pesos in specie, 23 silver bars, 50 marcos in silver objects, and 9 marcos in golden objects.; Two other merchant carracks (naos in Spanish) wrecked on the coast of Campeche, but marine salvage recovered nothing from them.; The other 14 ships of this fleet vanished to an obscure fate; most likely, they sunk at sea without survivors. Tropical cyclone status in doubt. Marx in one account labels the storm a "norther," which could refer either to an especially ferocious cold front or to the western semicircle of a hurricane.
1634	western Cuba	5 October	40	A merchant carrack (nao in Spanish), carrying maestre de campo Francisco Riaño y Gamboa to Spain, sank in the port of Mariel, Cuba. A treasure galleon of Spanish treasure fleet under captaincy of Lope de Hoces wrecked in Florida. Indians apparently partially salvaged the wreckage. Luis de Horruytiner, governor of Florida, and his divers and canoes nevertheless recovered 100,000 pesos in registered treasure and took it to St. Augustine, Florida. On 20 December, the governor wrote to Antonio de Oquendo in Havana, relating this account.
1635	Windward Islands, Saint Kitts, Martinique	August		A violent hurricane struck between St. Kitts and Martinique
1635	Connecticut, Rhode Island, Massachusetts	August 25 [O.S. August 16]	46+	Great Colonial Hurricane of 1635. Was a powerful New England hurricane that struck the Massachusetts Bay Colony in 1635 and was the Pilgrims first experience with a hurricane as it struck fifteen years after the Mayflower arrived at Plymouth Rock. Made landfall near Narragansett Bay. Eye of hurricane passed between Boston and Plymouth and caused a storm surge of 4.3-6.1m (14–20 ft) in Narragansett, Rhode Island and Boston, Massachusetts. Due to strong winds, heavy rainfall, and high tide, hundreds of trees were toppled and nearly all homes were destroyed.
1638	Rhode Island, Massachusetts and New England coast	August 13 [O.S. August 3]		Caused very high tides in Narragansett Bay and Rhode Island, but unknown if made landfall
1638	Saint Kitts (formerly Saint Christopher Island)	August 15 [O.S. August 5]	unknown	Saint Christopher Island experienced a severe tropical storm. Peter Minuit (the man credited with buying the island of Manhattan from the Native Americans in exchange for traded goods) died during this hurricane at sea. On Peter's return from New Sweden in 1638, his ship made a side trip to the Caribbean to pick up a load of tobacco. While having dinner aboard a Dutch ship a hurricane forced all ships out to sea. Minuit and 't Vliegende Hart died during the storm. However, his ship the Kalmar Nyckel did make it back to Sweden without him. Unlikely connected storm with three 1838 storms affecting New England coastline this year given the date.
1638	Rhode Island, Massachusetts and New England coast	October 5 [O.S. September 25]		Rain, winds, caused high tides in river and bay, but did little damage. Hurricane out at sea.
1638	Rhode Island, Massachusetts and New England coast	October 19 [O.S. October 9]		Rain, winds. Did little damage. Hurricane encountered out at sea by few ships.
1638	offshore South Puerto Rico	October	unknown	French and English began to clear land on Saint Croix with Dutch assistance. They also opened trails, constructed dwellings, and traded with Carib people for two months. A "storm" or "tempest" threw two of their vessels onto the coastal reefs off Coamo, Puerto Rico. Two weakened survivors reached the shore aboard a longboat, and Spanish authorities took them prisoner and interrogated them. A sick Frenchman died within a few days, and they took the other prisoner to San Juan, Puerto Rico. Captain general Iñigo de la Mota Sarmiento, then Governor of Puerto Rico, wrote of these events on 6 April 1639.
1640	Havana, Cuba	11 September	unknown	It disrupted a Dutch West India Company fleet commanded by Cornelis Jol "Peg Leg", poised to attack the Spanish treasure fleet off the coast of Havana, Cuba, during the Eighty Years' War. It affected 36 vessels and wrecked four of the ships ashore. Nearly all their sailors drowned to death except 260 saved.
1641	Hispaniola to Florida	27 September	many	Many people perished from eight lost ships. Captain general (or admiral) Juan de Campos commanded the Spanish treasure fleet from Havana through Old Bahama Channel (or the northern extension of Straits of Florida) for Spain. During the Eighty Years' War, es:Armada de Barlovento protected Spanish ships returning from the Caribbean. A hurricane struck the fleet at 30°N latitude on 27 September and drove four ships back toward Cuba. Two of these ships wrecked near Havana, a third ship wrecked 6 leagues from Santiago de Cuba, and a fourth successfully returned to the port of Havana. Four merchant carracks (naos in Spanish) wrecked without survivors. The hurricane wrecked the patache of the fleet also wrecked; a priest and other survivors attempted to swim ashore, but sharks ate them all. Another patache from Havana located the wrecked patache 5 leagues from the Florida coast with some survivors still aboard her. Other ships in the convoy survived the storm with such damage that they later sank on the high seas. The storm also separated the 680-ton almiranta galleon Nuestra Señora de la la Limpia y Pura Concepción under captaincy of Hernando Rodríquez from the remainder of the fleet; she drifted without mast (sailing) or rudder and wrecked on the north side of Abreojos (now Silver Bank) off Hispaniola. More than six hundred persons aboard her swam to a nearby sandbar and constructed makeshift rafts and boats from the wreck. Two hundred survivors then traveled toward Santo Domingo, but most perished before the few survivors reached that destination. Although authorities in Santo Domingo sent a vessel to rescue the stranded, no one survived on the sandbar when it returned. Sir William Phips of Britain in 1687 operated from Port Royal, Jamaica, to recover more than 2 million pesos of silver—twice the registered amount of treasure—from this sunken galleon, setting a world record for value of treasure recovered from a shipwreck. Bermudian and other marine salvage operations of his era recovered more treasure. Burt Webber circa 1979 nevertheless found more valuable cargo: more than 95,000 silver coins, Ming Dynasty ceramics, gold chains, and other artifacts.
1642	Windward Islands, Martinique	Unknown		Father Jean-Baptiste Du Tertre, a Dominican missionary to the Antilles, accounted three hurricanes in 1642
1642	Guadeloupe, Martinique, Saint Kitts	September	many	Father Jean-Baptiste Du Tertre, a Dominican missionary to the Antilles, accounted three hurricanes in 1642 and describes this second one as the worst. This storm struck Guadeloupe, Martinique, and Saint Kitts (then called Saint Christopher) hardest. It featured extraordinarily violent winds and abundant rains and lasted 24 hours. At Saint Christopher, it drove 23 fully laden ships ashore, drowning many among their crews. Several sources suggest that Dutch admiral Michiel de Ruyter lost a ship in the storm; others place him far from the Antilles and suggest that he lost no ships. Juan Damián López de Haro, who arrived as bishop of Puerto Rico in 1644, wrote a letter to a friend, describing the aftermath of the hurricane in his diocese. He noted that it destroyed the transept of a parish church, pulled trees and huts, and left the soil barren. It also killed most crops, pigs, and cattle, leading authorities to import cassava and maize from Isla Margarita to feed the needy survivors. A hurricane also struck Santo Domingo. At Saint Kitts and Nevis, several ships containing tobacco ran aground and poisoned the water, killing thousands of fish.
1642	Martinique	Unknown		Father Jean-Baptiste Du Tertre, a Dominican missionary to the Antilles, accounted three hurricanes in 1642
1643	Antigua, Barbuda	20–21 August	unknown	A hurricane affected Antigua and Barbuda
1643	Bahamas	Unknown		A fleet of thirty Spanish ships and galleons from Tierra Firme laden with treasure sailing into the Bahamas encountered a powerful hurricane. The great treasure ship Nuestra Señora de la Concepción was forced onto a reef and hundreds drown from the sinking of treasure ships. The reefs were named the "Silver Shoals" and the channels for passage named "The Silver passage" after the silver on the treasure ship was lost during this storm.
1644	Western Cuba, Straits of Florida (Florida Keys)	October	~1100	According to a later history of Franciscan priest-historian Diego López de Cogolludo, an English pirate armada of 13 hulk (medieval ship type) (urcas in Spanish) carrying 1500 men under Jacob Jackson (possibly William Jackson (pirate)) encountered this storm. In September, the fleet captured two Franciscan priests, Antonio Vazquez and Andres Navarro, from a village in Mexico; the vessel also held eight other Spanish prisoners. Three vessels stranded on arcas (perhaps rocks), and ten continued for Havana. Before leaving Old Bahama Channel, they suffered a violent southeasterly hurricane during which nine of the ten ships sank. During a lull in the storm (perhaps the eye), the sole surviving ship deposited the ten Spaniards ashore, allegedly in Florida but perhaps in Cuba. The hurricane resumed from the opposite direction, and the ship sank also. Despite great hardships, the Franciscans eventually arrived in Havana to tell the tale. See List of deadliest Atlantic hurricanes.
1646	Cuba	17 October	unknown	A hurricane made landfall near Sierra de los Órganos in Pinar del Río Province, Cuba
1649	Virginia	unknown	unknown	Damaged tobacco crop

== 1650–1674 ==
Year	Area(s) affected	Date (GC)	Deaths	Damage/Notes
1650	Saint Kitts	Unknown	numerous	Father Jean-Baptiste Du Tertre wrote in his history of greatly violent storms that threw 28 ships on the roadstead of Saint Christopher (probably Basseterre on Saint Kitts). The disaster included sailors drowned and merchandise lost. Du Tertre notes that Dutch Admiral Michiel de Ruyter avoided misfortune in the storm, but he probably passed the year near the Barbary Coast. José Carlos Millás suggests that the center of the hurricane passed north of the island. Two hurricanes caused this disaster, and the 28 merchantmen of different nationalities lost more than a half-million pound sterling in cargo value.
1651	Martinique	Unknown		N/A
1652	Leeward Islands	23–24 September	Many	Prince Rupert of the Rhine, an English Royalist cavalier, commanded a privateer fleet of several ships. His fleet crossed the Atlantic in late spring 1652 with his brother Prince Maurice of the Palatinate aboard a vessel, traveling through the Antilles from Saint Lucia to the Virgin Islands. The fleet left the Virgin Islands on September 8 [O.S. August 29], sailing several leagues north-northeastward with four ships. The fleet encountered a "great northern sea," swells from a fierce storm farther north, on September 15 [O.S. September 5]. Father Pierre Pelleprat at Saint Kitts related that the hurricane destroyed four or five loaded merchant vessels at Sandy Point Town. A large Dutch fluyt "resisted the sea" and enabled him to aid "two men that only awaited death behind this ship." This terrible hurricane hit the fleet of Prince Rupert of the Rhine on September 23 [O.S. September 13] and scattered the ships. The men aboard the Swallow, including Prince Rupert, took in most of their sails; the storm destroyed the remaining sails. In the northerly hurricane, the Swallow passed within a half-league of Sombrero, Anguilla, and near Anguillita before increasingly easterly winds took him and his vessel to anchorage near an uninhabited island among the Virgin Islands. Meanwhile, the hurricane scattered the fleet, driving the Honest Seaman ashore on Porto Pina in Hispaniola. The Defiance with Prince Maurice of the Palatinate aboard her vanished into obscurity, probably sinking in the hurricane with her crew; another ship and her crew shared her fate. The hurricane subsided after three or four days, ending on 25/26 September [O.S. 15/16 September]. José Carlos Millás suggests that a slow-moving hurricane battered islands from Martinique through Puerto Rico and parts of Hispaniola with the center passing just south of Saint Martin. Prince Rupert gradually recognized the loss of his brother and grieved terribly. Still, he captured four ships as prizes in the Antilles before returning to Nantes in France early the next year. Cardinal Mazarin bought the ships and stores; Prince Rupert split the limited profit spoils with exiled Charles II of England.
1653	Barbados to Saint Vincent Island	13 July	Many	Father Meland and Father Pierre Pelleprat sailed from Martinique on 20 June 1653 but becalmed in the bays off the east coast of Saint Vincent (island). The men aboard the ship unfurled the sails, and after the hurricane arose suddenly, the ship moved away from the coast, evading the dangers associated with running aground. Father Guillaume Aubergeon lived on the island when a violent hurricane overturned the huts and threw many into the sea. It "caused the deaths of many savages" (Carib people) uprooted plants, and damaged the landscape. José Carlos Millás relates the loss of one ship and crew lost at Saint Vincent (island). He also suggests that this hurricane probably also struck Barbados given the normal track of tropical cyclones in the easterlies.
1653	Saint Vincent Island	1 October		N/A
1656	Guadeloupe	4 August	Unknown	Jean-Baptiste Du Tertre reported on a fearful, tremendous hurricane that desolated Guadeloupe. It destroyed most houses, killed all domestic animals, laid waste all plantations, wrecked every vessel at anchor in the roadstead, and drowned most of their crews.
1656	Antilles	Unknown		N/A
1657	Offshore of Bahamas	Unknown	Unknown	Within the Tierra Firme fleet from Veracruz, Veracruz, Nuestra Señora de las Maravillas collided with another Spanish vessel despite good weather and sunk in the Straits of Florida with 5 million pesos of silver. Several marine salvage operators aimed to recover this silver. This storm sunk two small marine salvage vessels with considerable recovered treasure off the south side of Gorda Cay (now Castaway Cay). The survivors recovered and buried the treasure on the island until Spanish ships came to their rescue and removed most of the treasure the following year. The Spanish ultimately recovered 1.5 million pesos of silver from the original wreck.
1657	Guadeloupe	Unknown		N/A A tropical cyclone struck Guadeloupe
1658	Antilles	Unknown		N/A
1660	Antilles	Unknown		N/A
1661	Veracruz, Mexico	14 August		This tropical storm caused several damages in San Juan de Ulúa and Veracruz, Mexico.
1664	Cuba	September		A hurricane made landfall at Havana, Cuba
1664	Guadeloupe	22 October		Massive crop damage; nearly caused famine
1665	Veracruz, Mexico	15 September		The depression or tropical storm caused damages in Veracruz, Mexico.
1665	Leeward Islands	August		N/A
1665	Caribbean Islands	October		N/A
1666	Martinique and Guadeloupe	August 14–15 [O.S. August 4–5]	< 2000	This storm struck Marie-Galante, Îles des Saintes, and the rest of Guadeloupe. It also struck Saint Christopher (now Saint Kitts) and Martinique. English Admiral Francis Willoughby, 5th Baron Willoughby of Parham, commanded a fleet of 17 sail and 2000 troops. The hurricane destroyed the fleet and killed the admiral. At least two ship survived. See List of deadliest Atlantic hurricanes.
1666	Leeward Islands	1 September		N/A
1666	Puerto Rico	Unknown		A hurricane made landfall at San Juan, Puerto Rico
1667	Barbados, Nevis	19 August		N/A
1667	Saint Kitts	1 September		N/A
1667	Outer Banks, North Carolina to Virginia	September 6 [O.S. August 27]	Many people	The Dreadful Hurricane of 1667 First colonial record of a hurricane in Virginia. Hurricane made landfall just to the northeast of Jamestown, Virginia. The hurricane lasted 24 hours, bringing with it violent winds, heavy rains, and a 3.7 m (12 ft) storm surge. Approximately 10,000 houses were destroyed. The colonists’ tobacco and corn crops were lost, their cattle drowned, and their ships were greatly damaged. Considered to be one of the most severe hurricanes to ever strike Virginia. Rain was reported to have fallen for twelve straight days after the storm.
1669	Nevis to Cuba to North Carolina	17–23 August	182	N/A
1669	Saint Kitts	September	Unknown	Twenty five ships lost
1670	Near Barbados	18 August		N/A
1670	Jamaica	7 October	Unknown	Drove English fleet of ships ashore
1671	Mexico	22–25 September		A hurricane made landfall in Mexico
1672	Venezuela to Mexico	September		A hurricane made landfall in Caracas, Venezuela and then later made landfall in San Juan de Ulúa, Mexico
1673	Puerto Rico	Unknown	Few	One ship wrecked, all made it safe to shore
1674	Bay of Campeche	June		N/A
1674	Barbados	10 August	200	N/A
1674	St. Augustine, Florida	19 August		Likely continuation of above. A hurricane known as the Great Storm of 1674 hits near Saint Augustine, and severely damages the town, property, crops, its fort from rough seas and flooding.

== 1675–1699 ==
– only paleotempestological evidence

Year	Area(s) affected	Date (GC)	Deaths	Damage/Notes
1675	Connecticut, Rhode Island, Boston	September 7 [O.S. August 28]		The Second Great Colonial Hurricane or The New England Hurricane of 1675. A hurricane said to be almost as powerful as the 1635 New England Hurricane swept the New England coastal region. Blew down many trees in Connecticut, Rhode Island, and Massachusetts, and destroyed wharves. Older colonists that experienced the 1635 hurricane said this one had similar characteristics placing it among New England's most destructive storms.
1675	Barbados	10 September	200	N/A
1675	Cuba to Mexico	15–22 September		A hurricane made landfall at Havana, Cuba on 15 September and then later made landfall in Campeche, Mexico on 22 September
1676	Bay of Campeche, Mexico	June		A hurricane from the Bay of Campeche destroys all of William Dampier's logging camp and washes away all of his equipment near the southern end of Mexico. Dampier's detailed description of this hurricane has been recognized as the first accurate description given of a hurricane event. Dampier becomes a Buccaneer after this event
1678	Mexico	2–13 September		A hurricane made landfall at San Juan de Ulúa, Mexico
1678	Mexico	14–19 September		Another hurricane made landfall at San Juan de Ulúa, Mexico several days later in the same season
1680	Martinique	3 August	Many	22 Ships lost
1680	Barbados to Dominican Republic to British Isles	11 August–23	Many	Wrecked 25 French ships and several Spanish ships. Landfall near Santo Domingo, later caused shipwrecks in the British Isles while extratropical; track produced in 2009 based on ship data
1681	St. Kitts and Nevis	6 September	N/A	At least one house blown down.
1681	Western Caribbean Sea	N/A	"Considerable from drowning"	N/A
1681	Saint Kitts and Nevis	14 October	N/A	Roof of same house as the September hurricane blown off again. Twenty-five of the thirty or so horses perished on a ship owned by two New Englanders, Captain Cushing and Captain Clark off the coast of Nevis.
1683	North Carolina, Virginia to Connecticut	August 23 [O.S. August 13]	N/A	Strong winds and torrential rain. Reported to cause tremendous flooding of rivers in Connecticut. Reported by Increase Mather and John Pike.
1683	North Atlantic	August 26–31 [O.S. September 5–10]		William Dampier described a vivid account of this hurricane, 3 days after setting sail from Virginia in his book A Voyage to New Holland (1703).
1683	Venezuela	22 October		A hurricane made landfall at Curaçao, Venezuela
1683	Florida East Coast	Unknown	496	N/A
1686	South Carolina	September 4–5 [O.S. August 25–26]		The Spanish Repulse Hurricane of 1686. The Spanish attacked the English South Carolina settlement near Beaufort/Stuart Town. A hurricane came and destroyed all of the houses, flooded the town, killed cattle, ruined crops, and knocked down a great number of trees. The Spanish ships were all washed ashore and they had to abandon the attack.
1689	Nevis	N/A	Half the inhabitants of the island	N/A
1689	Jamaica	unknown	unknown	Hurricane not very severe
1691	Antilles	Unknown		N/A
1692	Havana, Cuba	24 October		Devastating hurricane destroyed over half of the sugar mills and much of the sugar cane crop in west Cuba. Destroyed many buildings in Havana. Governor Manzaneda issued orders that owners of the sugar mills, ranchers, and merchants, to pay for reopening the roads and ordered all slaves who worked in Havana to work clearing the streets and port. Sank a supply ship near Key Biscayne.
1692	Jamaica	N/A	100	A "dreadful hurricane" (Oldmixon) struck the island shortly after a severe earthquake.
~1692	Belize	N/A	N/A	A major hurricane landfall identified in sediment cores from the Great Blue Hole.
1693	Mid-Atlantic states to New England	October 29 [O.S. October 19]	N/A	The Accomack Storm of 1693. Created new inlets, flooding. May have had a significant effect on the New York City area and Fire Island, but little historical documentation is available. May have been similar to Hurricane Sandy 319 years later.
1694	Barbados	13 August		N/A
1694	Barbados	27 September	1000+	See List of deadliest Atlantic hurricanes
1694	Barbados	17 October		N/A
1695	Florida Keys	4 October	N/A	A large ship is wrecked in the Florida Keys due to a passing hurricane
1695	Martinique	October	600	N/A
1696	Western Cuba	N/A	N/A	Heavy flooding, 1 ship lost
1696	South Florida East Coast	October 3–4 [O.S. September 23–24]	N/A	A hurricane of unknown strength impacted South Florida. Jonathan Dickinson, a Quaker merchant, and several of his traveling companions aboard the bark Reformation fell victim to the high seas whipped up by the storm. Tossed and battered by persistent wind and waves, the Reformation wrecked on a sandbar near what is today known as Jupiter Inlet. In his journal, Jonathan Dickinson reported that the bark Nantwitch wrecked somewhat to the north in the same storm.
1698	Pensacola, Florida	12 December		A minimal hurricane made landfall near Pensacola, Florida on 12 December

== See also ==
- List of Atlantic hurricanes
- Atlantic hurricane season
