= Botija =

Botija or Botijas may refer to:

- Botija (container), ceramic shipping container widely used in the Spanish Empire
- Botija (instrument), the container used as a musical instrument.
- Botija, Cáceres, a municipality in the province of Cáceres, Extremadura, Spain
- Botijas, a barrio in the municipality of Orocovis, Puerto Rico
- Botijas River of Puerto Rico
- El Botija, fictional character played by Édgar Vivar
- La Botija, village in Ayacucho Department, San Luis, Argentina
- Botija de mi país, 1987 album by Uruguayan musician Rubén Rada
- Rafael Pérez Botija, Spanish songwriter (see Category:Songs written by Rafael Pérez-Botija)

== See also ==
- Botijo, a traditional Spanish porous clay container designed to contain water
