= Botijuela =

Botijuela may refer to:

- Botija (container), ceramic shipping container commonly used in the Spanish Empire
- Botija (instrument), the container used as a musical instrument
- Botijuela, a town and several geographic features in the vicinity of the Antofalla volcano in northwestern Argentina
- Cayo Botijuela, a small island close to Culebra, Puerto Rico
- La Botijuela, 1863 Spanish translation of Plautus's Aulularia by Ramón Emeterio Betances
