= Fisher Museum =

Fisher Museum may refer to:

- USC Fisher Museum of Art at the University of Southern California
- The Fisher Museum in the Harvard Forest in Petersham, Massachusetts
- Mel Fisher Maritime Heritage Museum in Key West, Florida
- Mel Fisher's Treasure Museum in Sebastian, Florida
