= Stamna (musical instrument) =

Greek musical instrument

Percussion instrument
- Classification: Idiophone

The Stamna (Greek: Σταμνά) is a plosive aerophone (in this case implosive) and an idiophone of the Greece.

== Circle Stamna ==
102 cm Primeter * 34 cm Height

== Stamna with orifice ==
102 cm Primeter * 42 cm Height

== Traditional Stamna ==
90 cm Primeter * 50 cm Height

== See also ==
- Amphora
- Botija (instrument)
- Ghatam
- Udu
