= Olive jar =

Spanish ceramics in archaeology

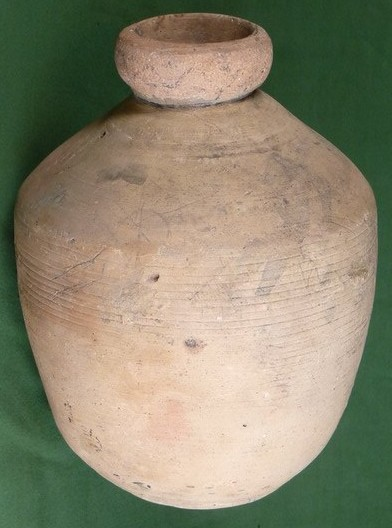
A 17th-century botija perulera from Seville. The egg-shaped botija was the most common form of olive jar.

Spanish olive jars are ceramic containers produced in the 15th through the 19th centuries and used for transporting various products to Spanish colonies. Olive jars are commonly found in archaeological sites throughout the former Spanish Empire, including shipwrecks, and have also been found at sites that were never under Spanish control. Variations in the form of individual olive jars have been used by archaeologists to date sites in which olive jars and sherds have been found.

== Names ==
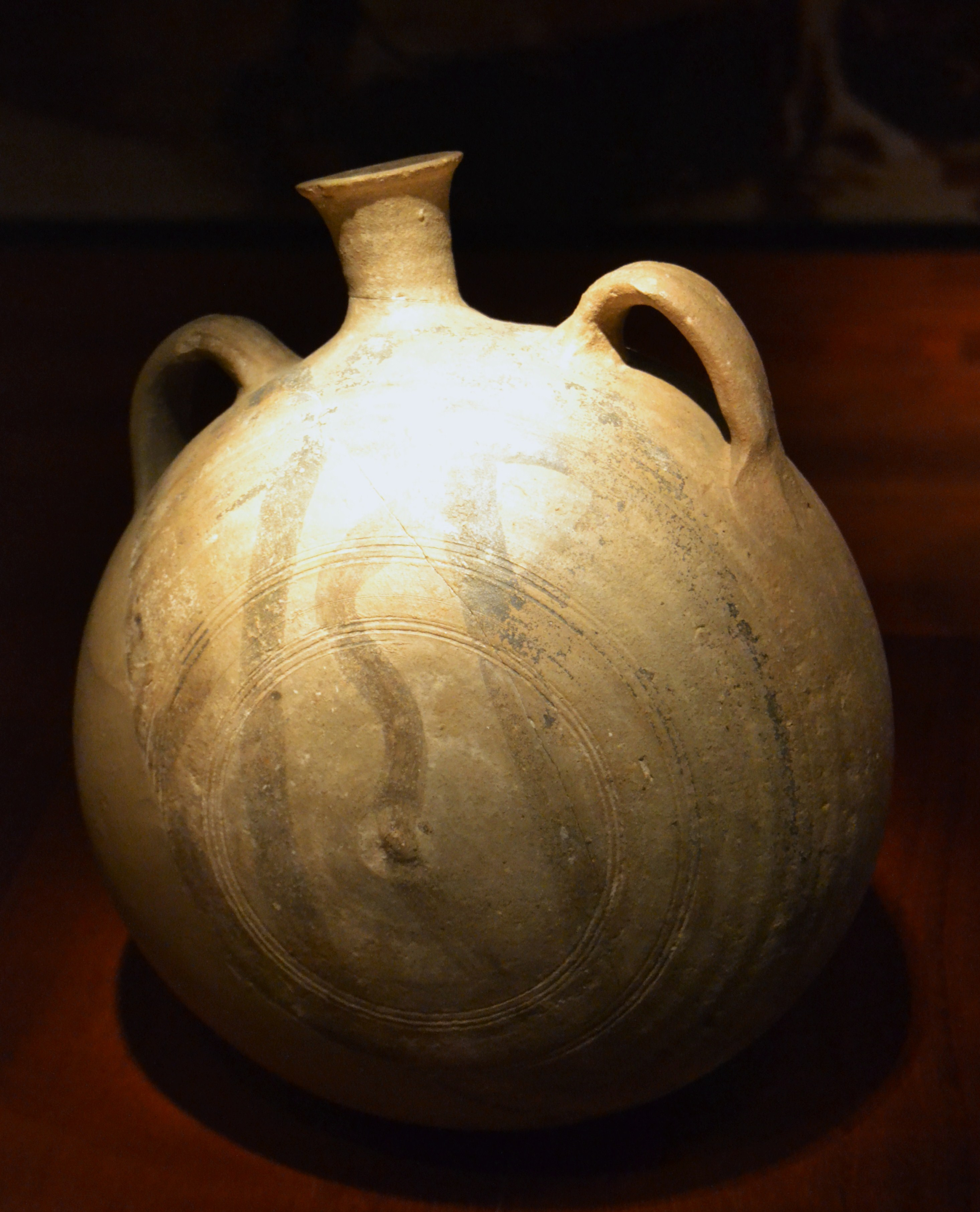
Cantimplora, used in Spanish commerce until about 1580

The term "Spanish Olive Jar" was introduced by William Henry Holmes in 1903, as he believed a specific type of sherd found in archaeological sites in America came from jars that had been used to ship olives to America. American archaeologists have since then often called Spanish-produced ceramic containers found at archaeological sites "olive jars" or "Spanish olive jars". They have been inconsistent in their use of "olive jar", varying between "olive jar" as a name for all Spanish ceramics, and as a name for the most common type, the botija, which has a distinctive form and paste. Other types of Spanish ceramics that are sometimes called "olive jars", and sometimes "Spanish storage jars" include the cantimplora, tinaja, and orza. American archaeologists recognize that olive jars were used to transport and store many products other than olives, but the term is in wide-spread use, and not easily replaced. Spanish records also refer to botijas peruleras, botijas medias, botijuela, botijuelas peruleras, botixuelas, anforas, and anforetas as alternate names for botijas.

== Production ==
The production of botijas was concentrated in Andalusia, with Seville being the most important center of ceramic production in the Iberian Peninsula during the Early modern period. The Casa de Contratación de Indias (the institution that controlled trade with the New World) was established in Seville in 1503, where it remained until it was transferred to Cádiz in 1717. The need for ceramic containers to hold merchandise sent to the New World led to development of potters' neighborhoods in Seville and Cádiz. Some jars with a distinctive red paste and a different style of rim marks may have been produced in Cazalla de la Sierra, 75 km north-northeast of Seville. Cazalla was an important wine-producing area, and botijas of wine from Cazalla were listed on several manifests of shipments to the New World.

== Form ==
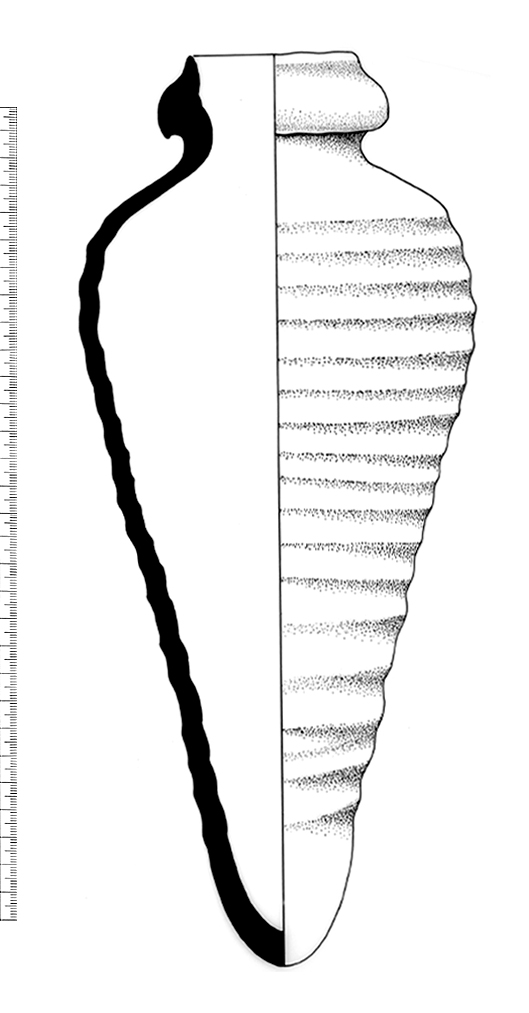
Carrot-shaped "olive jar" (botija) found on the Isle of Wight

While the term "olive jar" was used in archaeology from early in the 20th century, John Mann Goggin created the first typology for olive jars in the mid-20th century. He recognized Early, Middle, and Late styles based primarily on the stratigraphic sequence of styles and of the paste used in jars found at several archaeological sites. Goggin's Early Style, produced from about 1500 to 1580, which is approximately globular with handles flanking the rim, has since been recognized as the cantimplora. His Middle and Late styles, which are generally egg-shaped, or less often, globular or carrot-shaped, with rounded bottoms and without handles, are now recognized as botijas. Other authors have refined and expanded Goggin's typology. Botijas were unglazed, glazed only on the interior, or glazed on the interior and exterior.

== Function ==
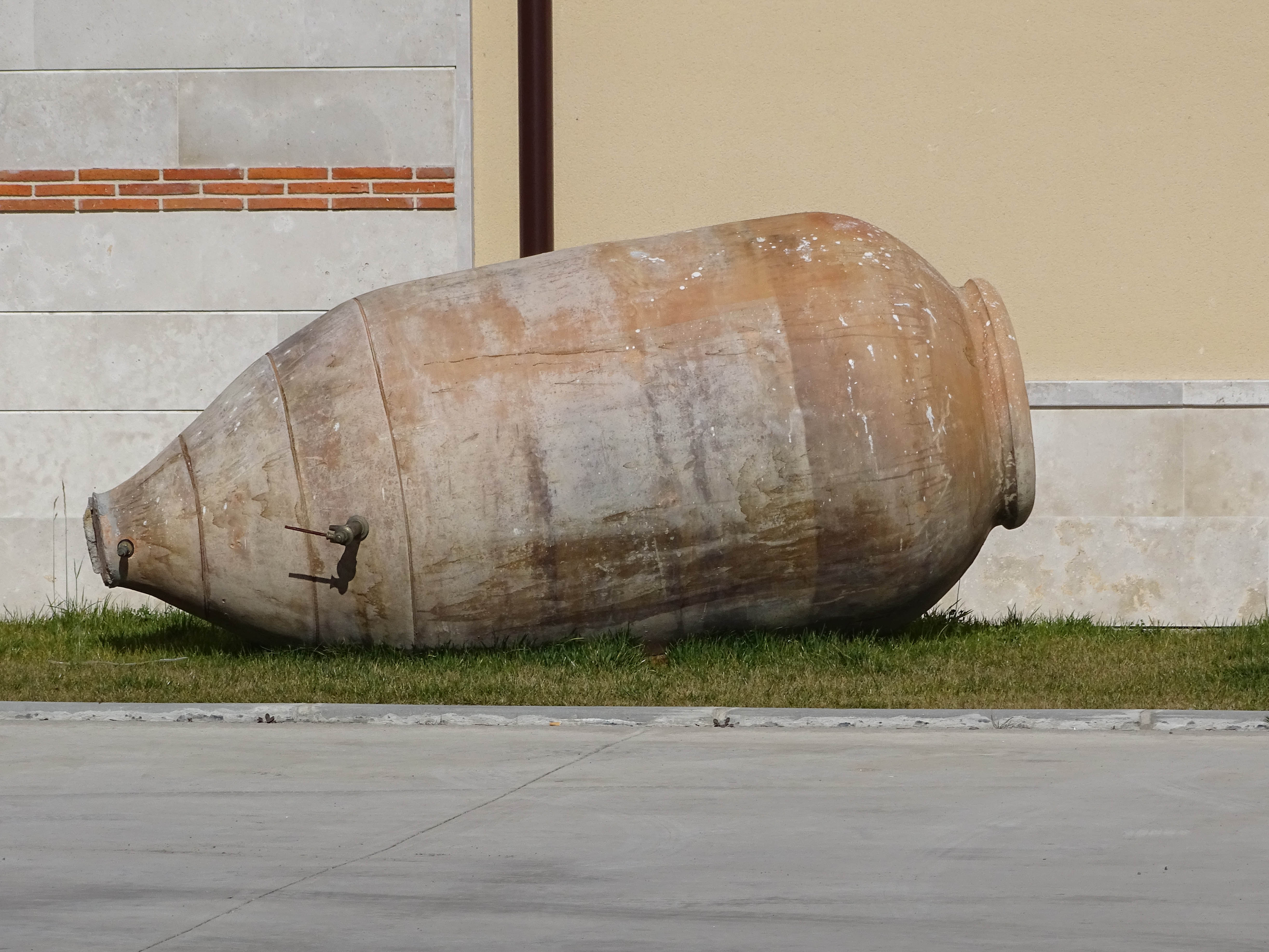
Tinaja

Olive jars were the primary shipping containers in the Spanish Empire, but were also used in wider trade networks. Olive jars were used to transport and store solid and liquid goods. Lists of contents of botijas shipped from Seville to the New World included wine, olive oil, olives, vinegar, chickpeas, capers, beans, honey, fish, rice, flour, and soap. Pitch has been found in intact jars, and records from the early 1590s in St. Augustine show that turpentine, almonds, capers, honey, medicinals, lard, hazelnuts, syrup, and salt pork were stored in olive jars. Olive jars have been found in shipwrecks that still contained olive pits, pitch, and soap.

Goods were shipped on Spanish ships in crates, barrels, bundles, baskets, and other containers, but in the 16th century, the most common types of shipping containers on Spanish ships were botijas. Other types of containers generally had larger capacities than did botijas. For instance, a pipa (a wooden cask equivalent to the English pipe) held 480 litres, equivalent to 22 large botijas. Botijas were wrapped with wicker or matting, which cushioned the jars and gave a means of handling the jars with attached handles of rope. They could be transported on land in carts, on horses, or by human porters.

== Dating ==
Jars found on shipwrecks of known date help establish a time line for changes in jar styles. The form of the rim around the mouth of botijas changed gradually from triangular in cross-section in the late 16th and early 17th centuries to more rounded in the mid-17th century to very rounded with a protruding lip by the early 18th century. The changes can help date sites, although not precisely.

Identifying marks have been found on the rims of botijas produced late in the 16th century and the first half of the 17th century. The marks appear to represent the merchant shipping the jars or the intended recipient of the jar. Some ship manifests have been found on which the merchant or purchaser and the mark on the jars are listed. The rim marks (as well as the shape of the rims) changed over time, and those changes can be used for approximately date jars. No marked rims have been reliably dated to before 1583 or after 1641.

Some jars with a distinctive red paste and a different style of rim marks may have been produced in Cazalla de la Sierra, 75 km (47 mi) north-northeast of Seville. Cazalla was an important wine-producing area, and botijas of wine from Cazalla were listed on several manifests of shipments to the New World. Such jars have been found at the Santo Domingo Monastery in Antigua Guatemala, the Huaco Palomin site in Peru, and Santa Elena (in South Carolina), and in wrecks of ships in the Spanish Armada of 1588 and, possibly, in the Nuestra Señora de Atocha wreck in the Florida Keys.

== Archaeological finds ==
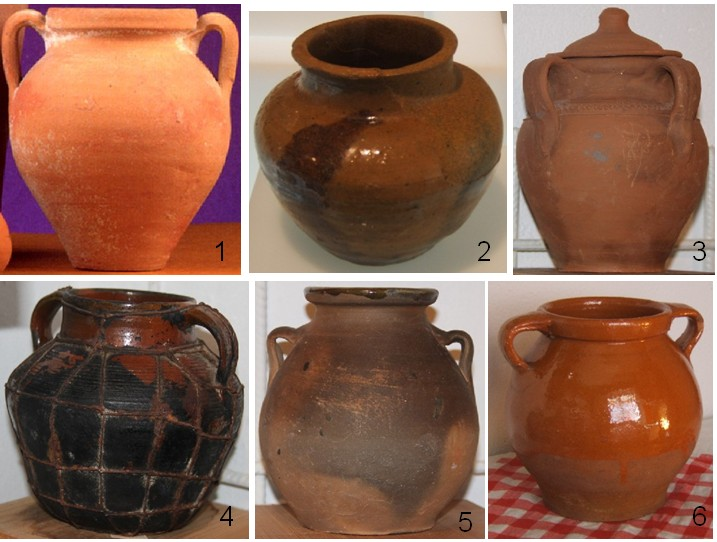
Various orzas. Orzas were usually made with the same paste as ''botijas, making it difficult to assign many sherds to a particular style of container.

Olive jars found on shipwrecks of known date help establish a time line for changes in styles. Botijas were important shipping containers in the Spanish Empire, but were also used in wider trade networks. They have been found in the British Isles, Brittany, the Netherlands, Poland, Sweden, Caribbean Islands, Mexico, Colombia, Ecuador, Argentina, Canada, the Philippines, Australia, the Solomon Islands, English settlements in North and South Carolina, and at the site of a Native American camp in Nebraska.

Olive jars probably were used extensively by the Spanish for travel by land or small water vessels, carrying wine, olive oil, and water. The presence of olive jar sherds at archaeological sites are a good indicator of Spanish presence that lasted long enough for one or more jars to break. On the other hand, the absence of such sherds at archaeological sites that do have other artifacts of Spanish provenance, which may have arrived through trade or as plunder, may indicate that there was no Spanish presence at the site.

== Sources ==
- Beaman, Thomas E., Jr.; Mintz, John J. (Summer 1998). "Iberian Olive Jars at Brunswick Town and Other British Colonial Sites: Three Models for Consideration". Southeastern Archaeology. 17 (1): 92–102. JSTOR 41890392.
- Busto-Zapico, Miguel (2020). "Standardization and units of measurement used in pottery production: the case of the post-medieval botijuella or Spanish olive jat made in Seville". Post-Medieval Archaeology. 54 (1): 42–59. doi:10.1080/00794236.2020.1750145.
- Carruthers, Clive (2003). "Spanish Botijas or Olive Jars from the Santo Domingo Monastery, La Antigua Guatemala". Historical Archaeology. 37 (4): 40–45. doi:10.1007/BF03376622.
- Hill, David V.; Bozell, John R.; Carlson, Gayle F. (2015). "Olive Jar Ceramics from the Eagle Ridge Site (25sy116) in Eastern Nebraska: Booty from the Villasur Expedition?". Journal of Southwestern Anthropology and History. 80 (3–4): 409–418. doi:10.1080/00231940.2016.1151154.
- James, Stephen R., Jr. (1988). "A reassessment of the Chronological and Typological Framework of the Spanish Olive Jar". Historical Archaeology. 22: 44–66. doi:10.1007/BF03374500 – via Springer Link.
- Worth, John E. (2023). "Spanish Olive Jar and other shipping containers of sixteenth-century Florida: quantifying the documentary record". Southeastern Archaeology. 42 (4): 252–271. doi:10.1080/0734578X.2023.2240600.
