= Henrietta Marie =

British slave ship

History

France
- Fate: Captured by English in War of the Grand Alliance.

England
- Port of registry: London
- Fate: Sank in 1700; discovered by magnetometer survey in 1972

General characteristics
- Class & type: Slave ship
- Tons burthen: 120 (bm)
- Length: 60 to 80 feet (18 to 24 m)

The Henrietta Marie was a slave ship that carried captive Africans to the West Indies, where they were sold as slaves. The ship wrecked at the southern tip of Florida on its way home to England, and is one of only a few wrecks of slave ships that have been identified.

== History ==
The Henrietta Marie carried a crew of about eighteen men. It was probably built in France sometime in the 17th century. The ship came into English possession late in the 17th century, possibly as a war prize during the War of the Grand Alliance. It was put to use in the Atlantic slave trade, making at least two voyages carrying Africans to slavery in the West Indies. On its first voyage, in 1697–1698, the ship carried more than 200 people from Africa that were sold as slaves in Barbados. The ship was owned by a consortium of investors, including Thomas Starke, "an experienced slave trader who was part owner of several other slaving vessels and owned five tobacco plantations in Virginia,

In 1699 the Henrietta Marie sailed from England on the first leg of the triangular trade route with a load of trade goods, including iron and copper bars, pewter utensils, glass beads, cloth and brandy. The ship sailed under license from the Royal African Company (which held a monopoly on English trade with Africa), in exchange for ten percent of the profits of the voyage. It is known to have traded for African captives at New Calabar on the Guinea Coast. The ship then sailed on the second leg of its voyage, from Africa to the West Indies, and in May 1700 landed 191 Africans for sale in Port Royal, Jamaica. The Henrietta Marie then loaded a cargo of sugar, cotton, dyewoods and ginger to take back to England on the third leg of the triangular route. After leaving Port Royal the ship headed for the Yucatán Channel to pass around the western end of Cuba (thus avoiding the pirates infesting the passage between Cuba and Hispaniola) and catch the Gulf Stream, the preferred route for all ships leaving the Caribbean to return to Europe. The Henrietta Marie wrecked on New Ground Reef near the Marquesas Keys, approximately 35 miles (56 km) west of Key West. There were no survivors, and the fate of the ship remained unknown for almost three centuries.

== Discovery and salvage ==
The wreck was found in 1972 during a magnetometer survey by a boat operated by a subsidiary of Mel Fisher's Treasure Salvors, Inc. (Fisher's company was searching for the Nuestra Señora de Atocha and other ships of the 1622 Spanish treasure fleet that had wrecked along the Florida Keys in a hurricane.) Two anchors and a cannon were found on the first visit. The wreck was visited again in 1973. Some artifacts were collected from the wreck, including bilboes, iron shackles that were used to restrain slaves. When they realized that the wreck was likely a slave ship, not a treasure ship, the company reburied the artifacts and pieces of the ship's hull that they had exposed and left the site. In 1983 through 1985 Henry Taylor, sub-contracting with Mel Fisher's company, excavated the wreck (known as the English wreck) with the assistance of archaeologist David Moore. The wreck was identified when a bronze ship's bell carrying the inscription The Henrietta Marie 1699 was found at the wreck site. Survey and excavation of the wreck site has continued at intervals.

The Henrietta Marie wreck has yielded more than 7000 objects (and more than 30,000 glass beads), the largest collection of artifacts known from a slave ship. They have contributed greatly to our understanding of slave ships and the slave trade. Parts making up more than 80 bilboes have been found at the wreck site. As bilboes were typically used to shackle pairs of slaves together, the ones found at the wreck site could have restrained more than 160 slaves. Other items found at the wreck site include trade goods apparently left over from trading for captives in Africa, goods acquired in Africa in addition to captives (including an elephant tusk), and gear belonging to the ship and crew. Part of the hull of the ship, including much of the keel and part of the stern post, have survived, and have been measured and reburied at the site.

Two copper cauldrons found at the wreck site shed light on the diet of the crew and slaves on a voyage. Malcom argues that the cauldrons were used to prepare separate meals for the crew and the slaves. One cauldron had a single chamber one-half cubic yard (0.38 m^{3}) in capacity. This vessel was probably used to prepare a sort of mush or gruel for the slaves. As there were no slaves on the ship at the time it wrecked, the cauldron had been used to store chain. The second cauldron was smaller and had two chambers. One chamber had a capacity of one cubic foot (0.028 m^{3}), and the second a capacity of one-half cubic foot (0.014 m^{3}). This vessel could have been used to cook a two-course meal for the crew.

== Legacy ==
In May 1993, the National Association of Black Scuba Divers placed a memorial plaque on the site of the Henrietta Marie. The plaque faces the African shore thousands of miles away, and has the name of the slave ship and reads, “In memory and recognition of the courage, pain and suffering of enslaved African people. Speak her name and gently touch the souls of our ancestors." Dr. Colin Palmer stated, "the story ends in 1700 for this particular ship, but the story of what the ship represented continues today," he says. "The importance of the Henrietta Marie is that she is an essential part of recovering the black experience - symbolically, metaphorically and in reality".

A 1995 documentary, Slave Ship: The Testimony of the Henrietta Marie, was narrated by Cornel West.

The vessel was also featured on the History Channel's Deep Sea Detectives.

An exhibition, "A Slave Ship Speaks: the Wreck of the Henrietta Marie", was created by the Mel Fisher Maritime Museum in 1995, and toured museums around the United States for more than a decade. In November 2024, "A Slave Ship Speaks: The Wreck of the Henrietta Marie", opened as a permanent exhibit at the Mel Fisher Maritime Museum.

A new exhibition, Spirits of the Passage, including a great number of artifacts from the Henrietta Marie began touring North America in 2019. The exhibit is now housed at the Mel Fisher Maritime Museum.

The Mel Fisher Maritime Museum has also launched the Florida Slave Trade Center. A database and online exhibition featuring all of the artifacts from this ship wreck and a descriptive online exhibition and including other artifacts and documents from the museum's slave trade collection.
