= Curious Punishments of Bygone Days =

1896 book by Alice Morse Earle

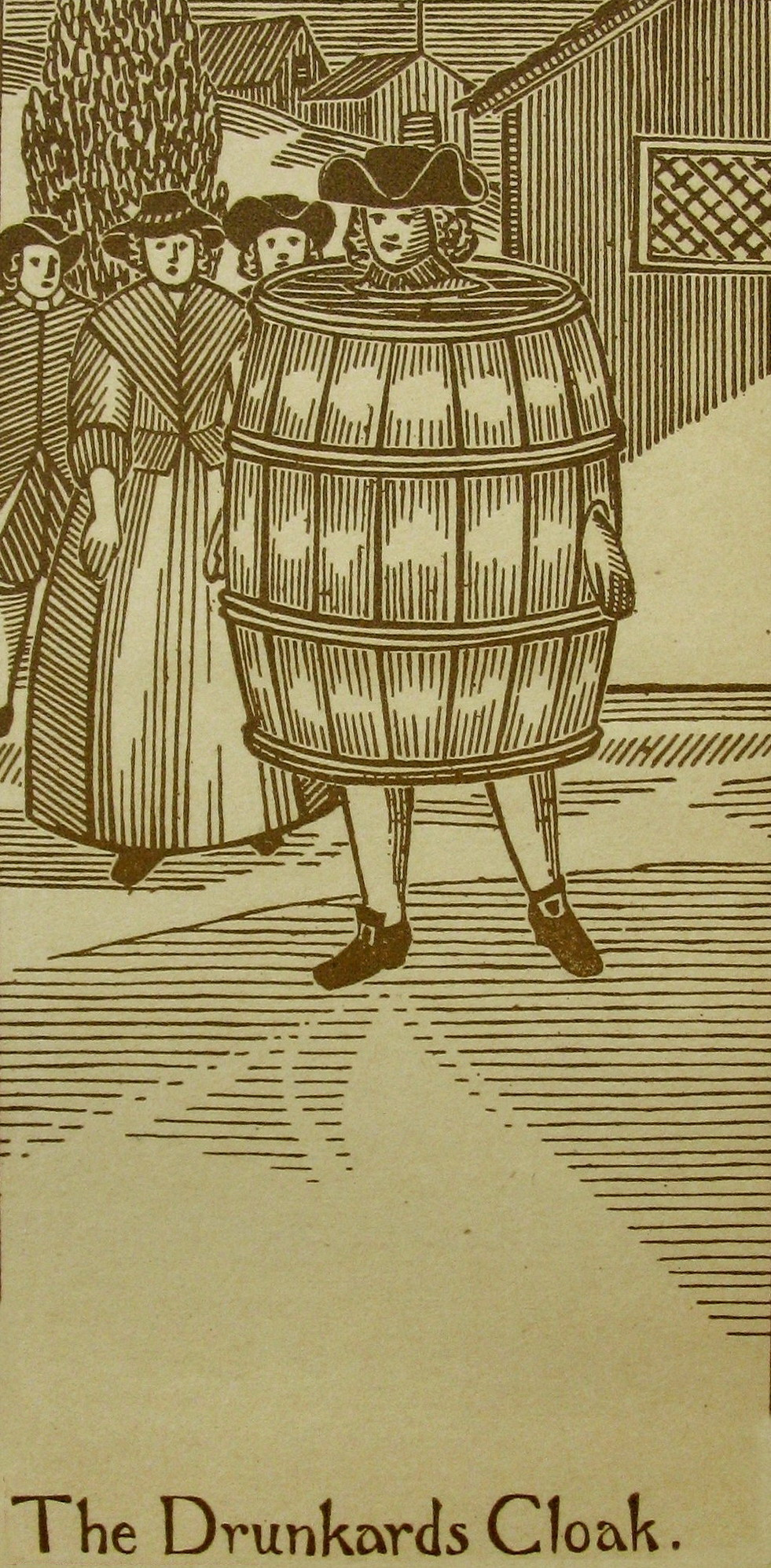
"The Drunkard's Cloak" - an illustration from Curious Punishments of Bygone Days

Curious Punishments of Bygone Days is a history book published in 1896. It was written by Alice Morse Earle and printed by Herbert S. Stone & Company. Earle was a historian of Colonial America, and she writes in her introduction:

In ransacking old court records, newspapers, diaries and letters for the historic foundation of the books which I have written on colonial history, I have found and noted much of interest that has not been used or referred to in any of those books. An accumulation of notes on old-time laws, punishments and penalties has evoked this volume.

As the title suggests, the subject of the chapters is various archaic punishments. Morse seems to make a distinction between stocks for the feet, in the Stocks chapter, and stocks for the head, described in the Pillory article- which itself clashes with the modern day understanding of a pillory as a whipping post.

== Table of contents ==
- Foreword
- The Bilboes
- The Ducking Stool
- The Stocks
- The Pillory
- Punishments of Authors and Books
- The Whipping Post
- The Scarlet Letter
- Branks and Gags
- Public Penance
- Military Punishments
- Branding and Maiming
