= Alice Clary Earle Hyde =

American botanical illustrator and conservationist

- Born: Alice Clary Earle; 1876; Brooklyn, New York
- Died: January 17, 1943 (aged 66–67); Waterbury, Connecticut
- Occupation: Botanical artist

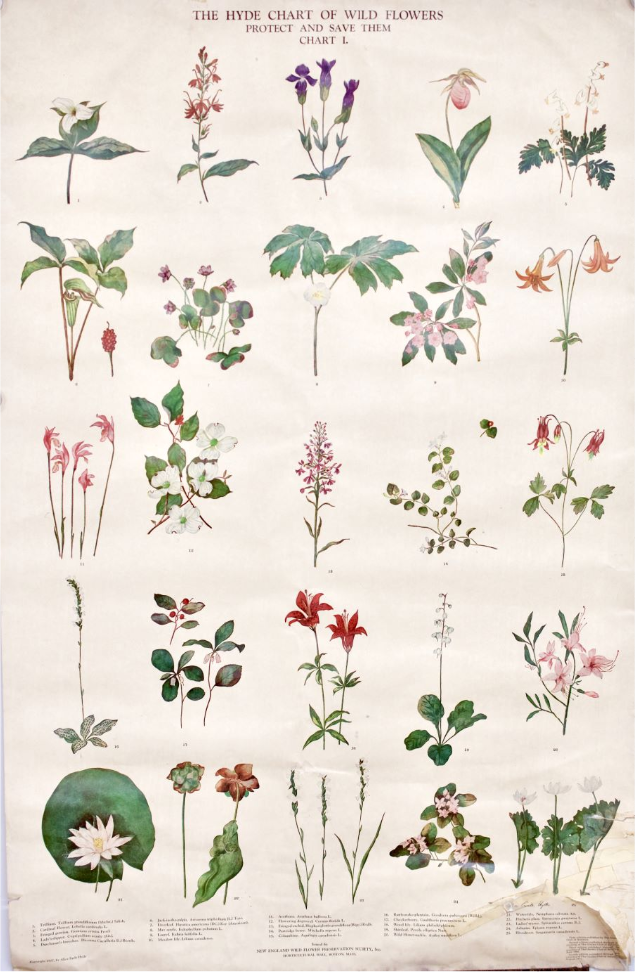
Alice Earle Hyde - Chart of Wild Flowers

Alice Clary Earle Hyde (1876 – January 17, 1943) was an American botanical artist and conservationist.

== Biography ==
Hyde née Earle was born in 1876 in Brooklyn, New York. She was the daughter of Henry Earle and the author Alice Morse Earle.

Hyde contributed to A guide to the wild flowers east of the Mississippi and north of Virginia, published in 1928. In 1936 Hyde organized an exhibit of Colonial Folk Arts and Customs Pertaining to Plants for the "National Committee on Folk Arts in the United States". In 1943 she contributed Spooky The Story of a Remarkable Ovenbird to the "Bulletin of North Carolina Bird Club" (now the Carolina Bird Club).

Hyde was the illustrator for an edition of Webster's Dictionary. She was a member of the New England Wildflower Society and served as vice president.

Hyde died on January 17, 1943, in Waterbury, Connecticut.
