= Mel Fisher Maritime Heritage Museum =

Museum in Key West, Florida

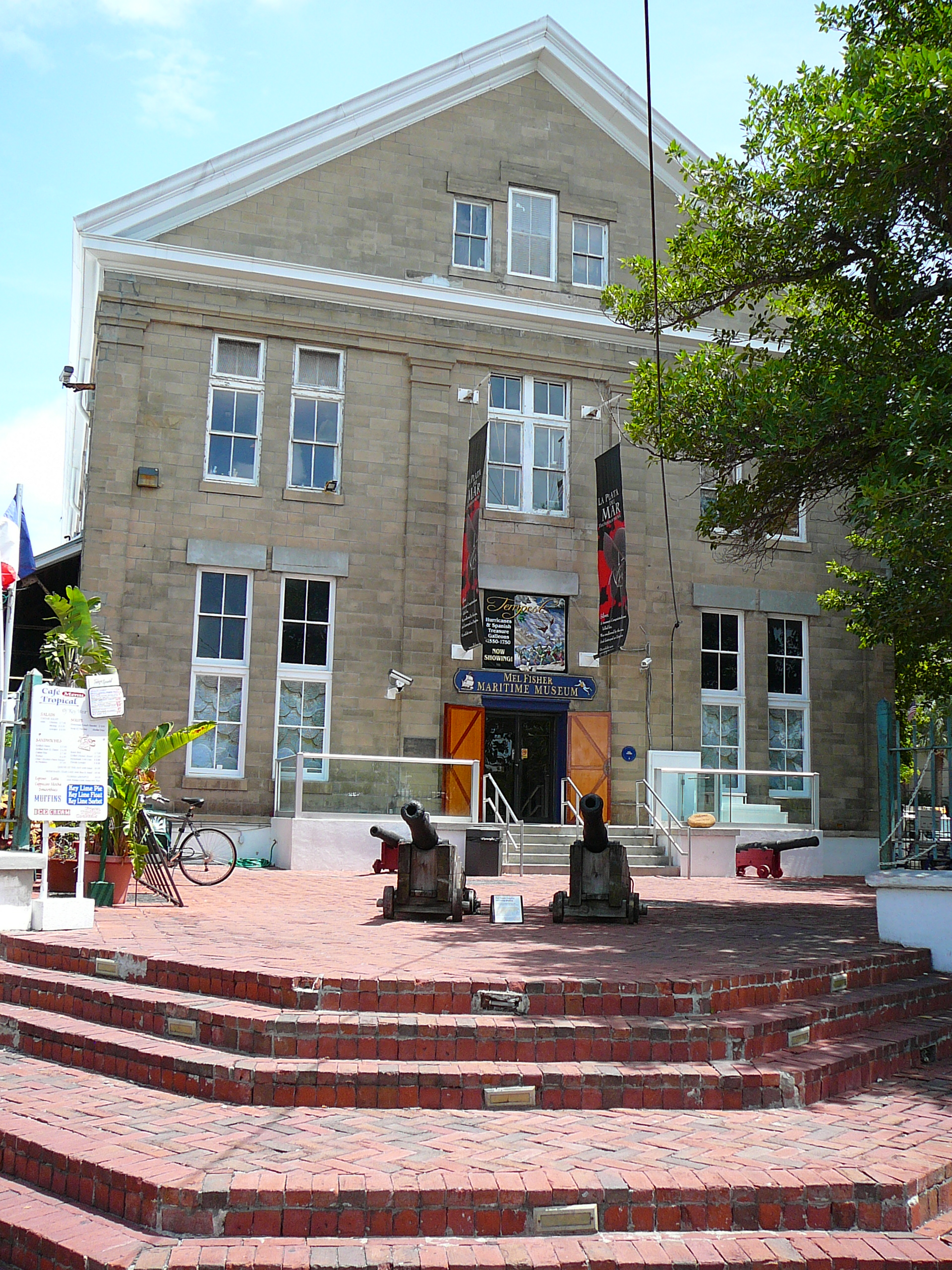

- Location within Florida
- Location: 200 Greene Street; Key West, Florida
- Coordinates: 24.557965°N 81.806495°W
- Type: Maritime Archaeology
- Website: Mel Fisher Maritime Heritage Museum

The Mel Fisher Maritime Museum is located at 200 Greene Street, Key West, Florida. The museum contains an extensive collection of artifacts from 17th century shipwrecks, such as the Henrietta Marie, Nuestra Señora de Atocha and Santa Margarita. Also included are the shipwrecks and artifacts of The Santa Clara, a Conquistador-era galleon (1564), The Guerrero & Nimble. A rotating gallery exists on the second floor of the museum and is currently displaying an exhibit or artifacts belonging to Cuban Rafters, Balseros, who arrive to Key West in hand-crafted vessels. Terrestrial archaeological sites include The African Cemetery of Key West, located on Higgs Beach. The museum is named for founder Mel Fisher and was created as a 501(c)3 non-profit charity organization, thus Fisher's fortune is not financially linked to the museum. It is a museum, a lab, and a nationally recognized research facility.

Within the museum is a fully operating Conservation and Archaeology lab, where guests are allowed admittance during a daily private Lab Tour and are able to touch the artifacts while learning about the various stages of artifact conservation. Some artifacts, depending on type and density, can take anywhere from weeks to years for full conservation before they are placed on display in the museum.

As of December 2015, the upstairs exhibits, in addition to the slave ship Henrietta Marie, included displays about a group of freed slaves in Key West in 1860, the preservation of items recovered underwater, and Caribbean piracy.

== Gold Bar Theft ==
A popular tourist feature was a solid gold bar that could be lifted by visitors in a plexiglass case. This bar was stolen by two thieves, Richard Johnson and Jarred Goldman, in August 2010. Following the theft, the gold bar was then cut into pieces and sold off in Las Vegas. In 2018, the FBI arrested the two men after receiving an anonymous tip. Only a single piece of the gold bar was able to be recovered. Johnson was sentenced to 5 years and 3 months in prison with Goldman receiving 3 years and 4 months. Both men also had to pay $570,195 in compensation.

== See also ==
- List of maritime museums in the United States
