= Botija (container) =

Ceramic shipping container of the Spanish Empire

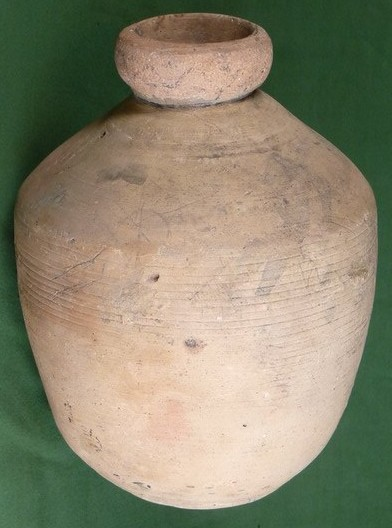
Botija perulera from Seville, 17th century

Botija is a term used by archaeologists for a style of ceramic vessel produced in Seville, Spain from early in the 16th-century through the middle of the 19th century. It was radially symmetrical, widest near the top, tapering down to a rounded or nearly pointed bottom. It had a fairly small mouth, and did not have any handles or protusions. While the measurements of individual botijas vary, they tend to cluster around roughly standard sizes. They were sealed with cork stoppers. Botijas were widely used for shipping and storing liquids and some solids, and whole or broken botijas are found almost everywhere the Spanish Empire reached, as well as areas that the Spanish never controlled. Changes to certain elements of botijas over time, documented from jars found in shipwrecks of known date, allow whole jars and sherds found in archaeological sites to be roughly dated.

== Names ==
Spanish records refer to botijas peruleras, botijas medias, botijuelas, botijuelas peruleras, and botixuelas. In colonial Guatemala, the terms botija de vino (wine), botija da aceite (oil), and botija de aceitunas (olives) are attested. Larger jars were commonly called botijas perulera or just peruleras, while the smaller ones were often called botijuellas. Perulera may derive from "Peru" or from the perula, a glazed pitcher. (Perulera was also used for boxes, crates, and bundles.) The term botijuella was not used consistently. It might have sometimes been used for larger jars, but when used in the same context with botija, it always meant the smaller jar.

American archaeologists have generally called bojitas found at archaeological sites "olive jars" or "Spanish olive jars". Archaeologists have been inconsistent in use of "olive jar", varying between "olive jar" as a name for all Spanish ceramics, and as name for the most common type, the botija. Other types of Spanish ceramics that are sometimes called "olive jars", and sometimes "Spanish storage jars", include the cantimplora, tinaja, and orza. American archaeologists recognize that olive jars were used to transport and store many products other than olives, but the term is in wide-spread use, and not easily replaced.

== Form ==
Botijas were widest near the top with a rounded to pointed bottom and a narrow neck, resembling amphorae, from which they are believed to have been derived. Botijas are a continuation of classic Mediterranean traditions. Another theory is that Botijas evolved out of the dolium, an ancient storage vessel, in the first half of the 16th century. (Dolia were used in the construction of the Seville Cathedral, in the way botijas were later used in construction.) Most of Europe used wooden casks for storing and transporting goods while Spain continued to also use ceramic jars, probably because it lacked sufficient supplies of timber suitable for making large quantities of casks.

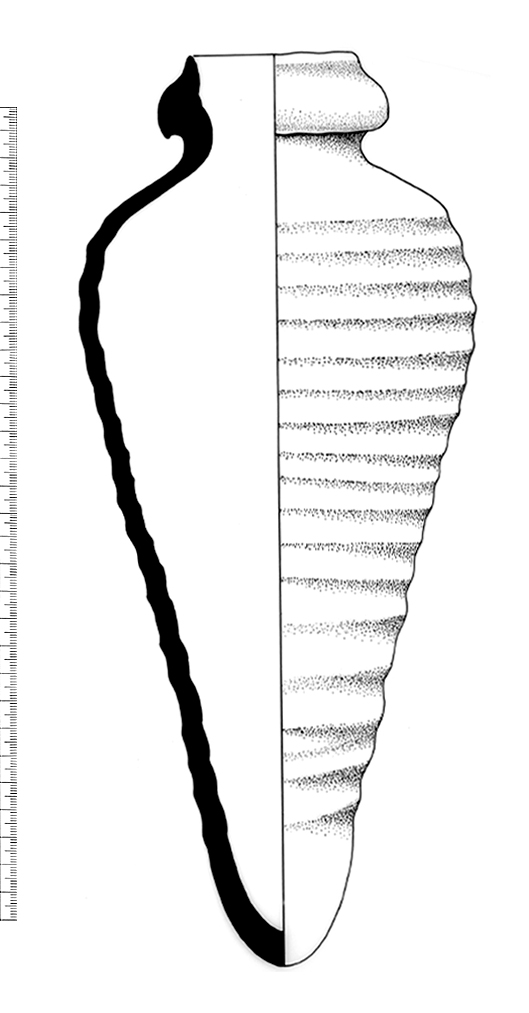
Carrot-shaped "olive jar" (botija) found on the Isle of Wight

Many botijas were egg-shaped, while others were globular, carrot-shaped, or had long, more or less tubular bottoms. Rims around the mouths of early botijas were thin, but in the 1560s to the 1580s the rims became thicker, with a "donut" shape. Rim forms changed gradually from a triangular cross-section in the late-16th and early 17th centuries to more rounded in the mid-17th century to very rounded with a protruding lip by the early 18th century. Those changes can help date archaeological sites, although not precisely.

== Sealing ==
The small size of mouths of botijas allowed them to be closed with cork stoppers. Cork has been found associated with jars. Jar rims found in the wrecks of the Santa Margarita and Nuestra Senora de Atocha still had cork stoppers in place, including two that had pitch attaching the cork to the rim. Many of the jars found in the Conde de Tolosa and Neustra Senora de Guadalupe, which wrecked in Samana Bay in 1774, had corks inside them, even if the jars were otherwise empty. One jar from those wrecks, containing pitch, had a thin piece of leather placed over the opening with a cork stopper inserted over it, so that the leather may have acted as a gasket. Other ways of sealing jars are known. Discs of flattened, unglazed clay were found with jars at the Fortress of Louisbourg, and a jar dredged from the River Rance in Brittany contained two ceramic stoppers, both with tapered sides, one of which had a handle.

== Classification ==
=== Goggin ===
John Mann Goggin created a typology in the mid-20th century for the ceramic containers found at archaeological sites associated with Spanish presence which are commonly called "olive jars" or "Spanish olive jars". He recognized Early, Middle, and Late styles based primarily on the stratigraphic sequence of styles and of the paste used in jars found at several archaeological sites. While all three of Goggin's styles were made with very similar pastes, the Early Style differed considerably from the later styles, being round in profile and somewhat flattened in cross section, and having two handles at the top. Goggin's Early Style is now recognized as the cantimplora. The cantimplora was not used past the 16th-century for shipping to the Americas. Goggin's Middle and Late styles are botijas, which appeared early in the 16th-century, overlapping with the cantimplora.

Goggin recognized three forms in the Middle Style, and four forms in the Late Style. Form A is egg shaped, long, tapering slowly from the widest point just below the rim to a rounded bottom. Form B is nearly globular. Form C is widest further below the rim than form A, and tapers down to a narrower bottom than form A. Form C is rare, and documented only from Santo Domingo. Form D, known only from the Late Style, is widest somewhat below the rim, tapers in quickly, and has a long narrow, tubular bottom.

=== James ===
In 1988, Stephen James described more than 1,000 intact ceramic jars recovered from two ships, the Conde de Tolosa and Neustra Senora de Guadalupe, which sank in 1724 in Samana Bay on the north coast of Hispaniola after sailing from Cádiz, Spain. He recognized four forms among the intact jars. They were variously unglazed, glazed only on the interior, or glazed on the interior and exterior. Intact jars from the wrecks were measured, including the volume of water held for jars with interior glazing. Interior glazing is believed to indicate the jar was intended to hold liquids that could be readily absorbed by unglazed ceramics. Sherds from broken jars were examined for paste composition, and were found similar enough to suggest that all of the jars were made from the same source of clay.

Form I jars from the wrecks are egg-shaped and the largest found in the shipwrecks, ranging from 47 to 52 cm in height, 29.3 to 32.8 cm diameter at the widest part, and 15 to 20.1 liters in volume. They correspond to Goggin's Middle Style Shape A. Most of the jars have an empty weight of 8.5 to 9.5 kg. The jars have openings or mouths with an external diameter between 10 and 10.2 cm and a somewhat flattened rim with a lip. About 66% of these large jars were glazed on the interior, or on both the interior and the exterior.

Form II jars are about half the height of Form I, and resemble Goggin's Middle Style shape B, globular in shape, with a conical shoulder meeting the body of the jar at an angle. The Form II jars range from 23.5 to 29.5 cm in height, are 22 to 27 mm in width, and range from 3.3 to 7.2 litres in volume. Almost 85% of the Form II jars are glazed on the interior or both the interior and exterior. The openings vary in size, and, unlike the other forms, do not have lips on the rim.

Form IV jars are "carrot-shaped", with a rounded top and a long body tapering to a point. The sides of the body are either straight or incurved. These jars are also relatively rare, making up 2.2% of the jars found in the wrecks. They are 36 to 45 cm tall, with a maximum diameter of 18.2 to 19.2 cm, and a Volume of 3.01 to 3.8 litres. None of these jars were glazed. Two of the Form IV jars contained olive pits.

Form III jars have a concave bottom, which allows them to sit upright on a level surface, unlike the other jars discussed. There were only 11 of the Form III jars out of the more than 1,000 intect jars in the collection. Form I, III, and IV jars all have lipped rims, and probably all took the same type of cork stopper.

=== Escribano and Mederos ===
G. Escribano Cobo and A. Mederos Martín published a classification in 1999, recognizing four types, Botijuela Type A (1475–1800), Botijuela Type B (1550-1800), Botijuela Type C, (1600–1725), and Botijuela Type D (1775–1850).

=== Busto-Zapico ===
In a paper published in 2020, Miguel Busto-Zapico analysed 40 jars found in Spain, all made in Seville. He described four types of botijas: C1, a compact jar with a circular profile, similar to Escribano and Mederos's Botijuela Type B, which held an average capacity of about six litres; C2, a jar of small size and capacity with a thin lower body, similar to Escribano and Mederos's Botijuela Type D, with a capacity of 1.3 litres; C3, of large size and capacity, tending to piriform (wide top, reduced waist, "pear-shaped"), similar to Escribano and Mederos's Botijuela Type C, with a capacity of 22.5 litres; and C4, with a capacity of 37 litres, similar to Escribano and Mederos's Botijuela Type A. He proposed that C1 jars were used for both liquids and solids, C2 jars were probably used primarily for wine, C3 may have been used for either wine or oil, while C4 may have been restricted to transporting oil.

== Production ==
The production of botijas was concentrated in Andalusia, with Seville being the most important center of ceramic production in the Iberian Peninsula during the Early modern period. The Casa de Contratación de Indias (the institution that controlled trade with the New World) was established in Seville in 1503, where it remained until it was transferred to Cádiz in 1717. The need for ceramic containers to hold merchandise sent to the New World led to development of potters' neighborhoods in Seville and Cádiz. Ceramic containers similar to botijas were produced in Portuguese centers such as Aveiro and in Spanish possessions in the Americas, but did not necessarily match the standards of jars produced in Seville. Colin Martin suggested that there were "official" and "civilian" botijas, with the official jars being Goggin's Form B (globular) in two sizes, while civilian jars varied considerable in shape.

The jars were thrown in two parts. The body of the jars from the base up to the widest part was thrown as one part, and the top was thrown as another. The two parts were then joined with a slip while being turned on a wheel. Busto-Zapico surmises that the potter throwing the base did not throw the top and did not know what the final size of the jars would be. Production of botijas was probably seasonal, with individual potters producing about 6,000 jars a year. New large bojitas cost just under one Spanish real in the 16th century, the price of a liter of olive oil, almost two pounds of meat or fish, or more than four pounds of corn.

Some jars with a distinctive red paste and a different style of rim marks may have been produced in Cazalla de la Sierra, 75 km north-northeast of Seville. Cazalla was an important wine-producing area, and botijas of wine from Cazalla were listed on several manifests of shipments to the New World. Such jars have been found at the Santo Domingo Monastery in Antigua Guatemala, the Huaco Palomin site in Peru, and Santa Elena (in South Carolina), in wrecks of ships in the Spanish Armada of 1588 and, possibly, in the Nuestra Señora de Atocha wreck in the Florida Keys.

== Sizes ==
Botijas of all styles varied in all dimensions, indicating that the jars were thrown free-hand without the use of a template. Jar sizes tend to cluster around small fractions or multiples of traditional Spanish measures, which may indicate that potters used some sort of device like a rope or a piece of wood to roughly gauge the size of the jars. The jars predominantly were made in two sizes, one arroba or a bit more, and one-half arroba or more.

In the 16th century, large botijas were at least one arroba, and commonly about 1 1/4 arrobas. By early in the 17th century a 1 1/4 arrobas jar was described as "ordinary" compared to a "large" jar of 1 1/2 arrobas. The half-arroba jars were based on an oil arroba, used to measure olive oil because it is less dense than water (and wine and vinegar). A water arroba weighed 34 Spanish libras, while an oil arroba weighed 25 Spanish libras. An oil arroba held 79% of the volume of a water arroba. Traditional units of measure in Spain during the period varied between regions, but a 1 1/4 (water) arroba jar held about 20 litres of wine or water.

An oil arroba was just over 12.5 litres, so that a half-arroba jar held close to 6.3 litres of oil, 31% of the capacity of a 1 1/4 arroba jar. A detailed inventory of jars of pork lard stored at St Augustine in 1599 noted that each perulera (large jar) held as much lard as three of the botijuellas (small jars). While jars of other sizes are occasionally listed in records, the large jars of about 1 1/4 water arrobas and small jars of 1/2 oil arrobas predominated in ceramic vessels.

When production of botijas began in America in the late 16th century, the walls of the jars were frequently much thicker than the ones from Spain, so that an American-made jar full of wine or oil might weight as much as a Spanish-made one, but contain less wine or oil. Authorities in Chile instituted fines on potters who consistently produced under-capacity botijas.

== Rim marks ==
Rim marks have been found on Goggin's Middle Style jars, but not Early or Late style jars. The marks appear to represent the merchant shipping the jars or the intended recipient of the jar. Some ship manifests have been found on which the merchant or purchaser and the mark on the jars are listed. Most marks were applied before the jars were fired, usually with a device like a branding iron, leaving an indented mark, or, in a few cases, a raised mark produced by a stamp with an indented design. Some marks were made free-hand with a pointed instrument. A few jars were marked after firing by scratching or filing a design on the rim. Rim shapes and marks can be used for approximately dating jars. No marked rims have been reliably dated to before 1583 or after 1641.

== Uses ==
Botijas were used to store, conserve, and transport solid and liquid goods. The botija was designed for liquid foods, and was used primarily for shipping wine, olive oil, and vinegar. Botijas were also used for solid items that would fit through the mouth of the jar. The ovoid to elongated top-heavy design of botijas, with pointed or rounded bottoms, is evidence they were not intended for long-term storage of liquids while sitting on the ground. Vessels with flat bottoms and wider mouths, such as tinajas and orzas were more suitable for storing liquids. Orzas were usually made with the same paste as ''botijas, making it difficult to assign many sherds to a particular style of container.

Worth suggests that botijas intended for oil were lead-glazed to prevent the oil being absorbed by the walls of the botijas and becoming rancid. Botijas carrying wine were lined with pez (colofonia), a resin which sealed the ceramic from the wine. Pez could be removed and reapplied to the interior of botijas as needed. Spices and herbs could be added to the pez to help disguise the taste of the pez, and the botijas were rinsed with vinegar and water to remove some of taste before wine was added to the botijas.

Warehouse records from the early 1590s in St. Augustine show botijas were used to store olive oil, wine, vinegar, and turpentine. Botijas sometimes also held almonds, capers, honey, medicinals, lard, hazelnuts, and syrup, with one botija of salt pork reported in the early 17th century in St. Augustine. Botijas were often re-used. Empty botijas and other containers were given to members of the presidio garrison and other residents in St. Augustine for their personal use.

Botijas were also used to fill in domes over large spaces for acoustic enhancement, incorporated into roof vaults, walls, and gate arches, in drainage structures, and as finials on granaries, the last particularly in Asturias, Galicia, and Santiago de Cuba. Sherds were used as roof tiles and pavers.

== Transportation ==
In the Spanish Empire, goods were shipped in crates, barrels, bundles, baskets, and other containers, but ceramic jars were usually the most numerous containers used for shipping. Botijas were wrapped with wicker or matting, which cushioned the jars and gave a means of handing the jars with attached handles of rope. They could be transported on land in carts, on horses, or by human porters. Botijas could be stacked to fit into irregular spaces in the holds of ships. Olive jars on the Conde de Tolosa and Neustra Senora de Guadalupe were often found chocked with wood, variously described as tree branches and firewood. Olive jars were often stacked in tiers, with large jars below and small jars above. Large jars on the bottom were often resting on hempline, while smaller jars were found resting on straw or plant matter, with hempline separating them.

In the 16th-century the most common shipping containers on Spanish ships were botijas, but other types of containers generally had larger capacities than did botijas. For instance, most wine was transported in pipas (a wooden cask equivalent to the English pipe), which held 480 litres, equivalent to 22 large botijas. One ship that sailed in 1557 carried almost 3,500 botijas. In 1567, a ship passing through Havana to Florida carried 2,939 half-arroba jars of olive oil.

Lists of contents of botijas shipped from Seville to the New World included wine, olive oil, olives, vinegar, chickpeas, capers, beans, honey, fish, rice, flour, soap, and pitch. Botijas have been found in shipwrecks that still contained olive pits, pitch, and soap. Based on records for seven ships that sailed in the 16th century, 51% of botijas held wine, 38% held olive oil, 9% held olives, 1% held vinegar, and 1% held other goods. Wine was primarily shipped in pipas, while olive oil was primarily shipped in botijas. Olives were mostly shipped in barrels, while vinegar was always shipped in botijas. Empty botijas were also shipped from Spain to the colonies. One ship carried 1,659 empty botijas to Honduras in 1557. The Tristán de Luna expedition acquired almost 1,000 empty botijas in Veracruz in 1559 while provisioning for the expedition to Ochuse.

== Sources ==
- Beaman, Thomas E., Jr.; Mintz, John J. (Summer 1998). "Iberian Olive Jars at Brunswick Town and Other British Colonial Sites: Three Models for Consideration". Southeastern Archaeology. 17 (1): 92–102. JSTOR 41890392.
- Busto-Zapico, Miguel (2020). "Standardization and units of measurement used in pottery production: the case of the post-medieval botijuella or Spanish olive jat made in Seville". Post-Medieval Archaeology. 54 (1): 42–59. doi:10.1080/00794236.2020.1750145.
- Carruthers, Clive (2003). "Spanish Botijas or Olive Jars from the Santo Domingo Monastery, La Antigua Guatemala". Historical Archaeology. 37 (4): 40–45. doi:10.1007/BF03376622.
- James, Stephen R., Jr. (1988). "A reassessment of the Chronological and Typological Framework of the Spanish Olive Jar". Historical Archaeology. 22 (1): 44–66. doi:10.1007/BF03374500 – via Springer Link.
- Worth, John E. (2023). "Spanish Olive Jar and other shipping containers of sixteenth-century Florida: quantifying the documentary record". Southeastern Archaeology. 42 (4): 252–271. doi:10.1080/0734578X.2023.2240600.
