= Alice Morse Earle =

American historian (1851–1911)

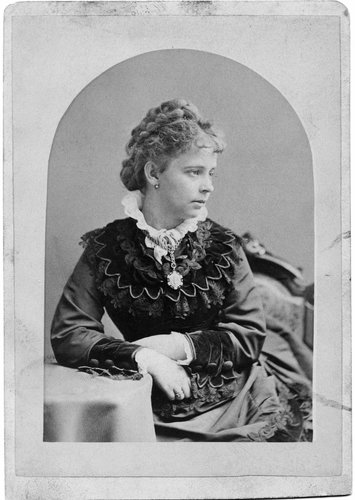
- Alice Morse in 1873
- Born: Mary Alice Morse; April 27, 1851; Worcester, Massachusetts
- Died: February 16, 1911 (aged 59); Hempstead, Long Island
- Occupations: Historian and author
- Spouse: Henry Earle (m. 1874)

Alice Morse Earle (April 27, 1851 – February 16, 1911) was an American historian and writer from Worcester, Massachusetts.

She was christened Mary Alice by her parents Edwin Morse and Abby Mason Clary. On April 15, 1874, she married Henry Earle of New York City with whom she had four children, including the botanical illustrator Alice Clary Earle Hyde. She changed her name from Mary Alice Morse to Alice Morse Earle. Her writings, beginning in 1890, focused on daily colonial life rather than grand events, and thus are invaluable for modern US social historians. She wrote a number of books on colonial America (and especially the New England region) such as Home Life in Colonial Days, Old Time Gardens, Costume of Colonial Times, and Curious Punishments of Bygone Days.

She was a passenger aboard the RMS Republic when, while in a dense fog, that ship collided with the SS Florida. During the transfer of passengers, Alice fell into the water. Her near drowning in 1909 off the coast of Nantucket during this abortive trip to Egypt weakened her health sufficiently that she died two years later, in Hempstead, Long Island.

== Partial list of publications ==
- The Sabbath in Puritan New England (1891)
- China Collecting in America (1892)
- Customs and Fashions in Old New England (1893)
- Diary of Anna Green Winslow, A Boston School Girl of 1771 (1894)
- Costume of Colonial Times (1894)
- Colonial Dames and Goodwives (1895)
- Margaret Winthrop (1895)
- Colonial Days in Old New York (1896)
- Curious Punishments of Bygone Days (1896)
- In Old Narragansett: Romances and Realities (1898)
- Home Life in Colonial Days (1898)
- Child Life in Colonial Days (1899)
- Stagecoach and Tavern Days at www.quinnipiac.edu Stagecoach and Tavern Days (1900) or at Internet Archive
- Old Time Gardens (1901)
- Sun Dials and Roses of Yesterday (1902)
- Two Centuries of Costume in America, 1620–1820 (2 vols., 1903)
