= Mel Fisher's Treasure Museum =

Florida museum

Mel Fisher’s Treasure Museum
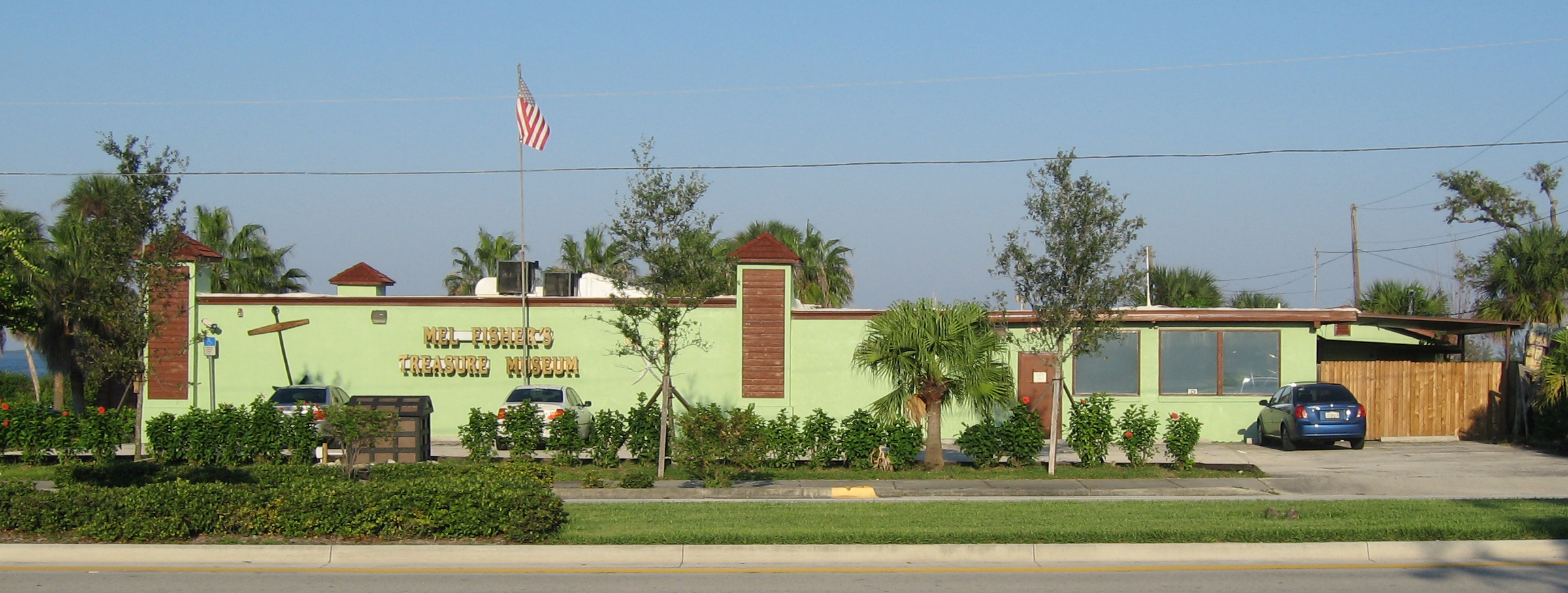

- Location within Florida
- Established: December 1992
- Location: 1322 U.S. Highway 1 Sebastian, Florida
- Coordinates: 27.8185°N 80.4695°W
- Type: Maritime Archaeology
- Website: http://www.melfisher.com/

Mel Fisher's Treasure Museum is located at 1322 U.S. Highway 1, Sebastian, Florida. It houses exhibits on archaeology and the 1715 Spanish treasure fleet. Taffi Fisher, Mel Fisher’s daughter, opened the museum in December 1992 in an old abandoned fire station after renovating the building. The museum included a working conservation laboratory used to preserve artifacts recovered from underwater with an observation window for viewing conservation work from inside the museum.

== See also ==
- List of maritime museums in the United States
