= José Carlos Millás =

Cuban meteorologist (1889–1965)

- Born: January 22, 1889; Havana, Captaincy General of Cuba, Spanish Empire
- Died: November 28, 1965 (aged 76); Miami, Florida
- Education: University of Chicago; University of Havana
- Awards: National Order of Merit of Cuba; Order of the Aztec Eagle
- Scientific career
- Fields: Meteorology
- Workplaces: National Observatory of Cuba; University of Miami

José Carlos Millás (January 22, 1889 – November 28, 1965) was a Cuban meteorologist. He is known for his research on past Atlantic hurricane seasons, and has been called one of the "fathers of tropical meteorology".

Born in Havana, Cuba, Millás graduated as a civil engineer from the University of Havana. He then took post-graduate courses at the University of Chicago. In 1913 he was appointed assistant director of the National Observatory of Cuba, becoming the institute's director in 1921. In the 1930s, before radar and refined hurricane-tracking equipment was available, Millás collaborated with R. W. Gray and Grady Norton of the Weather Bureau to plot the course of tropical cyclones.

Millás remained in that position at the National Observatory until 1961, when the Cuban Revolution forced him to emigrate to the United States. He became an assistant professor at the University of Miami and conducted research for the Weather Bureau until his death in 1965.

Millás was decorated with the National Order of Merit of Cuba and the Order of the Aztec Eagle.

== Selected publications ==
- ——— (1915), "The Origin and Course of West Indian Hurricanes", Monthly Weather Review, 43 (12): 611, Bibcode:1915MWRv...43..611M, doi:10.1175/1520-0493(1915)43<611a:SAOPAT>2.0.CO;2
- ——— (1922), "Brief Description of a New Dial for the Aneroid", Monthly Weather Review, 50 (7): 359–360, Bibcode:1922MWRv...50..359M, doi:10.1175/1520-0493(1922)50<359b:BDOAND>2.0.CO;2
- ——— (1966), Characteristics of the hurricane season in the North Atlantic Ocean including the Caribbean Sea and Gulf of Mexico, Miami: Institute of Marine Science
- ——— (1968), Hurricanes of the Caribbean and adjacent regions, 1492-1800, Miami: Academy of the Arts and Sciences of the Americas
