= Botija, Cáceres =

Botija
- municipality
- Flag Coat of arms

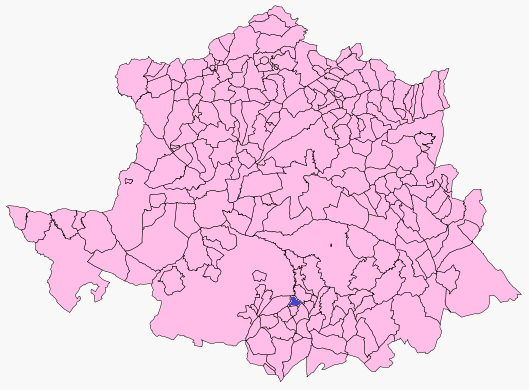
- Country: Spain
- Autonomous community: Extremadura
- Province: Cáceres
- Municipality: Botija

Area
  - Total: 193 km^{2} (75 sq mi)
- Elevation: 411 m (1,348 ft)

Population (2025-01-01)
  - Total: 184
- Time zone: UTC+1 (CET)
  - Summer (DST): UTC+2 (CEST)
- Postal code: 10185
- Website: http://www.botija.es/

Botija is a municipality located in the province of Cáceres, Extremadura, Spain. According to the 2013 census (INE), the municipality has a population of 193 inhabitants.

== See also ==
- List of municipalities in Cáceres
