= Mel Fisher =

American treasure hunter

- Born: August 21, 1922; Hobart, Indiana, U.S.
- Died: December 19, 1998 (aged 76); Key West, Florida, U.S.
- Known for: Treasure hunting
- Spouse: Dolores "Deo" Horton (m. 1953)
- Children: 5

Mel Fisher (August 21, 1922 – December 19, 1998) was an American treasure hunter who spent decades treasure hunting in the Florida Keys and is best known for finding the 1622 wreck of the Nuestra Señora de Atocha in the 1980s.

== Early life ==
Fisher was an Indiana-born former chicken farmer who eventually moved to California. He opened the first diving shop in the state, called "See Da Sea". He attended Purdue University. In 1953, he married Dolores (Deo) Horton who became his business partner. She was one of the first women to learn how to dive and set a women's record by staying underwater for 50 hours. Mel and Deo had five children.

== Slave ship Henrietta Marie ==
In 1972, Fisher's company found the wreck of the slave ship Henrietta Marie during the search for the Nuestra Señora de Atocha and other ships of the 1622 Spanish treasure fleet that had wrecked along the Florida Keys in a hurricane. Two anchors and a cannon were found on the first visit. The wreck was visited again in 1973. Some artifacts were collected from the wreck, including bilboes, iron shackles that were used to restrain slaves. When they realized that the wreck was likely a slave ship, not a treasure ship, the company reburied the artifacts and pieces of the ship's hull that they had exposed and left the site. In 1983 through 1985 Henry Taylor, sub-contracting with Mel Fisher's company, excavated the wreck (known as the English wreck) with the assistance of archaeologist David Moore. The wreck was identified when a bronze ship's bell carrying the inscription The Henrietta Marie 1699 was found at the wreck site. Survey and excavation of the wreck site has continued at intervals.

In 1993, the National Association of Black Scuba Divers (NABS) placed a memorial plaque on the seabed near the wreckage site, which reads “Henrietta Marie: In recognition of the Courage, Pain and Suffering of Enslaved African People. Speak her name and gently touch the souls of our ancestors."

In November 2024, the Mel Fisher Maritime Museum opened a new exhibit about the transatlantic slave trade and its connections with the Florida Keys, centered on artifacts from the Henrietta Marie along with materials sourced elsewhere.

== The Atocha ==
Fisher began searching for the Spanish galleon Nuestra Señora de Atocha named after a parish in Madrid for protection. He discovered silver bars from the wreck in 1973, and in 1975, Mel found five bronze cannons whose markings would prove to be that of the Atocha.

On July 20, 1975, Fisher's oldest son Dirk, his wife Angel, and diver Rick Gage died after their boat sank due to bilge pump failure.

The State of Florida claimed title to the wreck and forced Fisher's company, Treasure Salvors, Inc., into a contract giving 25% of the found treasure to the state. Fisher's company fought the state, claiming the find should be the company's exclusively. After eight years of litigation, the U.S. Supreme Court ruled in favour of Treasure Salvors and it was awarded rights to all found treasure from the vessel on 1 July 1982.

The estimated $450 million cache recovered, known as "The Atocha Motherlode," included 40 tons of gold and silver; there were some 114,000 of the Spanish silver coins known as "pieces of eight", gold coins, Colombian emeralds, gold and silver artifacts, and 1000 silver ingots. The emeralds from the Atocha are some of the finest emeralds in the world. They come from the Muzo Mine in Colombia. The emeralds of Muzo are renowned for their color, fire, and geometry.

Large as it was, this was only roughly half of the treasure that went down with the Atocha. The stern castle of the ship holding more gold and Muzo emeralds has not been found as of August 2017. Also still missing are 300 silver bars and 8 bronze cannons, among other things.

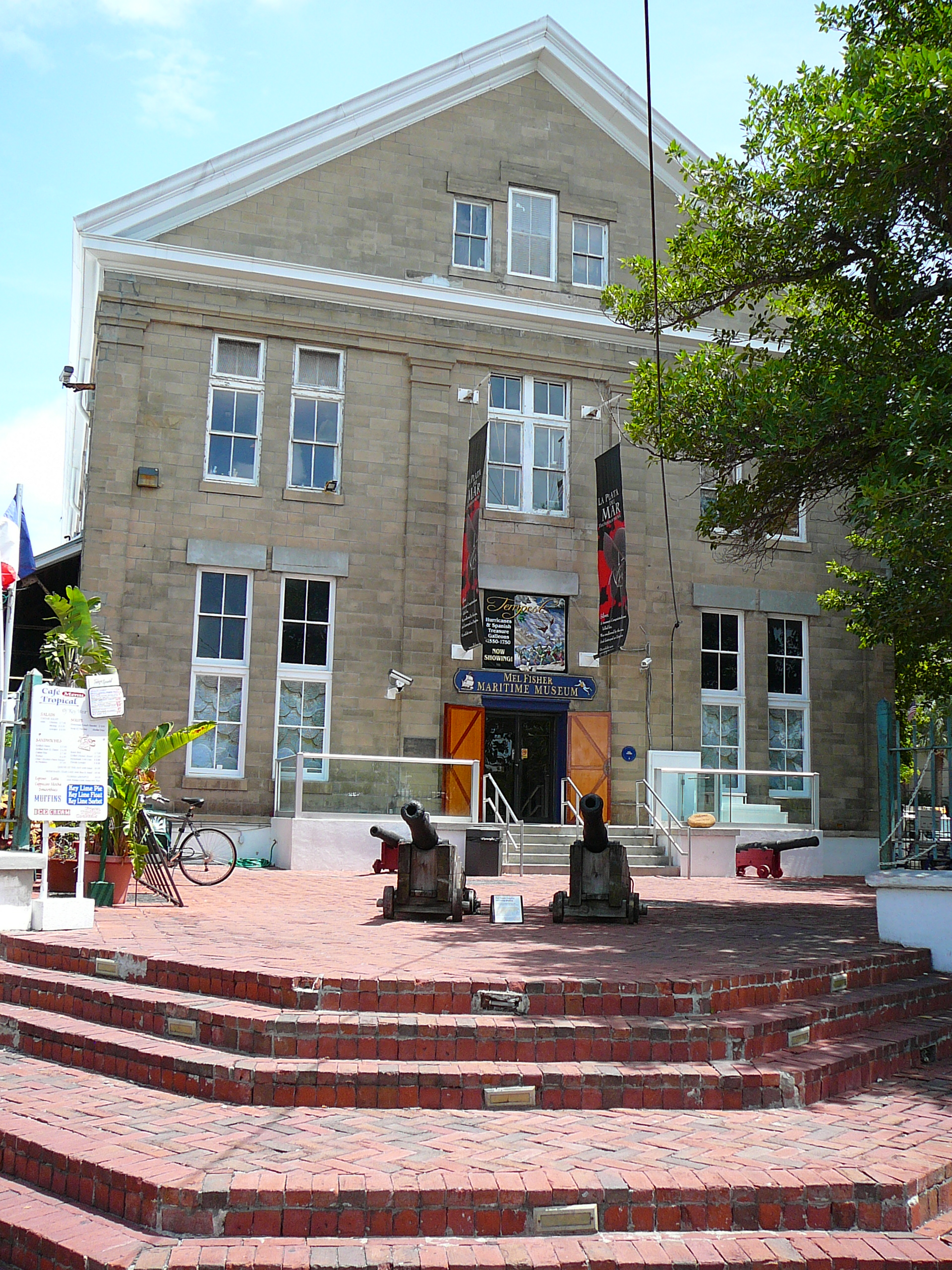
The Mel Fisher Maritime Heritage Museum Key West, Florida

The site of the wreckage of the Atocha, called "The Bank of Spain" (a sandy area 22 feet deep and within 200 yards of the anchor location), is still being worked on and treasures are slowly being recovered.

== Other finds ==
Fisher and Treasure Salvors found remains of several other shipwrecks in Florida waters, including the Atocha's sister galleon the Santa Margarita, lost in the same year, and the remains of a slave ship known as the Henrietta Marie, lost in 1700. Mel Fisher's company, Mel Fisher's Treasures, sold the rights to the 1715 Treasure Fleet shipwreck to Queens Jewels, LLC.

== Counterfeit sales ==
In 1998, Fisher's retail sales subsidiary Crystals of Delaware pled no contest to charges of fraud in a plea agreement with the Monroe County state's attorney for the sale of counterfeit coins bearing a 1733 fleet insignia. Mr. Fisher had purchased the coins from Walter J. Kruse, a longtime associate with a criminal record for previous sale of counterfeit coins, but sold them with a signed certificate stating that he himself had found them. Fisher's company agreed to pay in excess of $67,000 to identified claimants, and to maintain a $50,000 fund for any additional customers who stepped forward during a three year probation period.

== Legacy ==
Fisher hired Duncan Matthewson as chief archaeologist during the Atocha period, and Treasure Salvors, Inc.'s employees became experts in recovery and conservation of underwater artifacts. Fisher agreed to sell Treasure Salvors in 1986 and it remained active as of 2009. Fisher's business continued as Mel Fisher's Treasures. Fisher blended private and public interests when it came to underwater cultural resources. Concern in the U.S., and Florida specifically, for protection of submerged archaeological sites contributed to the 2001 adoption of the UNESCO Convention on the Protection of the Underwater Cultural Heritage.

== In popular culture ==
- Featured on the game show To Tell the Truth episode January 2, 1974.
- Featured in National Geographic Explorer episode Quest for the Atocha Season 2 Episode 16 (1986)
- Featured in City Confidential episode Key West: Pirates in Paradise Season 3, Episode 4 (2000)
- A film about him, Dreams of Gold: The Mel Fisher Story was released in 1986, starring Cliff Robertson and Loretta Swit.
- In the novel Supernatural: Bone Key based on the American TV series Supernatural, protagonist Dean Winchester is infused with all of the ghosts on Key West to fight a vengeance spirit called the Last Calusa. Mel Fisher is one of the spirits infused into Dean who relives Mel's burning desire to find the shipwreck. During the battle, Dean is able to use the energy he gets from Mel Fisher and the other ghosts to his advantage and destroy the Last Calusa once and for all.
- Mentioned in the Microsoft Flight Simulator X Mission: Keys Kayakers
- Featured in Travel Channel's Expedition Unknown Season 3 Episode 17

== Books regarding Mel Fisher ==
- Lyon, Eugene (1979). The Search for the Atocha. Harper & Row. ISBN 0-06-012711-2
- McHaley, Beth; Tucker, Wendy (1991). Mel Fisher "The World's Greatest Treasure Hunter". Salvors, Inc. ISBN 0-935031-56-1
- Weller, Bob Frogfoot (1996). The Dreamweaver: The Story of Mel Fisher and His Quest for the Treasure of the Spanish Galleon Atocha. Fletcher and Fletcher. ISBN 0-9628359-7-8
- Smith, Jedwin (2003). Fatal Treasure: Greed and Death, Emeralds and Gold, and the Obsessive Search for the Legendary Ghost Galleon Atocha. Wiley. ISBN 0-471-69680-3
- Clyne, Pat (2010). The Atocha Odyssey. Terrell Creative. ISBN 1-56944-406-4
- Joynes, Monty (2015). For Love and Treasure: The Life and Times of the World's Most Successful Treasure Hunting Family. Seaside Books. ISBN 978-0-692-39931-6

== See also ==
- Mel Fisher Maritime Heritage Museum
- Mel Fisher's Treasure Museum
