= Botija (instrument) =

Caribbean musical instrument made up of Clay

Coordinates: 39°20′N 6°04′W

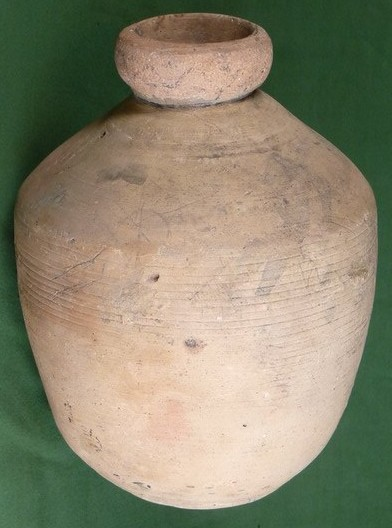
- Botija "perulera" of the 17th century from Seville, Spain. On display at the Museo do Pobo Galego
- Other names: Botijo, Botijuela, Bunga

The botija (botijuela; bunga) is a Caribbean musical instrument of the aerophone type. It is a potbellied earthenware jug or jar with two openings and was used in the early son sextetos in Cuba as a bass instrument.

== Origin ==
Botijas are ceramic jars that were used from early in the 16th century until the middle of the 19th century to ship a wide variety of products from Spain to its colonies, including wine, olive oil, olives, vinegar, and other products. They were then used to hide money underground and were buried to prevent humidity from reaching the floors. In the late 19th century, in Cuba, botijas were dug up and used as musical instruments.

== Use in Cuban son ==
The son genre of music and dance originated in eastern Cuba in the late 19th century. The music's defining characteristic is a pulsing or anticipated bass that falls between the downbeats, leading to the creation of many bass instruments including the botija. Other instruments included a marímbula, serrucho, contrabajo and bajo. Other bass instruments were used according to the size of the musical arrangement or required timbre. The marímbula, for example, was used mainly for smaller ensembles because it was not easily heard, whereas the bajo, an electrical bass, could be easily projected and heard over many other instruments.

Botijas contained two openings, one at the top and one of the side, and were blown into to create bass notes. To create specific pitches, they were filled to specific levels with water. Another technique includes inserting a reed into the opening which the player blows into.

Use of the botija throughout parts of Cuba ended after the early 20th century; it was replaced by the double bass.

== In popular culture ==
In Brazil, the expression "pego(a) com a boca na botija" (caught with his/her mouth on the milk jug) has a similar meaning to "caught with his hand in the cookie jar".

== See also ==
- Udu
- Ghatam
- Son
