= Santa Margarita (shipwreck) =

Spanish shipwreck (sank 1622)

The Santa Margarita was a Spanish ship that sank in a hurricane in the Florida Keys about 40 miles (64 km) west of the island of Key West in 1622.

== History ==
=== Specifications and Cargo ===
Santa Margarita was a Spanish galleon of 600 tons, armed with twenty-five cannon. In 1622, as part of a fleet of 28 ships, she was voyaging to Spain with a significant cargo of New World treasures. The registered wealth included 166,574 silver “pieces of eight” treasure coins, more than 550 ingots of silver weighing approximately 10,000 pounds, and over 9,000 ounces of gold in the form of bars, discs, and bits. Additionally, there was a large amount of contraband treasure smuggled on board to avoid a 20 percent tax to the Spanish king. The ship also carried copper, silverware, indigo, and personal possessions of officers, passengers, and crew, including medical tools, navigational instruments, gold coins, and precious jewelry.

=== The 1622 Hurricane ===
In September 1622, the fleet departed from Cuba but was soon overtaken by a rapidly developing storm. The Santa Margarita, along with five other ships, was wrecked near the Marquesas Keys in the Florida Straits, resulting in the loss of 550 passengers and crew, including 142 from the Santa Margarita. The loss of the treasure was a significant setback for Spain, whose colonial power relied heavily on wealth from the Indies.

=== Early Salvage Efforts ===
Captain Gaspar de Vargas initiated the first salvage attempt shortly after the wreck, employing pearl divers from the island of Margarita. In 1624, Havana politician Francisco Melian obtained a royal salvage contract and utilized a diving bell to aid in the recovery efforts. Despite some success, salvage operations were frequently interrupted by weather and Dutch sea forces, and eventually ceased, leaving much of the treasure buried in the Florida Straits.

== Modern recovery ==
=== Discovery ===
Through extensive research by historian Dr. Eugene Lyon on behalf of treasure hunter Mel Fisher and his company Treasure Salvors, a portion of the wreck of the Santa Margarita was discovered in 1980. Blue Water Ventures, a search and salvage company, partnered with Fisher to recover artifacts from the wreck.

=== Salvage Operations ===
The team, which included historian Lyon, archaeologist/conservator James Sinclair, and Operations Manager Dan Porter, utilized modern technology and digitized old charts to locate significant deposits of treasure. The Santa Margarita broke apart and was scattered in a series of storms. Over time the wood disintegrated and the ship's remains and cargo became buried in deep sand and mud. By mapping and recording all finds, the team was able to identify scatter patterns, which eventually serve as pointers to substantial deposits. Working further north than previous searches, the crew of the company's primary search vessel, Blue Water Rose, made discoveries of elaborate gold artifacts, chains and jewelry, gold bars, rare silver coins, a gold and rock crystal religious reliquary, a solid gold combination toothpick/earwax removal spoon, a solid gold chalice, and one of Santa Margarita's most serendipitous hidden treasures: a lead box containing 16,184 rare and valuable natural pearls, not listed on the ship's manifest-now believed to have originated from the pearl island of Margarita. The value of the recovered treasure has exceeded $16 million to date.

=== Significance and Display ===
Artifacts from the Santa Margarita are currently on display at the Mel Fisher Maritime Heritage Museum in Key West.
