= Nuestra Señora de Atocha =

Vessel of a fleet of ships that sank in a hurricane off the Florida Keys in 1622

Coordinates: 24.5314°N 82.8306°W

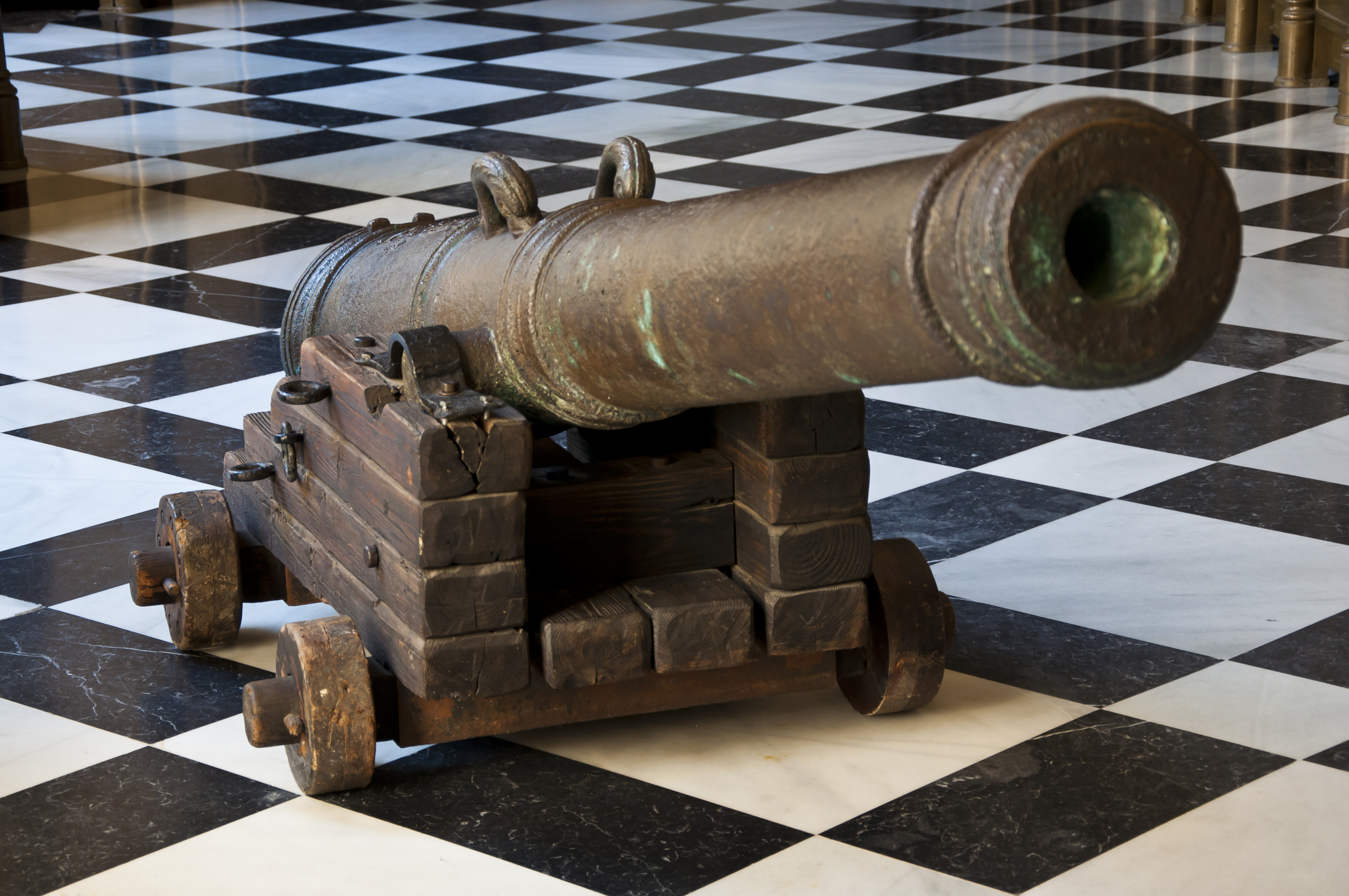
- Cannon from Nuestra Señora de Atocha at the Archivo General de Indias, Seville

History

Spain
- Name: Nuestra Señora de Atocha
- Owner: King Philip IV
- Ordered: 1620
- Builder: Havana Shipyard
- Acquired: early 1621
- Commissioned: 1621
- Stricken: 1623
- Fate: Sank 6 September 1622

General characteristics
- Type: Galleon
- Masts: 3
- Foremast: 2 square-rigged
- Mainmast: 2 square-rigged
- Mizzenmast: 1 lateen-rigged
- Other masts: Spritsail off bowsprit
- Tons burthen: 550 toneladas
- Length: 34 m (111 ft 7 in)
- Beam: 10 m (32 ft 10 in)
- Draught: 4.3 m (14 ft 1 in)
- Complement: 90
- Crew: 110
- Armament: 20 heavy guns plus 4–8 versos
- Notes: Hull constructed (rather poorly) from mahogany rather than traditional oak

Nuestra Señora de Atocha ('Our Lady of Atocha') was a Spanish treasure galleon and the most widely known vessel of a fleet of ships that sank in a hurricane off the Florida Keys in 1622. At the time of her sinking, Nuestra Señora de Atocha was heavily laden with copper, silver, gold, tobacco, gems, and indigo from Spanish ports at Cartagena and Porto Bello in New Granada (present-day Colombia and Panama, respectively) and Havana, bound for Spain. The Nuestra Señora de Atocha was named for the Basilica of Nuestra Señora de Atocha in Madrid, Spain. It was a heavily armed Spanish galleon that served as the almirante (rear guard) for the Spanish fleet. It would trail behind the other ships in the flotilla to prevent an attack from the rear.

Much of the wreck of Nuestra Señora de Atocha was famously recovered by an American commercial treasure hunting expedition in 1985. Following a lengthy court battle against the State of Florida, the finders were ultimately awarded sole ownership of the rights to the treasure.

== Building and dimensions ==
The Atocha was built for the Spanish Crown in Havana in 1620. She was rated at 550 tons, with an overall length of 112 feet, a beam of 34 feet, and a draft of 14 feet. She carried a square-rigged fore and mainmast and a lateen-rigged mizzenmast. Although there are no existing records, she likely had a high sterncastle, low waist, and high forecastle as was typical for an early 17th century Spanish galleon.

== Sinking ==
Nuestra Señora de Atocha had been delayed in Veracruz before she could rendezvous in Havana with the vessels of the Tierra Firme (Mainland) Fleet. The treasure, which arrived by mule in Panama City, was so immense that it took two months to record and load it onto the Atocha. After still more delays in Havana, what was ultimately a 28-ship convoy did not manage to depart for Spain until 4 September 1622, six weeks late. Each ship in the convoy carried crew, soldiers, passengers, provisions, and treasures from all over South America. The Atocha alone carried cargo whose value was estimated to range between $250 and $500 million, including silver from Bolivia, Peru and Mexico, gold and emeralds from Colombia, and pearls from Venezuela, as well as more common goods including worked silverware, tobacco, and bronze cannons.

In the second day of its voyage from Havana, the convoy was overtaken by a hurricane in the Florida Straits. By the morning of 6 September, eight of the ships had sunk and their remains lay scattered from Marquesas Key to the Dry Tortugas. The Nuestra Señora de Atocha had lost all of her 265 crew and passengers except for three sailors and two slaves, who survived by clinging to the mizzenmast. Among the sailors killed in the disaster was Bartolomé García de Nodal, explorer of the Straits of Magellan surrounding Cape Horn at the southern tip of South America. All of the treasure sank with the ship, approximately 30 leagues (140 km) from Havana.

After the surviving ships brought the news of the disaster back to Havana, Spanish authorities dispatched another five ships to salvage Nuestra Señora de Atocha and Santa Margarita, which had run aground nearby. Nuestra Señora de Atocha had sunk in approximately 17 metres (56 ft) of water, making it difficult for divers to retrieve any of the cargo or guns from the ship. A second hurricane on 5 October of that year made attempts at salvage even more difficult by scattering the wreckage of the sunken ship still farther.

The Spaniards undertook salvage operations for several years with the use of slaves, and recovered nearly half of the registered part of its cargo from the holds of Santa Margarita. The principal method used for the recovery of this cargo was a large brass diving bell with a glass window on one side: a slave would be forced to ride to the bottom, recover an item, and return to the surface by being hauled up by the men on deck. It was often lethal; dead slaves were actually recorded as a business expense by the captains of salvage ships.

The loss of the 1622 fleet was a severe blow to Spanish commercial interests, forcing the crown to borrow more to finance its role in the ongoing Thirty Years' War and to sell several galleons to raise funds. The Spanish worked diligently and were able to salvage most of the Santa Margarita over the next ten years. However, in 60 years of searching, the Spanish never located the Atocha.

== Modern recovery and legal battle ==
Beginning in 1969, American treasure hunters Mel Fisher, Finley Ricard and a team of sub-contractors, funded by investors and others in a joint venture, Treasure Salvors, Inc., searched the sea bed for Nuestra Señora de Atocha for sixteen and a half years. In 1970, Fisher had recovered portions of the wrecked cargo of the sister ship Santa Margarita. He also proposed the idea to several other potential helpers, who were discouraged by the fact that this dangerous professional diving job would be paid at minimum wage unless the ship could be found. Silver bars apparently from the Nuestra Señora de Atocha were found in 1973, and five bronze cannons whose markings would prove to be that of the Atocha were found by Fisher's son Dirk in 1975. Subsequently, a substantial part of its remaining cargo of silver, gold and emeralds was discovered. It was Fisher's son, Kane, who radioed the news to Treasure Salvors headquarters on the Florida coast, from the salvage boat Dauntless.

The salvaged coins, both gold and silver, were minted primarily between 1598 and 1621, although numerous earlier dates were represented as well, some of the dates extending well back into the 16th century. Many of the dates and types of the period had been either rare or unknown prior to the salvage of the wreck. It is understood by experts that the sterncastle, the part of the ship that would hold most of the gold and rare Muzo emeralds, is still missing from the shipwreck. These and other valuable items would have been stored in the captain's cabin for safekeeping in the rear part of Nuestra Señora de Atocha.

After the discovery in 1971, the State of Florida claimed title to the wreck and forced Treasure Salvors, Inc. into a contract giving 25% of the found treasure to the state. Treasure Salvors fought the state, claiming the find should belong to those that discovered the treasure exclusively. After ten years of litigation, the U.S. Supreme Court ruled in favour of Treasure Salvors on 1 July 1982, and it was awarded rights to all found treasure from the vessel. Fisher died on 19 December 1998.

In June 2011, divers from Mel Fisher's Treasure Salvors found an antique emerald ring believed to be from the wreck. The salvage crew estimated the ring to be worth $500,000. The ring was found 56 kilometres (35 mi) from Key West, along with two silver spoons and other artifacts. In 2014, Nuestra Señora de Atocha was added to the Guinness Book of World Records for being the most valuable shipwreck to be recovered, as it was carrying roughly 40 tonnes of gold and silver, and 32 kilograms (71 lb) of emeralds, although this record has now been superseded by the discovery of the San José in 2015.

In June 2026, divers from Mel Fisher's Treasure Salvors found a silver bar believed to be from the wreck. The salvage crew estimated the bar to be worth between $50,000 to $100,000.
