= Ursula von der Leyen =

President of the European Commission since 2019

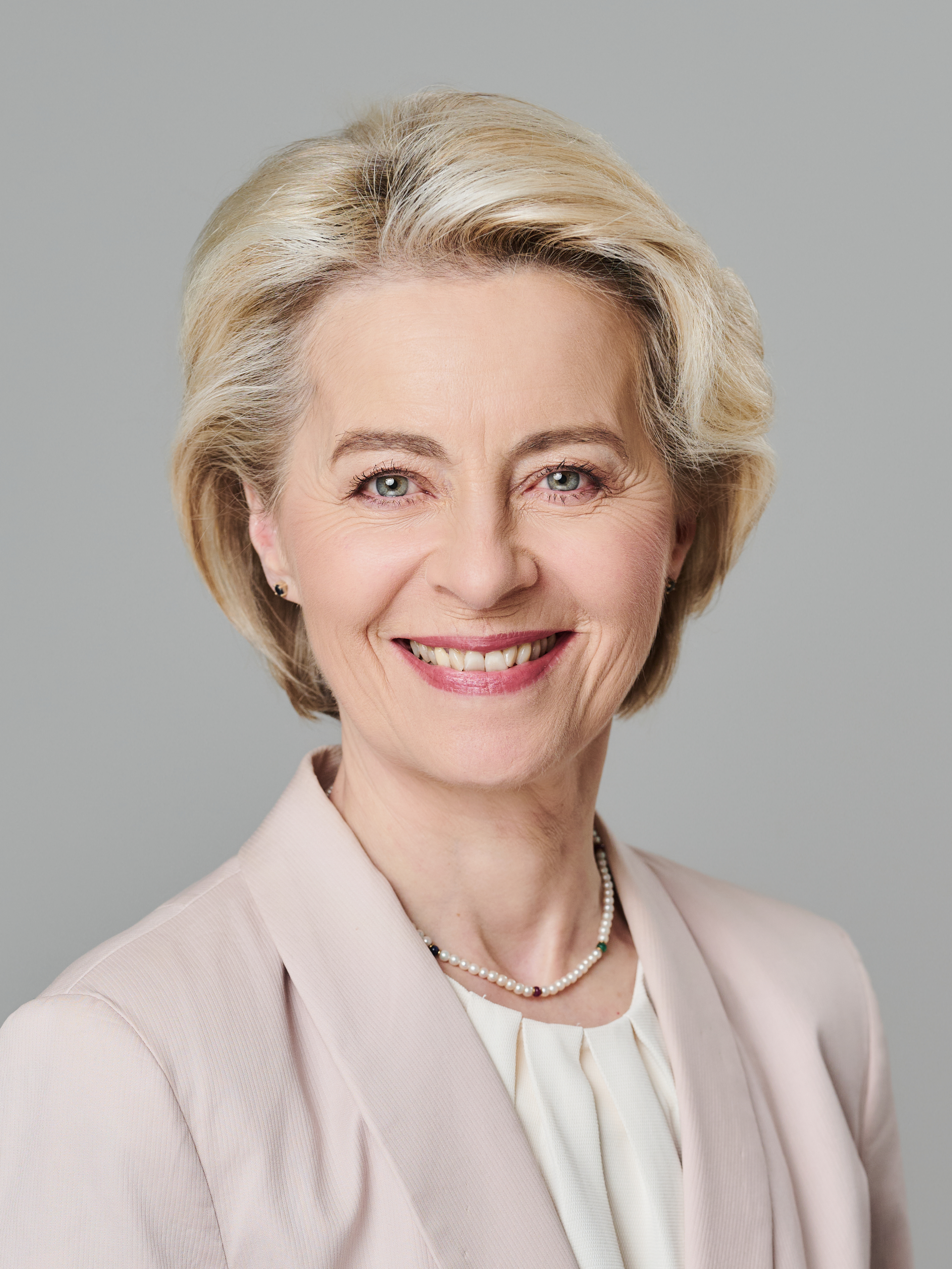
- Official portrait, 2024

President of the European Commission
- Incumbent
- Assumed office 1 December 2019
- Commission: Von der Leyen I and II
- Preceded by: Jean-Claude Juncker
German federal cabinet
Minister for Defence
In office 17 December 2013 – 17 July 2019
| Chancellor | Angela Merkel |
| Preceded by | Thomas de Maizière |
| Succeeded by | Annegret Kramp-Karrenbauer |
Minister for Labour and Social Affairs
In office 30 November 2009 – 17 December 2013
| Chancellor | Angela Merkel |
| Preceded by | Franz Josef Jung |
| Succeeded by | Andrea Nahles |
Minister for Family Affairs, Senior Citizens, Women and Youth
In office 22 November 2005 – 30 November 2009
| Chancellor | Angela Merkel |
| Preceded by | Renate Schmidt |
| Succeeded by | Kristina Schröder |
Party roles
Deputy Leader of the Christian Democratic Union
In office 15 November 2010 – 22 November 2019 Serving with: Volker Bouffier; Julia Klöckner; Armin Laschet; Thomas Strobl
| Leader | Angela Merkel; Annegret Kramp-Karrenbauer |
| Preceded by | Christian Wulff |
| Succeeded by | Silvia Breher |
Lower Saxony cabinet
Minister for Social Affairs, Women and Families and Health
In office 4 March 2003 – 22 November 2005
| Minister-President | Christian Wulff |
| Preceded by | Gitta Trauernicht |
| Succeeded by | Mechthild Ross-Luttmann |
Parliamentary constituencies
Member of the Bundestag for Lower Saxony
In office 27 October 2009 – 31 July 2019
| Preceded by | Multi-member district |
| Succeeded by | Ingrid Pahlmann |
| Constituency | Christian Democratic Union list |
Member of the Landtag of Lower Saxony for Lehrte
In office 4 March 2003 – 7 December 2005
| Preceded by | Gerhard Schröder (1998) |
| Succeeded by | Dorothee Prüssner |

Personal details
- Born: Ursula Gertrud Albrecht; 8 October 1958 (age 68) Ixelles, Brussels, Belgium
- Citizenship: Germany
- Party: Christian Democratic Union (since 1990)
- Other political affiliations: European People's Party
- Spouse: Heiko von der Leyen (m. 1986)
- Children: 7
- Parent: Ernst Albrecht (father)
- Relatives: Hans-Holger Albrecht (brother); Carl Albrecht (grandfather)
- Education: University of Göttingen; London School of Economics; Hannover Medical School (MD, MPH)
- Occupation: Politician; Physician; Research fellow
- Website: ec.europa.eu/president
- Von der Leyen's voice Speech following the Russian invasion of Ukraine; Recorded 24 February 2022

Ursula Gertrud von der Leyen (Note: German pronunciation: [ˈʊʁzula ˈɡɛʁtʁuːt fɔn dɐ ˈlaɪən]) (née Albrecht; born 8 October 1958) is a German politician and physician who has served as President of the European Commission since 2019. She served in the German federal government between 2005 and 2019, holding positions in Angela Merkel's cabinet, most recently as Federal Minister for Defence. She is a member of the centre-right Christian Democratic Union (CDU) and its affiliated European political party, the European People's Party (EPP). On 7 March 2024, the EPP elected her as its Spitzenkandidat to lead the campaign for the 2024 European Parliament elections. She was re-elected to head the Commission in July 2024.

Von der Leyen was born and raised in Brussels, Belgium, to German parents. Her father, Ernst Albrecht, was one of the first European civil servants. She was brought up bilingually in German and French, and moved to Germany in 1971 when her father became involved in German politics. She studied economics in Göttingen, Münster, and London, and in 1987, she acquired her medical licence from Hanover Medical School. After marrying fellow physician Heiko von der Leyen, she lived for four years in the United States with her family in the 1990s. After returning to Germany she became involved in local politics in the Hanover region in the late 1990s, and she served as a cabinet minister in the state government of Lower Saxony from 2003 to 2005.

In 2005, von der Leyen joined the federal cabinet, first as Minister for Family Affairs and Youth from 2005 to 2009, then taking on the role of Minister for Labour and Social Affairs from 2009 to 2013, and finally serving as Minister for Defence from 2013 to 2019, the first woman to do so. When she left office, she was the only minister to have served continuously in Merkel's cabinet since Merkel became chancellor. She served as a deputy leader of the CDU from 2010 to 2019, and was regarded as a leading contender to succeed Merkel as the chancellor of Germany and as the favourite to become the secretary general of NATO after Jens Stoltenberg. British defence secretary Michael Fallon described her in 2019 as "a star presence" in the NATO community and "the doyenne of NATO ministers for over five years". In 2023, she was again regarded as the favourite to take the role.

On 2 July 2019, von der Leyen was proposed by the European Council as the candidate for president of the European Commission. She was then elected by the European Parliament on 16 July; (Note: The process for electing the president of the European Commission is described in Article 17(7) of the Treaty on European Union.) she took office on 1 December, becoming the first woman to hold the office. Her tenure has been marked by the COVID-19 pandemic, the European Green Deal, the Russo-Ukrainian war, as well as American threats to annex Greenland. In November 2022 she announced that her commission would work to establish an International Criminal Tribunal for the Russian Federation. The EU–US Agreement on Reciprocal, Fair, and Balanced Trade, announced in August 2025, exposed her to criticism from France and Germany.

On 18 July 2024, von der Leyen was re-elected as Commission President by the European Parliament with an absolute majority of 401 members of the European Parliament out of 720; strengthened by around 30 votes compared to her election in 2019. She was named the most powerful woman in the world by Forbes in 2022, 2023, 2024, and 2025.

== Family and early life ==
Von der Leyen family arms

Von der Leyen was born in 1958 in Ixelles, Brussels, Belgium, where she lived until she was 13 years old. In 1971, she relocated to Sehnde in the Hanover region after her father had become CEO of the food company Bahlsen and involved in state politics in Lower Saxony.

In 1986, she married physician Heiko von der Leyen, a member of the von der Leyen family, which belonged to the German nobility and made its fortune as silk merchants. They have seven children, born between 1987 and 1999. Von der Leyen is Lutheran.

She lives with her family on a farm in Burgdorf near Hanover where they keep horses. She is a keen equestrian and has been involved in competitive horseriding.

== Education and professional career ==
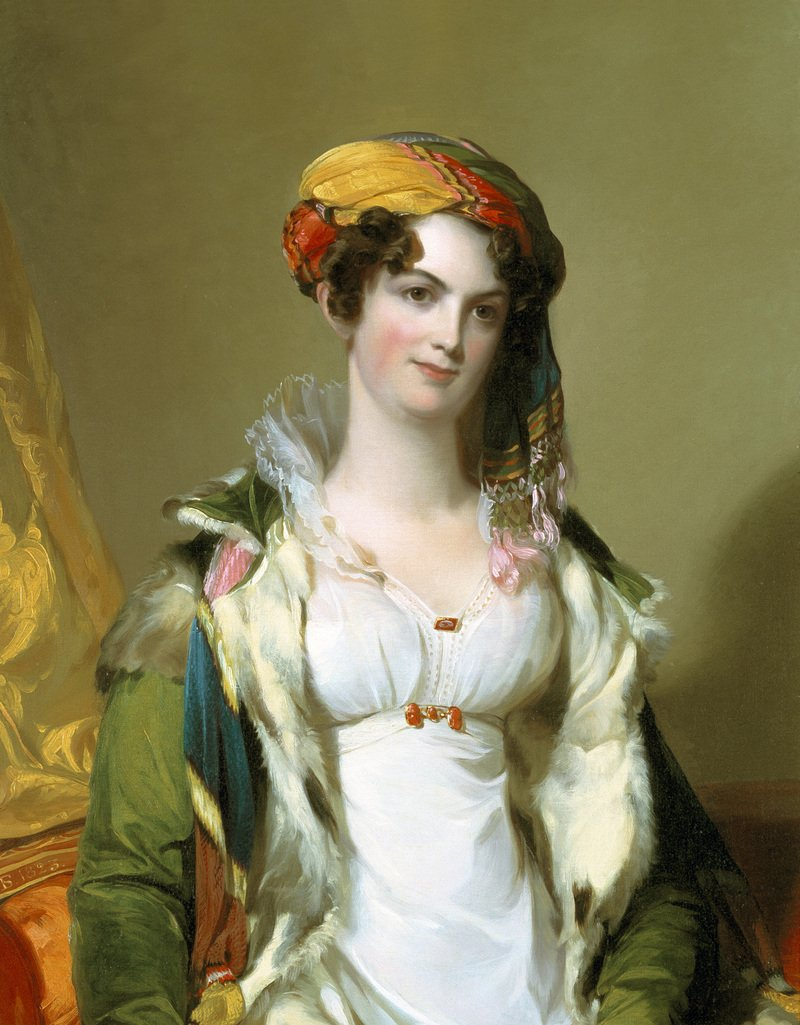
Portrait of Mrs. Robert Gilmor Jr. — Ursula von der Leyen's great-grandmother of the influential South Carolinian planter class family Ladson — painting by Thomas Sully, c. 1823. Von der Leyen lived in London in the late 1970s under the alias Rose Ladson.

Von der Leyen moved to the Hanover Region in 1971 when her father entered politics to become minister-president of the state of Lower Saxony in 1976. In 1977, she started studying economics at the University of Göttingen. At the height of the fear of communist terrorism in West Germany, she fled to London in 1978 after her family was told that the Red Army Faction (RAF) was planning to kidnap her due to her being the daughter of a prominent politician. She spent more than a year in hiding in London, where she lived with protection from Scotland Yard under the name Rose Ladson to avoid detection and enrolled at the London School of Economics. A German diminutive of Rose, Röschen, had been her nickname since childhood, while Ladson was the name of her American great-grandmother's family, originally from Northamptonshire, who immigrated to Charleston, South Carolina in 1679, became wealthy landowners and slave traders of the Planter class, related to families of governors of the Province of Carolina. She said that she "lived more than she studied", and that London was "the epitome of modernity: freedom, the joy of life, trying everything" which "gave me an inner freedom that I have kept till today". She returned to Germany in 1979 but lived with a security detail at her side for several years.

In 1980, after three years of studying economics, she switched to medicine with a specialisation in gynaecology, at the Hannover Medical School, where she obtained her medical licence as a physician.

From 1988 to 1992, she worked as an assistant physician at the Women's Clinic of the Hannover Medical School. Upon completing her doctoral studies, she defended the thesis and graduated as a Doctor of Medicine in 1991. Following the birth of twins, she was a housewife in Stanford, California, from 1992 to 1996, while her husband was a faculty member of Stanford University, returning to Germany in 1996.

From 1998 to 2002, she taught at the Department of Epidemiology, Social Medicine and Health System Research at the Hanover Medical School. In 2001, she earned a Master of Public Health degree at the institution.

=== Plagiarism accusations ===
In 2015, researchers collaborating at the VroniPlag Wiki reviewed von der Leyen's 1991 doctoral dissertation and alleged that 43.5% of the thesis pages contained plagiarism and in 23 cases citations were used that did not verify claims for which they were given. Multiple notable German academics such as Gerhard Dannemann and Volker Rieble publicly accused von der Leyen of intended plagiarism. The Hannover Medical School conducted an investigation and concluded in March 2016 that while the thesis contains plagiarism, no intention to deceive could be proven.

The university decided not to revoke von der Leyen's medical degree. Critics questioned the independence of the commission that reviewed the thesis as von der Leyen personally knew its director from joint work for an alumni association. Various media outlets also criticised the decision for being non-transparent, not according to established rules, and failing to secure high academic standards.

== Early political career ==
Ursula von der Leyen joined the CDU in 1990, and became active in local politics in Lower Saxony in 1996, shortly after she had returned to Germany after living in California. She was a member of the committee on social policy of CDU in Lower Saxony from 1996, and also became active in the association of medical doctors in the CDU party.

=== In the Lower Saxony Landtag, 2003–2005 ===
Ursula von der Leyen was elected to the Parliament of Lower Saxony in the 2003 state election for Lehrte, the same constituency then-Chancellor Gerhard Schröder represented from 1986 to 1998. From 2003 to 2005 she was a minister in the state government of Lower Saxony, serving in the cabinet of Christian Wulff, with responsibility for social affairs, women, family, and health.

In 2003, von der Leyen was part of a group assigned by the then-opposition leader and CDU chairwoman Angela Merkel to draft alternative proposals for social welfare reform in response to Chancellor Gerhard Schröder's "Agenda 2010". The so-called Herzog Commission, named after its chairman, the former German president Roman Herzog, recommended a comprehensive package of reform proposals including, among other things, decoupling health and nursing care premiums from people's earnings and levying a monthly lump sum across the board instead.

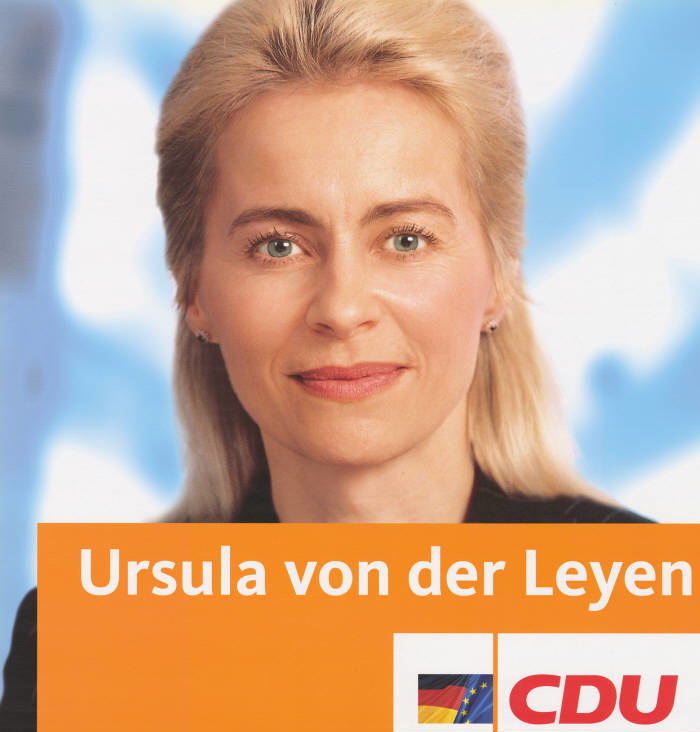
2005 campaign poster featuring von der Leyen

Ahead of the 2005 federal elections, Angela Merkel chose Ursula von der Leyen to cover the family and social security portfolio in her shadow cabinet. In the negotiations to form a government following the election, von der Leyen led the CDU/CSU delegation in the working group on families; her co-chair from the SPD was Renate Schmidt.

=== In the Bundestag, 2005–2019 ===
==== Minister of Family Affairs and Youth, 2005–2009 ====
In 2005, Ursula von der Leyen was appointed Federal Minister of Family Affairs and Youth in the cabinet of Angela Merkel. On the 60th anniversary of the founding of Israel, von der Leyen participated in the first joint cabinet meeting of the governments of Germany and Israel in Jerusalem in March 2008.

==== Minister of Labour and Social Affairs, 2009–2013 ====
At the federal election of 2009, von der Leyen was elected to the Bundestag, Germany's Parliament, representing the 42nd electoral district of Hanover, alongside Edelgard Bulmahn of the Social Democrats. In the negotiations to form a coalition government following the elections, she led the CDU/CSU delegation in the working group on health policy; her co-chair from the FDP was Philipp Rösler. She was reappointed as family minister, but on 30 November 2009 succeeded Franz Josef Jung as Federal Minister of Labour and Social Affairs.

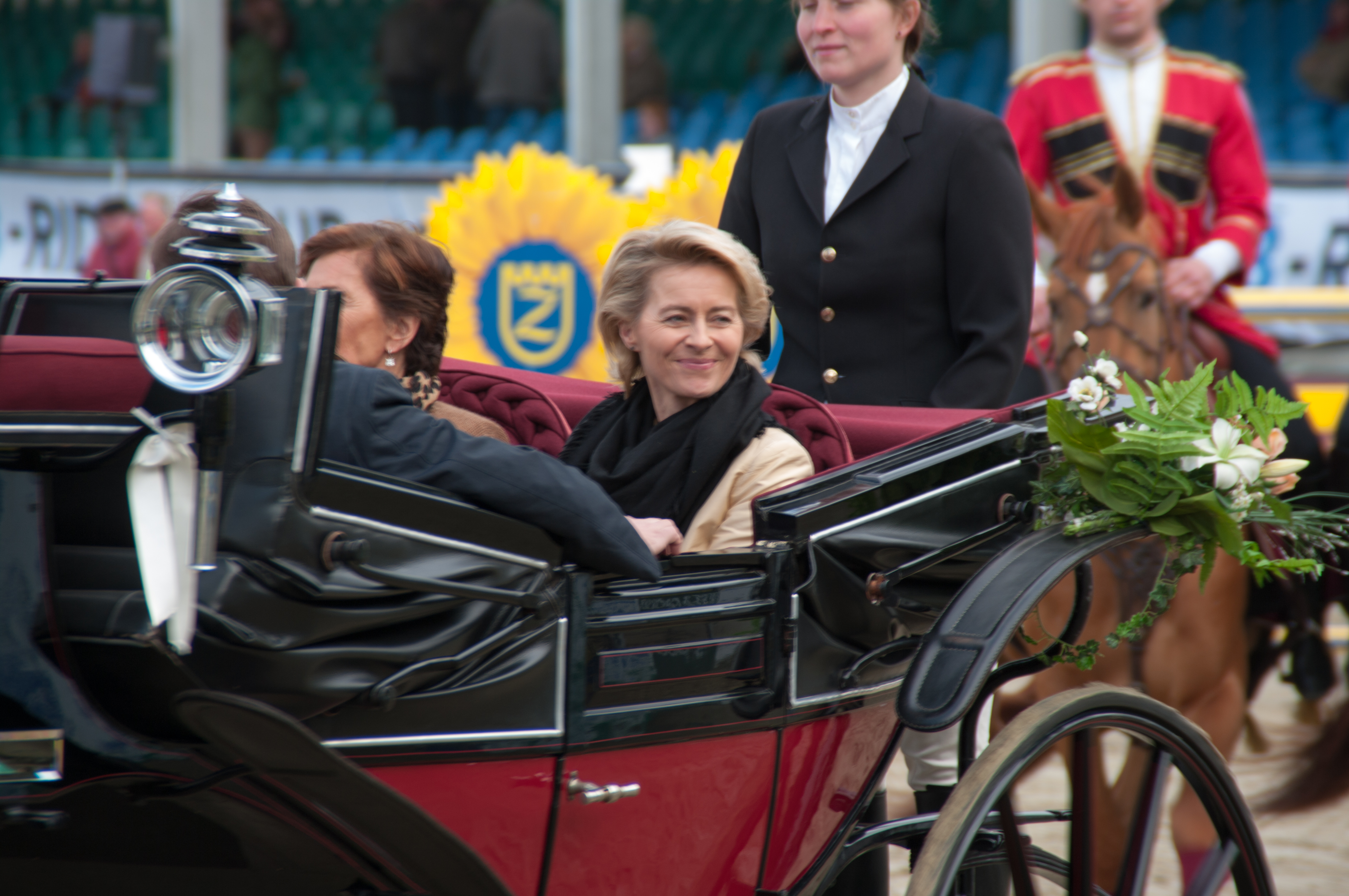
Ursula von der Leyen at a horse show in Hagen in Osnabrück, Germany, in 2013

During her time in office, von der Leyen cultivated the image of being the social conscience of the CDU and helped Merkel to move the CDU into the political centre-ground. In speaking out for increasing the number of childcare nurseries, for the introduction of a women's quota for listed companies' main boards, for gay marriage and a nationwide minimum wage, von der Leyen made enemies among the more traditionalist party members and won admirers on the left.

Von der Leyen also lobbied for lowering the barriers to immigration for some foreign workers, to fight shortages of skilled workers in Germany. In 2013, she concluded an agreement with the Government of the Philippines that was aimed at helping Filipino health care professionals to gain employment in Germany. A vital provision of the agreement is that the Filipino workers are to be employed on the same terms and conditions as their German counterparts.

Von der Leyen was initially considered the front-runner to be nominated by the ruling CDU/CSU parties for election as President of Germany in the 2010 presidential election, but Christian Wulff was eventually chosen as the parties' candidate. The news media later reported that Wulff's nomination came as a blow to Merkel, whose choice of von der Leyen had been blocked by the two parties' more conservative state premiers.

In November 2010, von der Leyen was elected (with 85% of the votes) as one of four deputies of CDU chairwoman Merkel, serving alongside Volker Bouffier, Norbert Röttgen and Annette Schavan. Later that month, she told the Bild am Sonntag newspaper that the CDU should consider establishing a formal voting process for choosing future candidates for Chancellor. In 2012, she was re-elected (with 69% of the votes) as one of Merkel's deputies as CDU chairwoman, this time serving alongside Bouffier, Julia Klöckner, Armin Laschet and Thomas Strobl.

In the negotiations to form a government following the 2013 federal elections, von der Leyen led the CDU/CSU delegation in the labour policy working group, with Andrea Nahles of the SPD as her co-chair.

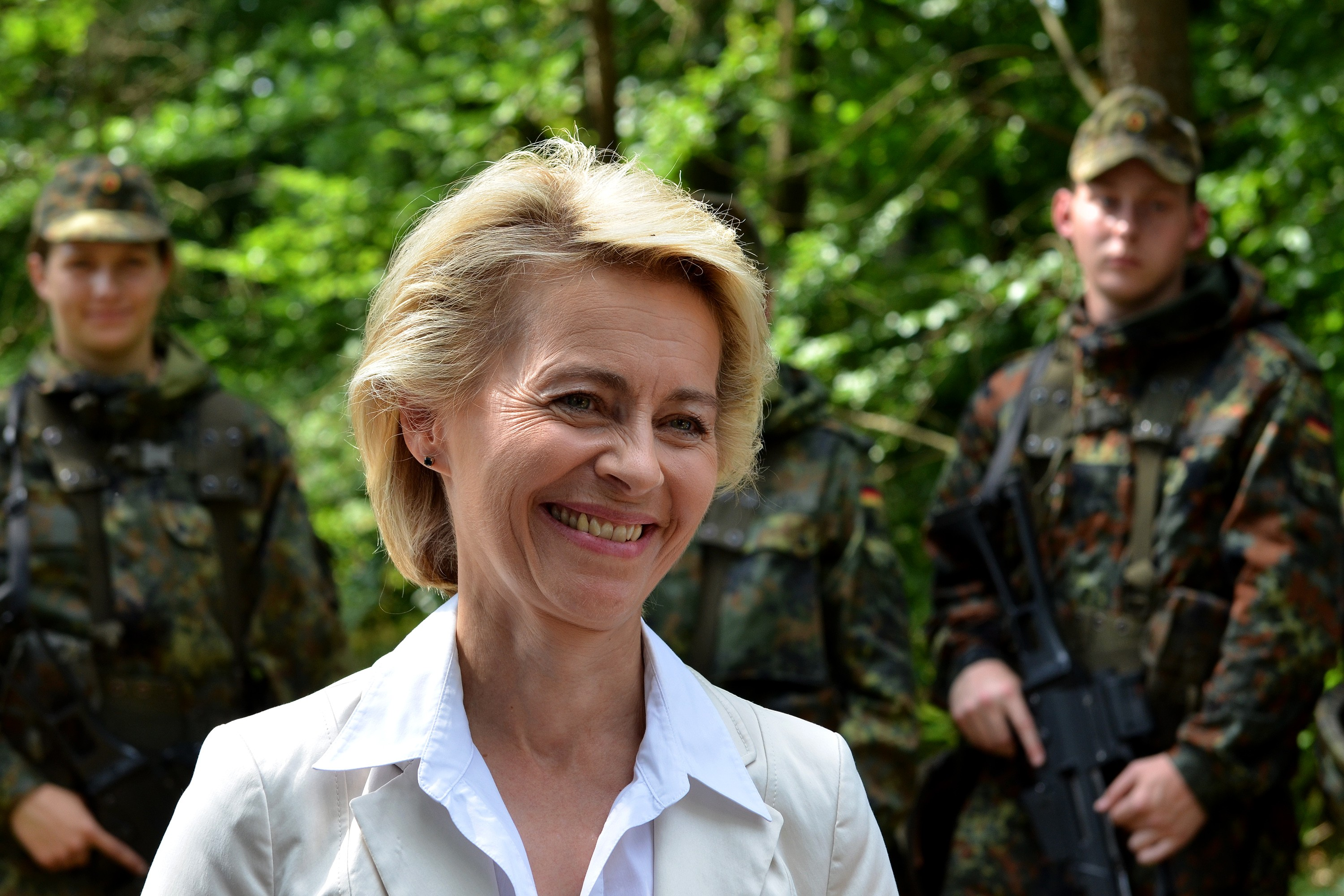
Von der Leyen with German soldiers during a visit to the Field Marshal Rommel Barracks, Augustdorf (2014)

==== Minister of Defence, 2013–2019 ====
In December 2013, Ursula von der Leyen was appointed by Merkel as Germany's first female defence minister. By placing a significant party figure such as von der Leyen at the head of the Defence Ministry, Merkel was widely seen as reinvigorating the scandal-ridden ministry's morale and prestige. Until her 2019 appointment as the president of the European Commission, she was the only minister to remain with Merkel since she became chancellor in 2005. In December 2014, von der Leyen had her fingerprint cloned by a German hacker who was able to use the commercially available VeriFinger product from Neurotechnology UAB to replicate her fingerprint using photographs taken with a "standard photo camera". In August 2016, von der Leyen joined the World Economic Forum board of trustees. In September 2016, von der Leyen chaired the EPP Defence Ministers Meeting, which gathers EPP defence ministers ahead of meetings of the Council of the European Union. Former British Secretary of State for Defence Michael Fallon noted in 2019 that she had been "a star presence" in the NATO community and "the doyenne of NATO ministers for over five years". She has faced domestic criticism for her leadership style, reliance on outside consultants, and continued gaps in military readiness.

==== International crises ====
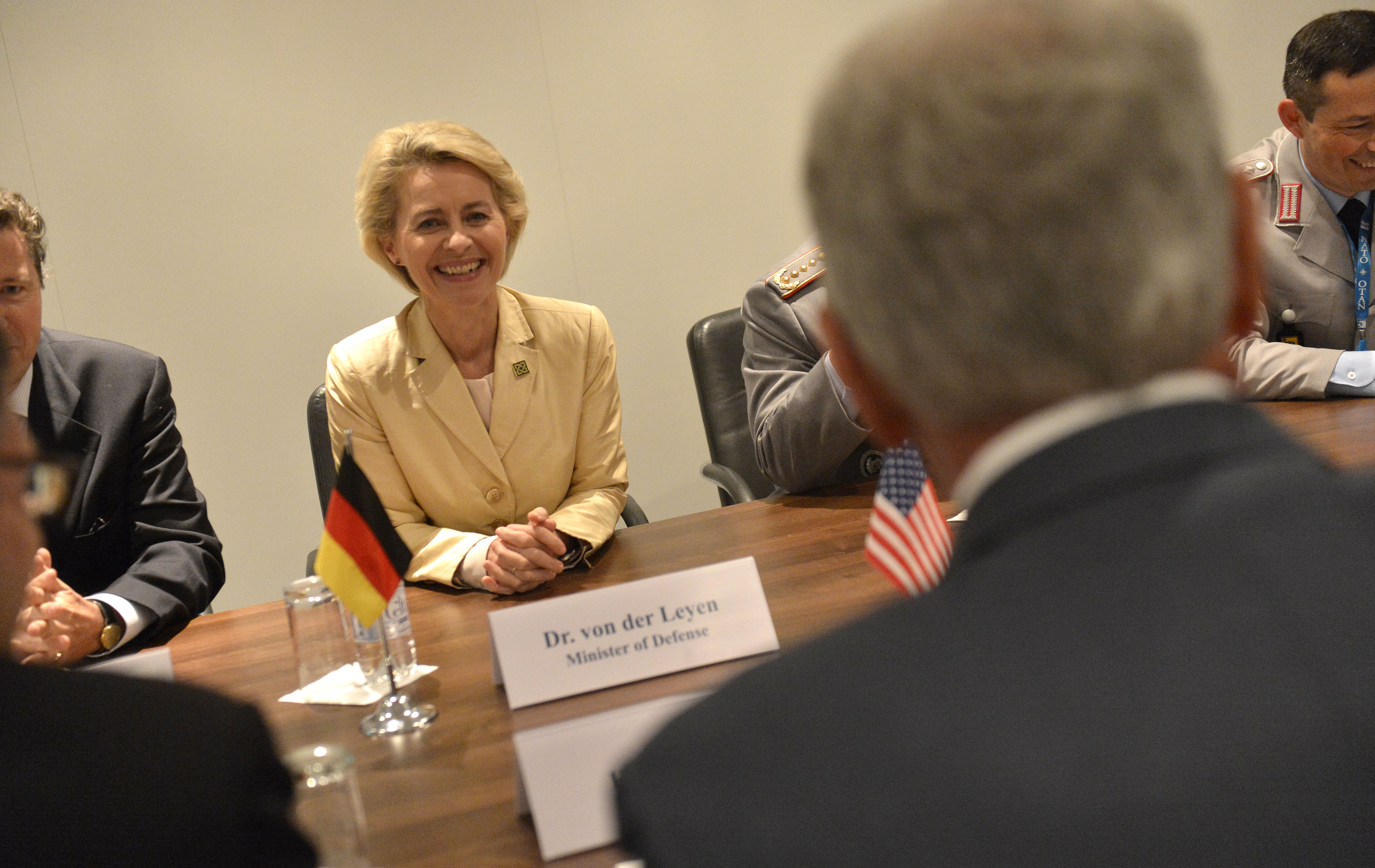
Chuck Hagel and Ursula von der Leyen at the September 2014 NATO summit in Newport, Wales

Within her first year in office, von der Leyen visited the Bundeswehr troops stationed in Afghanistan three times and oversaw the gradual withdrawal of German soldiers from the country as NATO was winding down its 13-year combat mission ISAF. In September 2015, she signalled that she was open to delaying the withdrawal of 850 German soldiers from Afghanistan beyond 2016 after the Taliban's surprise seizure of the northern city of Kunduz. German forces had been based in Kunduz as part of NATO-led ISAF and remained stationed in the north of the country. She later opposed the troop withdrawal from Afghanistan.

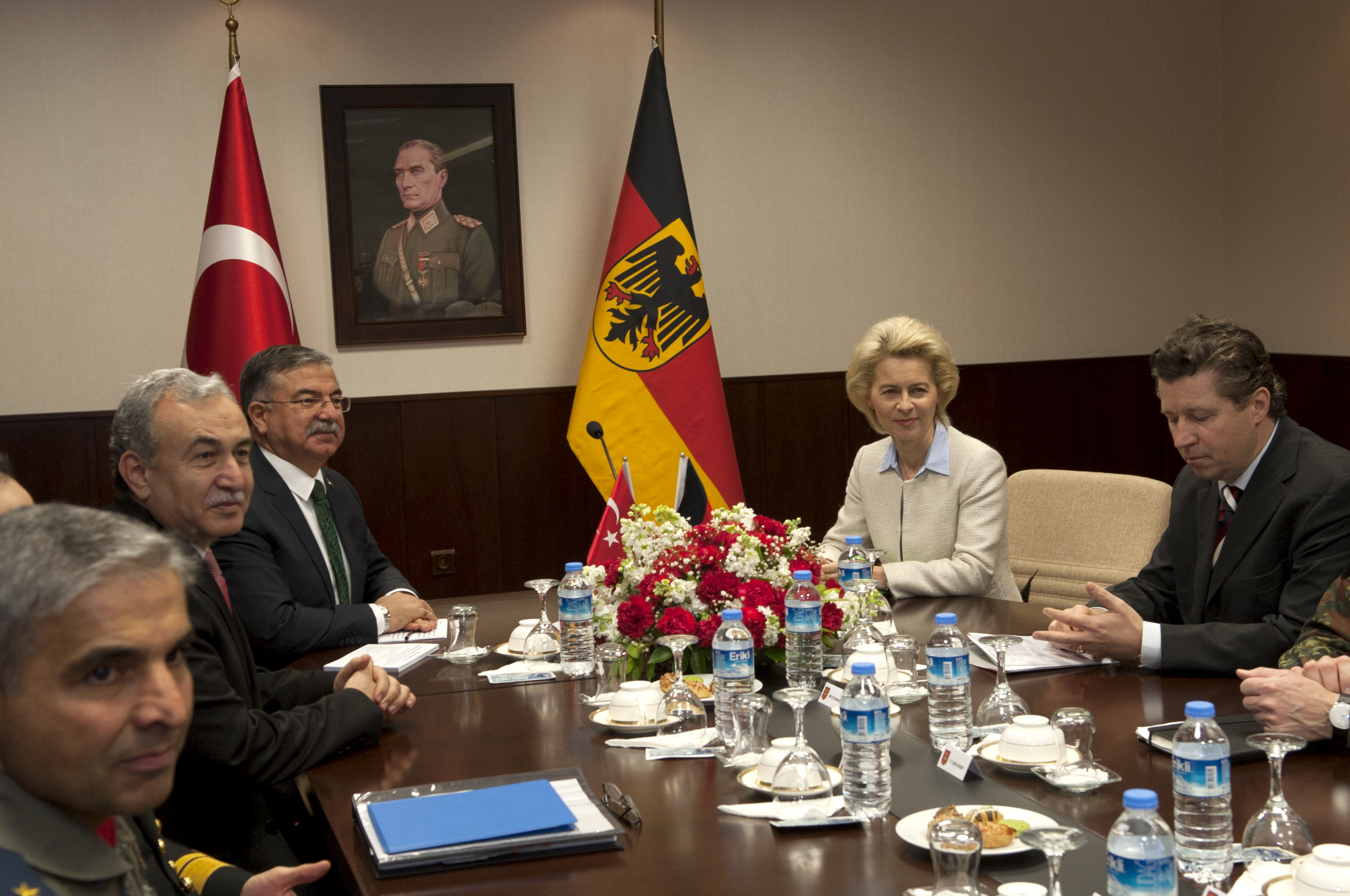
Von der Leyen and General Bekir Ercan Van (far left), the commander of Incirlik Air Base, who was accused of complicity in the 2016 Turkish coup d'état attempt

In the summer of 2014, she was instrumental in Germany's decision to resupply the Kurdish Peshmerga fighters with lethal assistance. Following criticism from German officials of Turkish president Recep Tayyip Erdoğan's escalation of the Kurdish–Turkish conflict in August 2015, von der Leyen decided to let Germany's three-year Patriot missile batteries mission to southern Turkey lapse in January 2016 instead of seeking parliamentary approval to extend it. That same month, she participated in the first joint cabinet meeting of the governments of Germany and Turkey in Berlin. By April 2016, under von der Leyen's leadership, the German Federal Armed Forces announced they would commit 65 million Euro to establish a permanent presence at Incirlik Air Base, as part of Germany's commitment to the military intervention against ISIL.

At the Munich Security Conference in February 2015, von der Leyen publicly defended the German refusal to supply Ukraine with weapons. Stressing that it was necessary to remain united in Europe over Ukraine, she argued that negotiations with Russia, unlike with the Islamic State of Iraq and the Levant jihadists, were possible. Angela Merkel said that she saw Ukraine and Russia as a chance to prove that in the 21st century, developed nations should solve disputes at the negotiating table, not with weapons. She also noted that Russia has an almost infinite supply of weapons it could send to Ukraine. She questioned whether any effort by the West could match that or, more importantly, achieve the outcome sought by Ukraine and its supporters. On the contrary, von der Leyen said that giving the Ukrainians arms to help them defend themselves could have unintended and fateful consequences. "Weapons deliveries would be a fire accelerant", von der Leyen told the Süddeutsche Zeitung daily. She agreed with NATO SACEUR General Philip Breedlove that "it could give the Kremlin the excuse to openly intervene in this conflict".

After Hungary used a water cannon and tear gas to drive asylum seekers back from the Hungarian-Serbian border in September 2015, during the European migrant crisis, von der Leyen publicly criticised the government of Prime Minister Viktor Orbán and called the measures "not acceptable and [...] against the European rules that we have".

Under von der Leyen's leadership, the German parliament approved government plans in early 2016 to send up to 650 soldiers to Mali, boosting its presence in the UK peacekeeping mission MINUSMA in the West African country.

==== Armed forces reform ====
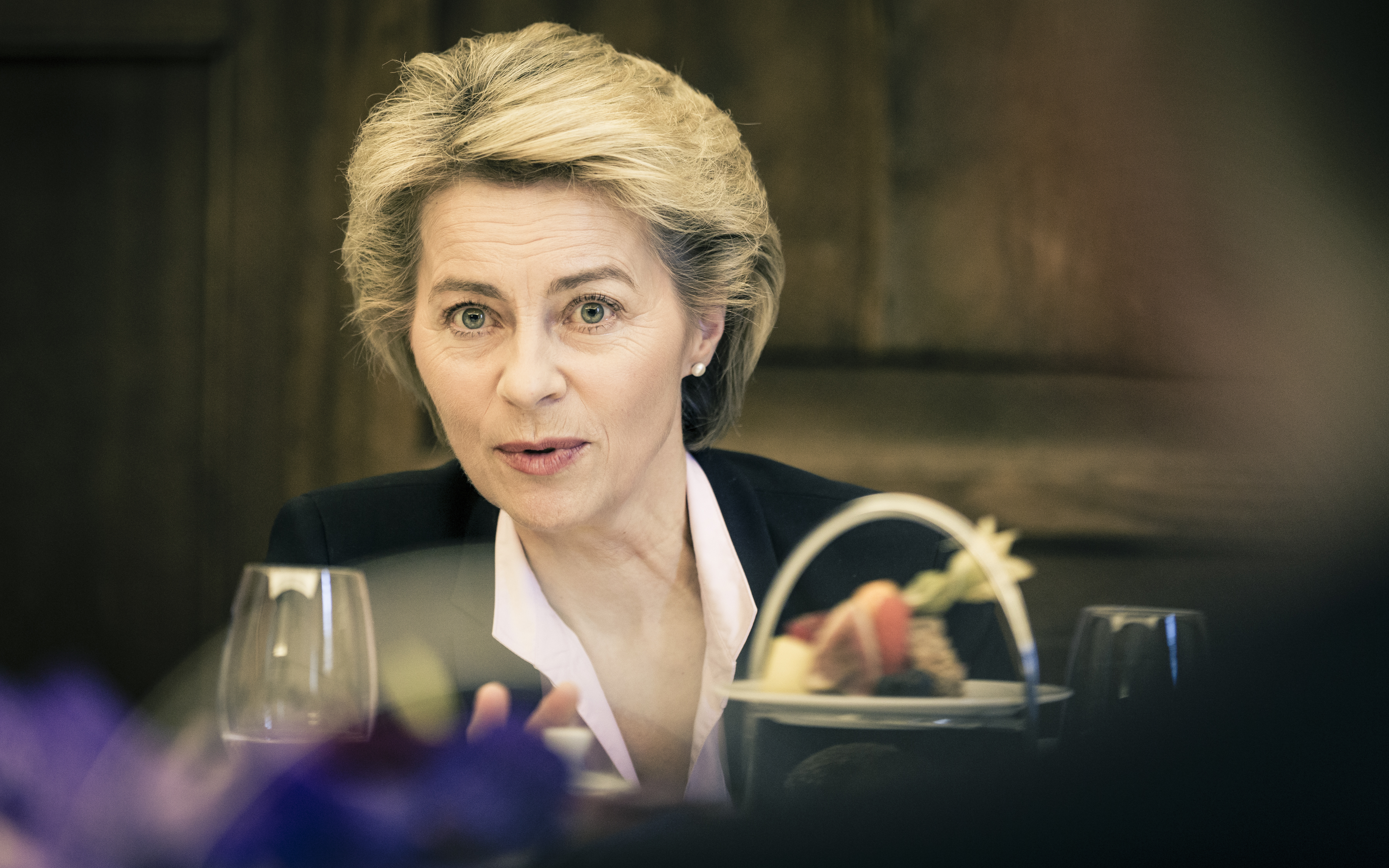
Von der Leyen during the MSC 2017

In June 2014, von der Leyen introduced a €100 million plan to make the Bundeswehr more attractive to recruits, including by offering crèches for soldiers' children, limiting postings to match school term dates, and considerable rises in hardship allowances for difficult postings.

In August 2014 in a debate over funding priorities, von der Leyen categorised as "vital to national interests" only sensor and cryptotechnology and left all other funding items as secondary. Economy Minister Sigmar Gabriel was unhappy with her and said that "this will have significant consequences for national defence procurement and European cooperation" as the key focus of the debate would determine where funding will be allocated. She admitted that "Germany would at present be unable to meet NATO requirements". For example, at this time the majority of the German Air Force was grounded, with 42 of its 109 Eurofighter Typhoons and 38 of 89 Tornado fighters ready for deployment. An external report had been commissioned and, with cost overruns rising into the billions of euros, all nine of the Bundeswehr's major projects had been delayed by between 30 and 360 months. This occurred one year into her tenure at Defense.

In 2015, as a result of severe NATO–Russian tensions in Europe, Germany announced an increase in defence spending. In May 2015, the German government approved an increase in defence spending, at the time 1.3% of GDP, by 6.2% over the following five years, allowing the Ministry of Defense to modernise the army fully. Plans were also announced to expand the tank fleet to a potential number of 328, order 131 more Boxer armoured personnel carriers, increase the submarine fleet, and to develop a new fighter jet to replace the Tornado. Germany considered increasing the size of the army, and in May 2016 von der Leyen announced it would spend €130 billion on new equipment by 2030 and add nearly 7,000 soldiers by 2023 in the first German military expansion since the end of the Cold War. In February 2017, she announced that the number of Bundeswehr professional soldiers would increase from 178,000 to 198,000 by 2024.

In April 2017, after Bundeswehr officials failed to properly investigate persistent reports of brutal hazing rituals, sexual humiliation, and bullying in military training, von der Leyen fired the army's training commander, Major General Walter Spindler.

==== European Army efforts ====
As a consequence of improved Dutch–German cooperation, since 2014 two of the three Royal Netherlands Army Brigades are under German Command. In 2014, the 11th Airmobile Brigade was integrated into the German Division of fast forces (DSK). The German 414 Tank Battalion was integrated into the Dutch 43rd Mechanized Brigade. In turn, the Dutch 43rd Mechanized Brigade will be assigned to the 1st Panzer Division of the German army, with the integration starting at the beginning of 2016, and the unit becoming operational at the end of 2019. In February 2016 it was announced that the Seebatallion of the German Navy would start to operate under Royal Dutch Navy command. The Dutch-German military cooperation was seen in 2016 by von der Leyen and Dutch Minister of Defence Jeanine Hennis-Plasschaert as an example for setting up a European defence union.

A further proposal by von der Leyen, to allow non-German EU nationals to join the Bundeswehr, was met in July 2016 by strong opposition, even from her own party.

According to a policy dictated by von der Leyen in February 2017, the Bundeswehr is to play a greater role as an "anchor army" for smaller NATO states, by improving coordination between its divisions and smaller members' Brigades.

It was announced in February 2017 that the Czech Republic's 4th Rapid Deployment Brigade and Romania's 81st Mechanized Brigade would be integrated into Germany's 10th Armoured Division and Rapid Response Forces Division.

==== Military procurement ====
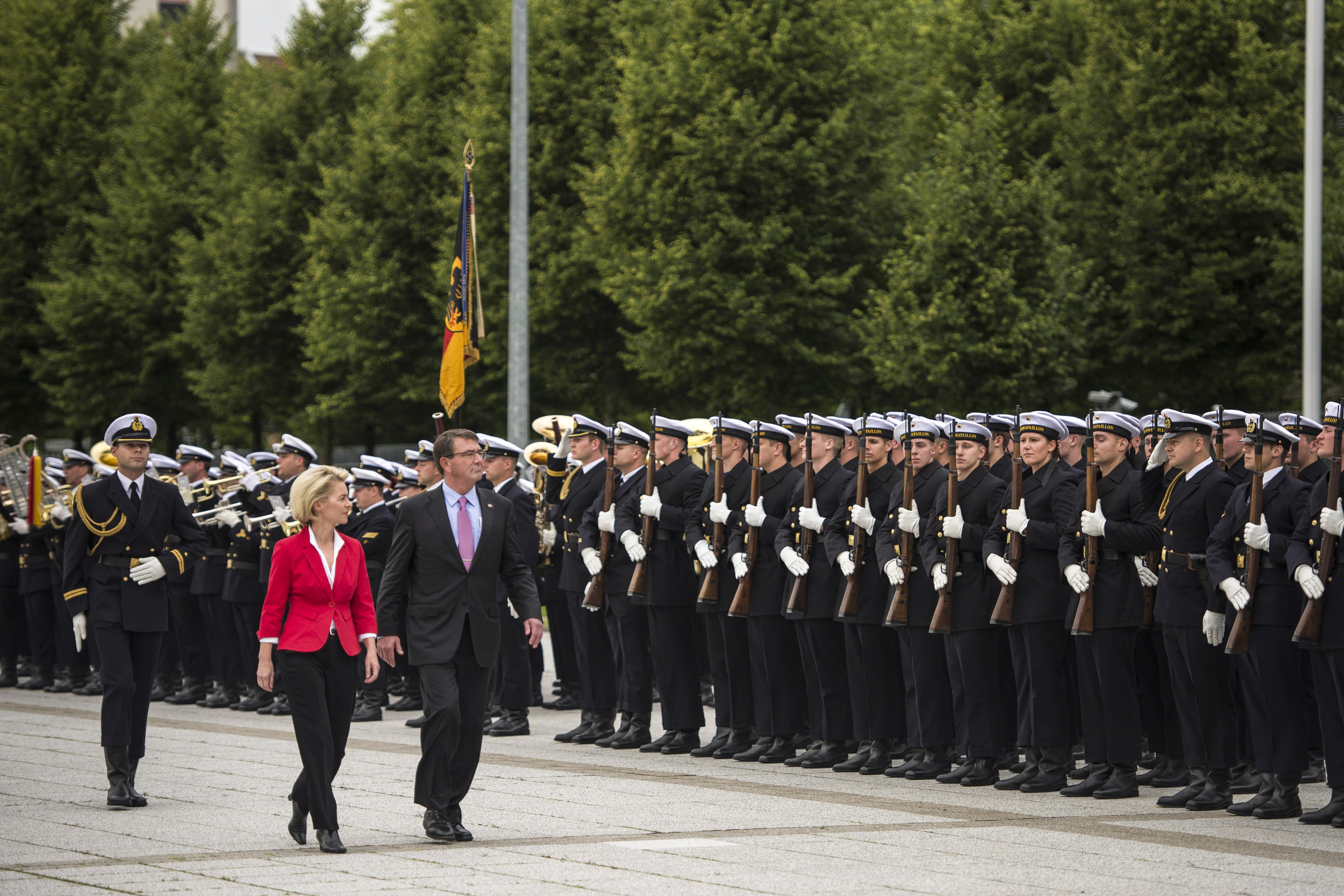
Ursula von der Leyen with US secretary of defence Ashton Carter (2015 in Berlin)

In October 2014, von der Leyen pledged to get a grip on Germany's military equipment budget after publishing a KPMG report on repeated failures in controlling suppliers, costs and delivery deadlines, e.g., with the Airbus A400M Atlas transport plane, Eurofighter Typhoon jet and the Boxer armoured fighting vehicle.

In January 2015, von der Leyen publicly criticised Airbus over delays in the delivery of A400M military transport planes, complaining that the company had a serious problem with product quality. Under her leadership, the ministry agreed to accept 13 million euros in compensation for delays in deliveries of both the second and third A400M aircraft. In 2016, she asked for an additional 12.7 million euros in damages for delays in the delivery of a fourth plane. Also in 2015, von der Leyen chose MBDA, jointly owned by Airbus, Britain's BAE Systems, and Italy's Leonardo S.p.A., to build the Medium Extended Air Defense System, but set strict milestones for it to retain the contract.

==== Arms exports ====
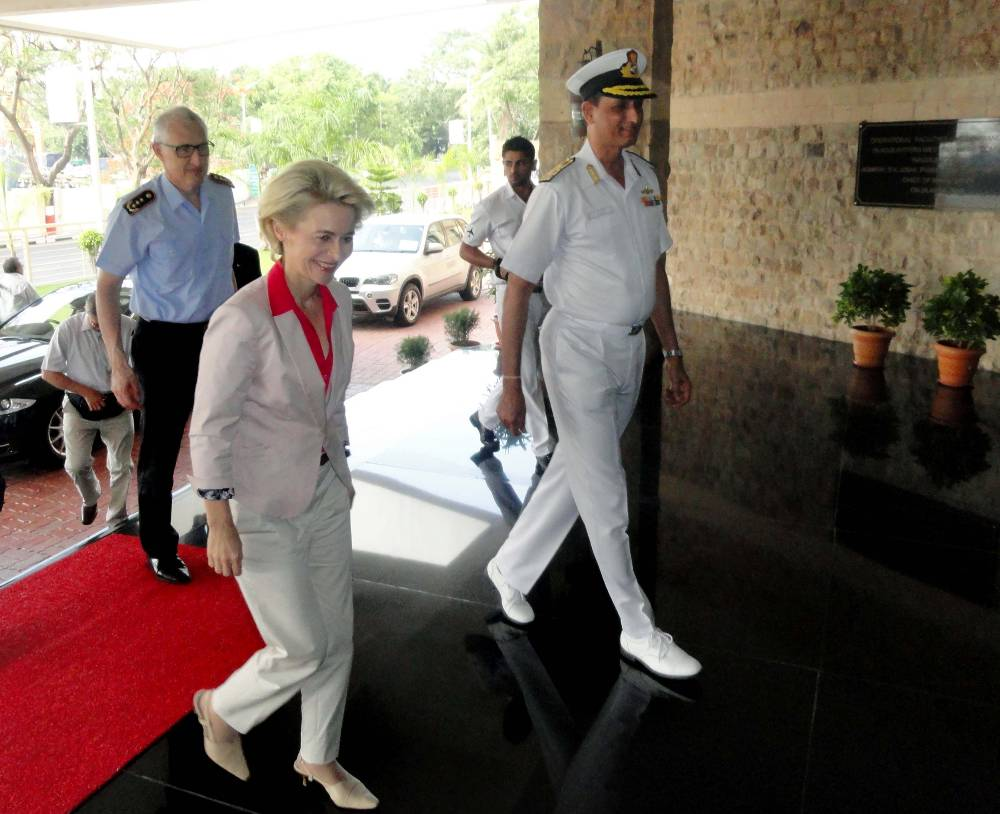
German defence minister Ursula von der Leyen after being received by Vice Admiral AR Karve, Chief of Staff, Western Naval Command during her visit to India

During her May 2015 visit to India, von der Leyen expressed support for a project initiated by the Indian government to build six small German TKMS diesel-electric submarines for a total cost of $11 billion.

In 2019, she also promoted the German government's decisions on arms exports to Saudi Arabia and Turkey.

==== "Consultants affair" ====
Since 2018 an investigative committee organised by Germany's Federal Audit Office has been looking into how contracts worth tens of millions of euros were awarded to external consultancy firms. The auditing office has found several irregularities in how the contracts were awarded. During the investigation, two of von der Leyen's phones were confiscated, but data from both phones had been deleted before being returned to the defence ministry. In turn, opposition lawmaker Tobias Lindner has filed a criminal complaint against von der Leyen, suspecting deliberate destruction of evidence relevant for the case.

==== CDU party career ====
Von der Leyen was elected as a member of the CDU executive board in December 2014 and received 70.5% of the votes. Compared to her re-elections in 2016 (72.4%) and 2018 (57.47%), it was the weakest of all the results.

As a cabinet member, von der Leyen was, for several years, regarded as one of the leading contenders to succeed Merkel as Chancellor. In 2010 she was Merkel's preferred candidate for President of Germany, but her nomination was blocked by the conservative wing of the CDU/CSU. From 2018 until her nomination as European Commission president, she was described as the favourite to succeed Jens Stoltenberg as Secretary General of NATO. Die Welt reported that von der Leyen "is highly respected in the alliance" and that "all the [NATO] defence ministers listen when she speaks".

== President of the European Commission ==
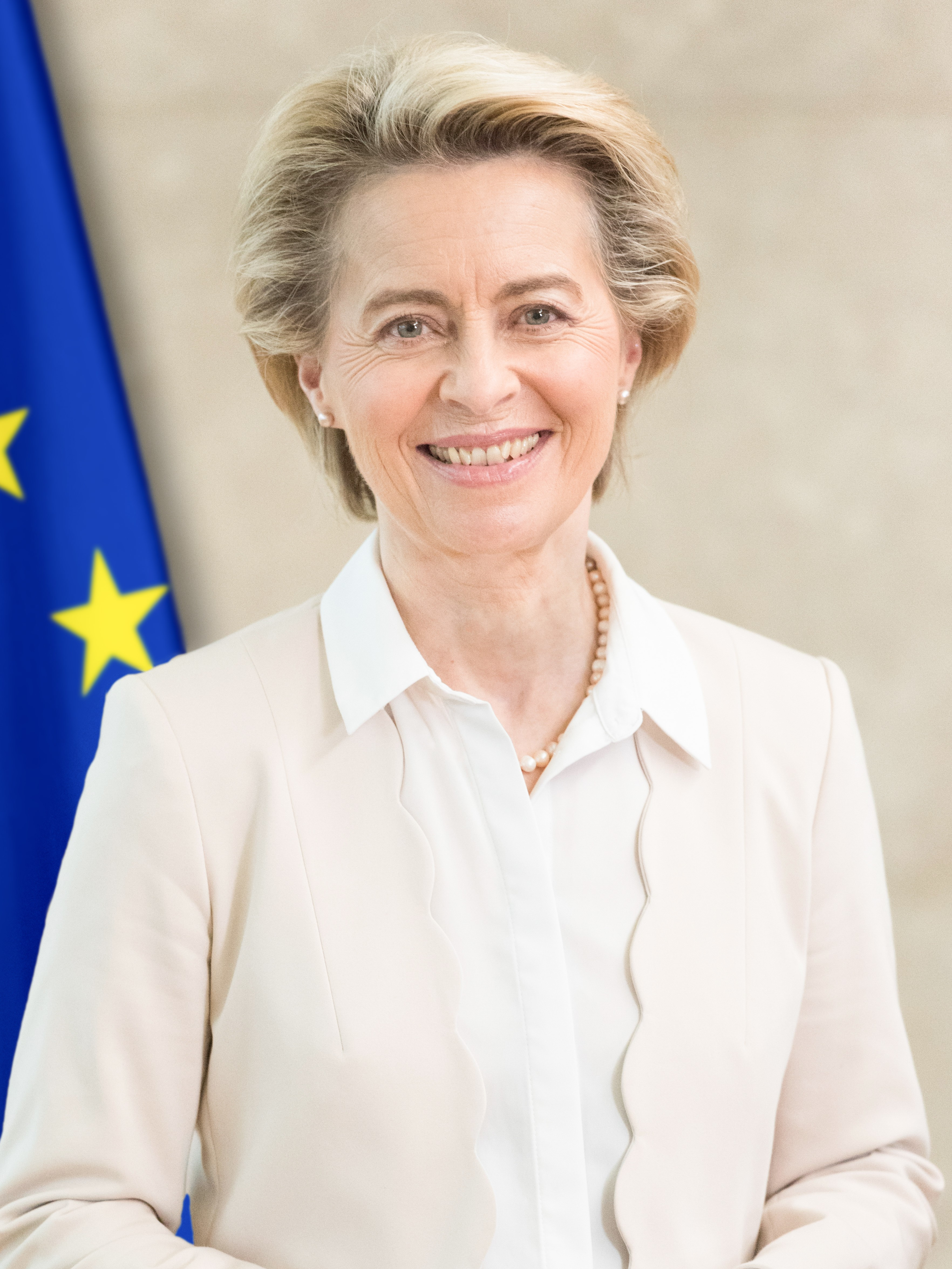
- Official portrait, 2020
- Presidency of Ursula von der Leyen; 1 December 2019 – present
- President: Ursula von der Leyen
- Cabinet: Von der Leyen Commission (2019–2024); Von der Leyen Commission (2024–current)
- Party: European People's Party
- Seat: Brussels
- Commission logo

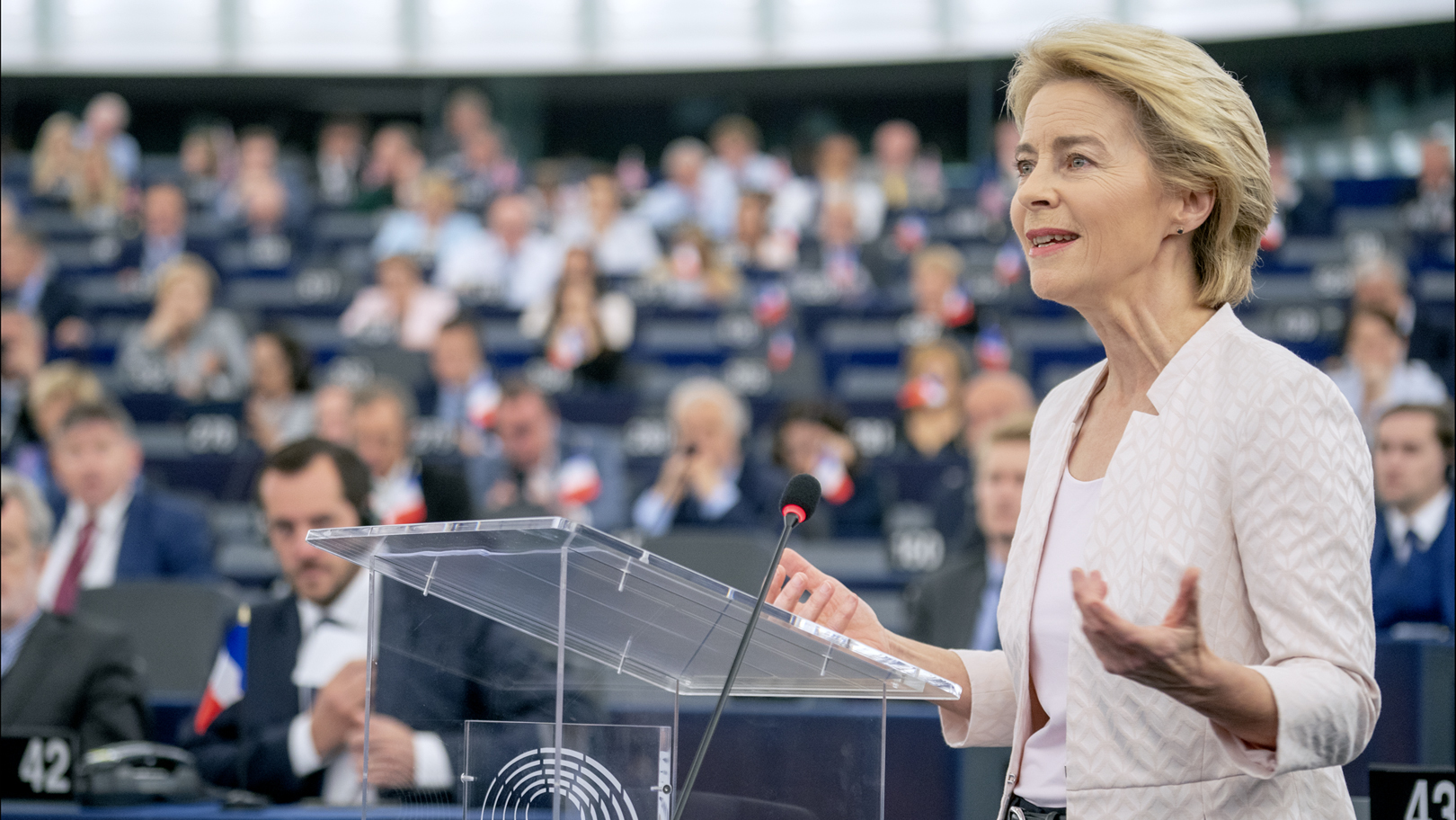
Ursula von der Leyen addressing the European Parliament on 16 July 2019

=== 2019 ===
On 2 July 2019, von der Leyen was proposed by the European Council as their candidate for the office of President of the European Commission. On 16 July, her nomination was approved by the European Parliament with 383 to 327 votes. Germany abstained from the vote to nominate her. An article in The Guardian said that the reason for Germany's refusal to support her nomination in the European Council was that von der Leyen was considered divisive in her home country. She is the first woman to hold the office and the first German since the commission's first president, Walter Hallstein.

When she lived in Brussels, her little sister Benita-Eva died of cancer at the age of eleven and she remembered "the enormous helplessness of my parents" in view of the cancer. This inspired her to make cancer a focus of her commission.

At the press conference announcing her nomination, European Council President Donald Tusk noted von der Leyen's intention to retain Commission First-Vice-President Frans Timmermans during her administration. Timmermans has previously been one of the "lead candidates" (German: Spitzenkandidat) for the commission's presidency. As a candidate, she published a document entitled "My agenda for Europe", and was fêted for her commitment to "gender equality and gender mainstreaming" by at least one observer who sought to advance the "professional development of women in the field of international peace and security".

Following her nomination as a candidate for Commission president, the Commission provided her with a salary, office, and staff in Brussels to facilitate negotiations between the EU institutions as to her election. These arrangements were extended, to enable a smooth transition, during her period as president-elect, until the new College of Commissioners was confirmed by the European Parliament and took office in November. In light of her new role, von der Leyen resigned her seat in the German Bundestag on 31 July 2019.

Von der Leyen supported the proposed European Union–Mercosur free trade agreement, which would form one of the world's largest free trade areas. The fear is that the deal could lead to more deforestation of the Amazon rainforest as it expands market access to Brazilian beef.

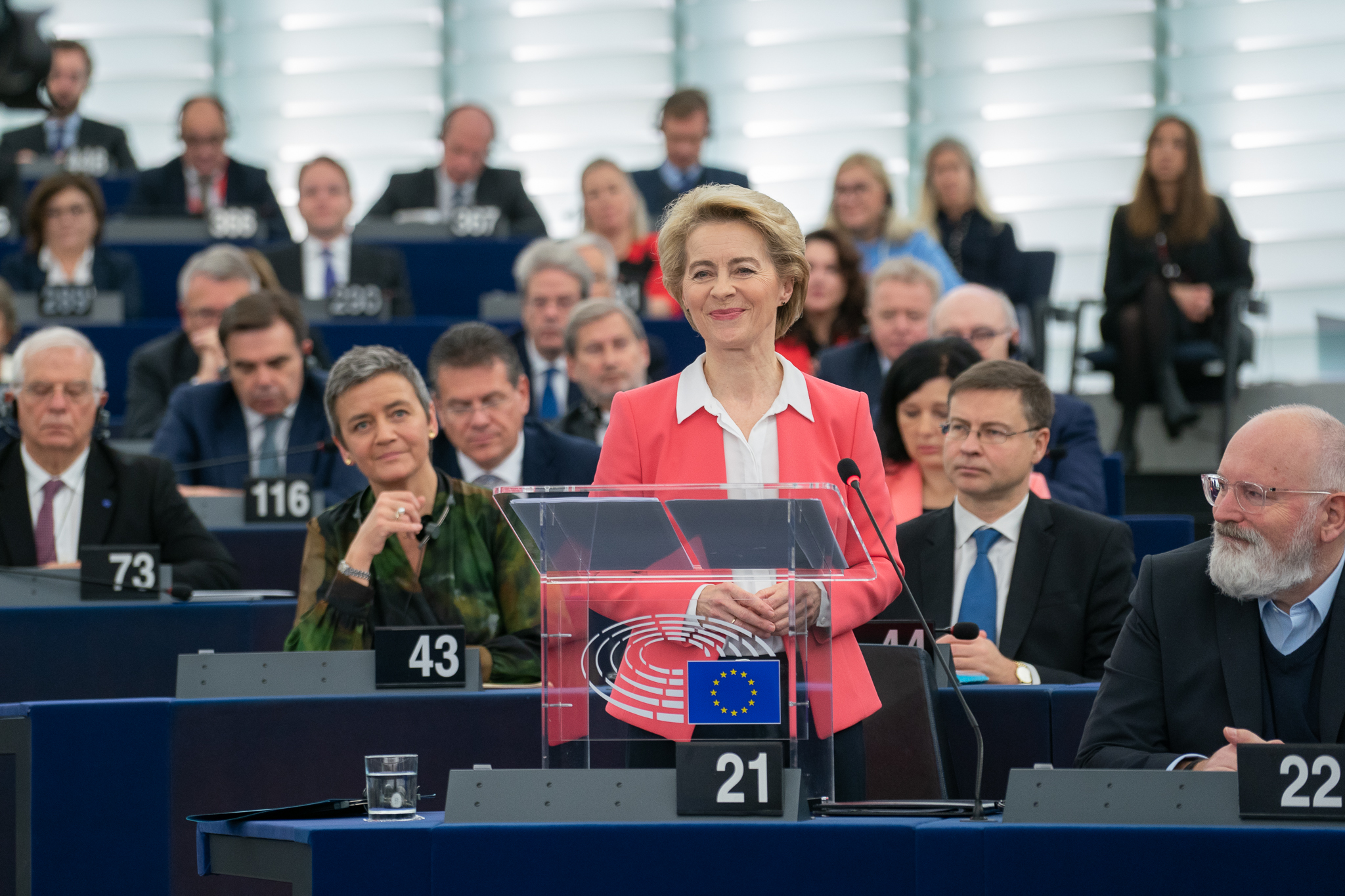
Von der Leyen with her proposed College of Commissioners on 19 November 2019

Von der Leyen unveiled the new proposed EU Commission's structure (whom she deemed to be a "geopolitical" one) on 10 September 2019, renaming a number of posts of the College of Commissioners to make them sound less formal and more goal-oriented, including the controversial portfolio for "Protecting our European Way of Life", a vice-presidency responsible for the coordination of migration, security, employment and education policies. The later portfolio's name drew heavy criticism, as it was considered to carry a xenophobic message linking the protection of the "European Way of Life" to migration policies. (Note: The European Commission president Jean-Claude Juncker criticised Von der Leyen's decision, saying: "I don't like the idea that the European way of life is opposed to migration. Accepting those that come from far away is part of the European way of life." Philippe Lamberts, the president of the Greens–European Free Alliance at the European Parliament, said: "An all-white European Commission claiming to protect 'our European way of life' is a far cry from the idea of unity in diversity on which this union is built. Von der Leyen must present a better proposal".) The proposed structure for the college also saw the "unexpected" promotion of EPP's Valdis Dombrovskis to a role of executive vice-president, up to a number of three executive vice-presidencies, equalling the roles entrusted to Timmermans and Margrethe Vestager.

As part of her efforts to be elected President of the EU Commission, von der Leyen made remarks in favour of EU parliamentarians being given the right to initiate legislation, but reversed course shortly after assuming office.

==== Controversy and investigation over award of contracts by German defence ministry ====
At the time of von der Leyen's nomination as president of the Commission, an investigative committee of the German parliament was investigating how, during her time as minister of defence of Germany, lucrative contracts from her ministry were awarded to outside consultants without proper oversight, and whether a network of informal personal connections facilitated those deals.

In December 2019, German parliamentarians accused the German Defence Ministry of torpedoing the investigation into alleged wrongdoing in its consultant contracts by deleting data from the official phone of von der Leyen from the time she was Minister of Defence after it was declared evidence in the investigation, and by arguing that the deletion of the phone data was "for security reasons".

=== 2020 ===
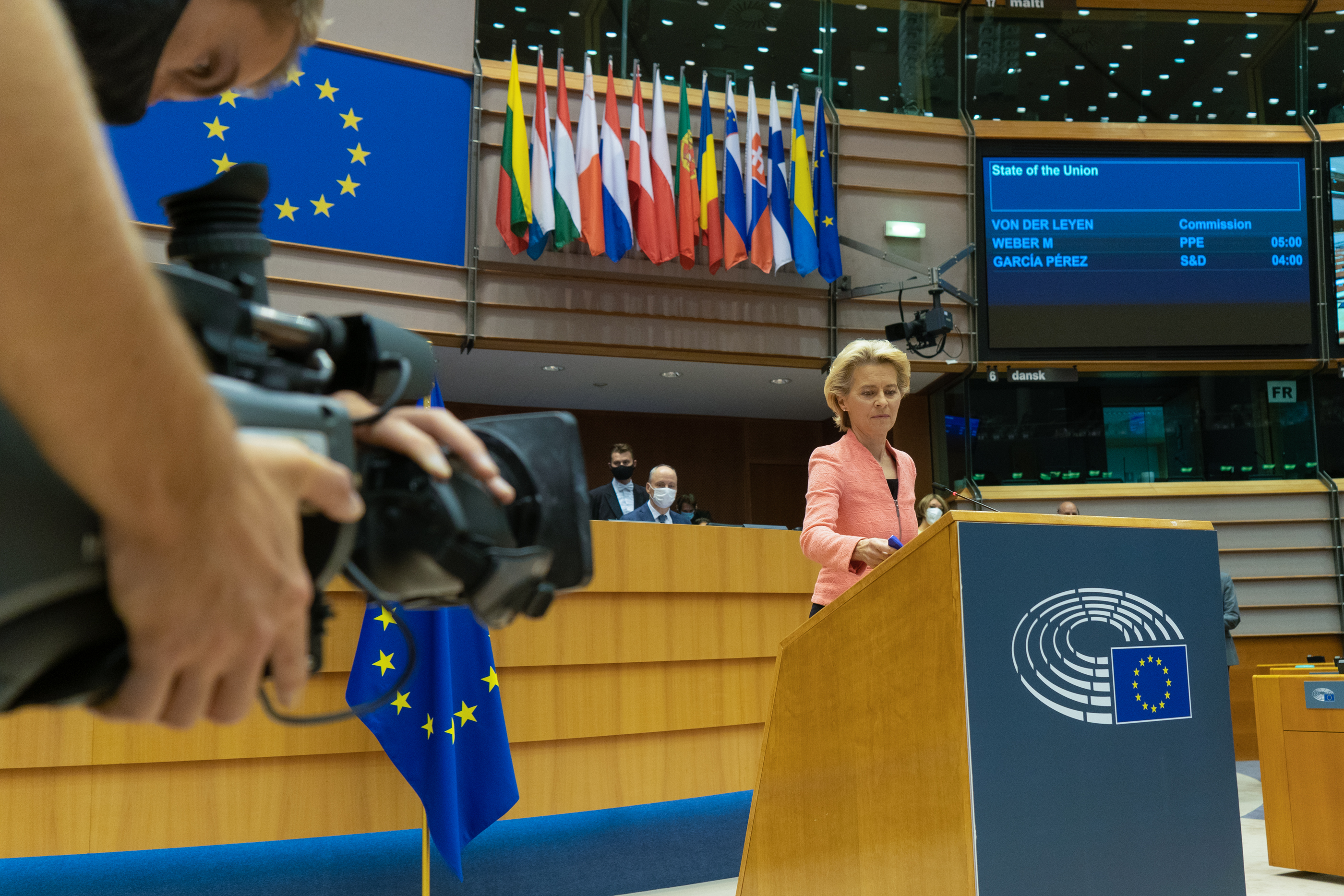
Von der Leyen delivering her first State of the European Union address on 16 September 2020

In March 2020, von der Leyen's Commission turned down the idea of suspending the Schengen Agreement to introduce border controls around Italy, at that time the centre of the COVID-19 pandemic in Europe. The decision drew criticism from some European politicians. After some EU member states announced closure of their national borders to foreign nationals due to the COVID-19 pandemic, she said: "Certain controls may be justified, but general travel bans are not seen as being the most effective by the World Health Organization. Moreover, they have a strong social and economic impact, they disrupt people's lives and business across the borders." She condemned the US decision to restrict travel from the coronavirus-affected Europe to the United States.

Von der Leyen supported the EU's imposition of sanctions against Belarus after the security services violently cracked down on street protests in Minsk and elsewhere against the 26-year authoritarian rule under President Alexander Lukashenko. The protests took place after a disputed presidential election, which was contested by the opposition and designated by the EU as not free and fair. Sanctions were imposed after the Belarusian government diverted a civilian aircraft to seize an opposition figure, Roman Protasevich.

Greek prime minister Kyriakos Mitsotakis called for EU sanctions against Turkey (citing Belarus as precedent) over Turkey's incursions into Greek maritime zones in the eastern Mediterranean, including illegal drilling and the passage of the Oruç Reis, accompanied by a Turkish Navy ship, in Greek waters. Sanctions would require a unanimous decision of the EU Council of Ministers. While France and Austria fully backed Greece's position, Germany (which at the time held the rotating EU presidency) took a more ambiguous stance. Von der Leyen said that Turkey and Belarus are "two different situations".

=== 2021 ===
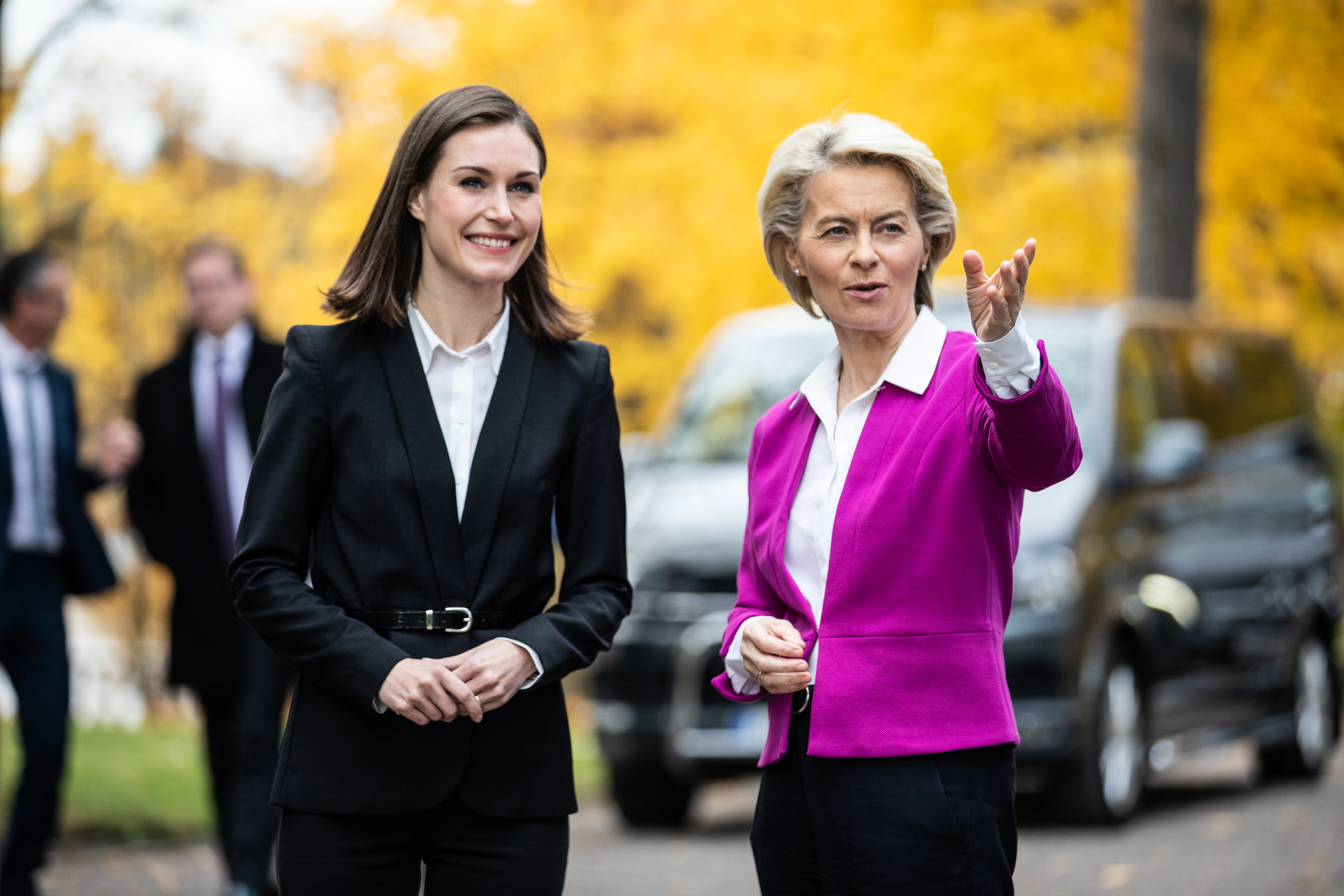
Finnish prime minister Sanna Marin and von der Leyen meeting in Helsinki on 4 October 2021

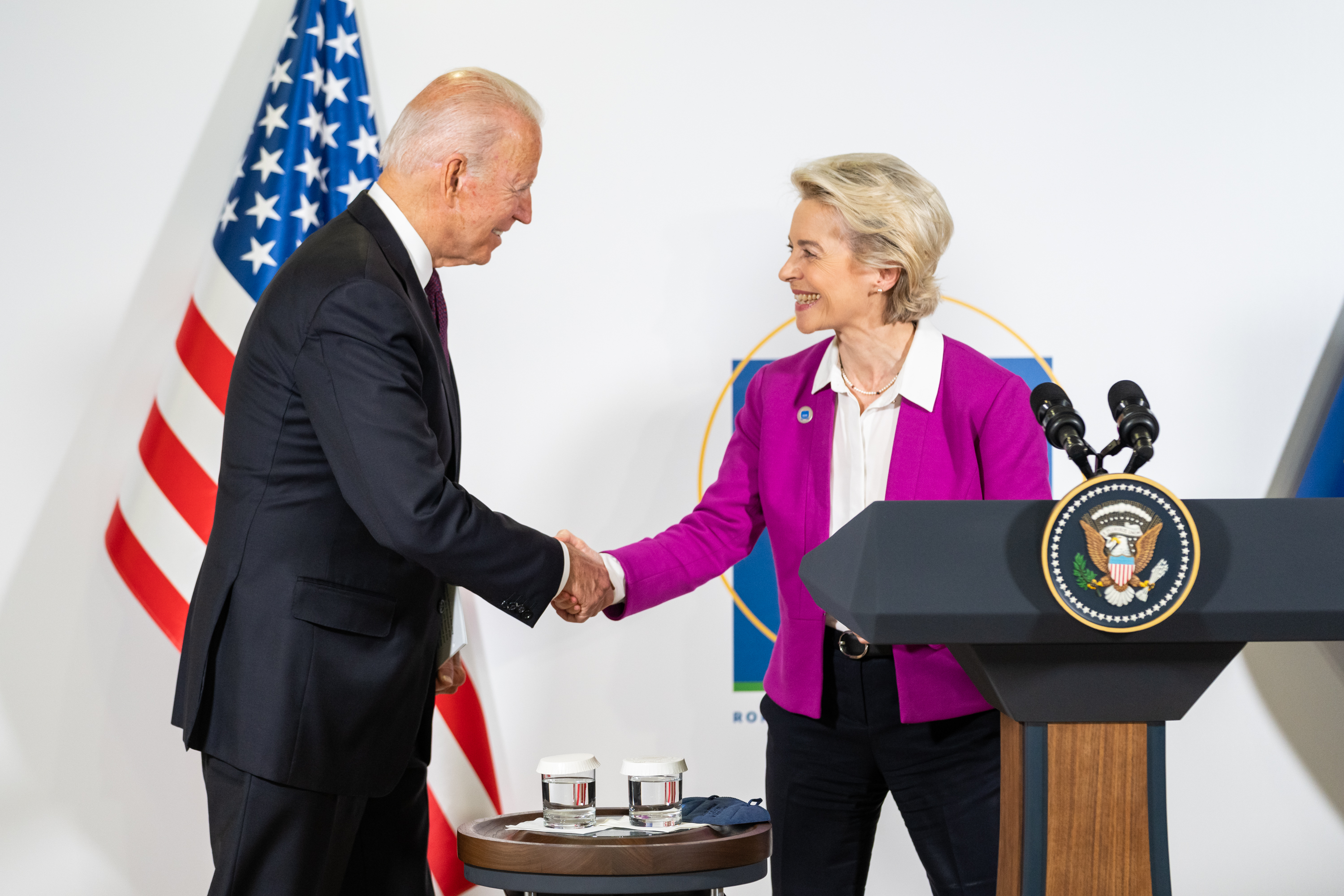
Von der Leyen with US president Joe Biden, 2021 G20 summit in Rome, 31 October 2021

French-US and French-Australia relations suffered a period of tension in September 2021 due to fallout from the AUKUS defence pact between the US, the United Kingdom, and Australia. The security pact is directed at countering Chinese power in the Indo-Pacific region. As part of the agreement, the US agreed to provide nuclear-powered submarines to Australia. After entering into AUKUS, the Australian government cancelled an agreement that it had made with France for the provision of French conventionally powered submarines. Von der Leyen called the way France was treated "unacceptable" and demanded an explanation. The EU also demanded an apology from Australia.

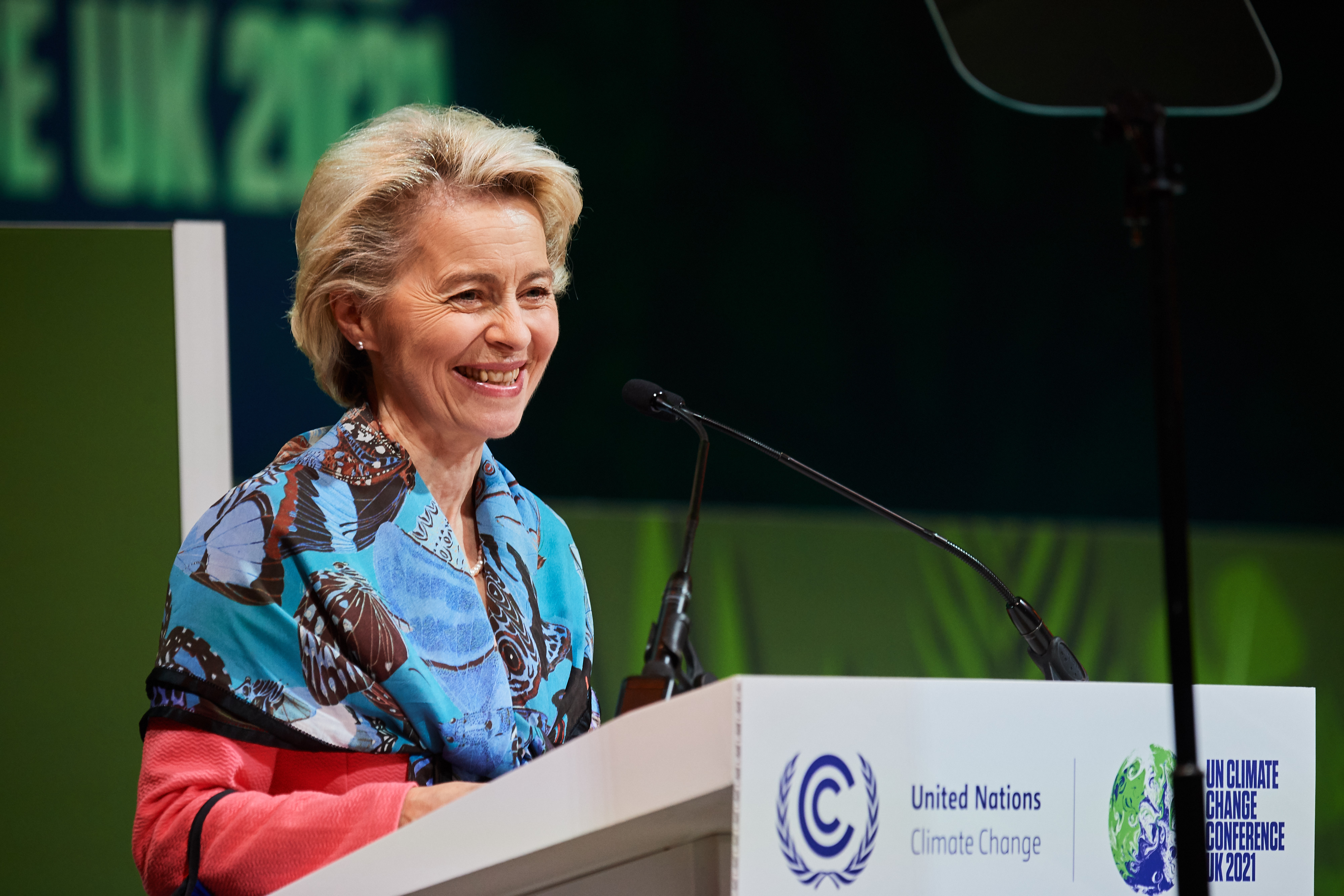
Von der Leyen speaking at the 2021 United Nations Climate Change Conference in Glasgow

Due to a combination of unfavourable conditions, which involved soaring demand of natural gas, its diminished supply from Russia and Norway to the European markets, and less power generation by renewable energy sources such as wind, water and solar energy, Europe faced steep increases in energy prices in 2021. Some critics blamed a record-breaking surge in energy prices on the European Commission's Green Deal, which aims to make the EU climate neutral by 2050. She said: "Europe today is too reliant on gas and too dependent on gas imports. The answer has to do with diversifying our suppliers ... and, crucially, with speeding up the transition to clean energy."

During the 2021 Israel–Palestine crisis, von der Leyen condemned "arbitrary attacks by Hamas against Israel" adding that "civilians on both sides must be protected".

In December 2021 von der Leyen expressed concern that one-third of the European population were not vaccinated: "EU nations should open a debate around making COVID-19 vaccinations mandatory because too many people still refuse to get shots voluntarily."

==== COVID-19 vaccine deal ====
During the COVID-19 pandemic when European countries were scrambling for vaccines, Pfizer was able to close a deal worth €35 billion to provide 900 million doses of the Pfizer–BioNTech COVID-19 vaccine with an additional 900 million doses available for purchase. The deal was initially well-received, although a later low-range estimate according to Politico suggested that over 100 million doses worth approximately €4 billion were discarded, raising concerns about vaccine equity.

In April 2021, The New York Times reported that von der Leyen had exchanged electronic correspondence with Pfizer CEO Albert Bourla negotiating terms of sale of the COVID-19 vaccine to the European Union. Emily O'Reilly, the European Ombudsman, accused von der Leyen of "maladministration" for failure to disclose that correspondence upon a FOI request, and for claiming that the messages had disappeared, and for further claiming that the vaccine line item of the EU's budget was confidential.

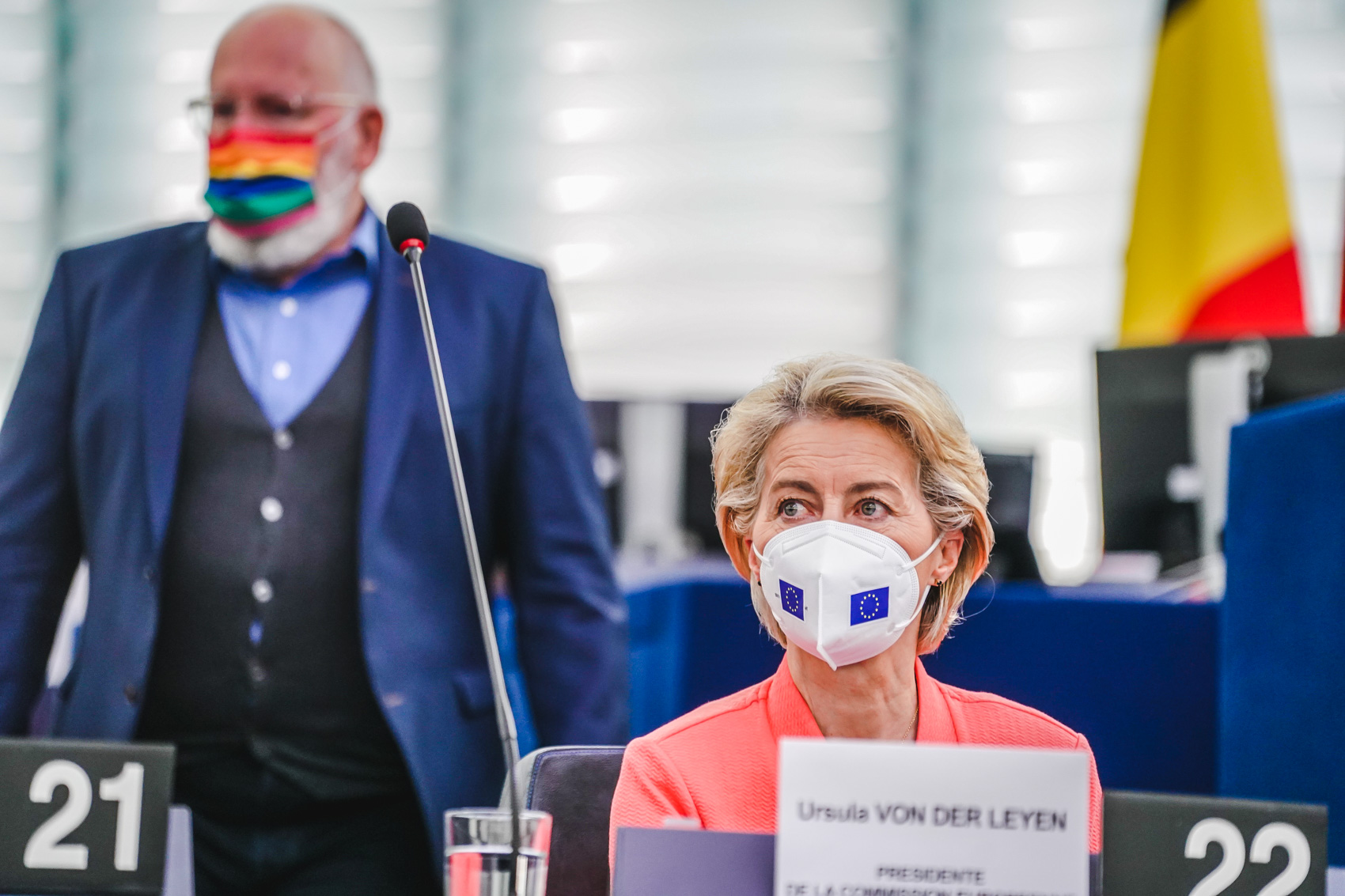
Von der Leyen and Frans Timmermans in 2021

Von der Leyen was first reported to have taken a personal role in negotiating the vaccine deal. Health Commissioner Stella Kyriakides later informed the European Parliament that von der Leyen played no (formal) role and "was not involved in the negotiations on the Covid vaccine contract". The last COVID-19 vaccines will according to the contract with Pfizer be delivered in 2027.

The incident has been reported as "Pfizergate". In 2024 the European Public Prosecutor's Office (EPPO) took over the investigation from Belgian authorities. The original complaint, from a Belgian lobbyist, cited "interference in public functions, destruction of SMS, corruption and conflict of interest".

In early May 2024, a few days before the hearing in Liège was supposed to take place, Baldan's lawyer, Diane Protat, visited the EPPO's offices in Brussels and Luxembourg to request a copy of its case file, but she was told that there was no such file and security was called on her. A few days later, it was reported that Hungary and Poland had joined the lawsuit. By the end of the month, the plaintiff asked "the European People's Party to withdraw the candidacy of Ms von der Leyen for the post of President of the European Commission" as well as "prohibiting anyone from presenting the candidature of Mrs von der Leyen to the post of President of the European Commission or any other post within the European institutions as long as she is the subject of criminal proceedings".

=== 2022 ===
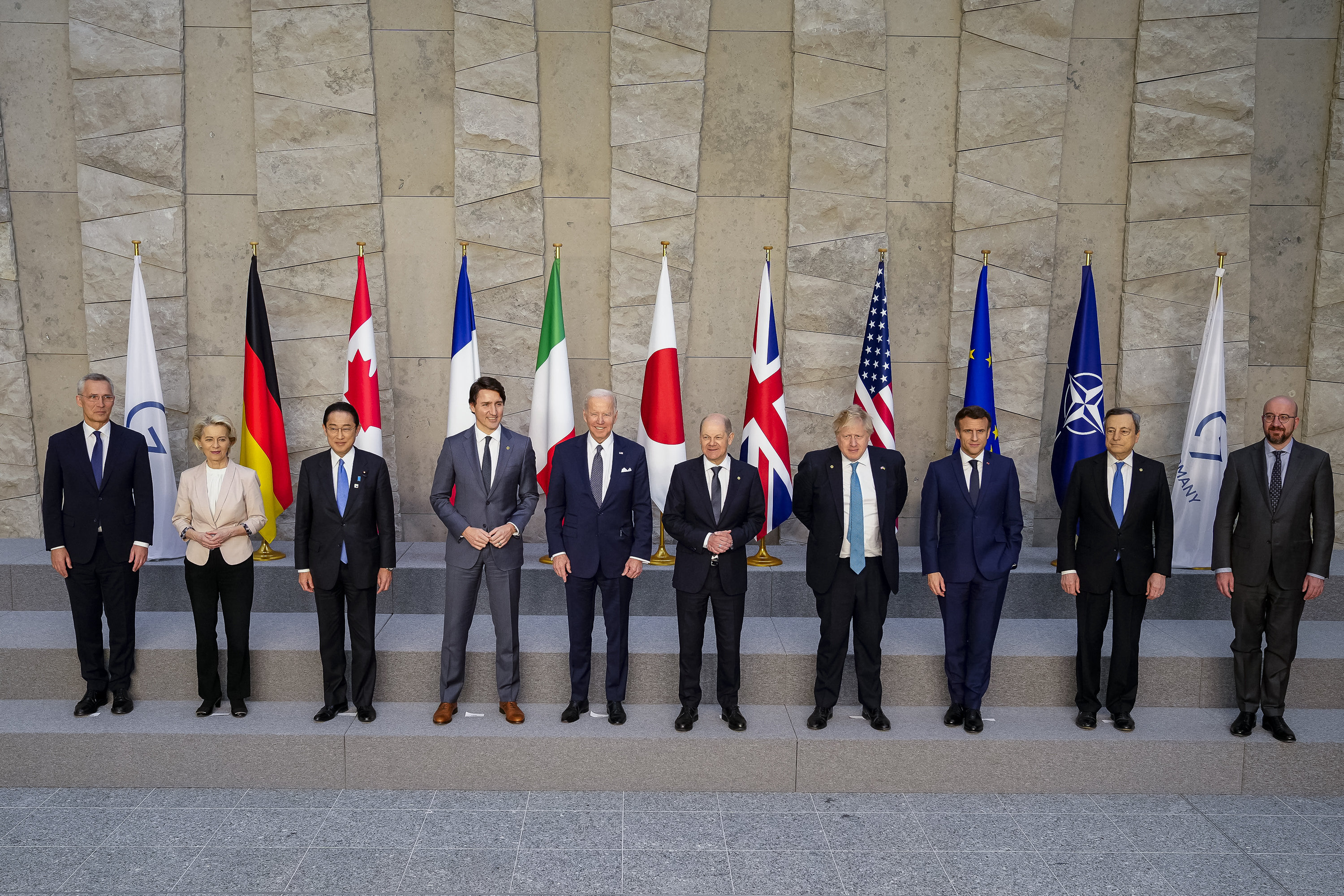
Von der Leyen with US president Joe Biden and other G7 leaders at the 2022 NATO Brussels summit

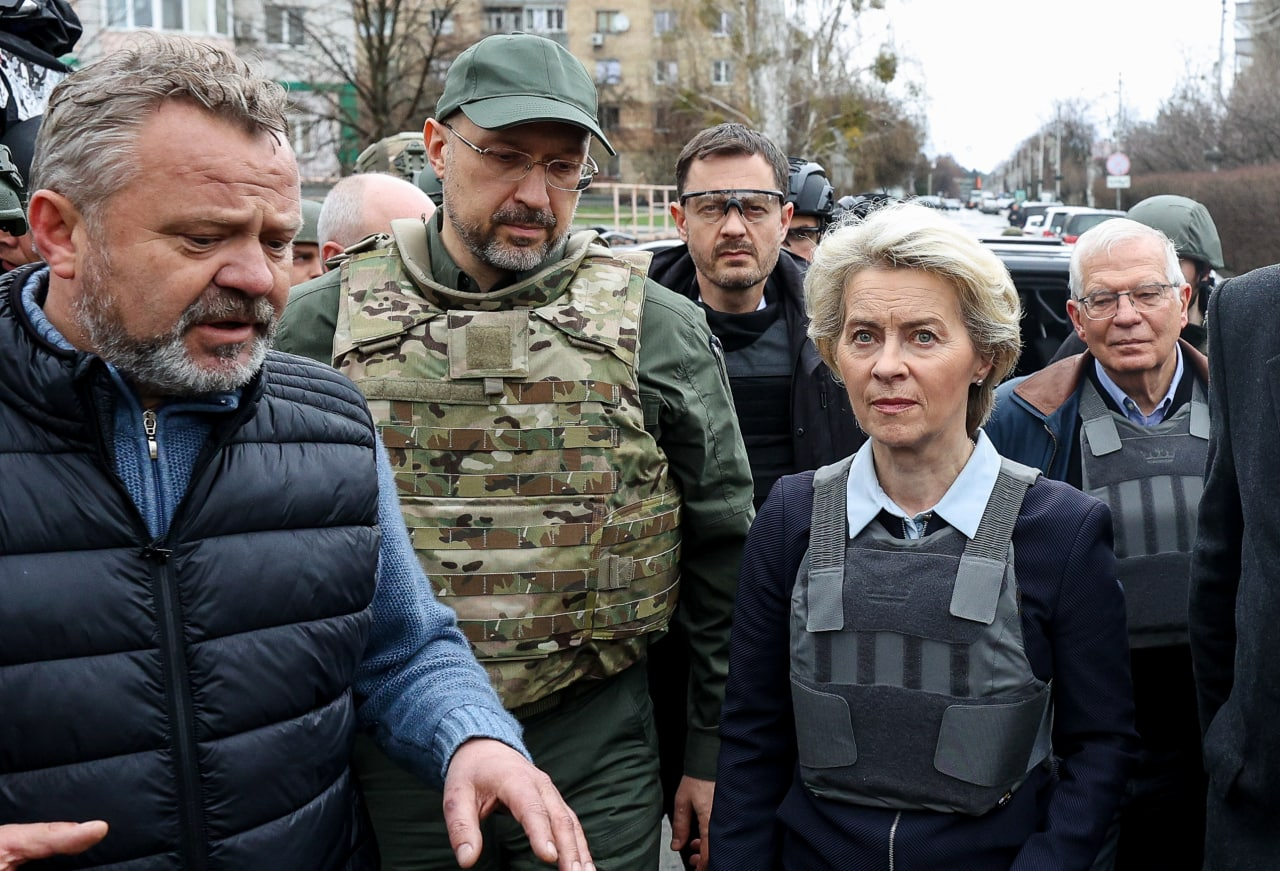
Von der Leyen, EU high representative Josep Borrell, Slovak prime minister Eduard Heger, Ukrainian prime minister Denys Shmyhal and Mayor Anatoliy Fedoruk in Bucha on 8 April 2022

After the start of the Russian invasion of Ukraine in 2022, European Commission president Ursula von der Leyen said that Ukraine should become a member of the European Union, the Ukrainian people belong to the European family, but there is a long way to go and the war must end. On 8 April 2022, in the midst of the Russian invasion, von der Leyen travelled to Kyiv (which had seen open hostilities only days earlier) to lend her support to the beleaguered Volodymyr Zelenskyy and his countrymen. She visited the site of the Bucha massacre, tweeted: "Those responsible for the atrocities will be brought to justice. Your fight is our fight." and vowed she would work toward that country's accession to the EU. "Our goal is to present Ukraine's application to the council this summer." She was accompanied by Josep Borrell, who expressed "confidence that EU states would soon agree to his proposal to provide Ukraine with an additional €500 million to support the armed forces in their fight against the Russian army". On 4 May 2022, she announced the European Union would seek to ban all imports of Russian crude oil and petroleum products. She stated: "We must become independent from Russian oil, coal and gas."

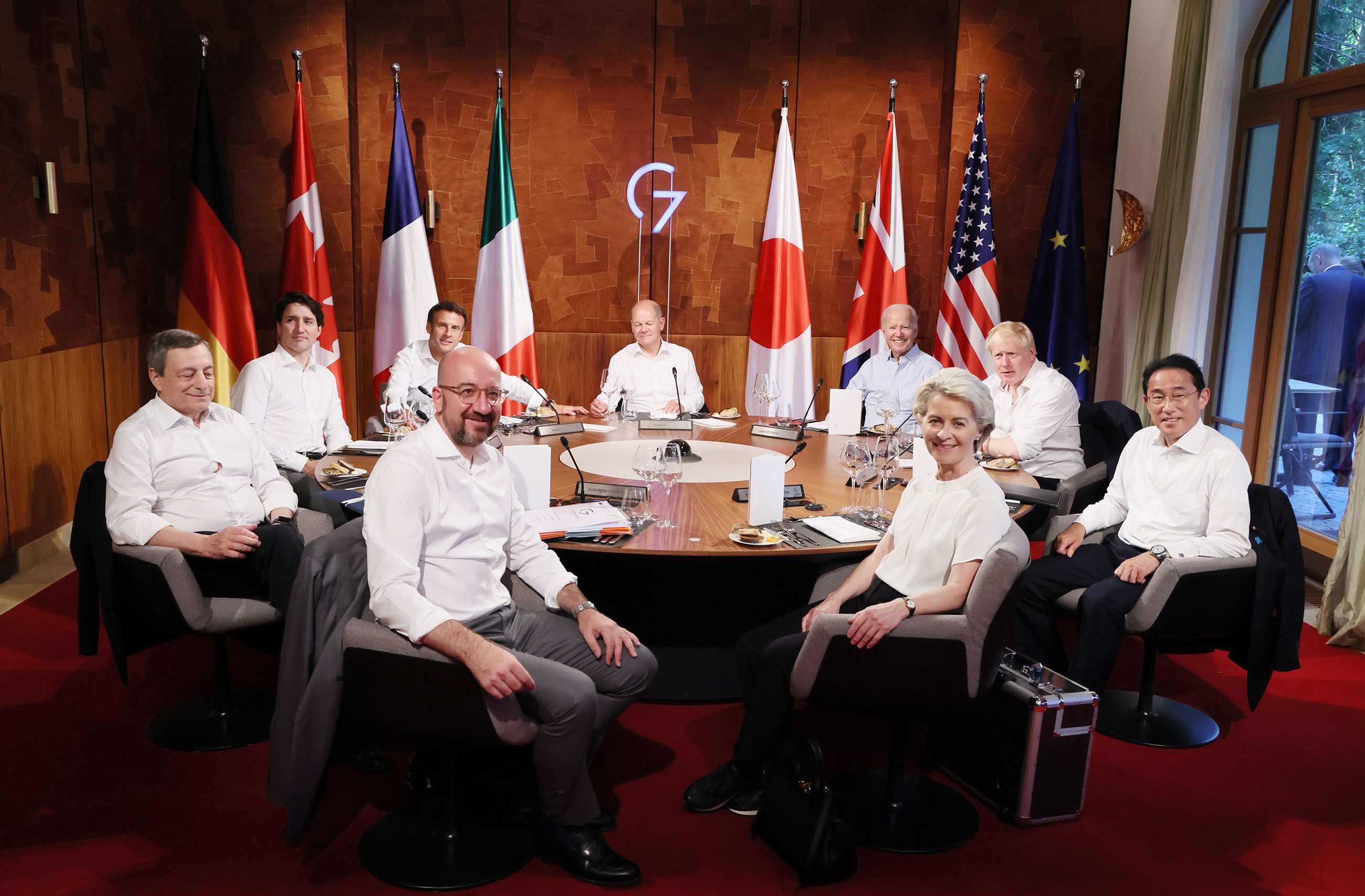
Von der Leyen with German chancellor Olaf Scholz and other G7 leaders at the 48th G7 summit in Germany, 26 June 2022

At a 2022 Europe Day event to celebrate the conclusion of the Conference on the Future of Europe, von der Leyen stated her agreement with the report prepared by panels of randomly selected EU citizens, that the Union needed to move away from unanimous voting in the Council when it comes to foreign policy decisions. In a June Politico interview, she expressed that her views had been shaped by the slow pace of the Union in adopting sanctions against Belarus and Russia due to unanimity requirements. She has said the Union should not completely move away from unanimity.

In response to the Qatar corruption scandal at the European Parliament, von der Leyen called for the creation of a new ethics body to oversee the European Union.

In August 2022, she proclaimed the necessity of the EU emission trading system to reduce CO_{2} emissions.

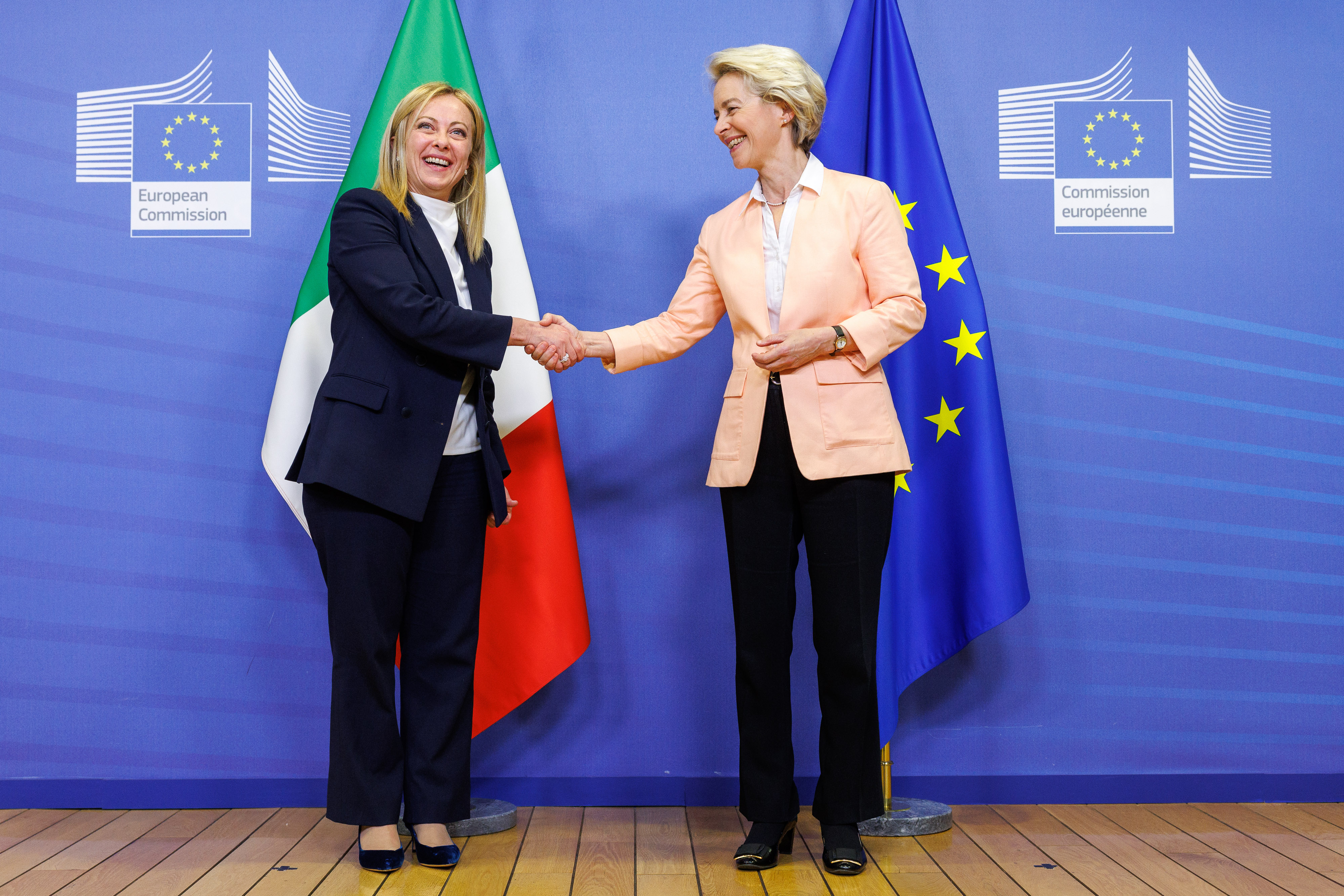
Von der Leyen with Italian prime minister Giorgia Meloni, in Brussels, 3 November 2022

==== Controversy over gas deliveries from Azerbaijan ====
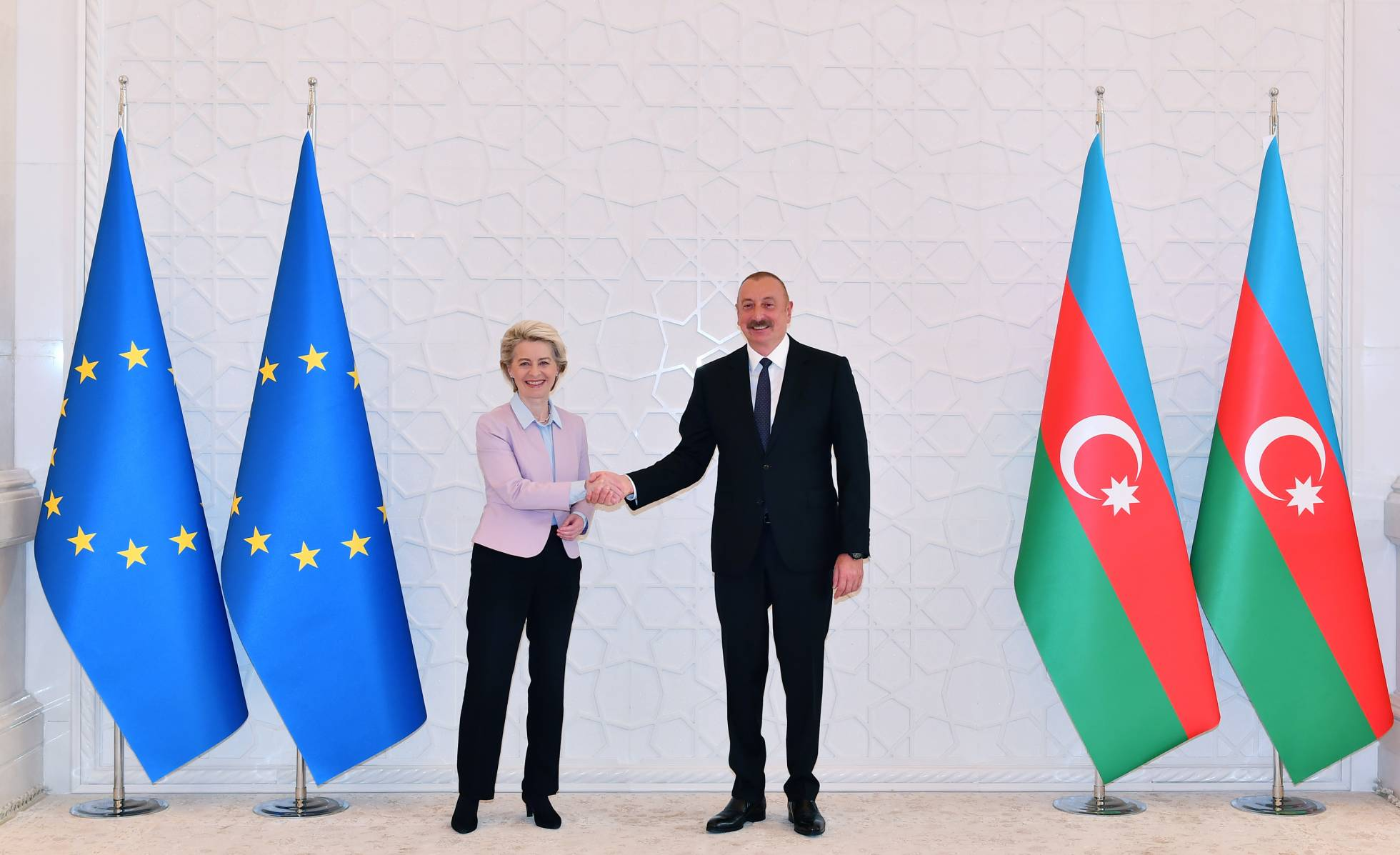
Von der Leyen with Azerbaijani president Ilham Aliyev, 18 July 2022

On 18 July 2022 von der Leyen called Azerbaijan a reliable partner for energy supply, later signing an agreement with Azerbaijan government intended to diversify gas supplies in the context of the ongoing Russian-Ukraine war 2022. This sparked controversy when Azerbaijan attacked its neighbour Armenia just a few months later, and Azeri soldiers committed various documented atrocities including rapes and the murder of prisoners of war. Human rights activists claim that an EU president cannot condemn one dictator while embracing another, which was also expressed in the EU parliament by Martin Sonneborn.

The deal will double Azerbaijan's natural gas exports through the Southern Gas Corridor by 2027.

=== 2023 ===
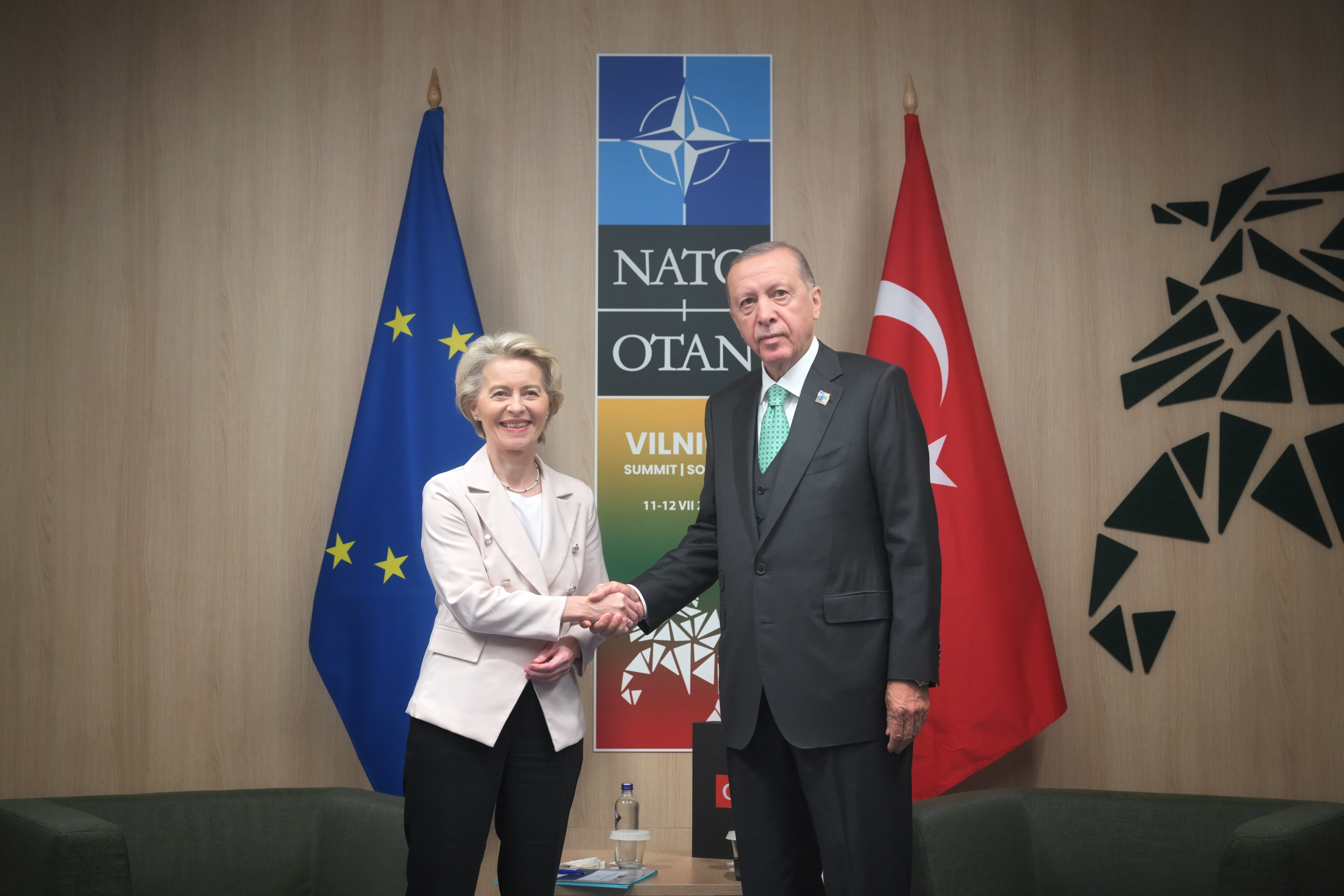
Von der Leyen with Turkish president Recep Tayyip Erdoğan, 2023 NATO summit in Vilnius, 12 July 2023

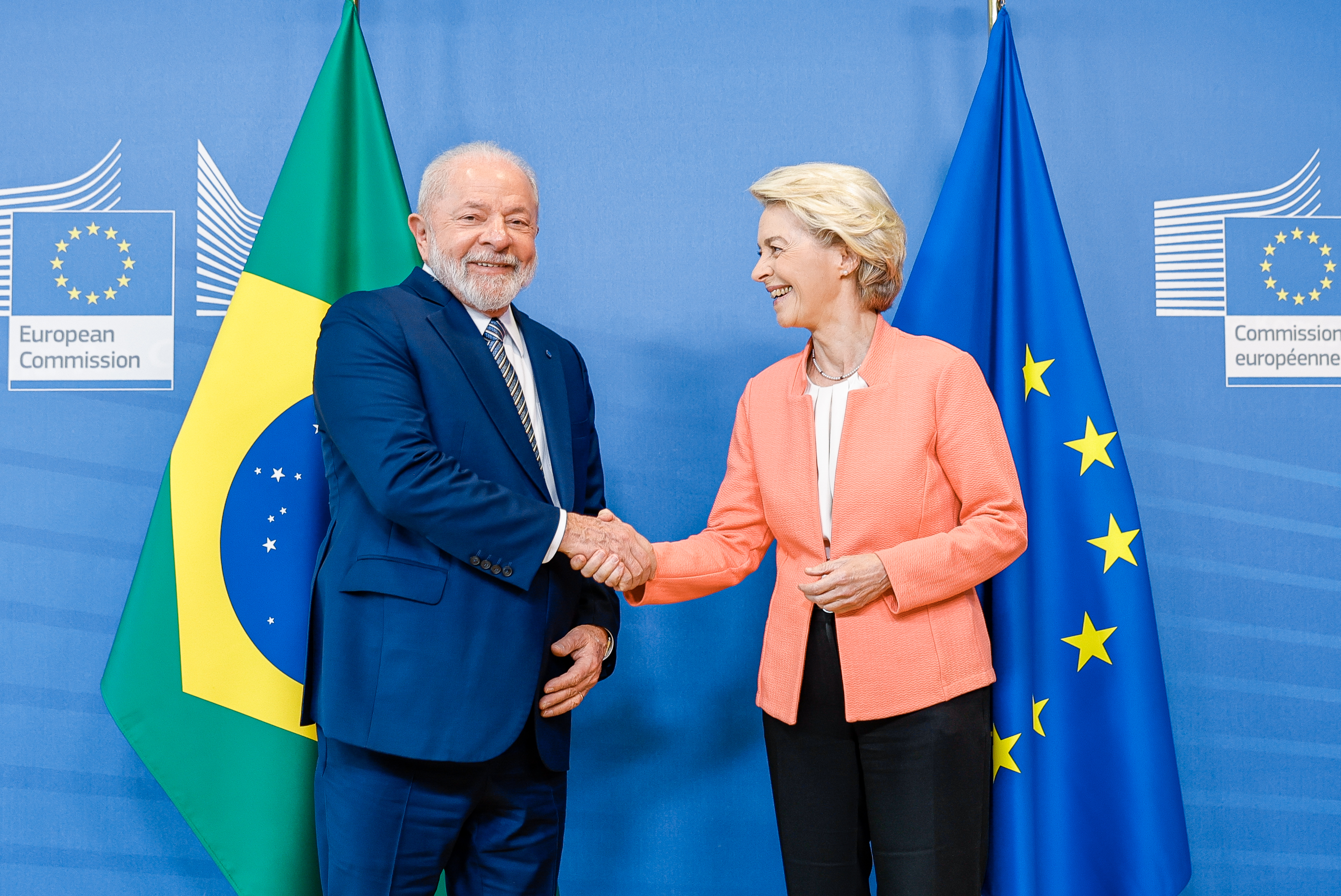
Von der Leyen with President of Brazil Luiz Inácio Lula da Silva, in Brussels, 17 July 2023

Von der Leyen with Ethiopian prime minister Abiy Ahmed and other leaders at the International Conference on Development and Migration in Rome, 23 July 2023

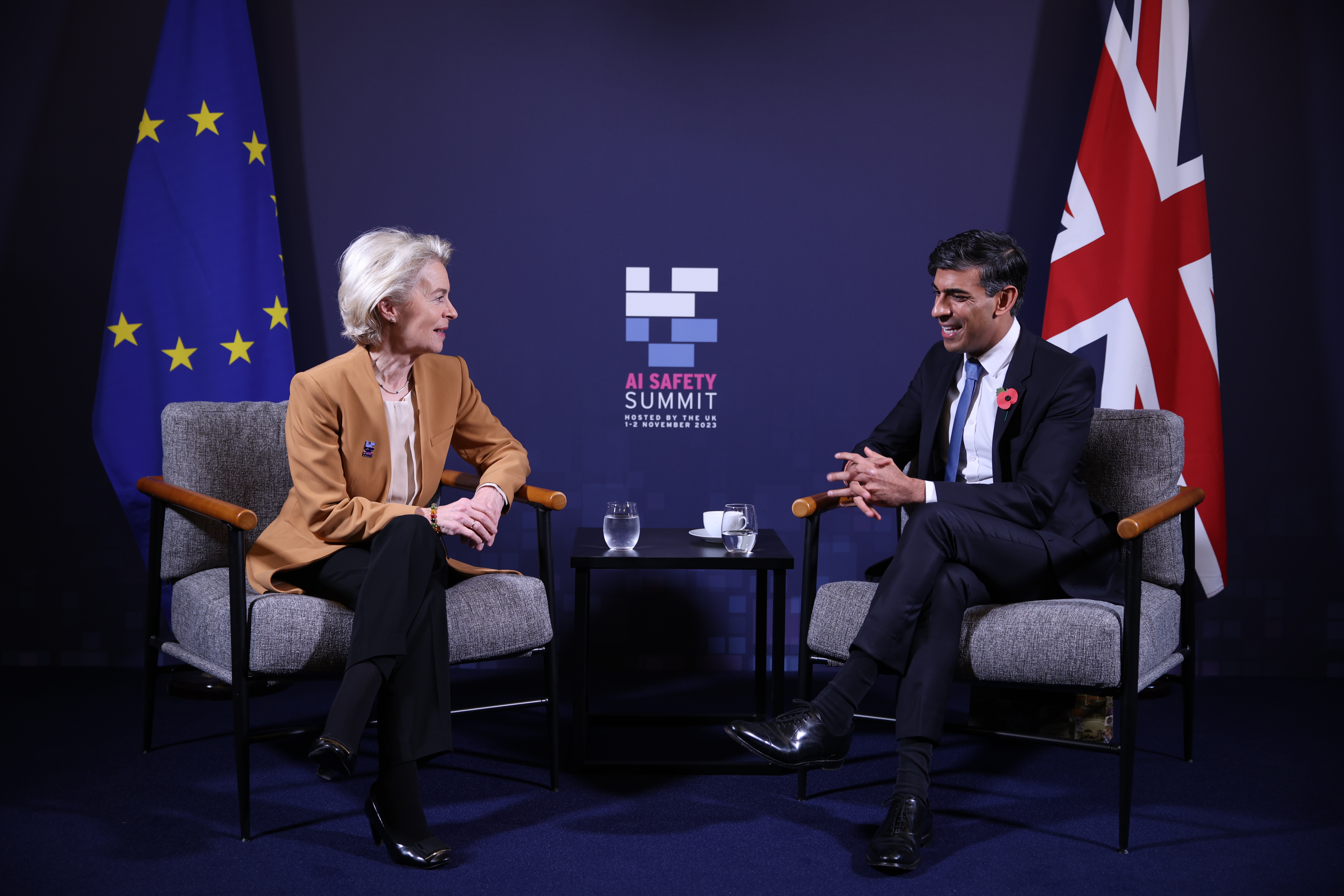
Von der Leyen with British prime minister Rishi Sunak, 2 November 2023

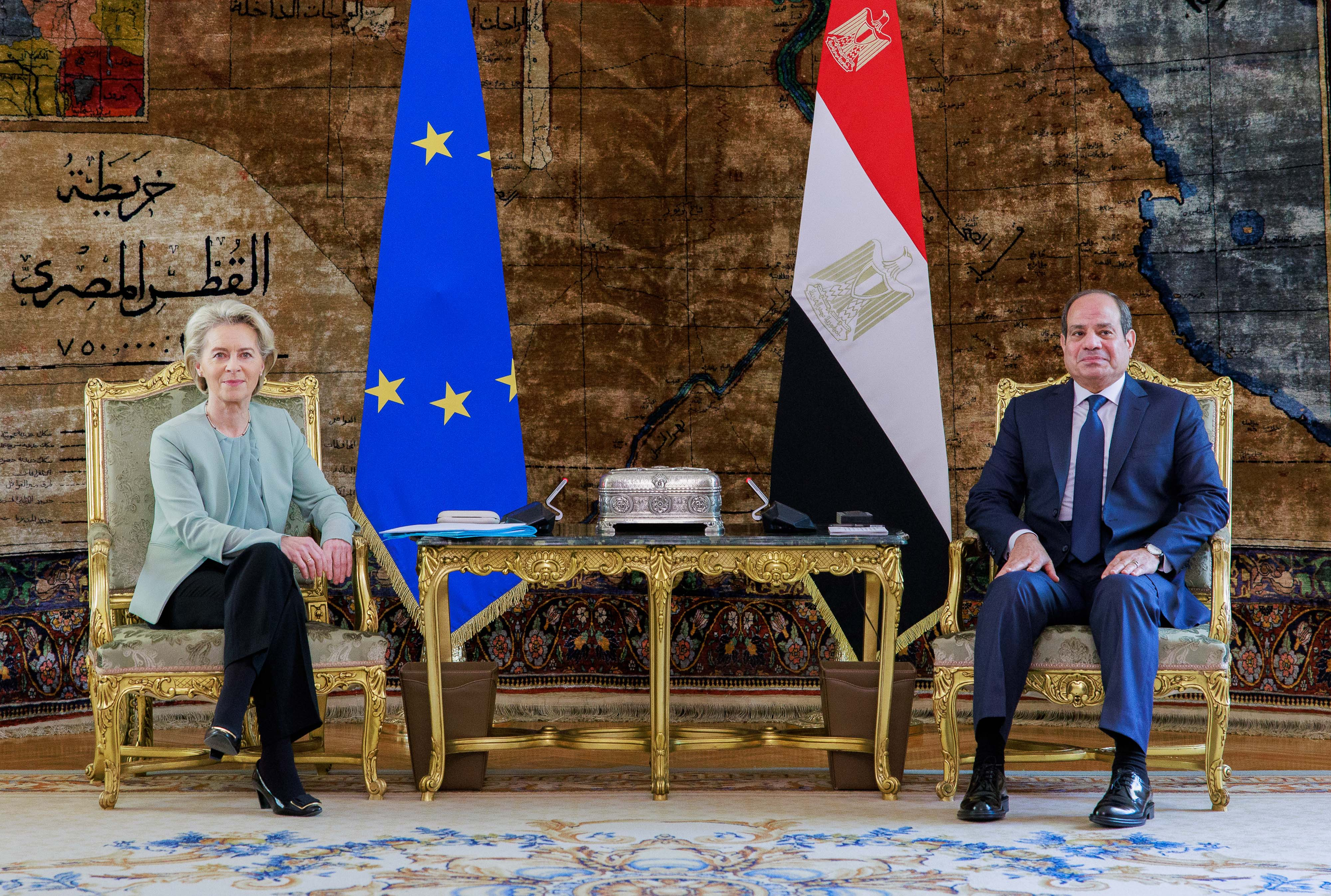
Von der Leyen with Egyptian president Abdel Fattah el-Sisi, in Cairo, 18 November 2023

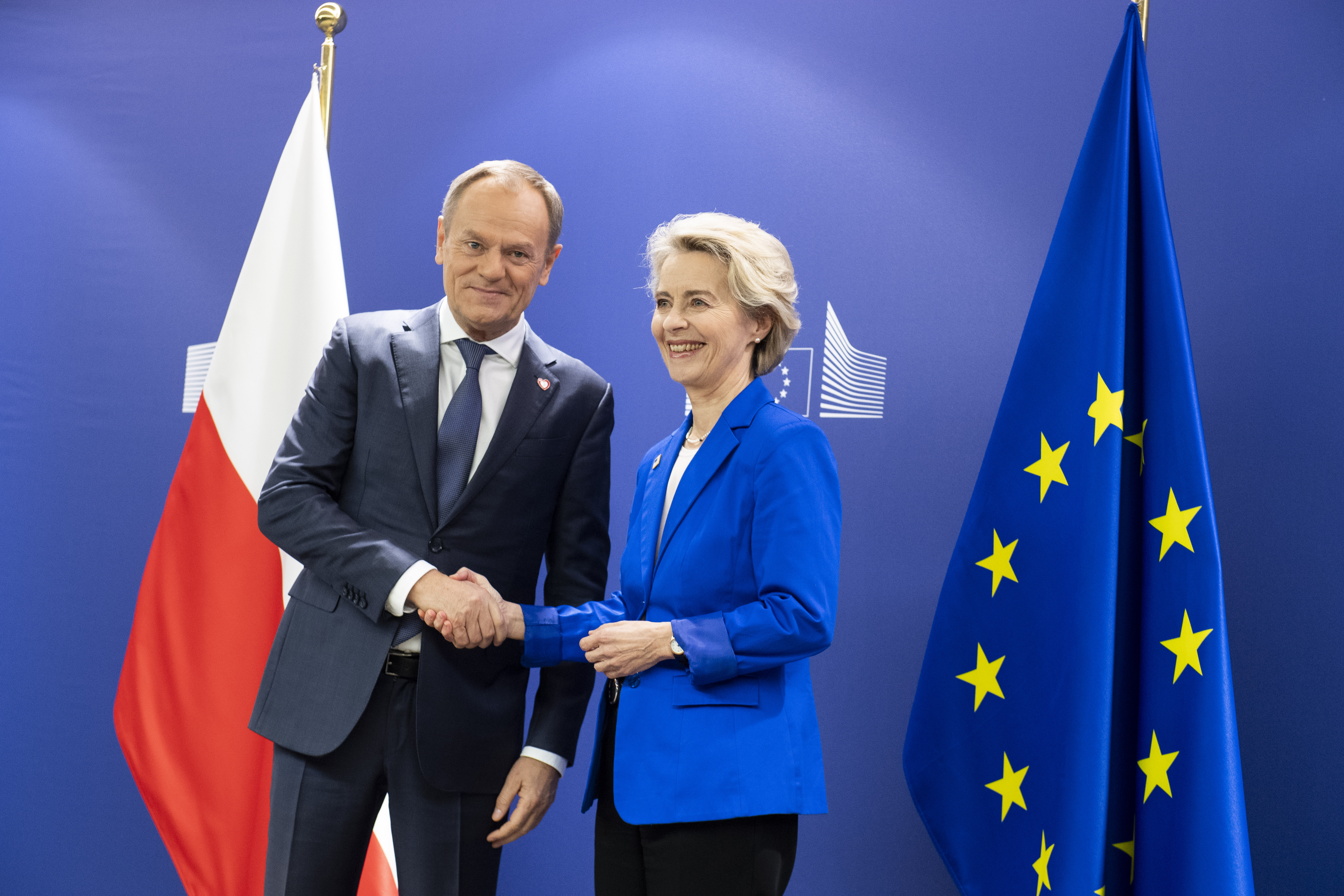
Von der Leyen with Prime Minister of Poland Donald Tusk, in Brussels, 15 December 2023

In February 2023, von der Leyen offered condolences to those who lost their lives in the Turkey-Syria earthquakes and wished a speedy recovery to the injured. Leyen also emphasised that the EU stood in solidarity with the Turkish and Syrian people. In April von der Leyen issued a video statement celebrating Israel's 75th Independence Day, noting that "the Jewish People could finally build a home in the Promised Land", adding that "You have literally made the desert bloom".

In July 2023, she visited the Philippines and praised the improvement in human rights in the Philippines while meeting with Philippine president Bongbong Marcos.

In October 2023, von der Leyen condemned "the military operation by Azerbaijan against the Armenian population of Nagorno-Karabakh and reaffirmed the need to respect the sovereignty and territorial integrity of Armenia".

During the Gaza war, von der Leyen condemned the Hamas attack on Israel, calling it "terrorism in its most despicable form" and saying "Israel has the right to defend itself against such heinous attacks". She announced that humanitarian aid to Gaza would be tripled.

In December 2023, she visited Egypt and discussed the "strategic partnership" between the EU and Egypt with Egyptian president Abdel Fattah el-Sisi.

==== Remarks at the Beyond Growth conference ====
In May 2023 at the Beyond Growth conference in the European Parliament, von der Leyen criticised the current economic model's excessive focus on GDP figures, saying "a growth model centred on fossil fuels is simply obsolete" and "economic growth is not an end in itself". About an hour later, the European Commission presented its economic forecast which talked about GDP and inflation without presenting any other parameters. Her remarks were part of a debate in the European Union on the possibility of not exceeding planetary boundaries in a GDP-based economy.

==== Migrant crisis in Italy ====
In 2022, the European Union recorded the highest number of unauthorised migrant arrivals since 2016. Von der Leyen tried to strike a deal with Tunisia's authoritarian president Kais Saied, with a focus on stopping illegal migration from Tunisia to Italy. In September 2023, more than 120 boats carrying around 7,000 migrants from Africa arrived on the Italian island of Lampedusa within 24 hours. Italian prime minister Giorgia Meloni declared that she wrote to von der Leyen "to ask her to come with me to Lampedusa to personally realize the gravity of the situation we face, and to immediately accelerate the implementation of the agreement with Tunisia by transferring the agreed resources".

=== 2024 ===
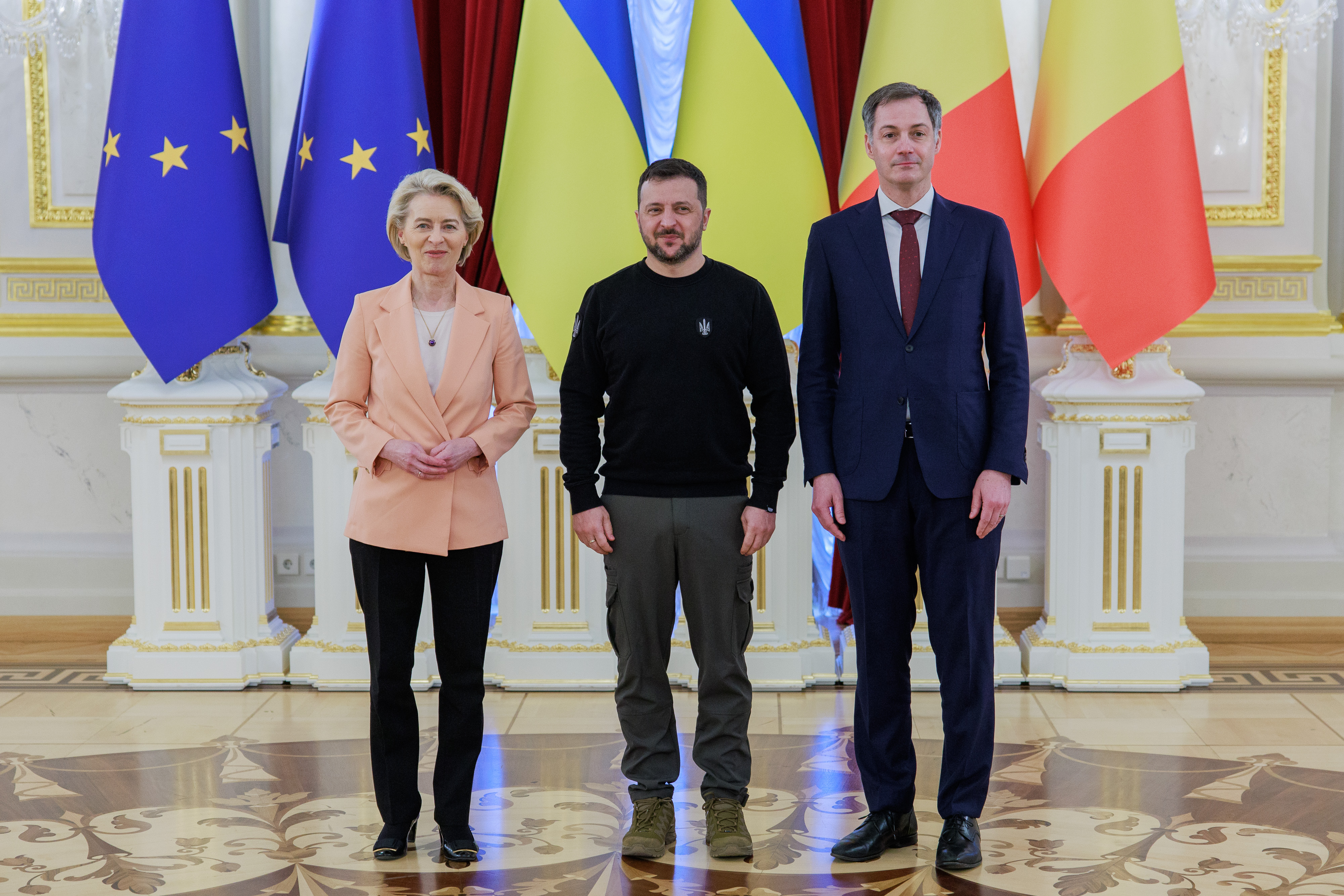
Von der Leyen with Ukrainian president Volodymyr Zelenskyy and Belgian prime minister Alexander De Croo in Kyiv, 24 February 2024

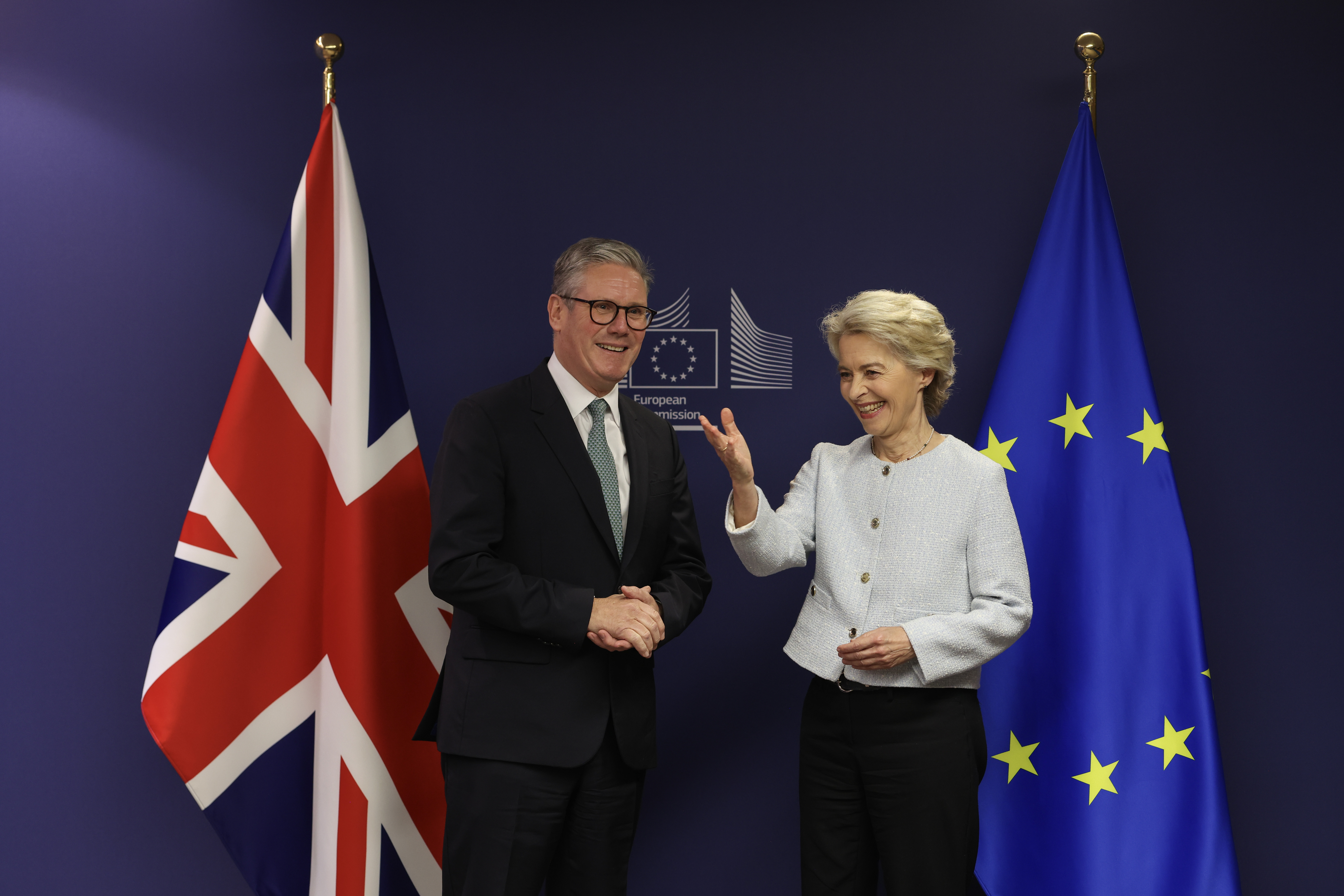
Von der Leyen with British prime minister Keir Starmer in Brussels, 2 October 2024

==== Second candidacy ====
In March 2024 von der Leyen was once again confirmed as the EPP's candidate for the Presidency of the European Commission. Opinion polls deemed her re-election as president very likely.

In April 2024, she praised the EU Asylum and Migration Pact as a "huge achievement for Europe". Countries where migrants first arrive will newly be able to relocate a total of up to 30,000 migrants per year to other EU member states. The Pact will institute a "mandatory solidarity mechanism". The Pact has been criticised by some right-wing politicians for not going far enough to prevent illegal immigration, such as missing provisions relating to migrant returns.

On 27 June 2024, the European Council nominated von der Leyen for a second term as President of the European Commission. On 18 July 2024, she was re-elected for a further five-year term after a secret ballot among MEPs at the European Parliament, winning 401 votes in favour compared to 284 against with 22 blank or invalid ballot papers.

In the fall of 2024, von der Leyen became an advocate for nuclear power, along with her party, CDU.

Promoting the European Green Deal and the green transition remained a priority for the second von der Leyen Commission.

=== 2025 ===
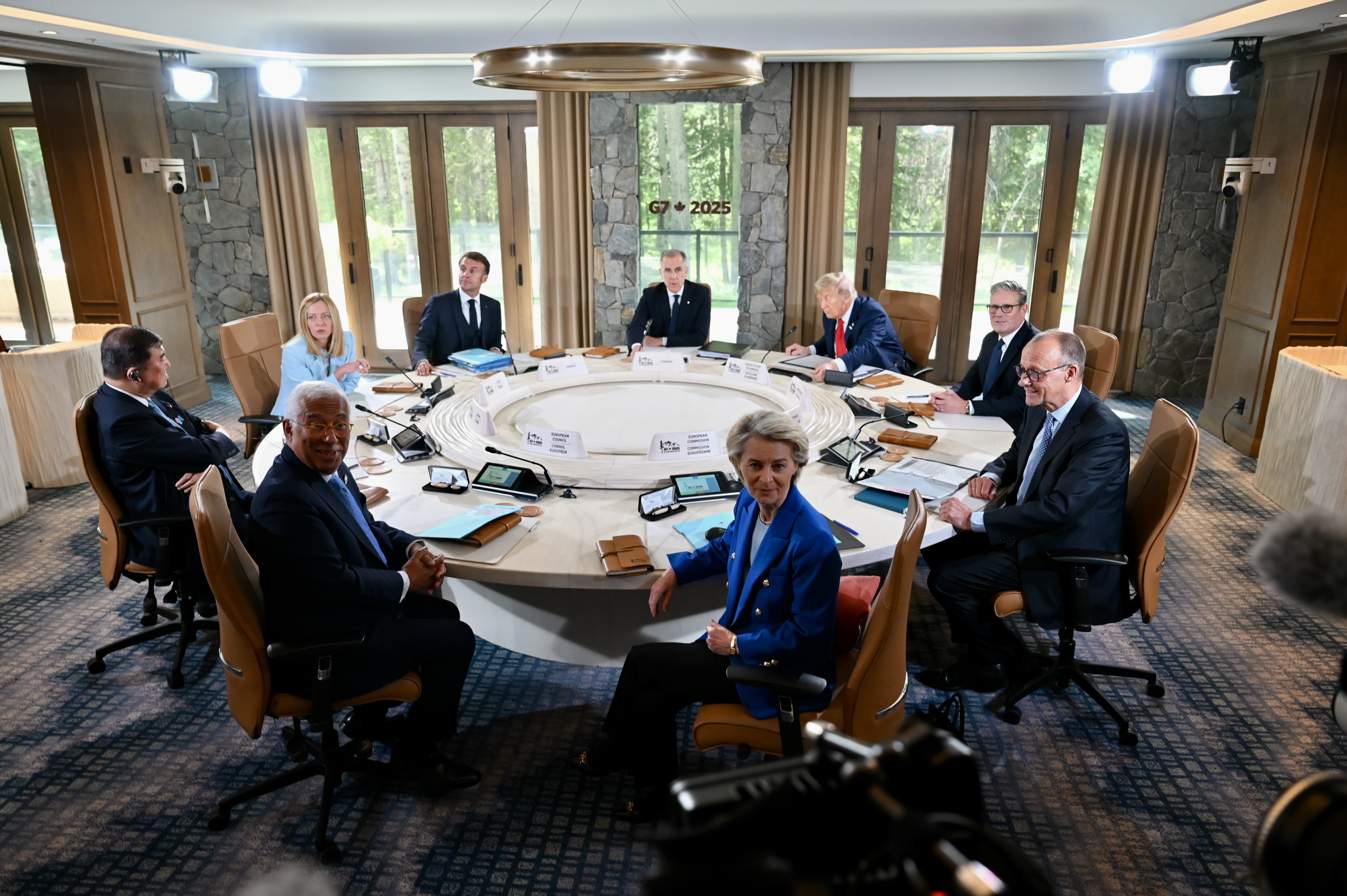
Ursula von der Leyen at the G7 Summit in Canada, 2025

On 26 February 2025, the Commission announced a collection of measures backed by 100 billion euros ($104.94 billion) to support EU-made clean manufacturing, called the Clean Industrial Deal.

On 4 March 2025, von der Leyen announced the EU's €800 billion ($840 billion) defence investment plan "ReArm Europe". She suggested that the European Union might need to ease its fiscal rules regarding national debt to facilitate increased defence spending by member states.

In July 2025, Indonesian president Prabowo Subianto and von der Leyen reached a political agreement on the Indonesia-EU Comprehensive Economic Partnership Agreement (CEPA).

In July 2025, von der Leyen survived a vote of no confidence, with 360 MEPs against and 175 in favour. EPP, S&D, Renew Europe, Greens/EFA and parts of ECR supported her, While PfE, ESN, The Left and parts of ECR opposed her.

At the July 2025 EU-China summit in Beijing, Von der Leyen expressed multiple concerns regarding China's role in the deterioration of bilateral relations. She cited the growing trade imbalance—highlighting the EU's €305.8 billion deficit with China—as a result of industrial overcapacity and limited market access for European firms. Von der Leyen also criticised China's export controls and use of its dominant position in rare earths to undermine global competitors. Additionally, she identified China's ongoing ties with Russia amid the war in Ukraine as a "determining factor" in the future of EU-China relations and urged Beijing to use its influence to help end the conflict.

On 27 July 2025, von der Leyen and US president Donald Trump announced a new customs agreement between the EU and the United States, with 15% tariffs on European exports.

In November 2025 at COP 30 the European Commission led by von der Leyen helped launch the Open Coalition on Compliance Carbon Markets. 18 countries joined. The coalition aims to establish a global carbon market which can speed up emission reduction seven-fold.

=== 2026 ===
On 9 January 2026, during a historic visit to Damascus, von der Leyen met with Syrian president Ahmed al-Sharaa and announced a substantial financial assistance package of approximately €620 million, to be disbursed in 2026 and 2027. This visit marked a significant shift in EU-Syria relations following the fall of the Assad regime in late 2024. During her stay, von der Leyen described the ongoing clashes in Aleppo between the Syrian government and the Kurdish-led SDF as "worrying".

In January 2026, von der Leyen strongly condemned the violent crackdown on widespread anti-government protests in Iran. Responding to reports of escalating casualties, she characterised the situation as "horrifying."

Von der Leyen and the leaders of the Mercosur countries (Argentina, Brazil, Paraguay, and Uruguay) formally signed the EU–Mercosur free trade agreement on 17 January 2026, in Asunción, Paraguay. This historic event marked the culmination of over 25 years of negotiations aimed at establishing one of the world's largest free trade zones.

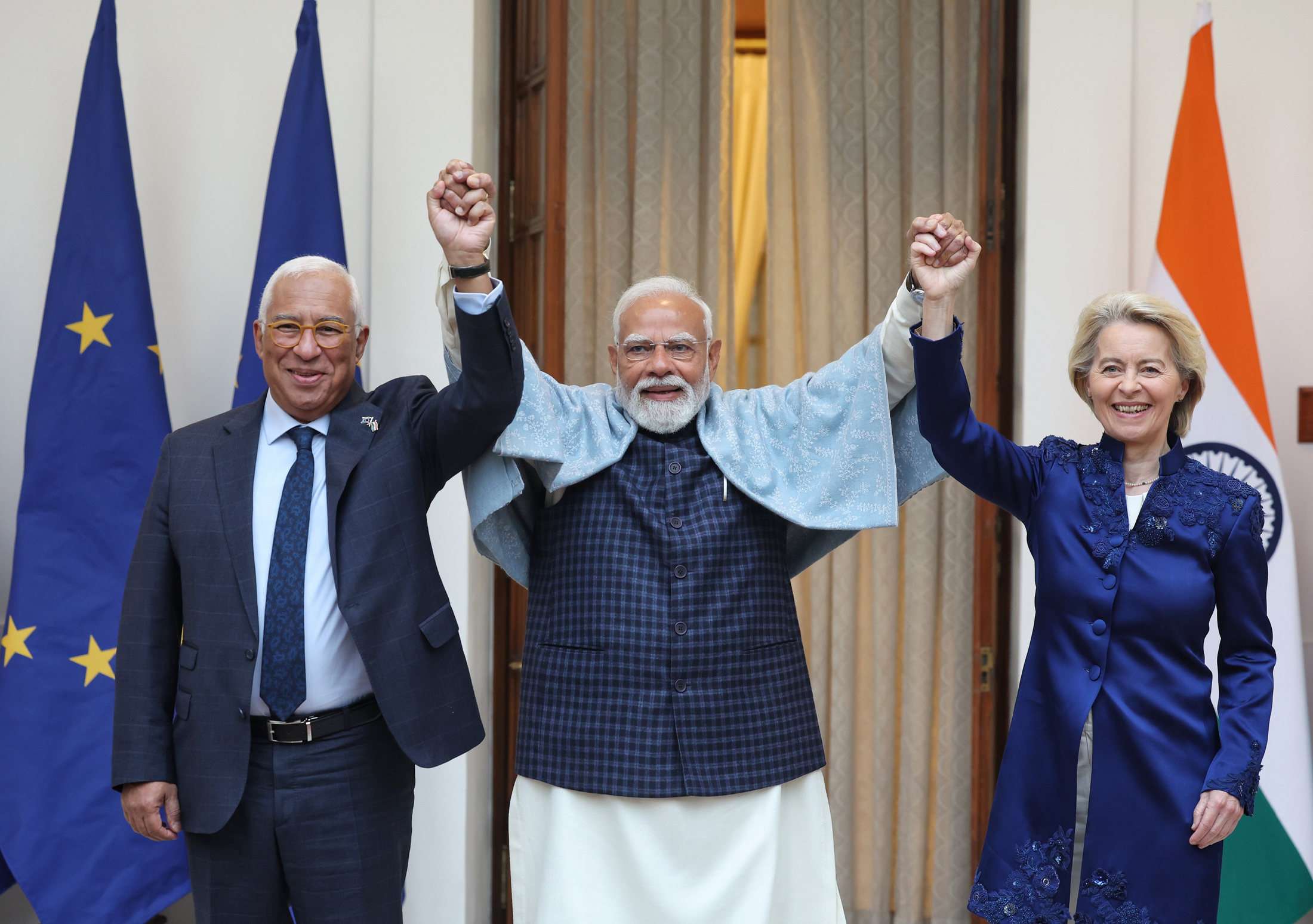
António Costa, Narendra Modi, and Ursula von der Leyen during the official signing ceremony of the India–European Union Free Trade Agreement, 27 January 2026

In January 2026, India and the European Union concluded a landmark India–European Union Free Trade Agreement, aimed at eliminating tariffs on over 90% of goods to strengthen economic and strategic ties. Described by von der Leyen as the "mother off [sic] all deals," the pact followed 18 years of negotiations and included a separate mobility and migration agreement.

At a nuclear energy summit in Paris on 10 March 2026, von der Leyen described Europe's reduction of nuclear power as a 'strategic mistake'. She stated that the subsequent reliance on imported fossil fuels had left the continent vulnerable to price surges, particularly exacerbated by the ongoing Iran war.

In June 2026, amid the Ukrainian conscription crisis, von der Leyen signalled plans to alter the terms of the Temporary Protection Directive, an emergency mechanism granting immediate protection to displaced persons fleeing the Russo-Ukrainian War. In a letter to bloc leaders, she emphasised that future extensions must not undermine Ukraine's self-defense capacity. Following these discussions, the European Commission formally proposed extending temporary protection until March 2028 while excluding newly arriving Ukrainian men aged 23 to 60 subject to mobilisation, a move requested by Kyiv to support its defence needs.

In September 2026, prime minister Mark Carney announced that Canada was pursuing a "unique alliance" with the European Union rather than seeking full membership in the bloc, with von der Leyen "opening the door" for Canada potentially becoming an "associate member" of the bloc.

== Other activities ==
Von der Leyen is a member of the German branch of the European Movement. She is, or has been, also a member of several boards of trustees:

- Total E-Quality initiative, Member of the Board of Trustees
- Mädchenchor Hannover, Member of the Board of Trustees
- World Economic Forum (WEF), Member of the Board of Trustees (2016–2019)
- World Economic Forum on the Middle East and North Africa, Co-chair (2017)
- Munich Security Conference, Member of the Advisory Council (2013–2019)
- 2011 FIFA Women's World Cup, Member of the Board of Trustees (2010–2011)

== Political views ==
=== Childcare and parental leave ===
Ursula von der Leyen assumed her office as Federal Minister for Family Affairs, Senior Citizens, Women and Youth in 2005. Amidst protest (particularly from the conservative wing of the CDU), she introduced the Child Advancement Act (Kinderförderungsgesetz), which reserved 4.3 billion euros for the creation of childcare structures throughout Germany.

Von der Leyen also introduced the German Elternzeit, a paid parental leave scheme. Following Scandinavian models, the scheme reserves two additional months for fathers who go on parental leave as well (Vätermonate in German). This part of the law, in particular, attracted protest from some German conservatives. Catholic Bishop Walter Mixa accused von der Leyen of turning women into "birthing machines". Meanwhile, Bavarian colleagues from von der Leyen's sister party, the CSU, complained that men did not need a "diaper-changing internship". Von der Leyen successfully influenced public opinion of her reforms with a 3-million-euro PR campaign, which was criticised for using public funds for political advocacy and for employing embedded marketing techniques.

=== Blocking internet child pornography ===
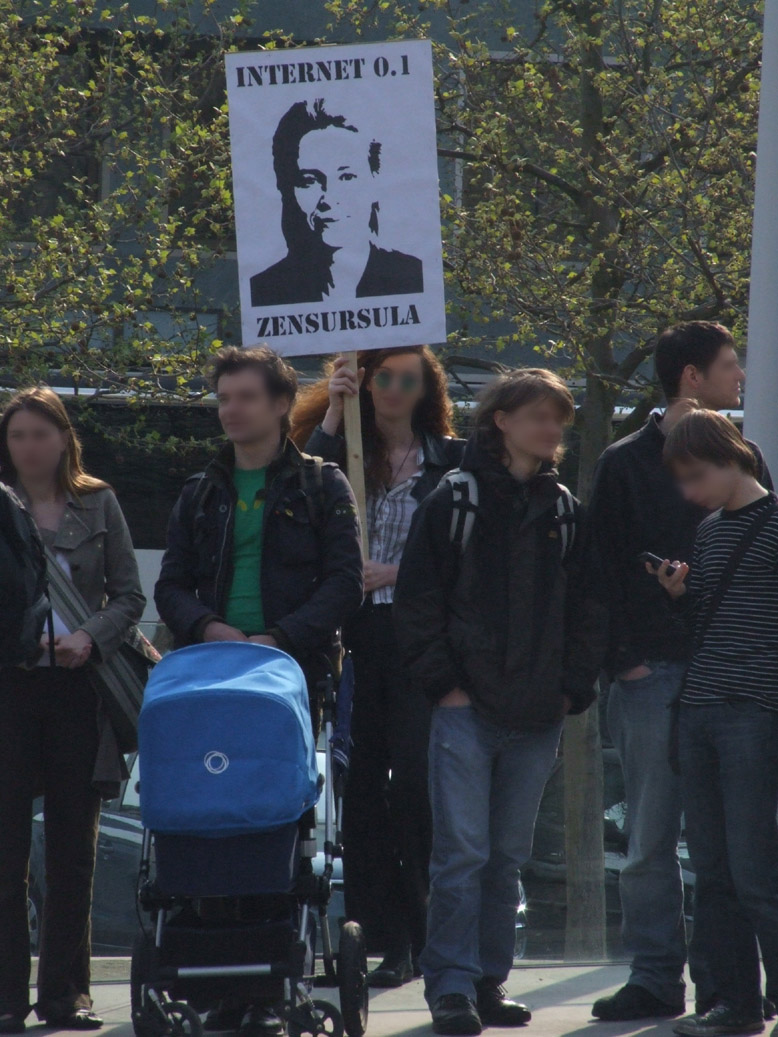
Demonstration on 17 April 2009 against internet censorship

Ursula von der Leyen advocated the initiation of a mandatory blockage of child pornography on the Internet through service providers via a block list maintained by the Federal Criminal Police Office of Germany (BKA), thus creating the necessary infrastructure for extensive censorship of websites deemed illegal by the BKA.

These actions brought her the nickname "Zensursula", a portmanteau word blending the German word for censorship ("Zensur") and her given name ("Ursula"). The combination of a sensitive topic like child pornography and internet censorship is said to have caused a rising interest in the Pirate Party.

In July 2009, she referred to the problems of struggling against paedophile pornography on the internet as the responsible persons often use servers located in Africa or India, where, she said, "child pornography is legal". This claim was based on a 2006 study by the International Centre for Missing & Exploited Children. As child pornography is illegal in India, and the country has stricter rules about all pornography than Germany, she later expressed regret for citing an inaccurate study.

=== Women board quota ===
In 2013, von der Leyen unsuccessfully campaigned for a statutory quota for female participation in the supervisory boards of companies in Germany, requiring company boards to be at least 20% female by 2018, rising to 40% by 2023.

=== German foreign policy ===
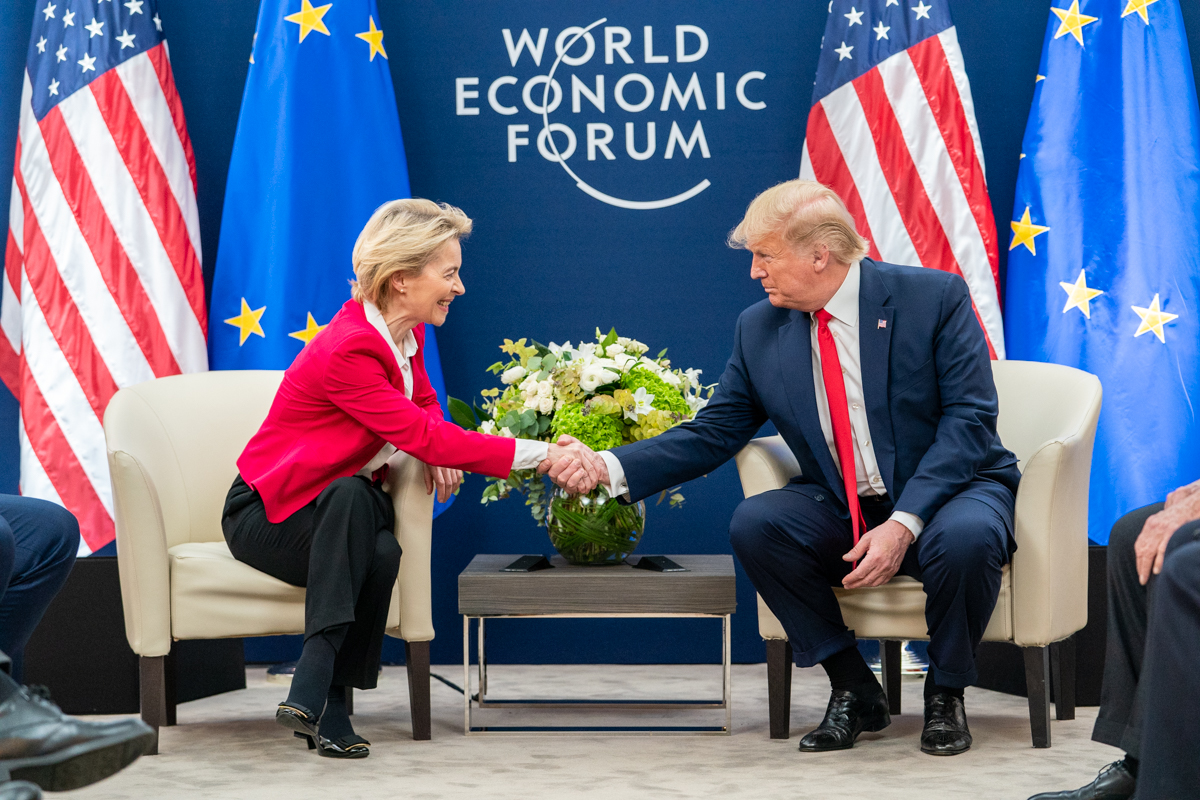
Von der Leyen with US president Donald Trump in January 2020

Von der Leyen is a proponent of a more assertive German foreign policy. One striking example was the decision in September 2014 to send arms to Kurdish and Iraqi security forces. This decision broke a longstanding taboo on Germany's dispatching of weapons to a conflict zone.

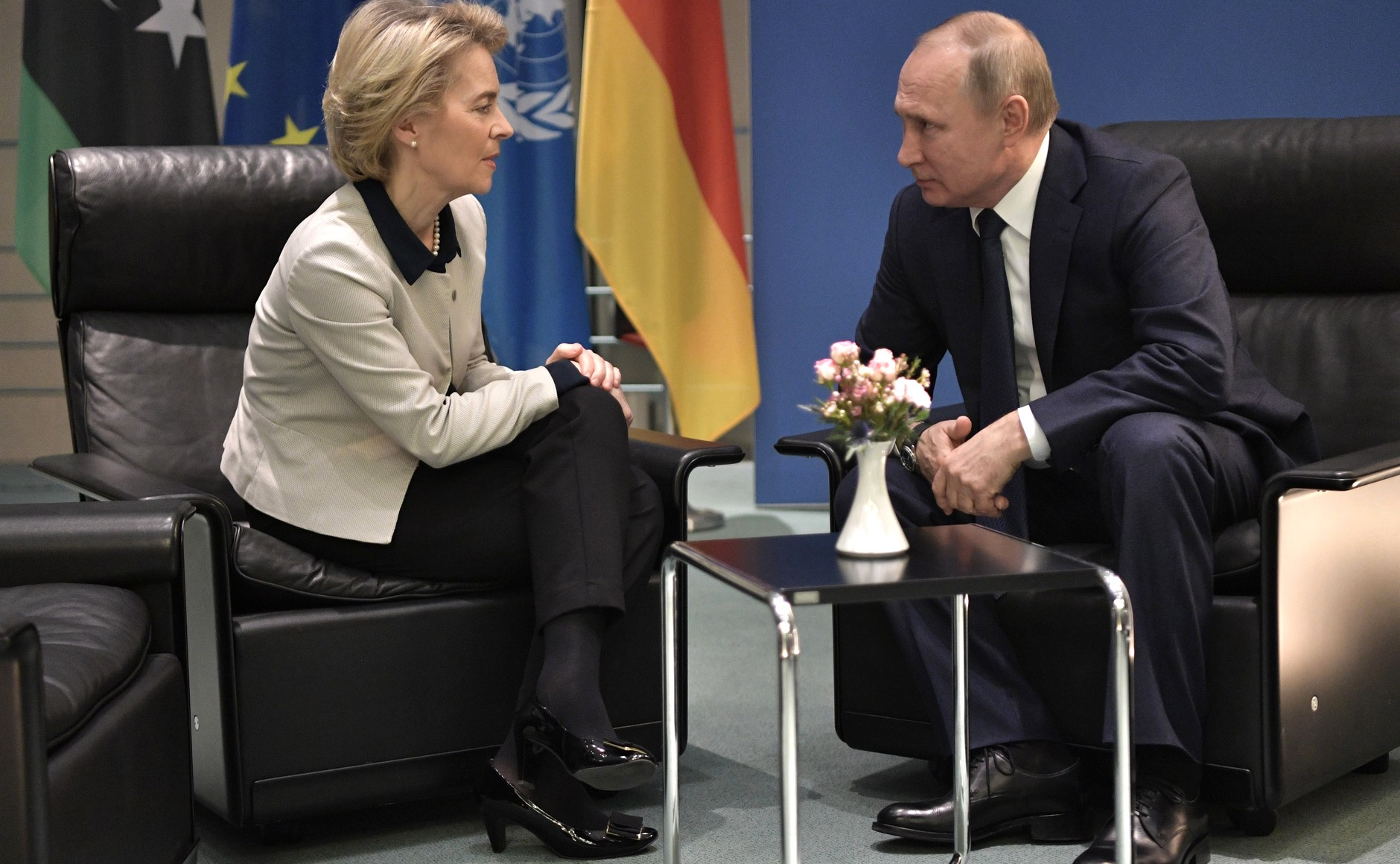
Von der Leyen and Russian president Vladimir Putin at the International Conference on Libya, 19 January 2020

On the deteriorating relationship between Europe and Russia during the annexation of Crimea, she argued that "the reliance on a functioning business relationship with Europe is much, much bigger in Russia" and that sanctions should prod the oligarchs and Russian business. She also called for more significant NATO backing of the Baltic states during Russia's invasion of Crimea in 2014.

Von der Leyen has supported close security cooperation with Saudi Arabia. German opposition parties criticised Germany's defence plan with Saudi Arabia, which has been waging war in Yemen and was condemned for massive human rights violations. In 2016, von der Leyen caused controversy after she refused to wear a hijab while visiting Saudi Arabia. She said: "It annoys me when women are to be pushed into wearing the abaya."

In 2017 von der Leyen noted that "healthy democratic resistance of the younger generation" in Poland must be supported. In some Polish media, it was understood that she instigated opposition aimed to overthrow the allegedly anti-democratic and authoritarian PiS government; the statement was branded as scandalous. The Polish Foreign Minister made sarcastic comments about "Prussian tone of the Ode to Joy". The Polish Minister of Defence summoned the Germany military attache and demanded explanations. The German embassy in Warsaw and spokesman for the German defence ministry in Berlin issued conciliatory statements. The German media mostly ignored the incident; some acknowledged a "minor slip of the tongue" on the part of von der Leyen, yet also noted that German-Polish relations were "severely damaged".

Von der Leyen responded to Donald Trump's criticism of the Russian-backed Nord Stream 2—a pipeline for delivering natural gas from Russia to Germany—in an interview with the BBC: "We have an independent energy supply, we are an independent country, we are just diversifying."

=== European integration ===
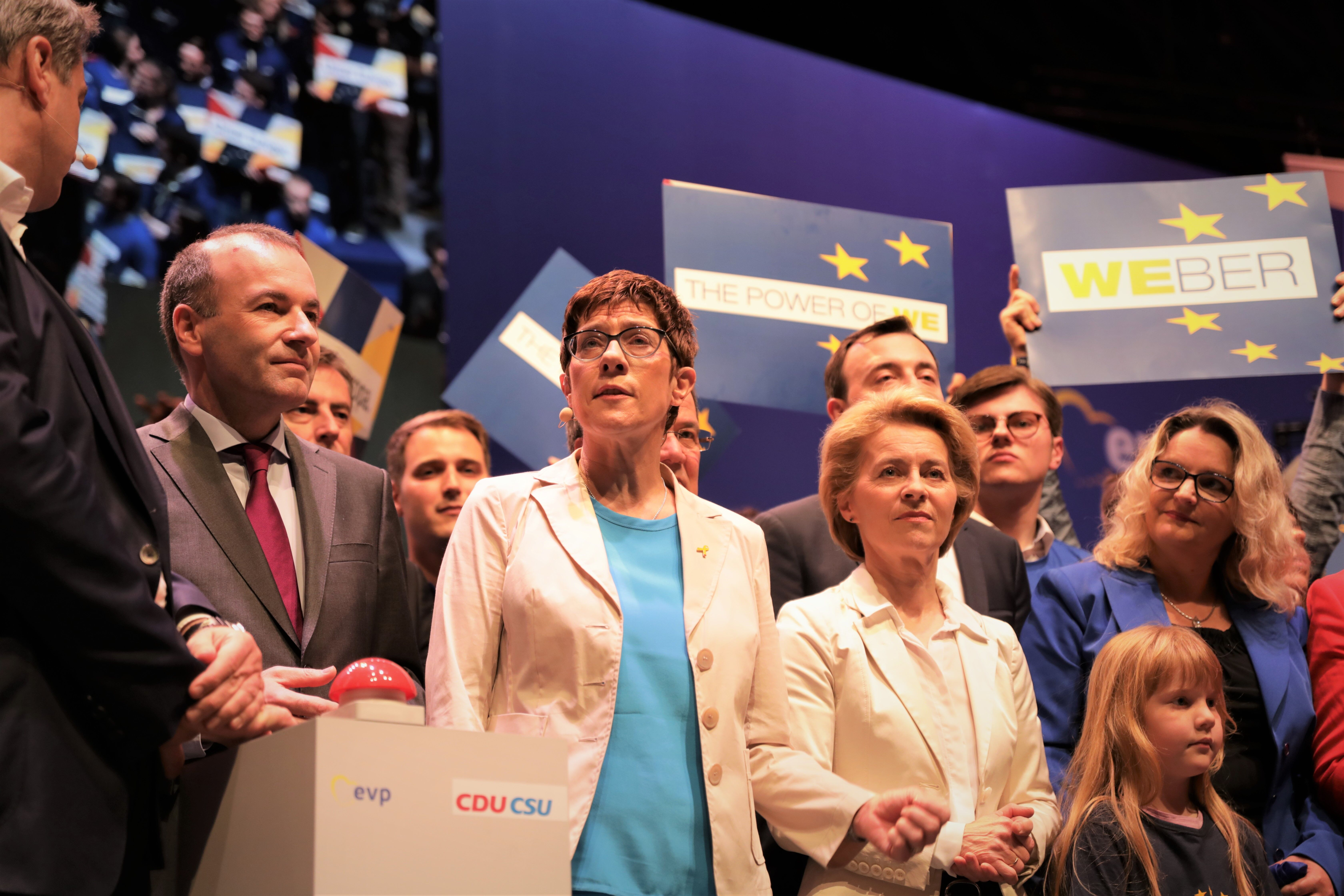
Manfred Weber, Annegret Kramp-Karrenbauer and von der Leyen in April 2019

In a 2011 interview with Der Spiegel, von der Leyen expressed her preference for "a united states of Europe—run along the lines of the federal states of Switzerland, Germany or the USA" which would capitalise on Europe's size by agreeing on core issues relating to finance, tax and economic politics.

With 2014 marking the centenary of the start of World War I, von der Leyen—in her capacity as defence minister—inaugurated a memorial for the Armistice Day in Ablain-Saint-Nazaire alongside French president François Hollande and North Rhine-Westphalia State Premier Hannelore Kraft, as well as British and Belgian officials.

In 2015, von der Leyen argued that a form of EU army should be a long-term goal. She also said that she was convinced about the goal of a combined military force, just as she was convinced that "perhaps not my children, but then my grandchildren will experience a United States of Europe". In March 2015, she and her counterparts from France and Poland, Jean-Yves Le Drian and Tomasz Siemoniak, revived a meeting format intended to promote cooperation between the three countries in crisis zones by holding their first meeting between the Weimar Triangle defence ministers since 2007.

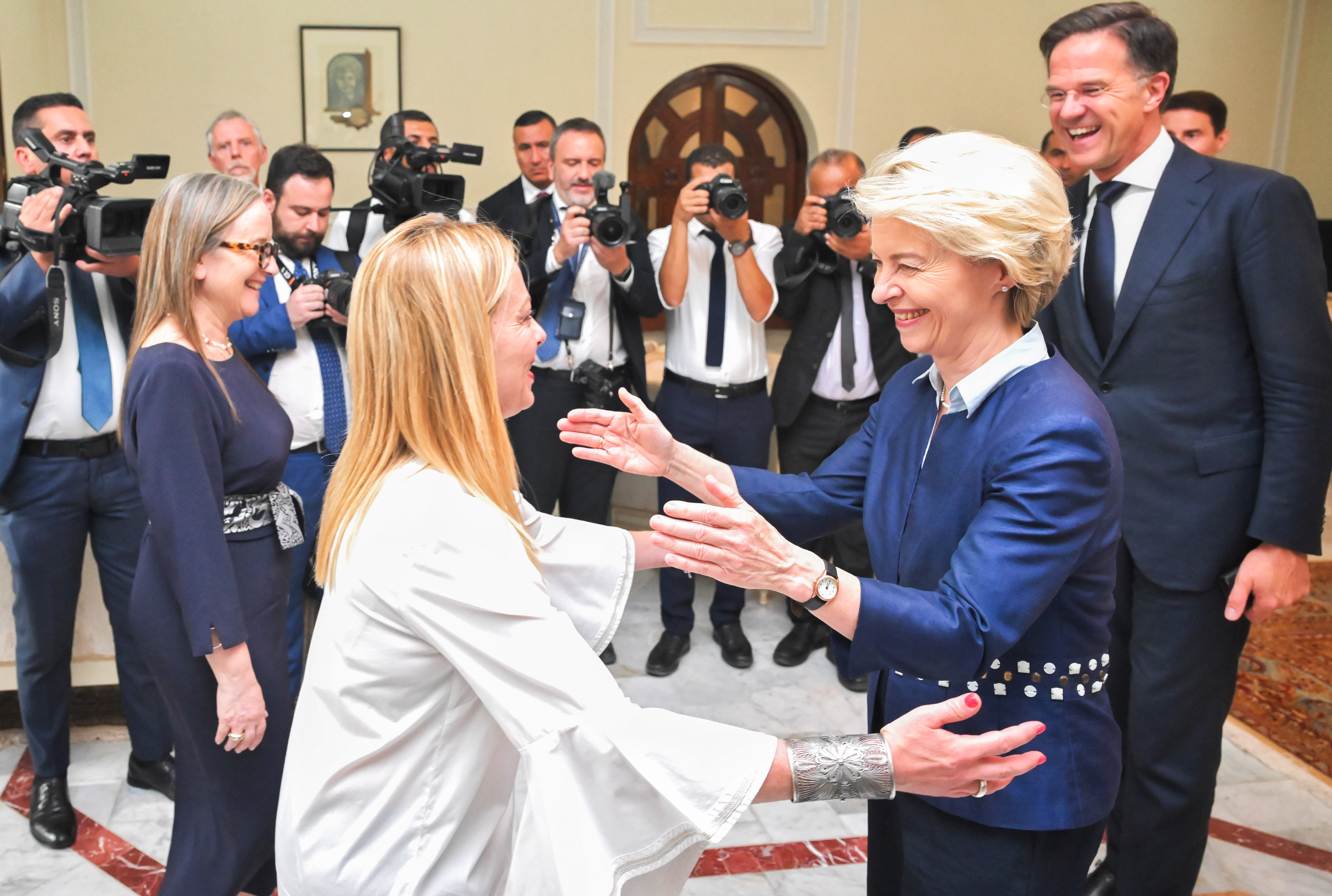
Von der Leyen with Italian prime minister Giorgia Meloni and Dutch prime minister Mark Rutte, 3 November 2022

Following the 2016 European Union membership referendum in the United Kingdom, she argued that the UK had "paralysed" European efforts to integrate security policy and "consistently blocked everything with the label 'Europe' on it". She has described Brexit as "a burst bubble of hollow promises". In an interview with The Guardian days after her election to succeed Jean-Claude Juncker as President of the European Commission, she stated that the withdrawal deal agreed between Theresa May and chief Brexit negotiator Michel Barnier would remain the basis of any future talks. She also stated that the EU should extend the Brexit deadline beyond 31 October 2019. In November 2019, at Paris Peace Forum, von der Leyen said that there is need for stable and responsible leadership in Europe and that the bloc must increase foreign policy budget spending by one-third.

=== Human rights in China ===
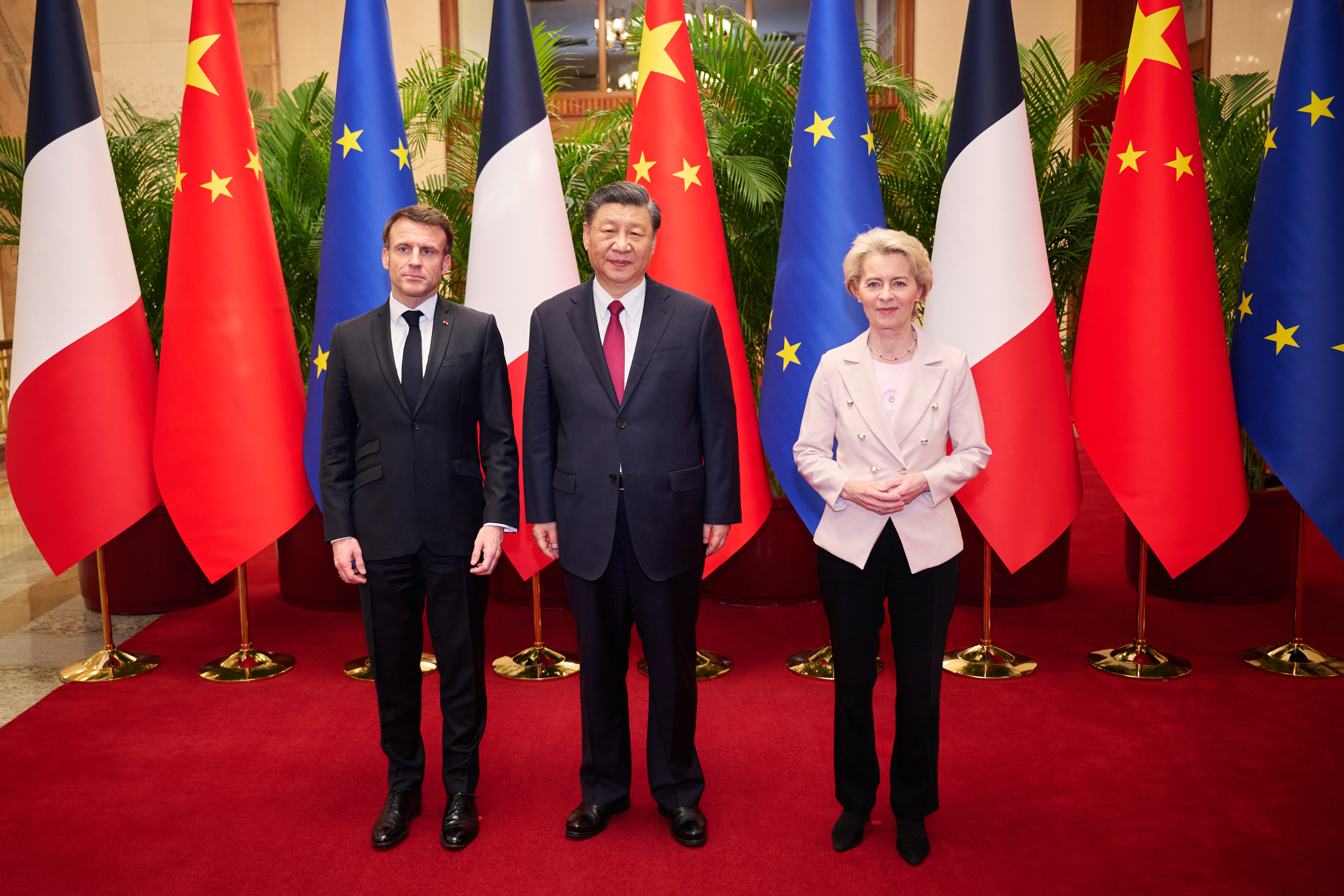
Ursula von der Leyen, French president Emmanuel Macron and Chinese leader Xi Jinping in Beijing, China, 6 April 2023

Von der Leyen and French president Emmanuel Macron raised the issue of human rights in China during their visit to China in April 2023, amid growing international criticism of China's repression of ethnic minorities, political dissidents, and civil society activists under the general secretaryship of Xi Jinping. They expressed their concerns over the situation in Xinjiang, where the Chinese government has detained an estimated one million Uyghurs and other Turkic Muslims in re-education camps, subjected them to forced labour, surveillance, and abuse. They also urged China to respect the autonomy and freedoms of Hong Kong.

=== Same-sex marriage ===
When the Federal Constitutional Court ruled in favour of tax equality for same-sex couples in 2013, von der Leyen came forward in support of equal adoption rights, arguing, "I know of no study that says that children growing up in same-sex partnerships fare any differently than children who grow up in heterosexual marriages or partnerships." In June 2017, von der Leyen voted against her parliamentary group's majority and in favour of Germany's introduction of same-sex marriage.

=== Israel–Palestine ===
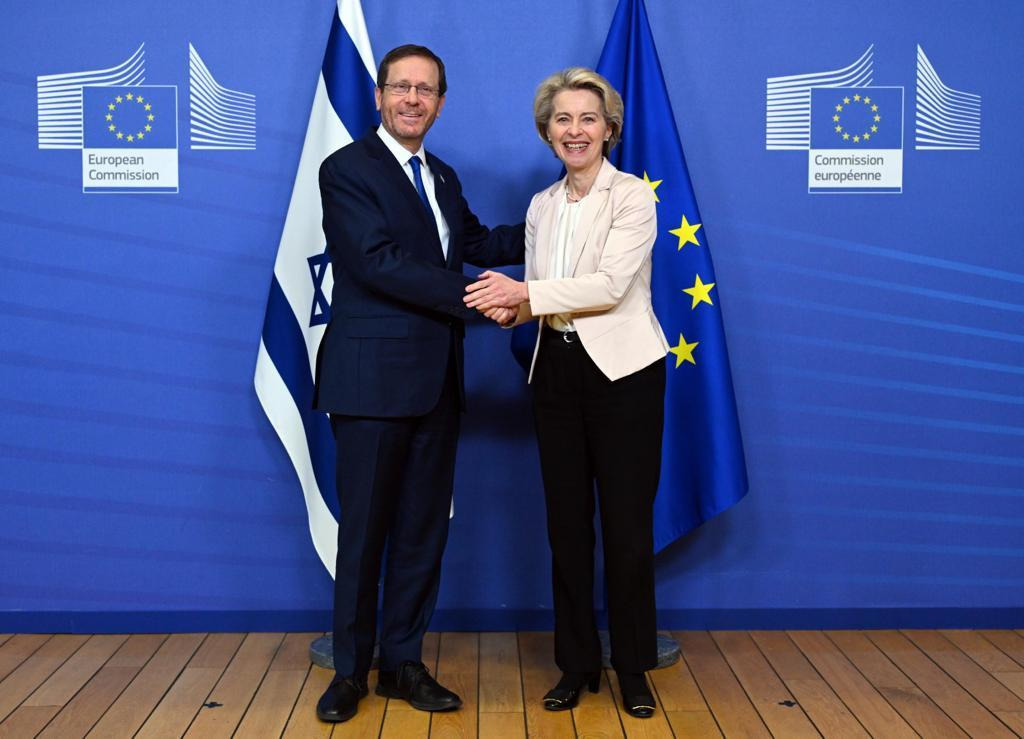
Von der Leyen with Israeli president Isaac Herzog in Brussels, January 2023

On the 75th anniversary of Israel's independence, von der Leyen referred to Israel as a "vibrant democracy" in the Middle East that made "the desert bloom". These remarks were criticised as racist by the foreign ministry of the Palestinian Authority.

In 2022, von der Leyen received an honorary doctorate degree from Ben-Gurion University of the Negev, Israel. During her acceptance speech, she addressed the rise of antisemitism and the challenges it poses to democracy, fighting antisemitism while fostering Jewish life, and the bond that Europe shares with Israel. In her speech at Ben-Gurion University Ursula von der Leyen stated that "Europe is the values of the Talmud," highlighting shared ethical foundations like personal responsibility, justice, and solidarity.

During the 2023 Gaza war, she was criticised by EU lawmakers and diplomats for supporting Israel and not calling for a ceasefire. On 13 October 2023, she visited Israel to express solidarity with the country. EU foreign policy chief Josep Borrell criticised her for the pro-Israeli stance she took on the trip which, he said, "has had a high geopolitical cost for Europe". (Note: "ha tenido un alto coste geopolítico para Europa")

In October 2023, 841 EU staff signed a letter to von der Leyen criticising her stance on the conflict. It stated the commission was giving "a free hand to the acceleration and the legitimacy of a war crime in the Gaza Strip" and warned that the EU was "losing all credibility and the position as a fair, equitable and humanist broker". In May 2025, Francesca Albanese, UN special rapporteur for the Palestinian territories, suggested von der Leyen be charged for complicity in Israeli war crimes.

=== Environment ===
Von der Leyen promoted the European Green Deal. and the Open Coalition on Compliance Carbon Markets. She complained that, "Global markets are now flooded with cheaper Chinese electric cars, and their price is kept artificially low by huge state subsidies."

=== Global affairs ===
In March 2026, von der Leyen declared the traditional 'rules-based' international order finished, advocating for a more interest-driven and realistic EU foreign policy in response to rising global instability. Addressing the US-Israeli strikes on Iran, she argued 'no tears should be shed' for the Iranian regime, despite noting security risks to Europe. This rhetoric, particularly her dismissal of the rules-based framework, sparked significant criticism from several EU capitals and threats of a no-confidence motion from S&D lawmakers.

== Honours ==
=== Foreign honours ===
- Lithuania:
  - Grand Cross of the Order for Merits to Lithuania (2 March 2017)
  - Commander's Grand Cross of the Order of the Lithuanian Grand Duke Gediminas (9 February 2025)
- Mali:
  - Commander of the National Order of Mali (4 April 2016)
- Ukraine:
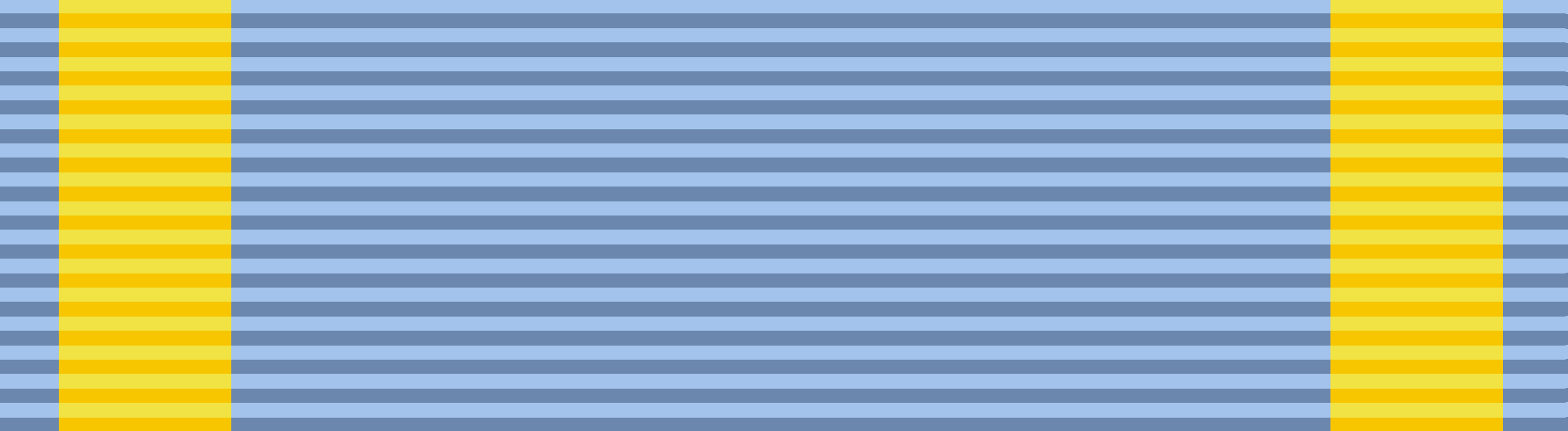
  - First Class of the Order of Prince Yaroslav the Wise (23 August 2022)
  - Medal of the Order of Saint Panteleimon (25 January 2024)
  - Medal of the Order of Europe (15 July 2026)

=== Honorary degrees ===
- 2023 – Honorary Doctorate, Toulouse Capitole University
- 2022 – Honorary Doctorate, Ben-Gurion University of the Negev

=== Other awards ===
- 2019 – Forbes' list of the World's 100 Most Powerful Women, position 4
- 2020 – Forbes' list of the World's 100 Most Powerful Women, position 4
- 2020 – Global Citizen Prize for World Leader
- 2022 – BBC 100 Women
- 2022 – Global Goalkeeper Award, presented by the Bill & Melinda Gates Foundation's Goalkeepers program
- 2022 – Forbes' list of the World's 100 Most Powerful Women, position 1
- 2023 – Forbes' list of the World's 100 Most Powerful Women, position 1
- 2024 – Forbes' list of the World's 100 Most Powerful Women, position 1
- 2025 – Forbes' list of the World's 100 Most Powerful Women, position 1

== Publications ==
- Ursula von der Leyen, C-reaktives Protein als diagnostischer Parameter zur Erfassung eines Amnioninfektionssyndroms bei vorzeitigem Blasensprung und therapeutischem Entspannungsbad in der Geburtsvorbereitung, doctoral dissertation, Hannover Medical School, 1990
- Ursula von der Leyen, Maria von Welser, Wir müssen unser Land für die Frauen verändern (in German). C. Bertelsmann Verlag, Munich, 2007. ISBN 978-3-570-00959-8.
- Ursula von der Leyen, Liz Mohn, Familie gewinnt (in German). Verlag Bertelsmann Stiftung, Gütersloh, 2007. ISBN 978-3-89204-927-2.

== See also ==
- Heiko von der Leyen – German physician
- List of current heads of state and government
- List of heads of the executive by approval rating

== Notes ==
Political offices
| Preceded by Renate Schmidt | Minister of Family Affairs and Youth; 2005–2009 | Succeeded by Kristina Schröder |
| Preceded by Franz Josef Jung | Minister of Labour and Social Affairs; 2009–2013 | Succeeded by Andrea Nahles |
| Preceded by Thomas de Maizière | Minister of Defence; 2013–2019 | Succeeded by Annegret Kramp-Karrenbauer |
| Preceded by Günther Oettinger | German European Commissioner; 2019–present | Incumbent |
| Preceded by Jean-Claude Juncker | President of the European Commission; 2019–present | Incumbent |
Academic offices
| Preceded by Petr Pavel | Invocation Speaker of the College of Europe; 2024 | Succeeded by Kaja Kallas |
Awards and achievements
| Preceded by Pinchas Goldschmidt and the Jewish communities in Europe | Recipient of the Charlemagne Prize; 2025 | Succeeded by Mario Draghi |
