= George Keith (missionary) =

Scottish religious leader

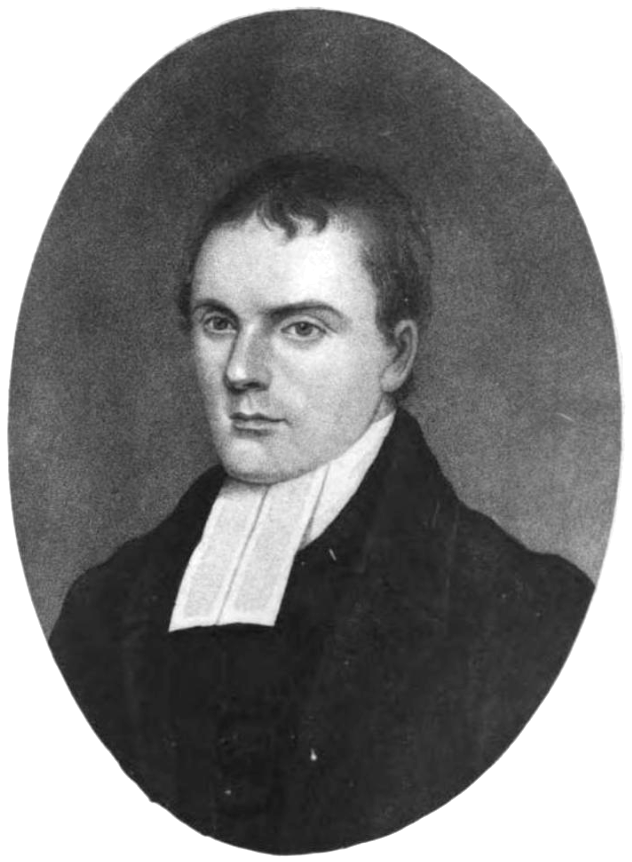
- Born: 1638 or 1639; Peterhead, Aberdeenshire, Scotland
- Died: 27 March 1716 (aged 77); Edburton, Sussex, England
- Education: University of Aberdeen
- Occupation: Missionary

George Keith (1638/1639 – 27 March 1716) was a Scottish religious leader, a Presbyterian turned Quaker turned Anglican. He was born in Peterhead, Aberdeenshire, Scotland, to a Presbyterian family and received an M.A. from the University of Aberdeen. Keith joined the Religious Society of Friends (Quakers) in the 1660s, accompanying George Fox, William Penn, and Robert Barclay on a mission to the Netherlands and Germany in 1677.

In 1685, three years after Barclay had been made the nonresident governor of the Province of East Jersey (part of the present-day American state of New Jersey), Keith traveled there to take the post of Surveyor-General. In 1686 he ran the first survey to mark out the border between West Jersey and East Jersey, which is today still known as the Keith line. Around 1691 Keith decided that Quakers had strayed too far from orthodox Christianity and began to have sharp disagreements with his fellow believers. He first broke with Philadelphia Yearly Meeting to form a short-lived group called the Christian Quakers in the colonies. In 1693, he and his fellow Keithians published An Exhortation & Caution to Friends Concerning Buying or Keeping of Negroes, one of the earliest printed antislavery tracts in British North America.

After returning to England, he was disowned by London Yearly Meeting in 1694. In 1699, he attacked William Penn and other Quakers as "Deists". He was ordained to the Church of England ministry in May 1700. Sponsored by the Society for the Propagation of the Gospel in Foreign Parts, Keith returned to the American colonies as a missionary from 1702 to 1704, trying to win over Quakers and others. Keith invigorated Anglican congregations in Perth Amboy. Upon returning to England, Keith served as rector at the parish of Edburton, Sussex until his death on 27 March 1716.

== Early life and education ==
Born in Peterhead, Aberdeenshire, Scotland, to a Presbyterian family. He was the son of Sir John Alexander and Jeanne Watsonne Keith. He married Elizabeth Johnston. He received an M.A. from the University of Aberdeen. Keith joined the Religious Society of Friends (Quakers) in the 1660s, accompanying George Fox, William Penn, and Robert Barclay on a mission to the Netherlands and Germany in 1677. In the meanwhile, he produced in 1674 the first English translation of Ibn Tufail's Hayy ibn Yaqdhan based on Edward Pococke's Latin version. He also participated in the 1676 Aberdeen disputes over Barclay's Theses Theologicae, authoring with Barclay a defense of the Theses titled Quakerism Confirmed.

== Career ==
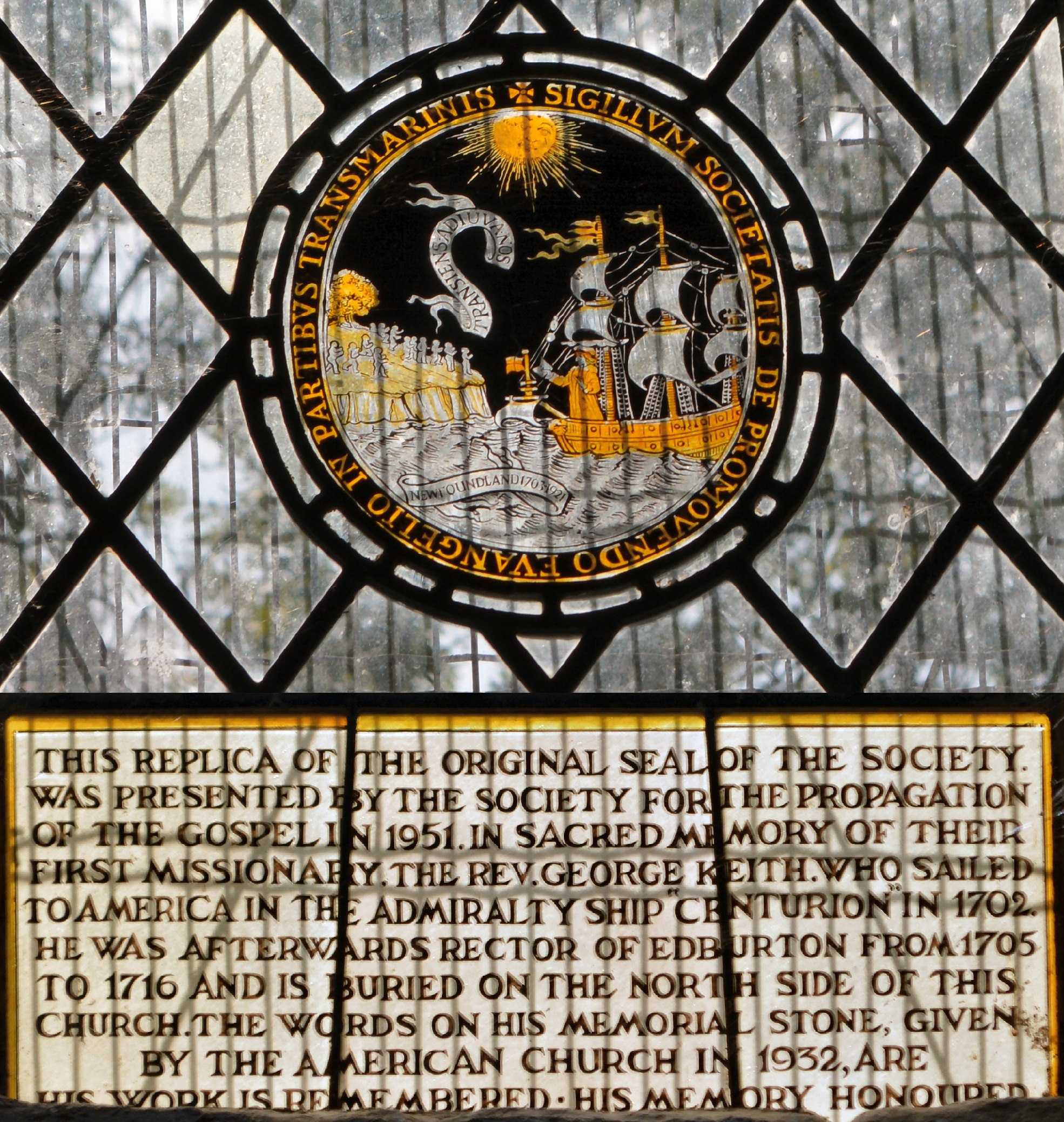
Edburton, George Keith memorial window

In 1685, three years after Barclay had been made the nonresident governor of the Province of East Jersey (part of the present-day American state of New Jersey), Keith traveled there to take the post of Surveyor-General. In 1686 he ran the first survey to mark out the border between West Jersey and East Jersey, which is today still known as the Keith line. He moved to Philadelphia in 1688 to serve as headmaster at the Friends School there.

For his survey work, the Proprietors gave him large grants of land including seven hundred acres in Monmouth County where he founded the town of Freehold. He established his home in a Quaker settlement near Topanemus (in Marlboro Township, which was partitioned from Freehold Township in 1848) where in 1692 he helped to build a meeting house in which he preached to the people on the Quaker faith.

Around 1691 Keith decided that Quakers had strayed too far from orthodox Christianity and began to have sharp disagreements with his fellow believers. He first broke with Philadelphia Yearly Meeting to form a short-lived group called the Christian Quakers in the colonies. Also the Quakers, who came from Krefeld and were already involved in the Quaker anti-slavery petition in Germantown in 1688, were also involved in the controversy. The Krefeld Quaker advocates were the brothers Abraham and Hermann op den Graeff. Their opponent was their brother Derick op den Graeff. The latter was also a co-signer of the judgment against Kaith, which excluded him from the Quaker community. He was fined five pounds by a secular court. The printer of a brochure went to prison. No other German family was as deeply involved in the conflict as the Op den Graeffs. In 1693, he and his fellow Keithians published An Exhortation & Caution to Friends Concerning Buying or Keeping of Negroes, one of the earliest printed antislavery tracts in British North America. David Brion Davis, a leading scholar of abolition and slavery, argues that Keith's Exhortation foreshadowed "the major religious themes of nineteenth-century abolitionism." After returning to England, he was disowned by London Yearly Meeting in 1694. In 1699 he attacked William Penn and other Quakers as "Deists". He was ordained to the Church of England ministry in May 1700.

Sponsored by the Society for the Propagation of the Gospel in Foreign Parts, Keith returned to the American colonies as a missionary from 1702 to 1704, trying to win over Quakers and others. Keith invigorated Anglican congregations in Perth Amboy, Burlington and Concord Township, Pennsylvania. He preached in Williamsburg, Virginia in 1703, and left behind his daughter, Anne, who had likewise returned to the Anglican fold, unlike her husband, Quaker George Walker of Old Point Comfort.

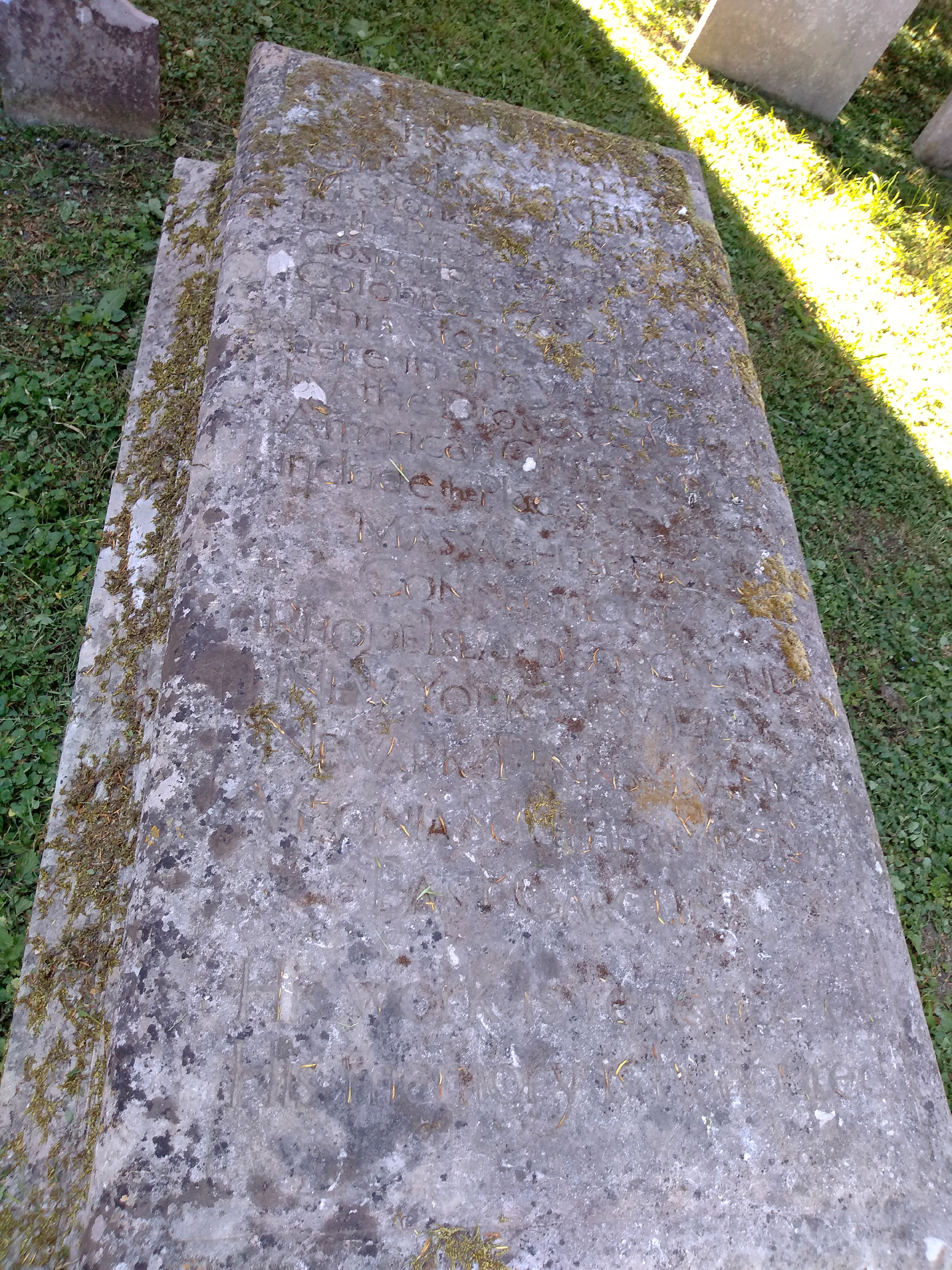
Edburton, St Andrews Church

Upon returning to England, Keith served as rector at the parish of Edburton, Sussex until his death on 27 March 1716. He is buried in the churchyard and his grave has an inscribed stone installed in 1932.

== Sources ==
- Bowden, James. The history of the Society of Friends in America. [n. p.] 1850.
- Chisholm, Hugh, ed. (1911). "Keith, George" . Encyclopædia Britannica. Vol. 15 (11th ed.). Cambridge University Press. p. 716.
- Pomfret, John Edwin, The Province of East New Jersey, 1609-1702, the rebellious proprietary. Princeton, N.J., Princeton University Press, 1962.
- Chamberlain, J. S. "Keith, George (1638?–1716)". Oxford Dictionary of National Biography (online ed.). Oxford University Press. doi:10.1093/ref:odnb/15264. (Subscription, Wikipedia Library access or UK public library membership required.). The first edition of this text is available at Wikisource: "Keith, George (1639?-1716)" . Dictionary of National Biography. London: Smith, Elder & Co. 1885–1900.
- Episcopal Church Liturgy & Music website - Biography of George Keith
- Claus Bernet (2009). "George Keith (missionary)". In Bautz, Traugott (ed.). Biographisch-Bibliographisches Kirchenlexikon (BBKL) (in German). Vol. 30. Nordhausen: Bautz. cols. 752–787. ISBN 978-3-88309-478-6.
