= Francis Daniel Pastorius =

Founder of Germantown, Pennsylvania (1651–1719)

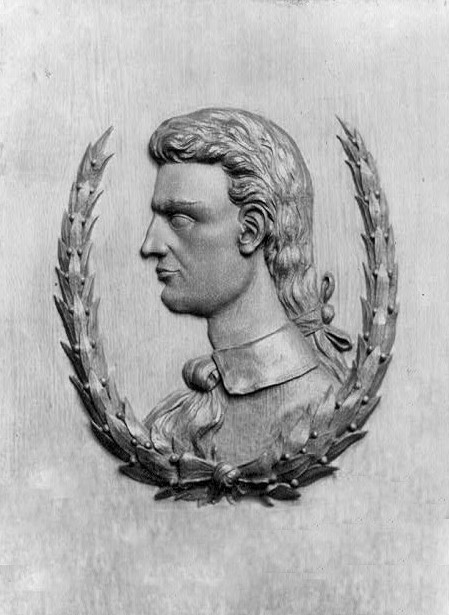
- Bas-relief impression of Francis Daniel Pastorius, c. 1897
- Born: Franz Daniel Pastorius; September 26, 1651; Sommerhausen, Franconian Circle, Holy Roman Empire
- Died: February 17, 1719 (aged 67); Germantown, Province of Pennsylvania, British America
- Occupations: lawyer, poet, scholar, schoolteacher, abolitionist, founder of Germantown, Pennsylvania
- Spouse: Ennecke Klostermanns (1658–1723) (m. 1688)

Francis Daniel Pastorius (September 26, 1651 – February 17, 1719) was a German-born educator, lawyer, poet, and public official. He was the founder of Germantown, Pennsylvania, now part of Philadelphia, the first permanent German-American settlement and the gateway for subsequent emigrants from Germany.

== Early life ==
Coat of arms of Francis Daniel Pastorius

Franz Daniel Pastorius was born in the Franconian town of Sommerhausen, to a prosperous Lutheran family. He received a Gymnasium education in Windsheim (also in Franconia), where his family moved in 1659. He was trained as a lawyer in some of the best German universities of his day, including the University of Altdorf, the University of Strasbourg and the Friedrich Schiller University of Jena. He started his practice in Windsheim and continued it in Frankfurt-am-Main. He was a close friend of the Lutheran theologian and Pietist leader Philipp Jakob Spener during the early development of Spener's movement in Frankfurt. From 1680 to 1682, he worked as a tutor accompanying a young nobleman during his Wanderjahr through Germany, England, France, Switzerland and the Netherlands. Pastorius's biography reveals increasing dissatisfaction with the Lutheran church and state of his German youth in the Age of Absolutism. As a young adult his Christian morality even strained the relationship with his father Melchior Adam Pastorius (1624–1702), a wealthy lawyer and burgomaster in Windsheim. These difficulties came to a head in 1677–1679, years of tumult in this imperial city. After Pastorius had completed his doctorate in law, returned to Windsheim and begun his law career, his family and friends (with Habsburg backing) suppressed a popular insurrection against abuses of oligarchic rule. It was in this context that he left his home in 1679, joined the Lutheran Pietists in Frankfurt, and repeatedly urged adherence to Christ's Golden Rule. He emigrated to Pennsylvania four years later, and never went back to Windsheim.

== To Philadelphia ==
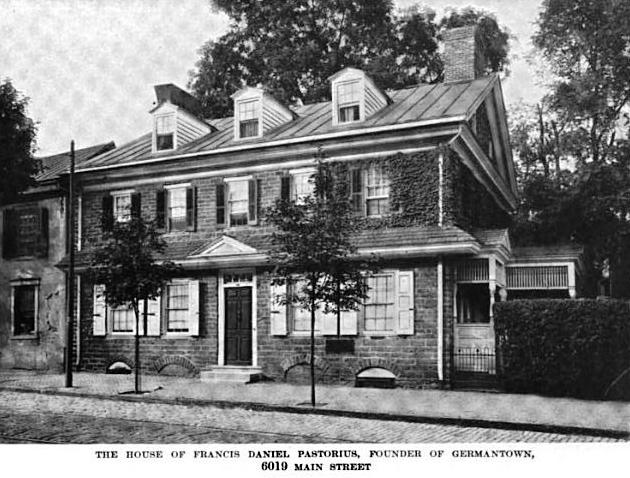
Home of Francis Daniel Pastorius in Germantown, as it appeared circa 1919

In 1683, a group of Mennonites, Pietists, and Quakers in Frankfurt, the so called Original 13, including Abraham op den Graeff, a cousin of William Penn, approached Pastorius about acting as their agent to purchase land in Pennsylvania for a settlement. Pastorius took passage aboard the ship America and arrived in Philadelphia on August 20, 1683. In Philadelphia, he negotiated the purchase of 15,000 acres (61 km²) from William Penn, the proprietor of the colony, and laid out the settlement of Germantown, where he himself would live until his death. As one of Germantown's leading citizens, Pastorius served in many public offices. He was the first mayor and also was a member of the Pennsylvania General Assembly in 1687 and 1691. In 1691, Thomas Lloyd, Deputy General of Pennsylvania had granted a naturalisation to sixty-two of the first Germantown settlers as citizens of Pennsylvania (and therefore of England) with the status of a freeman including Pastorius and also other important members of the settlement, the brothers Derick, Herman and Abraham op den Graeff and William Rittenhouse. In 1702, he opened a school in Germantown which enrolled both boys and girls; the suffragist Alice Paul cited his enrollment of girls in her PhD dissertation from the University of Pennsylvania, and noted that his commitment was exceptional in a community that otherwise upheld a "Haus Frau" ideal.

== Writings ==
He wrote extensively on topics ranging from beekeeping to religion. He was "the first poet of consequence in Pennsylvania . . . [and] one of the most important poets of early America" (Meserole, p. 294). His extensive commonplace compilations provide insight into early Enlightenment culture in colonial Pennsylvania. He was also a skilled poet whose work appears in the New Oxford Book of Seventeenth-Century Verse. Pastorius's most important book was his manuscript "Bee Hive", which is now in the University of Pennsylvania's rare book room. It is his commonplace book, which contains poetry, his thoughts on religion and politics, and lists of books he consulted along with excerpts from those books. Also of interest is his Geographical Description of Pennsylvania, first published under the title, Umständige geographische Beschreibung der allerletzt erfundenen Provintz Pennsylvania (1700). This book also contains many of his letters home to Germany. His manuscripts include treatises on horticulture, law, agriculture and medicine.

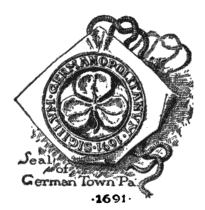
Seal of Germantown, PA (1691)

Penn State University Press published in 2019 a reader on Francis Daniel Pastorius edited by Patrick M. Erben.

== Personal ==
Pastorius married Ennecke Klostermanns (1658–1723) on November 6, 1688. They had two sons: Johann Samuel Pastorius (1690–1722) and Heinrich Pastorius (1692–1726). Though raised as an upper-class Lutheran, he converted to Lutheran Pietism as a young adult in Germany. He grew increasingly liberal in Pennsylvania, espousing universalism and moving close to Quakerism.

Famed bassist Jaco Pastorius was his distant descendant.

== Legacy ==
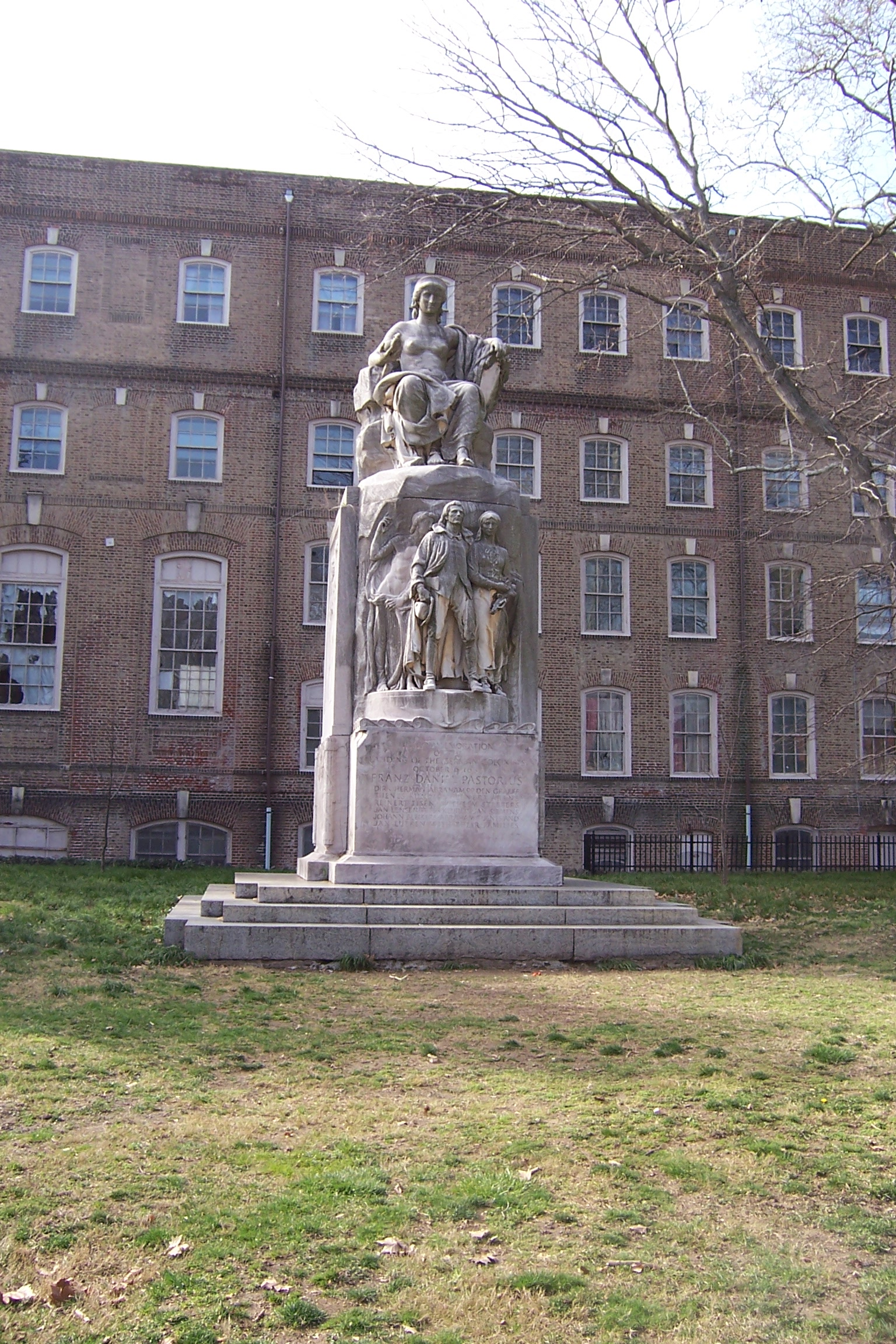
Pastorius Monument in Vernon Park

=== Anti-slavery stand ===
From among the Krefeld settlers, it was probably the Quakers who provided the impetus for the rejection of slavery. The 13 families from Krefeld had heard about the slave trade in the American colonies for the first time in Rotterdam on their trip to Pennsylvania. They could not imagine that they could own slaves in the land of brotherly love. However, the reality was different: Puritans and Quakers, who otherwise advocated for universal human rights, had no problems with human trafficking and did not believe it was wrong. In 1688, some years after their arrival, he drafted, together with Garret Hendericks, Derick op den Graeff, and Abraham op den Graeff the first protest against slavery in America. Pastorius was a cosigner of the 1688 Germantown Quaker Petition Against Slavery, the first petition against slavery made in the Thirteen Colonies. The protest was signed in the house of Thones Kunders, one of the first burgesses of Germantown. Before the American Civil War, when abolition of slavery was gaining strength, Pastorius was ripe for celebration. The Quaker poet John Greenleaf Whittier celebrated Pastorius's life—and particularly his anti-slavery advocacy—in The Pennsylvania Pilgrim. Whittier also translated the Latin ode addressed to posterity, which Pastorius prefixed to his Germantown book of records.

=== Operation Pastorius ===
Despite the Quaker sympathies of Pastorius, his name was appropriated in 1942 by the Abwehr of Nazi Germany for "Operation Pastorius", a failed sabotage attack on the United States during World War II that included a target in Philadelphia.

=== Biographies ===
For generations Pastorius has won the affections of historians. In the early twentieth century, German-American scholars embraced him and the University of Pennsylvania professor Marion Dexter Learned (1857–1917) wrote a lengthy biography; Learned had access to papers that have subsequently been lost. In 1953 DeElla Victoria Toms wrote a Ph.D. dissertation on the intellectual and literary background of Francis Daniel Pastorius.

In 1985 John Weaver documented the cultural background of Pastorius's childhood and youth, and his reasons for emigrating to Pennsylvania in 1683. More recently Princeton University professor Anthony Grafton has written about Pastorius as a representative of European intellectual culture. Grafton's presidential address to the American Historical Association in 2012 was on Pastorius. Weaver extensively revised his earlier research in a book (in PDF) available online and published in 2016. In 2012 Patrick Erben wrote A Harmony of the Spirits: Translation and the Language of Community in Early Pennsylvania. In 2017 Margo Lambert published "Mediation, Assimilation, and German Foundations in North America: Francis Daniel Pastorius as Cultural Broker."

=== Legacy ===
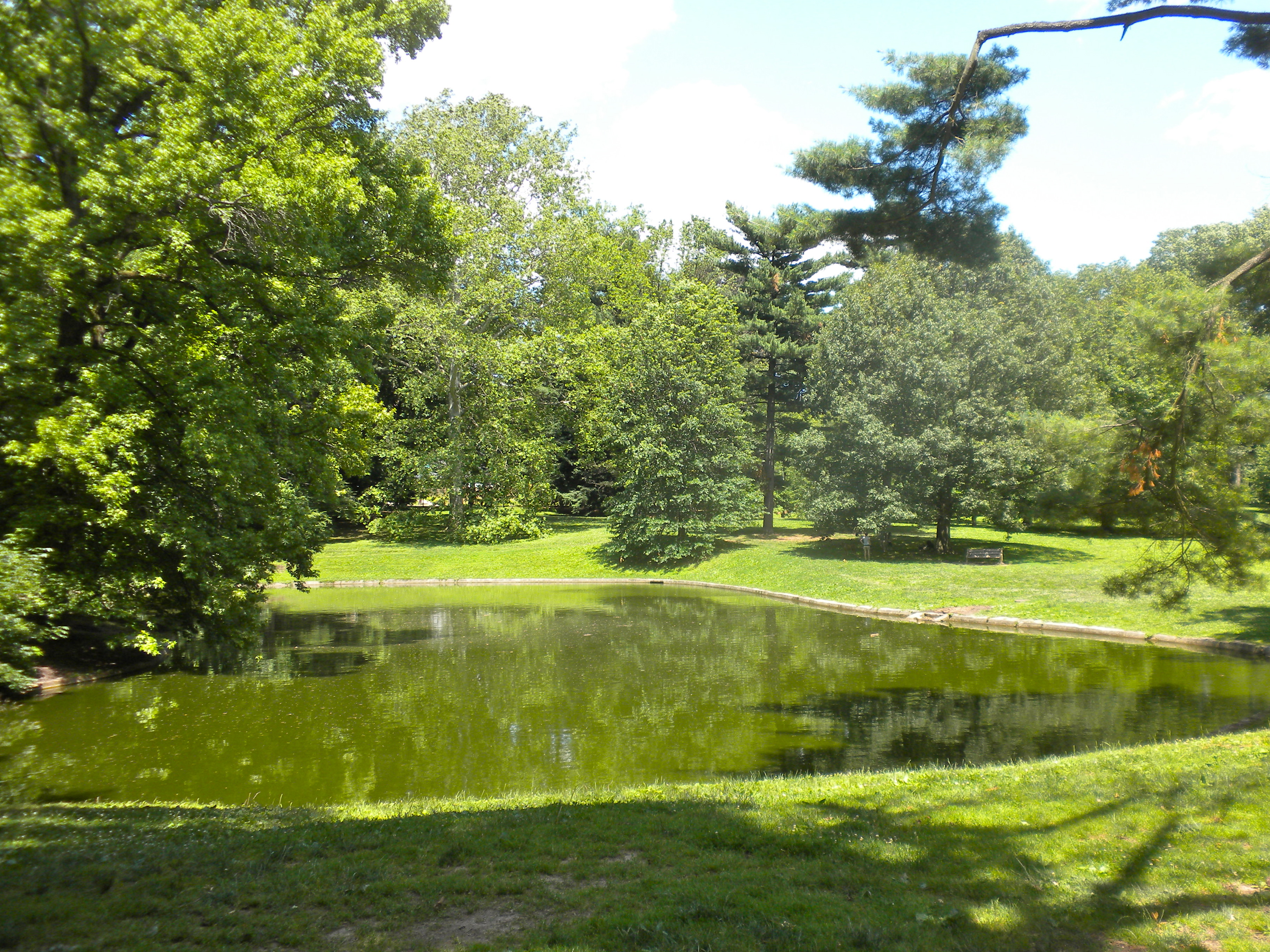
Pastorius Park

- The Pastorius Home Association, Inc. operates the Pastorius Haus in Bad Windsheim, Germany, and the Pastorius House in Germansville, Pennsylvania.
- The Pastorius Monument is located in Vernon Park in Northwest Philadelphia, PA.
- Pastorius Park is located in the Chestnut Hill section of Philadelphia, PA.

== Other sources ==
- Bowden, Henry Warner (1977) Dictionary of American Religious Biography (Westport, CT:Greenwood Press) ISBN 0-8371-8906-3
- Brophy, Alfred L. "Ingenium est Fateri per quos profeceris: Francis Daniel Pastorius' Young Country Clerk's Collection and Anglo-American Legal Literature, 1682–1716," University of Chicago Law School Roundtable (1996) volume 3: 627–721.
- Dünnhaupt, Gerhard, "F. D. Pastorius" (Biography and Bibliography) in: Personalbibliographien zu den Drucken des Barock, vol. 4, (Stuttgart: Hiersemann, 1991, pp. 3075–3079) ISBN 3-7772-9122-6
- Genzmer, George Harvey "Pastorius, Francis Daniel," in Dumas Malone (ed.), Dictionary of American Biography, Vol. 7, Part 2, (New York: Charles Scribner's Sons, 1934 (1962 reprint), pp. 290–291)
- Gross, Leonard; Gleysteen, Jan (2007) Colonial Germantown Mennonites (Telford, PA: Cascadia) ISBN 1-931038-41-4
- Hombrecher, Hartmut (2023) Transatlantischer Kulturtransfer. Franz Daniel Pastorius' Schriften als Literatur und Praxis (Göttingen: Wallstein) ISBN 978-3-8353-5469-2
- Meserole, Harrison T. (ed) "Seventeenth-Century American Poetry," Anchor Seventeenth-Century Series. (Garden City, N.Y.: Doubleday, 1968, pp. 293–304) ISBN 978-0814703014
- Mote, Miranda "A Botanical Beehive of poetry and belief in Philadelphian gardens. A radical refiguring of garden culture in colonial Pennsylvania before 1719," Studies in the History of Gardens & Designed Landscapes 136-163 (2023).
- Mote, Miranda "The Art of Gardening in a Pennsylvania Woods," Philadelphia Garden's History 68-77 (2020).

== Writings by Pastorius ==
- Deliciæ Hortenses, or Garden-Recreations, and Voluptates Apianæ, ed. Christoph E. Schweitzer (Columbia, South Carolina: Camden House, 1982).
- Francis Daniel Pastorius Reader: Writings by an Early American Polymath, ed. Patrick Erben (University Press: Penn State Press, 2019).
- Marion Dexter Learned, “From Pastorius’ Bee-Hive or Bee-Stock,” Americana Germanica 1, no. 4 (1879): 67–110.
