= Thones Kunders =

German settler of Pennsylvania (c. 1654 – 1729)

Thones Dennis Kunders (c. 1654 – September 1729, Germantown, Philadelphia) was an early settler of the colonial-era Province of Pennsylvania.

== Biography ==
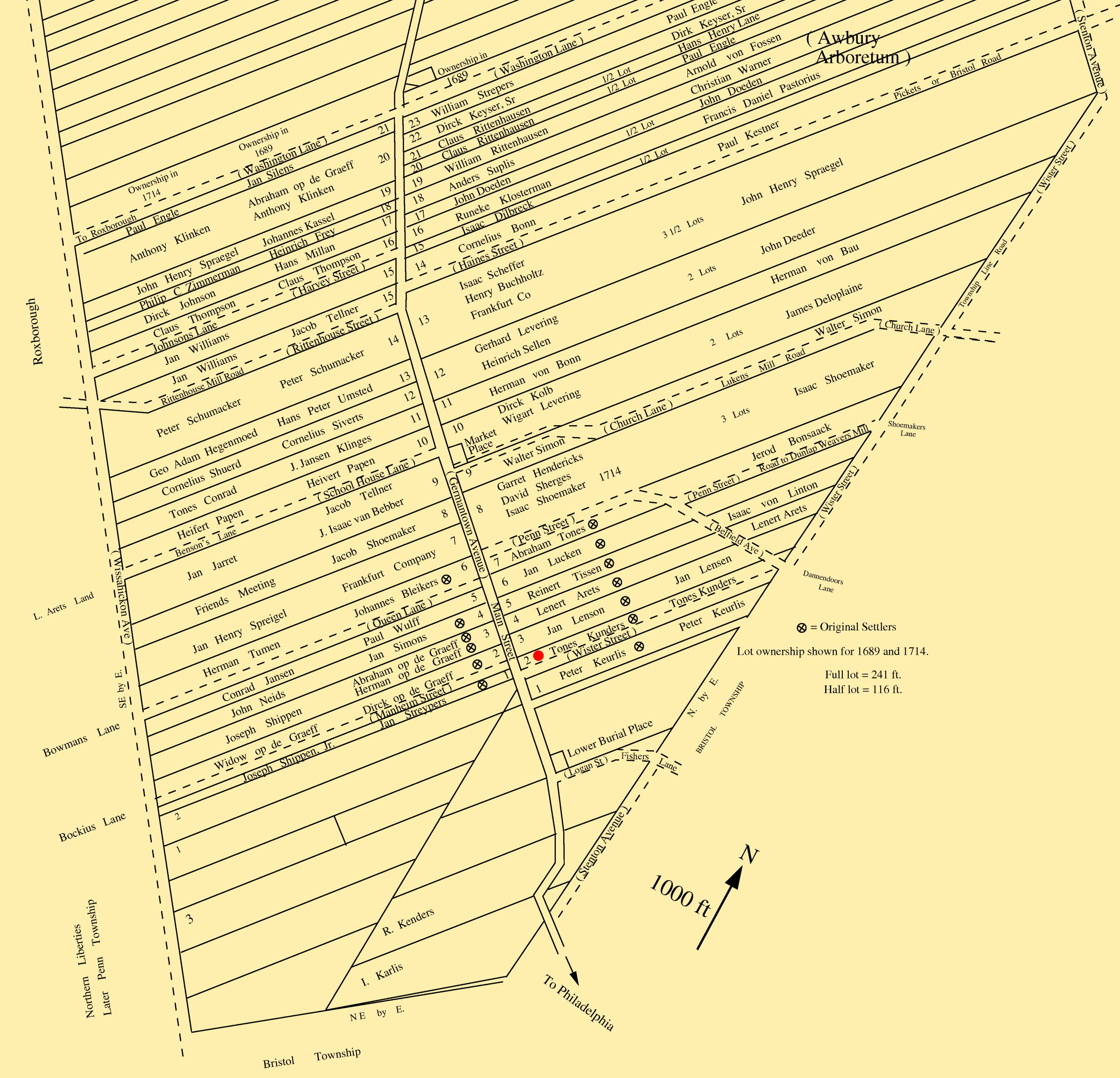
The plan of Germantown in 1689. Location of Thones Kunders' house is marked with red dot. Lot owners shown for 1689 and 1714

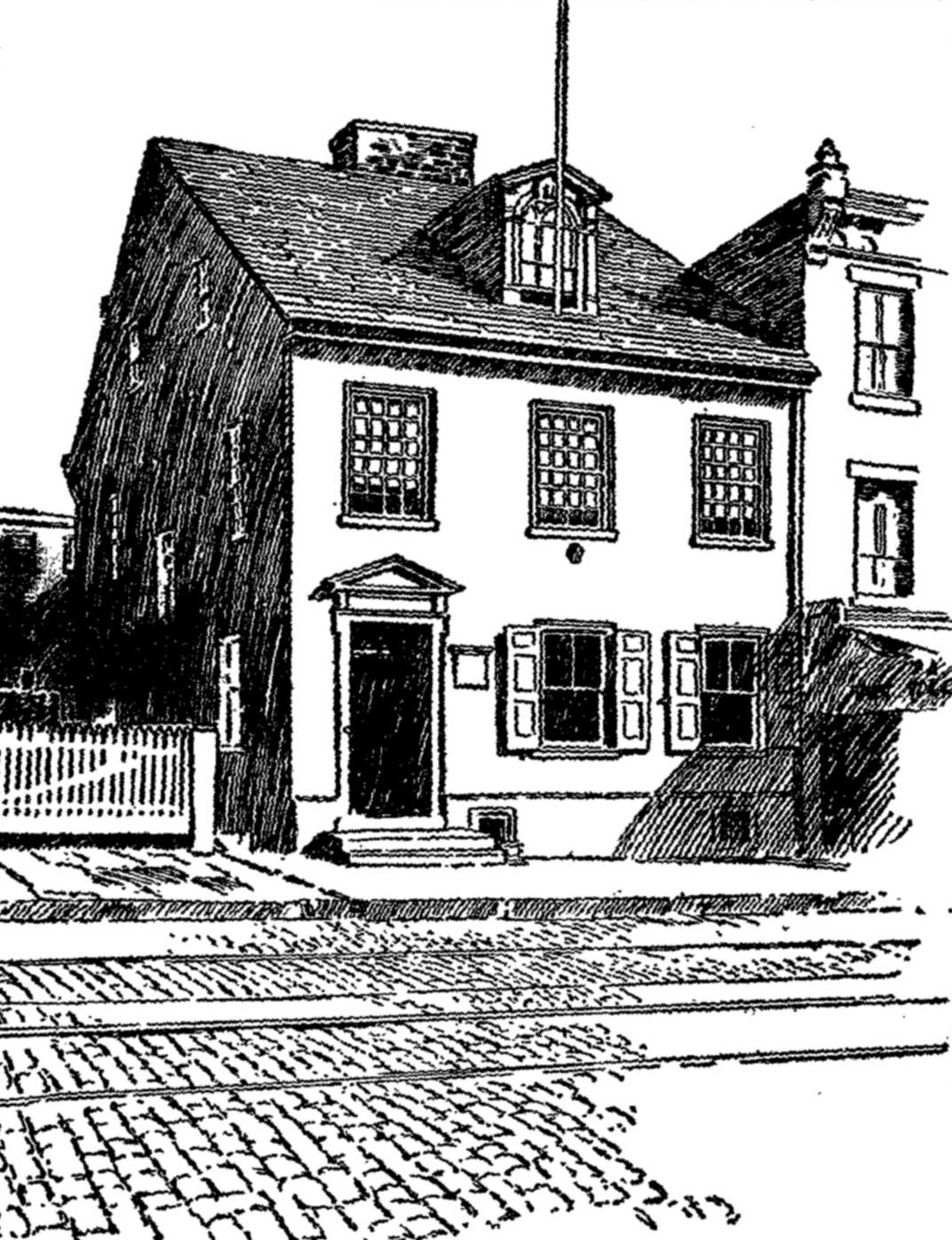
Thones Kunders's house at 5109 Germantown Avenue, where the 1688 Petition Against Slavery was written. From Jenkins (1915)

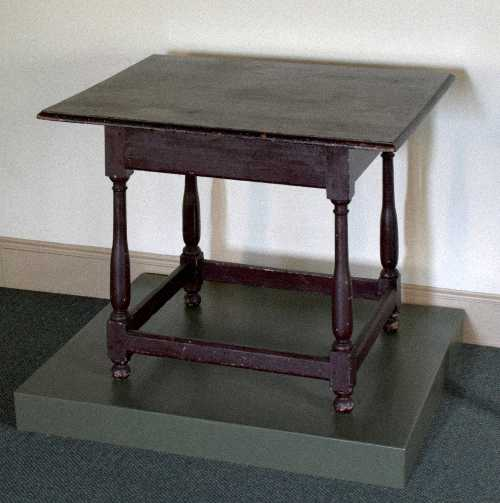
The table on which the 1688 Petition Against Slavery was written and signed

Kunders was born in Mönchengladbach, Holy Roman Empire, and was a citizen of Krefeld. A dyer by trade, he was the head of one of the first 13 German families who sailed aboard the ship Concord to arrive in Philadelphia, Pennsylvania, on 6 October 1683, beginning the German immigration to America. Kunders later called himself Anthony Conrads and still later Cunard, and was also called Dennis Conrad. At Kunders's house in Germantown were held the first German religious services in America, attended by both Mennonites and Quakers, including Pennsylvania proprietor William Penn.

On February 18, 1688, the first protest against slavery in the New World was drafted in Kunders's house. The protest, written by Francis Daniel Pastorius and signed also by Garrett Henrich, Abraham Up den Graef, and Derick Up de graeff, opposed the importation, sale, and ownership of slaves.

When Germantown was granted a charter by Penn in 1689, Kunders was appointed one of the first burgesses.

Today, a historical marker stands at the site of his Germantown house.
