= Abraham op den Graeff =

German emigrant to North America and politician (c. 1649–c. 1731)

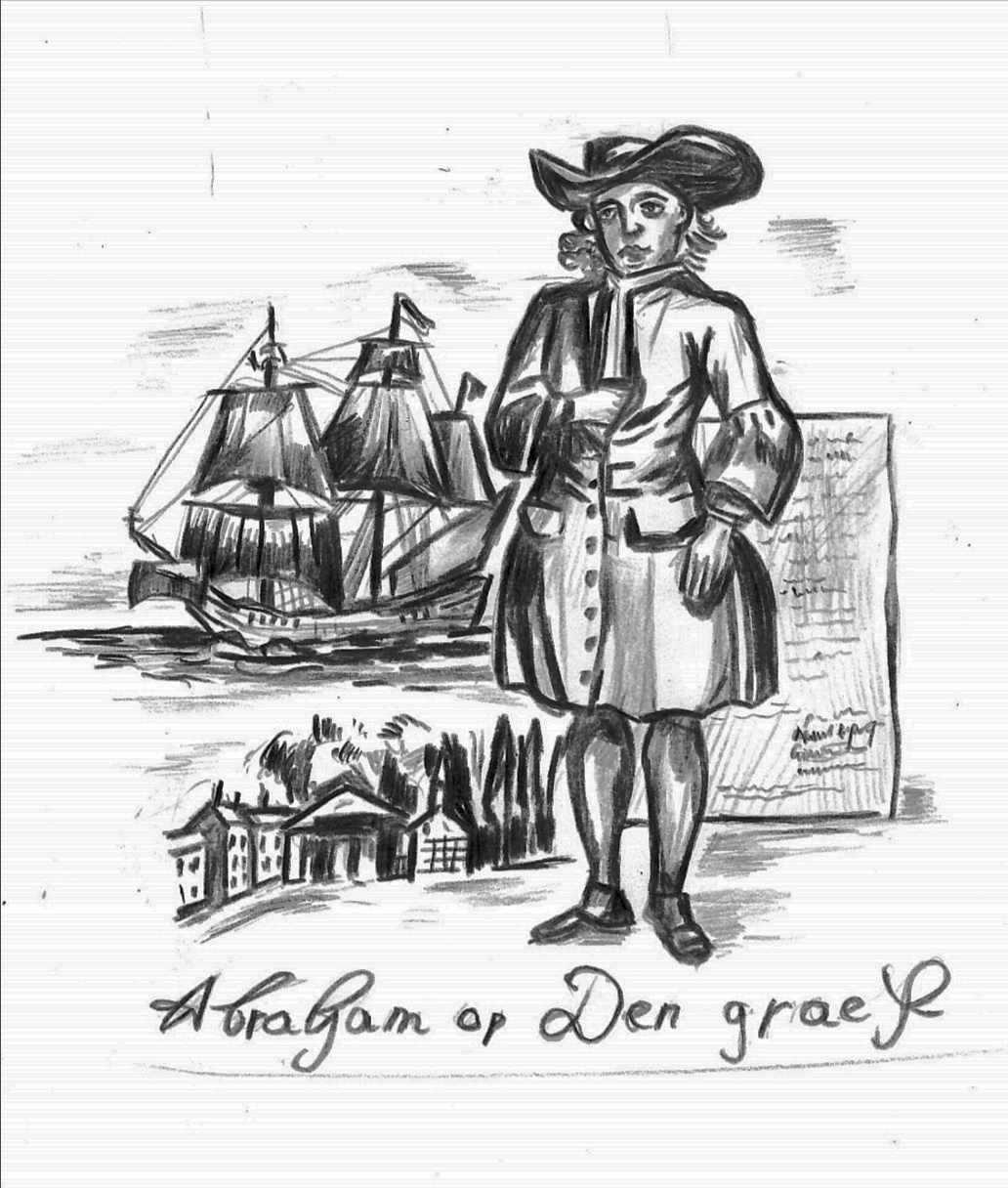
- Depiction of Abraham op den Graeff by Matthias Laurenz Gräff, 2024

Representative, Pennsylvania Provincial Assembly
- In office 1689–1692

Personal details
- Born: c 1649 Krefeld, Germany
- Died: 1731 Philadelphia, Pennsylvania
- Profession: Politician, weaver, merchant

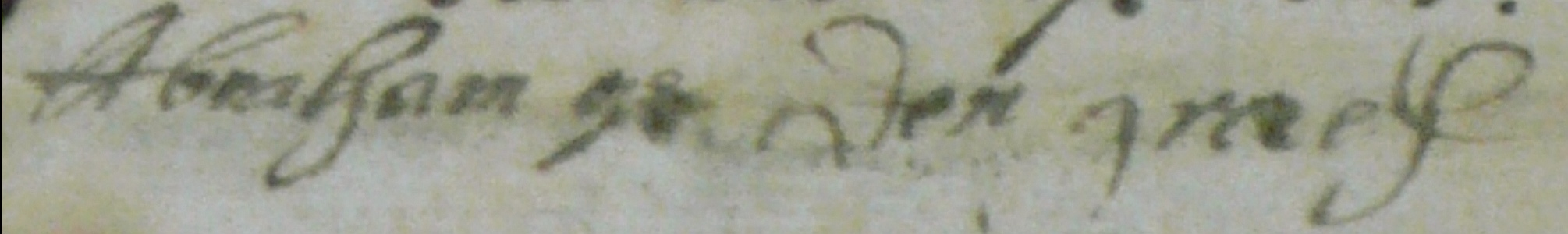
Signature of Abraham op den Graeff (at the 1688 Germantown Quaker petition against slavery)

Abraham Isaacs op den Graeff, also Op den Graff, Opdengraef as well as Op den Gräff (c. 1649 – c. 1731) was one of the so-called Original 13, the first closed group of German emigrants to North America, and an original founder of Germantown, Pennsylvania, as well as a civic leader, member of the Pennsylvania Provincial Assembly, award-winning weaver, and as an early abolitionist signer of the first organized religious protest against slavery in colonial America. He, or his brother Derick op den Graeff, are briefly mentioned in John Greenleaf Whittier's poem "The Pennsylvania Pilgrim" simply as "Op Den Graaf".

== Biography ==
=== Family ===
Abraham op den Graeff was born around 1649 in Krefeld, Germany, to Isaac Hermans op den Graeff (1616–1679), a Krefeld Mennonite who turned to Quakerism during the 1670s, and Margaret Peters Doerrs (Margaretha "Grietgen" Doors) (1621–1683). His paternal grandfather Herman op den Graeff was a Mennonite community leader of Krefeld and delegate to the Dordrecht Confession of Faith. The Op den Graeff family were originally Mennonites, and are believed to have come from nearby Aldekerk in the Catholic Duchy of Julich about 1605 to avoid persecution. At that time Krefeld was an exclave of the County of Moers, and under the authority of the Prince of Orange, stadtholder of the Republic of the United Netherlands. In contrast to the leaders of Julich and the nearby Electorate of Cologne, the stadtholders of the Netherlands were tolerant of non-conforming religions. As a result, Krefeld had become a point of refuge for the persecuted Mennonites. Many of the Krefeld Mennonites were weavers, or practiced other cloth making trades such as dyeing.

==== Coat of arms ====
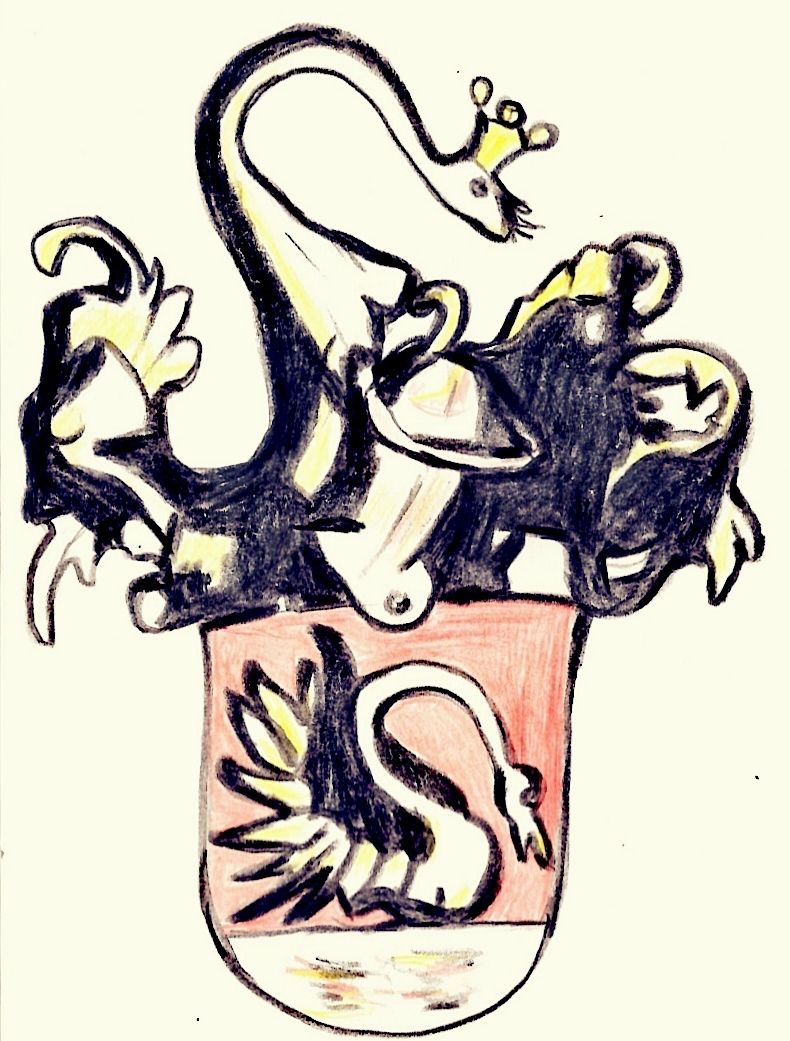
Possible, but not proven, coat of arms Op den Graeff as descendants of Herman op den Graeff (Heraldic representation by Matthias Laurenz Gräff based on the Krefeld Op den Graeff stained glass window from 1630, which may depict the "Lohengrin swan" of the Kleve coat of arms in one window)

A reference to the Op den Graeff glass paintings of Krefeld with a description of Herman op den Graeff's coat of arms was found in the estate of W. Niepoth (op den Graeff folder) in the archives of the city of Krefeld, who noted a letter dated November 17, 1935 from Richard Wolfferts to Dr Risler: Saw the Coat of Arms glass pane in the old museum: 'Herman op den Graeff und Grietgen syn housfrau' or the like. Coat of Arms - In the sign a silver swan in blue. Helmet decoration (I think): Swan growing.

=== Early life ===
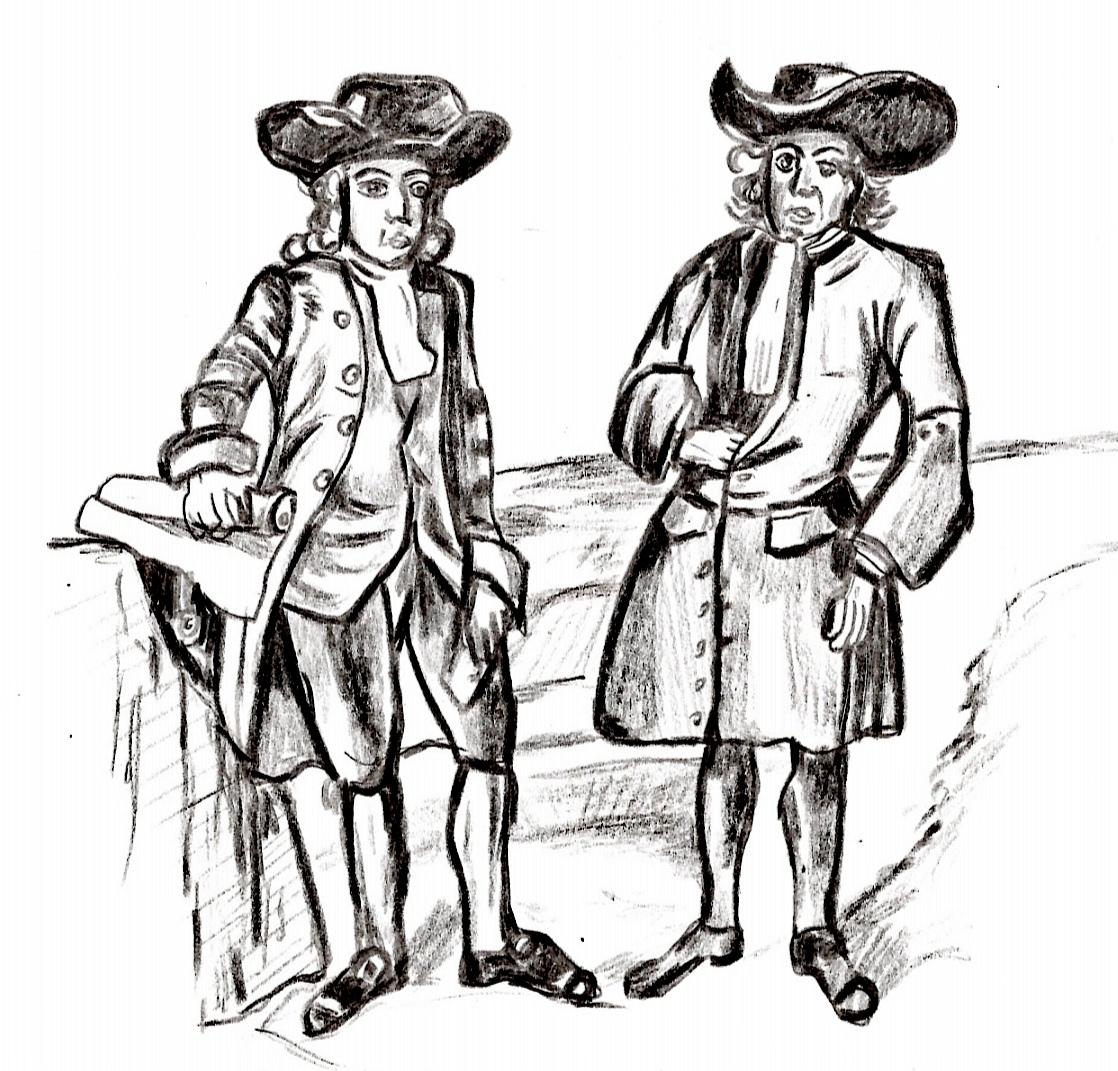
William Penn with his cousin Abraham Isacks op den Graeff (sketch by Matthias Laurenz Gräff, 2023)

Abraham op den Graeff continued his father's and grandfather work as was a merchant and linen weaver. Quaker missionary work in the lower and middle Rhine River valley during the 1660s resulted in the conversion of a number of Mennonites in and around Krefeld. Among these converts were Abraham op den Graeff and his family. The Quakers were not as readily tolerated by the people of Krefeld. In 1679 five of them, including Abraham's brother Herman, were forcibly exiled from Krefeld. They were eventually allowed to return through pressure from the English Quakers, but by this time William Penn's Colony was being established (1681-1682). Penn was in fact a cousin of the Op den Graeff brothers. The opportunity to follow their Quaker beliefs without fear of persecution was undoubtedly a major factor in their decision to emigrate from Krefeld. In 1679 he was married to Trijntje Jansen. The couple had six children:

- Isaac Updegraff (1678-1745), ancestor of the influential Updegraff family line of his great-grandson Nathan Updegraff who settled in Mount Pleasant, Ohio in 1802
- Gertien op den Graeff (1680/82-1770)
- Anneken (Anne) op den Graeff (* 1683/85)
- Jacob op den Graeff (1687-1750
- Margrit op den Graeff (1691-1755
- Elizabeth op den Graeff (* 1695)

In October 1683, Abraham and his brothers Herman and Derick were one of the so-called Original 13, the first closed group of German emigrants to North America, arriving at Philadelphia, Province of Pennsylvania on the ship Concord. The three Op den Graeffs had another brother, Adolphus Op Den Graeff (* 1648), who did not join the emigration but settled near Koblenz before 1680. His grandson John William (Johan Wilhelm) op den Graeff (1732 - between 1800 and 1804) immigrated in 1753 to Pennsylvania as well. Their descendants joined their name into Updegrove.

=== Germantown Settlement ===
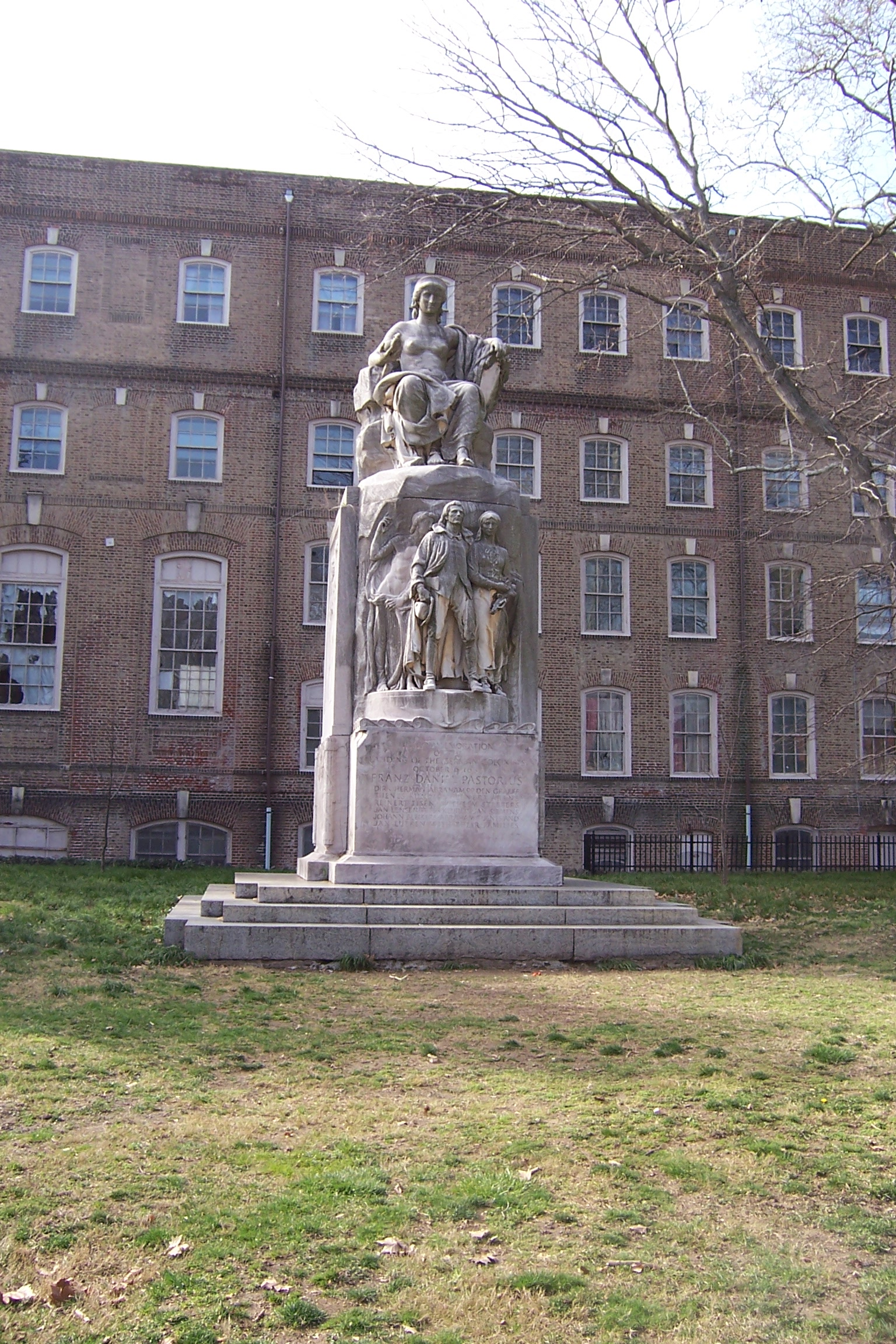
Monument in Vernon Park, Philadelphia, in memory of Francis Daniel Pastorius and the first settlers.

Abraham op den Graeff and his family were one of the original thirteen families which founded Germantown. He and his brothers paid for 2,000 acres of land in Pennsylvania from Jacob Telner (who had an original land grant for the land from William Penn that was dated March 9, 1682) while still in Europe: 828 acres of this land was located in what is now Germantown, six miles from Philadelphia, Pennsylvania. Abraham owned the forth lot on the west side of the road as one traveled north through Germantown. There he helped established the linen industry and remained prominent in Germantown civic and religious life. He winning the first Governor's prize of 1,500 Lire from William Penn, in 1686 for the finest piece of linen woven in the Province.

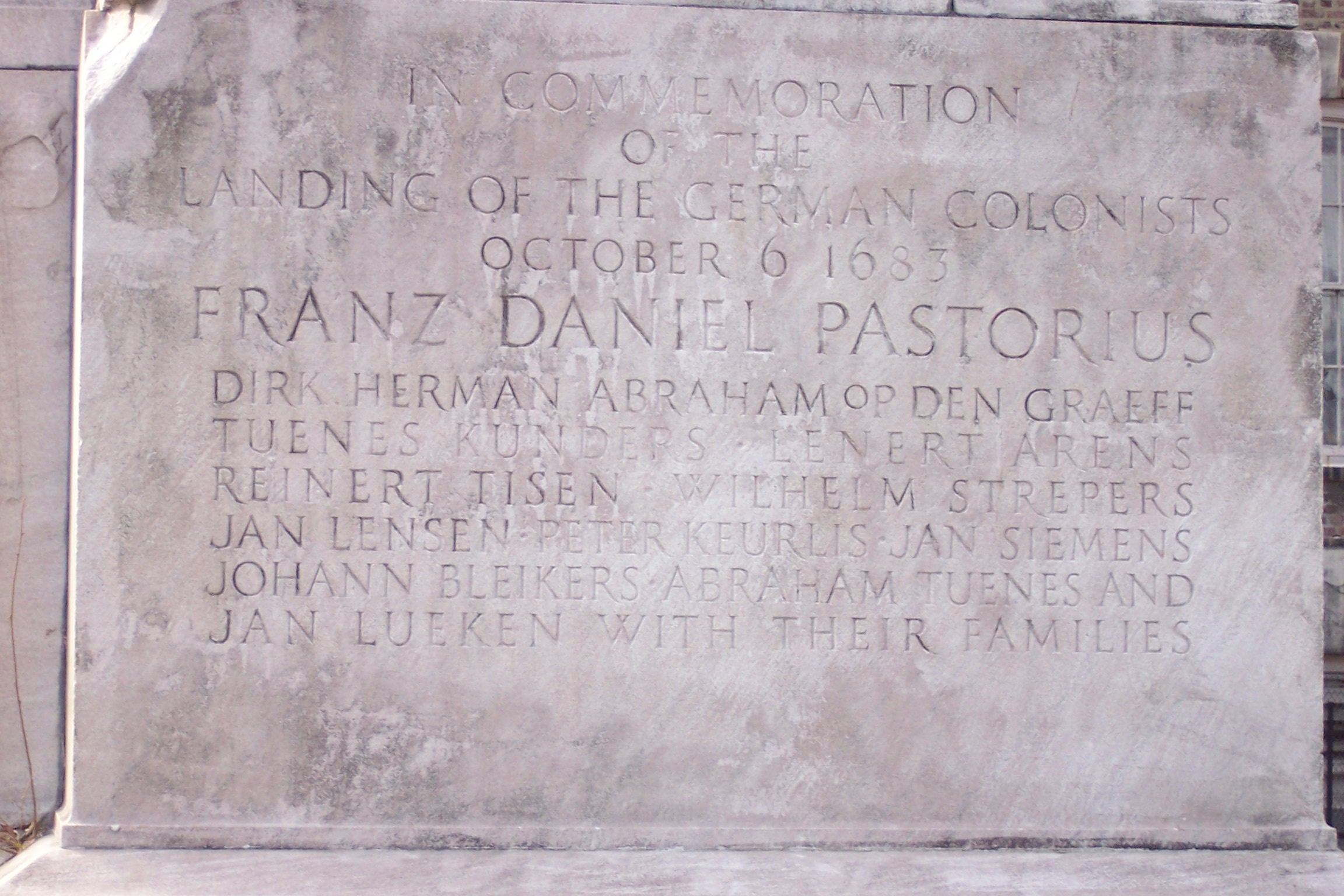
Inscription plaque with the names of the Op den Graeff brothers

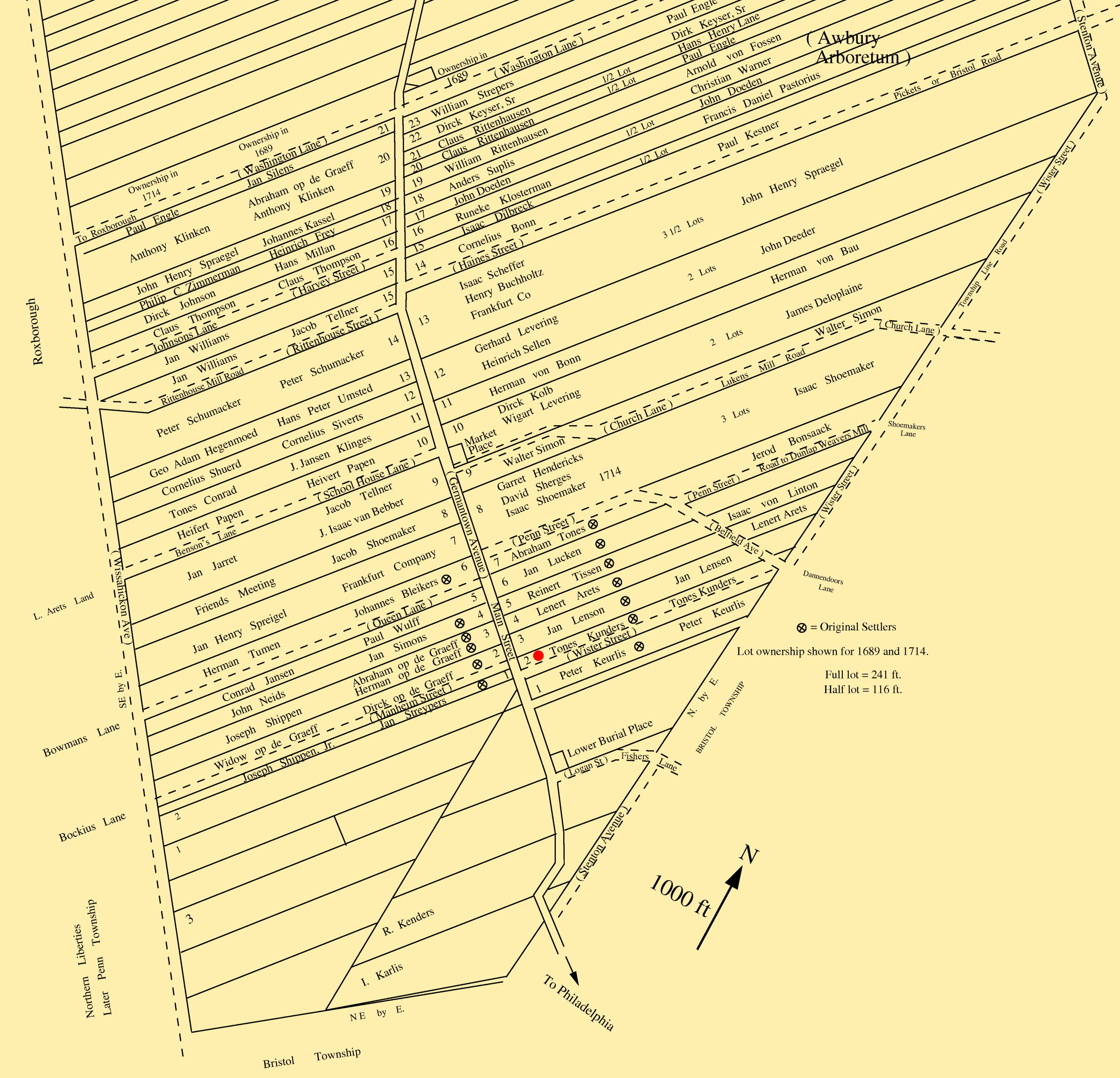
Plan of lots in Germantown, Pennsylvania, in 1689, showing lot owners in 1689 and 1714. Abraham op den Graeff owned the lots 3 and 20

==== Political and social activity ====
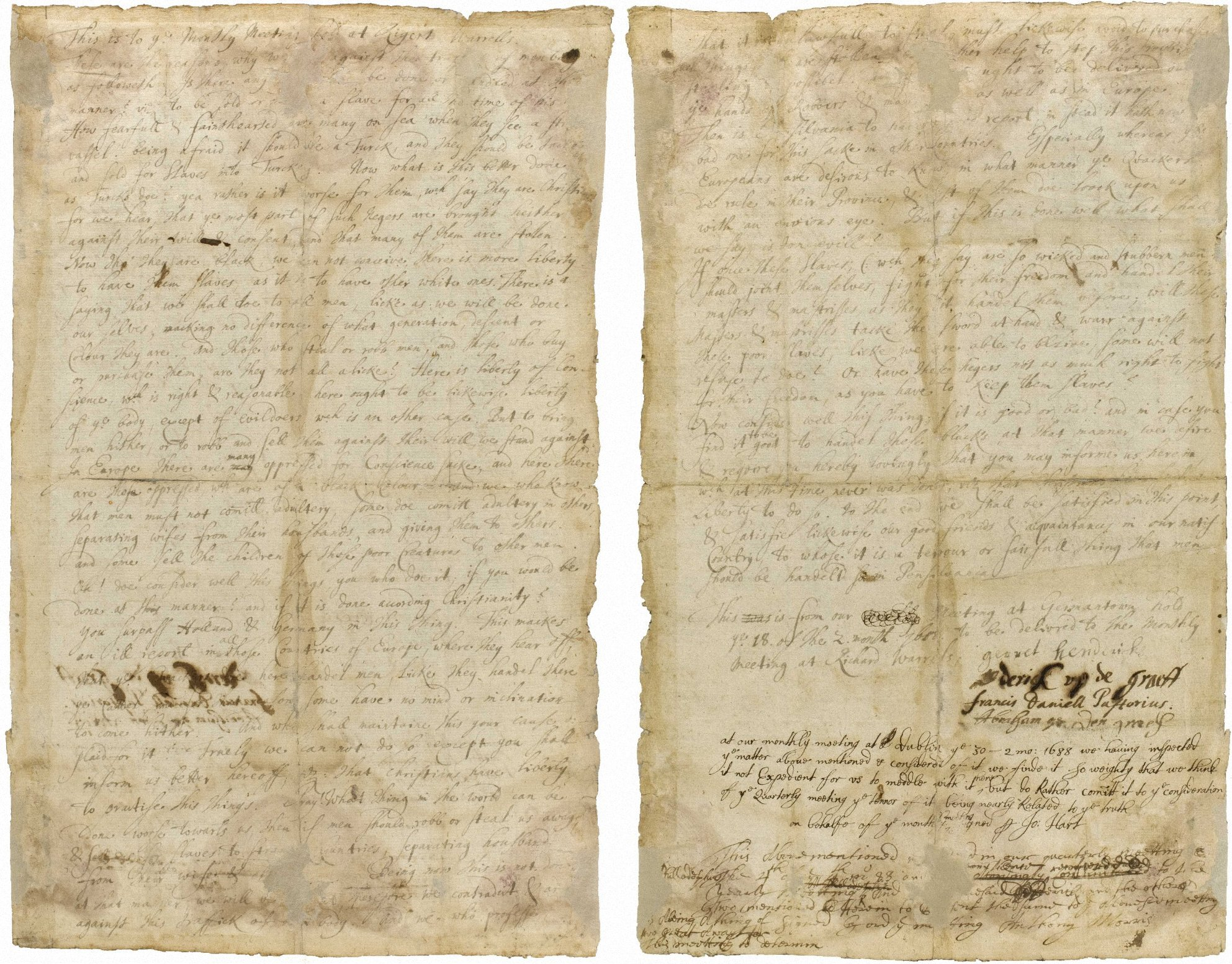
The 1688 petition was the first American public document to protest slavery. It was also one of the first written public declarations of universal human rights.

From among the Krefeld settlers, it was probably the Quakers who provided the impetus for the rejection of slavery. The 13 families from Krefeld had heard about the slave trade in the American colonies for the first time in Rotterdam on their trip to Pennsylvania. They could not imagine that they could own slaves in the land of brotherly love. However, the reality was different: Puritans and Quakers, who otherwise advocated for universal human rights, had no problems with human trafficking and did not believe it was wrong. In 1688, five years after their arrive, Abraham along with his brother Derick, Francis Daniel Pastorius and Gerrit Hendricksz signed the first organized religious petition against slavery in the colonies, the 1688 Germantown Quaker Petition Against Slavery. He signed with Abraham op Den graef. The protest was signed in the house of Thones Kunders, one of the first burgesses of Germantown. It is reasonably certain that Derick presented it at the quarterly meeting to Richard Worrall and he is the only name mentioned in connection with the presentation at the annual meeting.

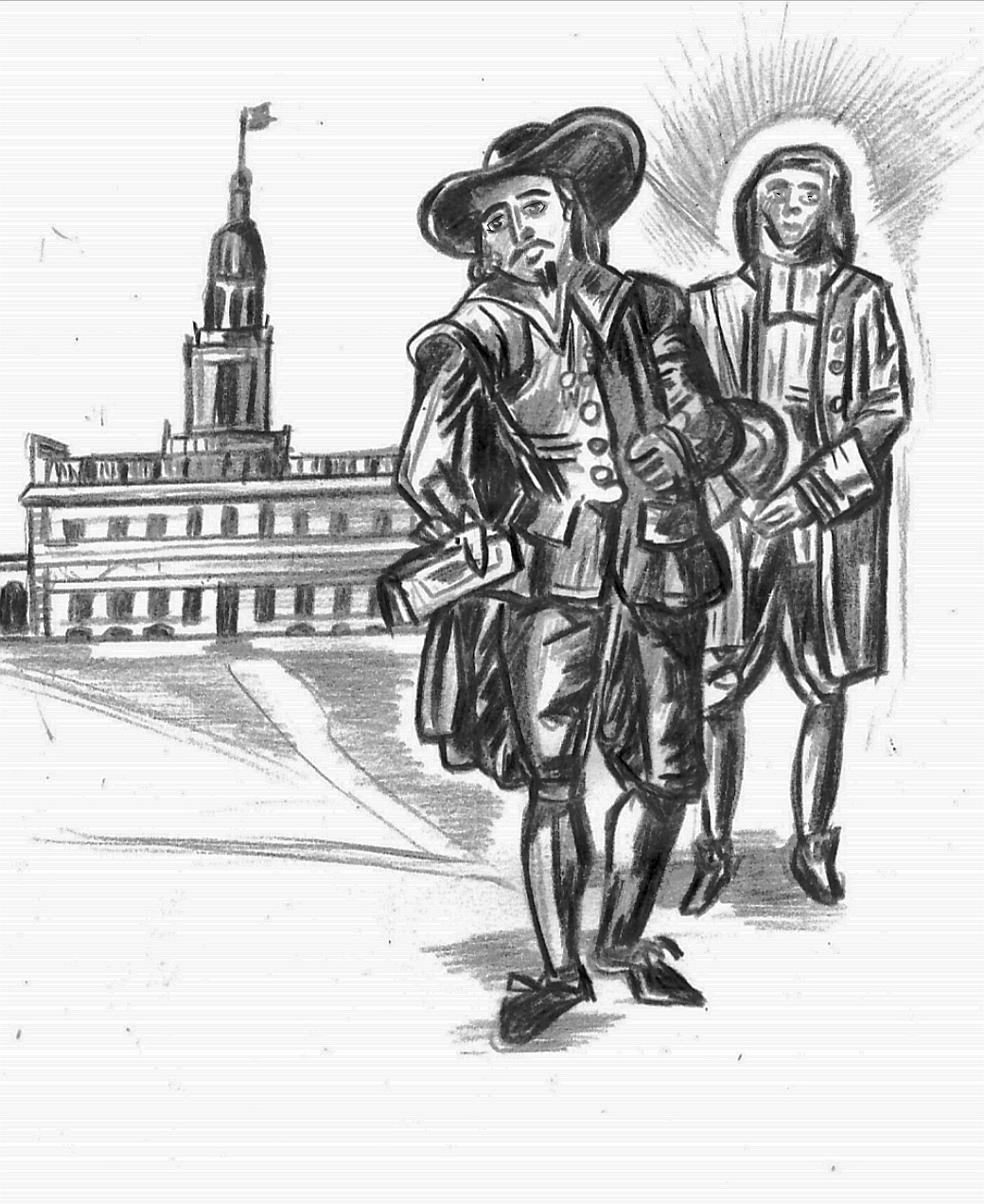
Abraham op den Graeff (left) and Francis Daniel Pastorius, elected to the Pennsylvania Provincial Assembly.

In 1689 Abraham op den Graeff was one of eleven men to whom William Penn granted a charter for the Germantown settlement. In that charter he was one of the six men appointed to serve as the first committeemen. In the same year he was elected to the Pennsylvania Provincial Assembly, representing the settlement again in 1690 and 1692. He shared his function with Pastorius, who held the same position in 1687, the honor of being the only Germantown settlers who became legislators. He would also serve as a burgess of Germantown in 1692. In 1691, Thomas Lloyd, Deputy General of Pennsylvania had granted a naturalisation to sixtytwo of the first Germantown settlers as citizens of Pennsylvania (and therefore of England) with the status of a freeman including the three Op den Graeff brothers and also other important members of the settlement, Pastorius and William Rittenhouse.

===== Keith controversity =====
Around 1691, the Quaker George Keith concluded that the Quakers had strayed too far from orthodox Christianity. This led to sharp differences of opinion with his fellow believers. Also the Krefeld Quakers were already involved in the controversy. Their advocates were the brothers Abraham and Herman op den Graeff. Their opponent was their brother Derick op den Graeff who sided the conservative Quakers, who was also a co-signer of the judgment against Keith, which excluded him from the Quaker community. He was fined five pounds by a secular court. Soon William Bradford printed in response to the testimony against Keith: "An appeal from the twenty-eight judges to the spirit of truth and true judgment in all the faithful friends, so-called Quakers, meeting at this annual meeting at Burlington, 7 months, 1692", signed by Keith, George Hutcheson, Thomas Budd, John Hart, Richard Dungwoody and Abraham op den Graeff. No other German family was as deeply involved in the conflict as the Op den Graeffs.

==== Last years ====
After that Abraham op den Graeff was the only one in his family to return to the Mennonite faith. The following years were marked by difficulties with civil government. It is likely that he did not renew his association with the Quakers after the Keith affair. That also happened through his sons Isaac and Jacob, whom he had sent to school with Pastorius in their youth, which he did not renew afterwards. In 1704 he and his wife sold their brick house and 828 acres of land in Germantown about and moved to the neighboring Perkiomen area where he laid out the remaining 1200 acres on the Perkiomen Creek and died there. He is also not buried in Germantown, but his remains lie with those of the In de Hoffens (De Haven) in the Mennonite cemetery at Skippack near Evansburg.

== Outlook ==
It cannot be said with certainty whether of the three brothers only Abraham op den Graeff had descendants. In the book History of the Op Den Graef/Updegraff Family by June Shaull Lutz it is reported that Herman op den Graeff also had children. Other sources such as Prof. William I. Hull in his work William Penn and the Dutch Quaker Migration to Pennsylvania do not name any children. However, it is mainly reported that Abraham op den Graeff is the ancestor of all Op den Graeffs who emegrated to America in 1683. Isaac Updegraff (1680 in Krefeld-1745 in Chester County, Province of Pennsylvania), the elder of his two sons, continued the family tradition of people deeply involved in religious affairs. This Updegraff branch of Abrahams great-great grandson Nathan Updegraff later settled in Ohio was among the leading families of the Quaker movement, and produced a long line of clergy and elders in the state.

Abraham op den Graeffs descendants used a variety of spellings of the surname, including Opdegraf(f), Updegraf (f), Uptegraft, Uptagrafft, Updegrave, Updegrove, Updegraph, Uptegrove and Upthegrove. Pennsylvania Governor Samuel Whitaker Pennypacker was the fourth great-grandson of Abraham.

== The Pennsylvania Pilgrim ==
Abraham or his brother Derick is briefly mentioned in John Greenleaf Whittier's abolitionist poem "The Pennsylvania Pilgrim", published in 1872.

"Talking of old home scenes, op den Graaff. Teased the low backlog with his shodden staff, till the red embers broke into a laugh and dance of flame, as if they fain would cheer. The rugged face, half tender, half äußere, touched with the pathos of a homesick tear!"

— John Greenleaf Whittier.
