= Derick op den Graeff =

German-American abolitionist (1646–1697)

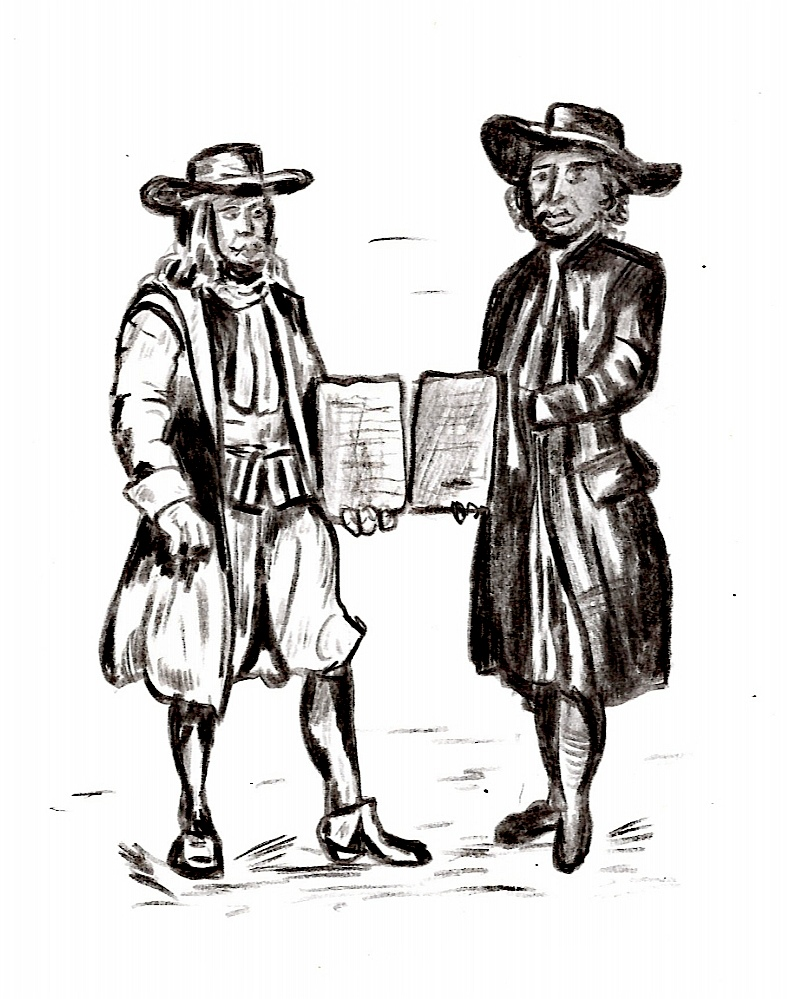
- Derick op den Graeff and Abraham op den Graeff with the petition of the first organized religious protest against slavery in colonial America; sketch by Matthias Laurenz Gräff (2023)

bailiff or chief executive (burgomaster) of Germantown
- In office 1693–1694

Personal details
- Born: 1646 Krefeld, Germany
- Died: 1697 (aged 50–51) Germantown, Philadelphia, Pennsylvania
- Profession: Politician, weaver, merchant

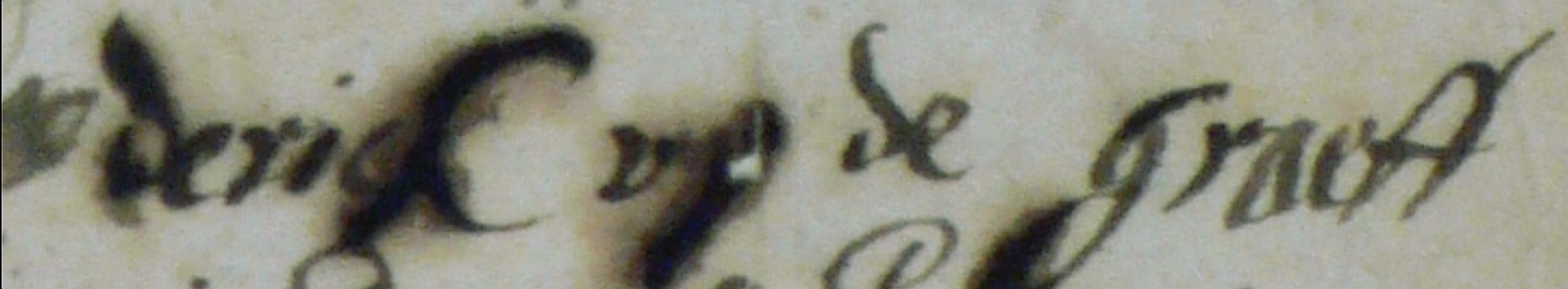
Signature of Derick op den Graeff (at the 1688 Germantown Quaker petition against slavery)

Derick Isaacs op den Graeff, also Dirk, Dirck, Derrick Isaacs op den Graeff, Opdengraef, Opdengraff as well as Op den Gräff (1646 in Krefeld – May 24, 1697 in Germantown, Philadelphia, Pennsylvania), was one of the so-called Original 13, the first closed group of German emigrants to North America, an original founder of Germantown, Pennsylvania, as well as a civic leader. As an early abolitionist He was a signer of the first organized religious protest against slavery in colonial America. He, or his brother Abraham op den Graeff, are briefly mentioned in John Greenleaf Whittier's poem "The Pennsylvania Pilgrim" simply as "Op Den Graaf".

== Biography ==
=== Early life ===
Derick op den Graeff was born to Isaac Herman op den Graeff (1616–1669) and Margaret 'Grietgen' Peters Doors (around 1620–1683). Former Mennonite leader Herman op den Graeff was his grandfather. The Op den Graeff family were originally Mennonites.

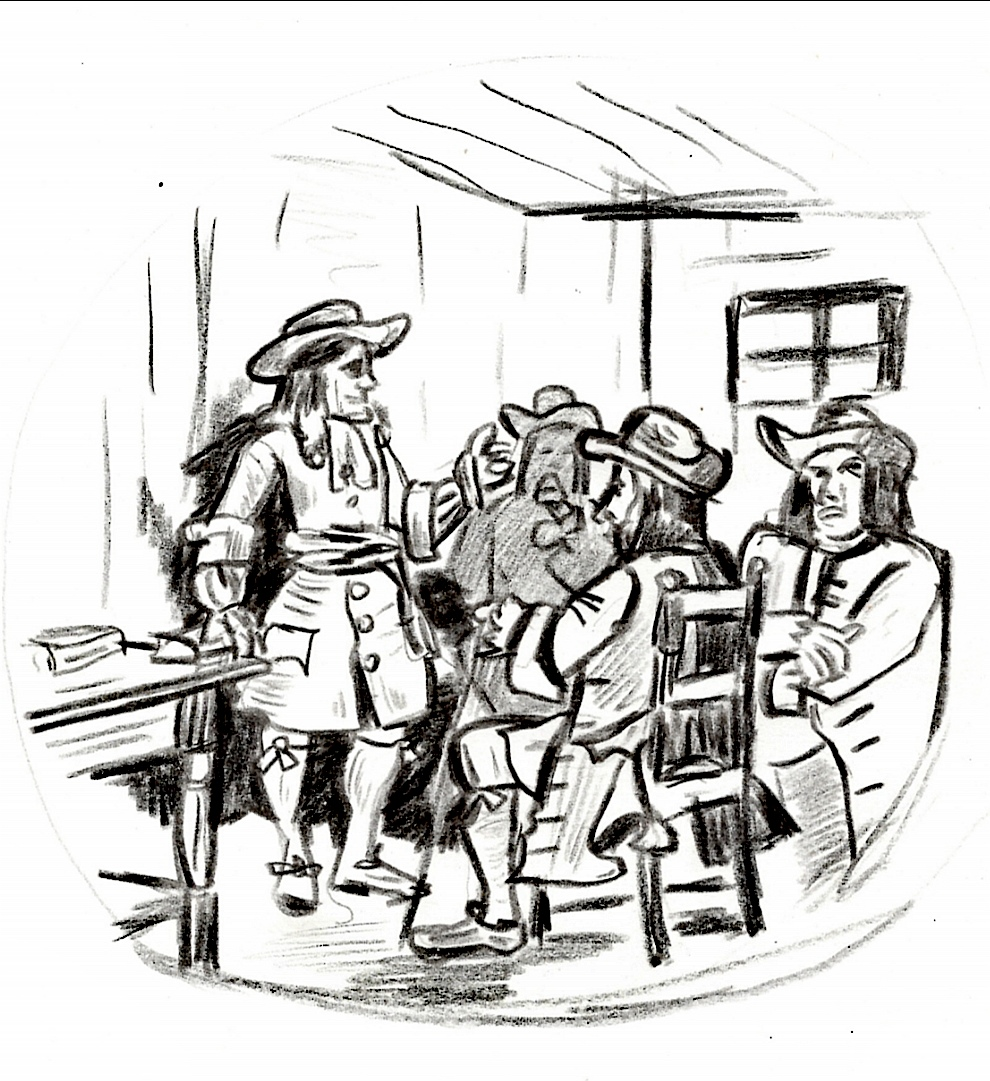
William Penn talks to the (later) founders of Germantown, Pennsylvania, Francis Daniel Pastorius, Derick and Abraham op den Graeff

Quaker missionary work in the lower and middle Rhine River valley during the 1660s resulted in the conversion of a number of Mennonites in and around Krefeld. Among these converts were Derick op den Graeff and his family. The Quakers were not as readily tolerated by the people of Krefeld. In 1679 five of them, including Derick's brother Herman op den Graeff, were forcibly exiled from Krefeld. It's possible that Derick belonged to those people. They were eventually allowed to return through pressure from the English Quakers, but by this time William Penn's Colony was being established (1681-1682). The Op den Graeffs where in fact cousins to Penn. In 1682 Derick married to Nölken Vyken from Kempen in a Quaker wedding in Krefeld. The opportunity to follow their Quaker beliefs without fear of persecution was undoubtedly a major factor in their decision to emigrate from Krefeld. Derick became the leader of the first 13 families, the so-called Original 13, leave, including his brothers Herman and Abraham and their families, arriving at Philadelphia, Province of Pennsylvania on the Concord in October 1683. The three Op den Graeffs had another brother, Adolphus Op Den Graeff (* 1648), who did not join the emigration but settled near Koblenz before 1680. His grandson John William (Johan Wilhelm) op den Graeff (1732 - between 1800 and 1804) immigrated in 1753 to Pennsylvania as well. Their descendants joined their name into Updegrove.

=== Germantown Settlement ===
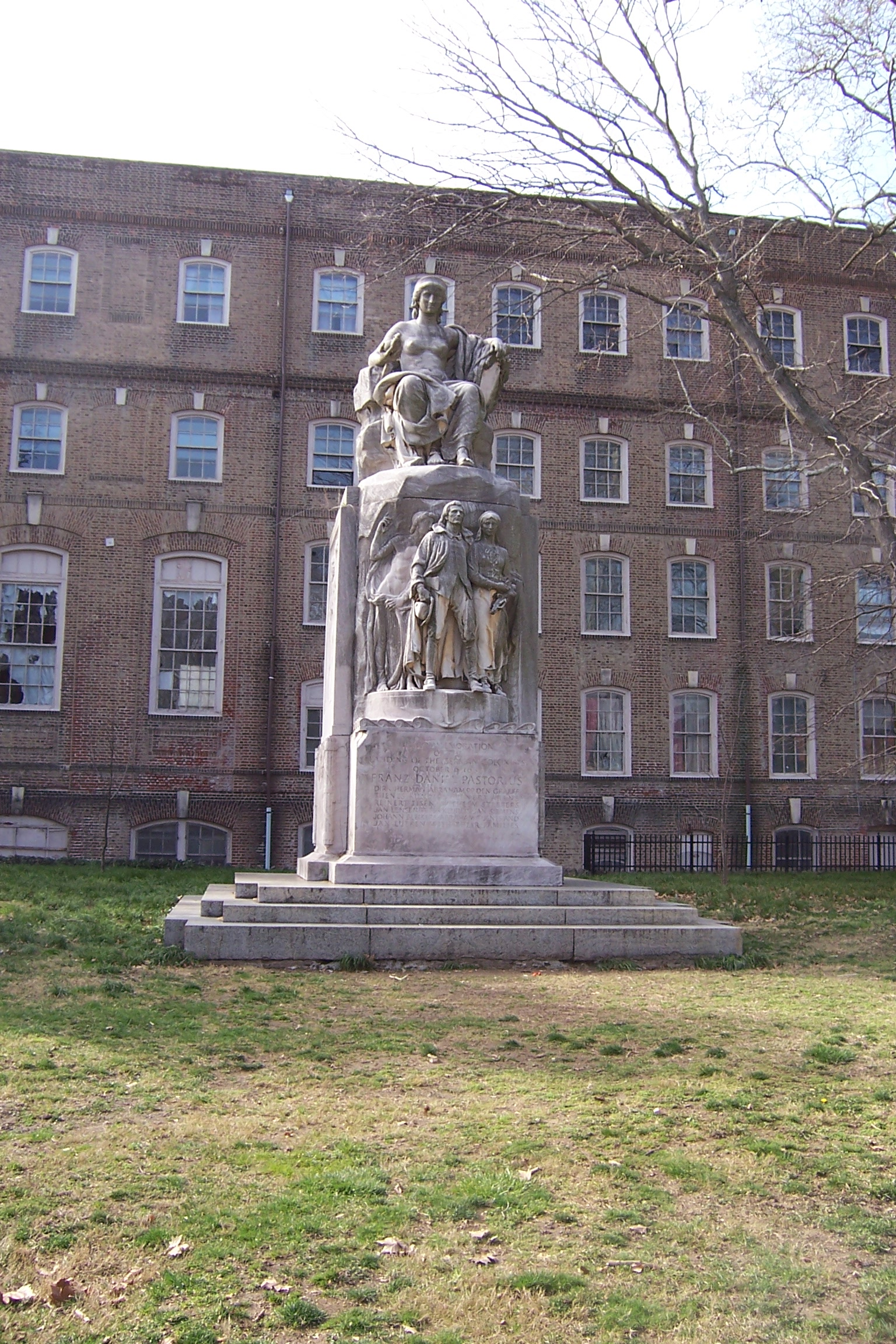
Monument in Vernon Park, Philadelphia, in memory of Francis Daniel Pastorius and the first settlers.

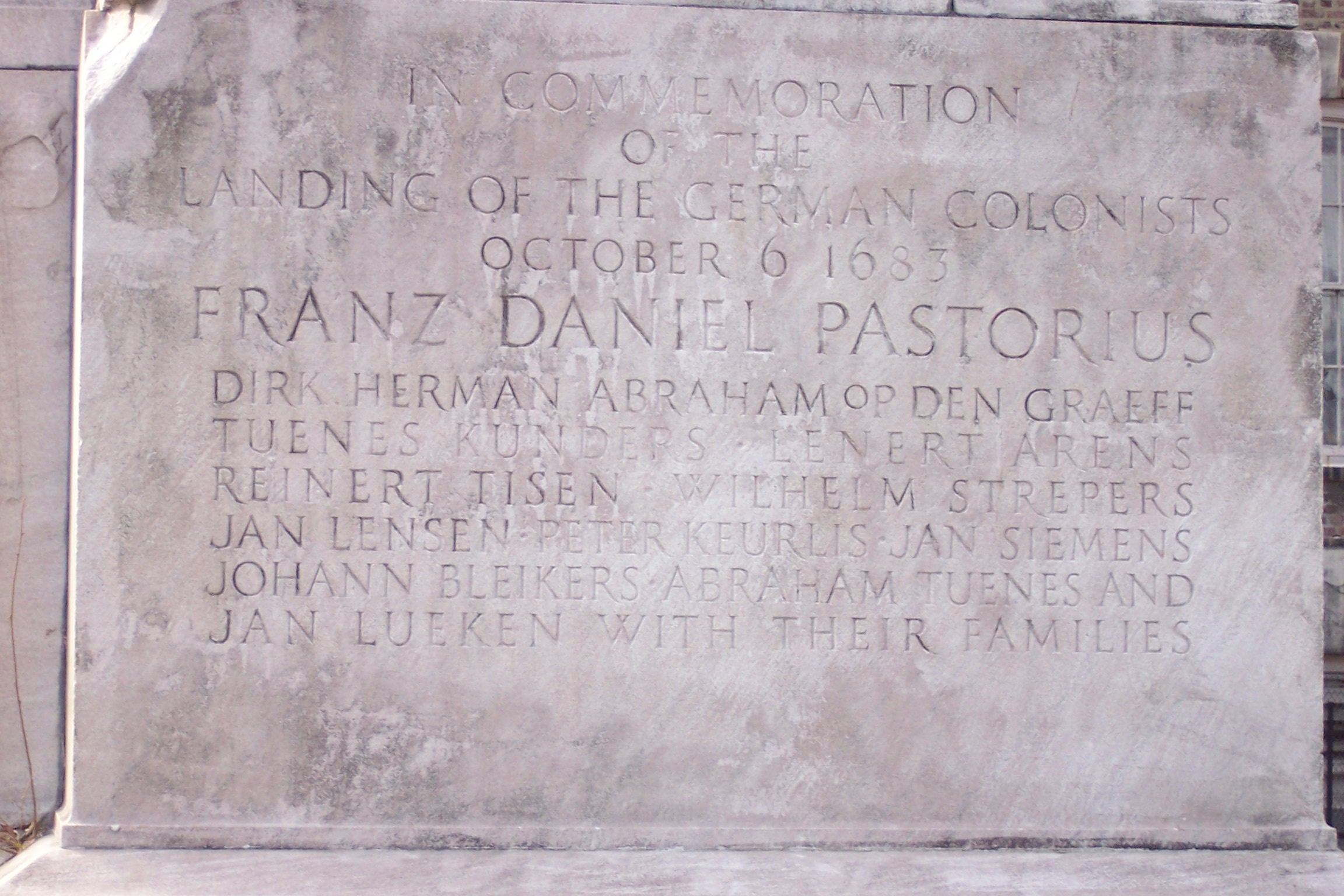
Inscription plaque with the names of the Op den Graeff brothers

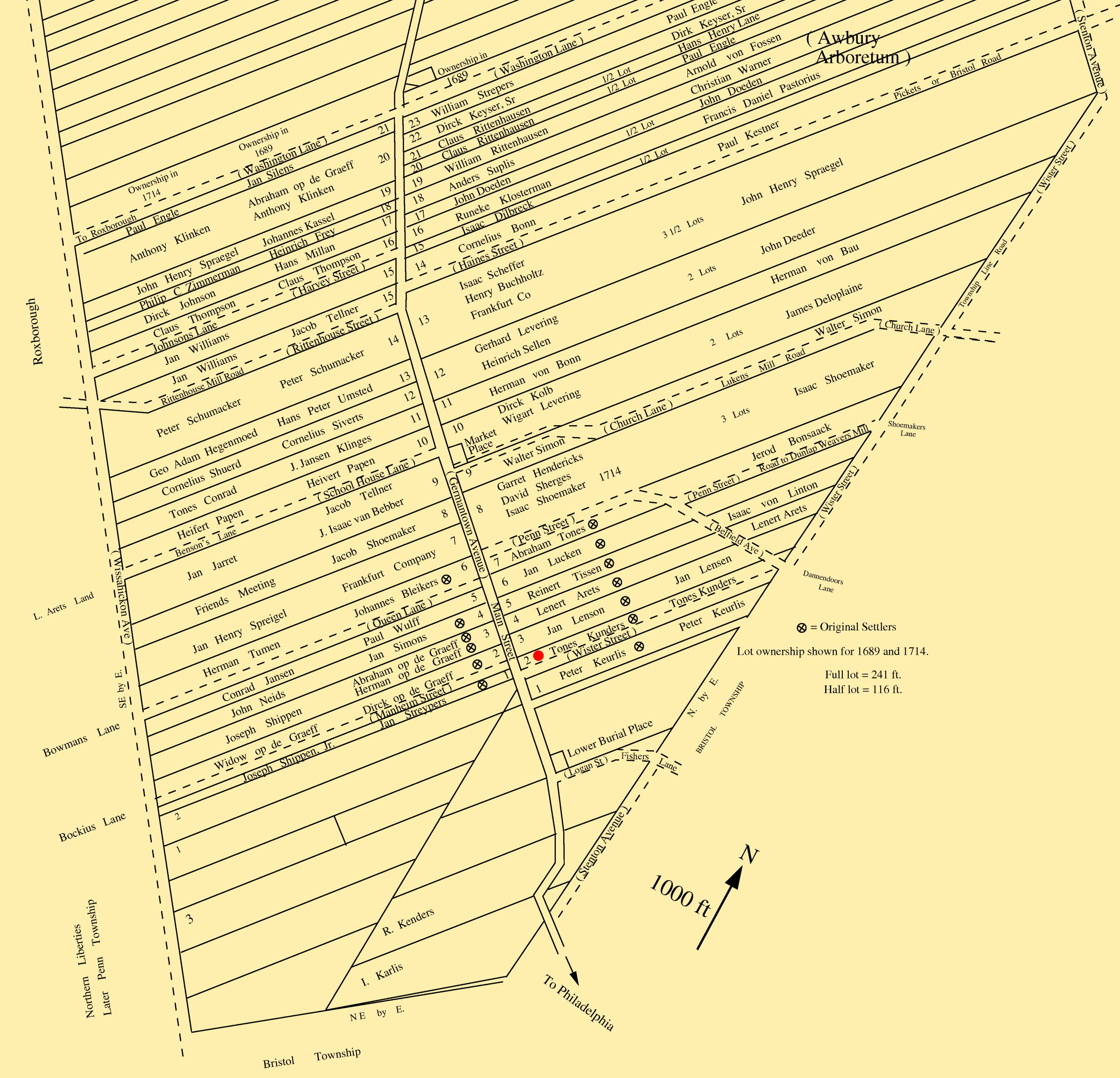
Plan of lots in Germantown, Pennsylvania, in 1689, showing lot owners in 1689 and 1714. Derick op den Graeff owned the lot 2.

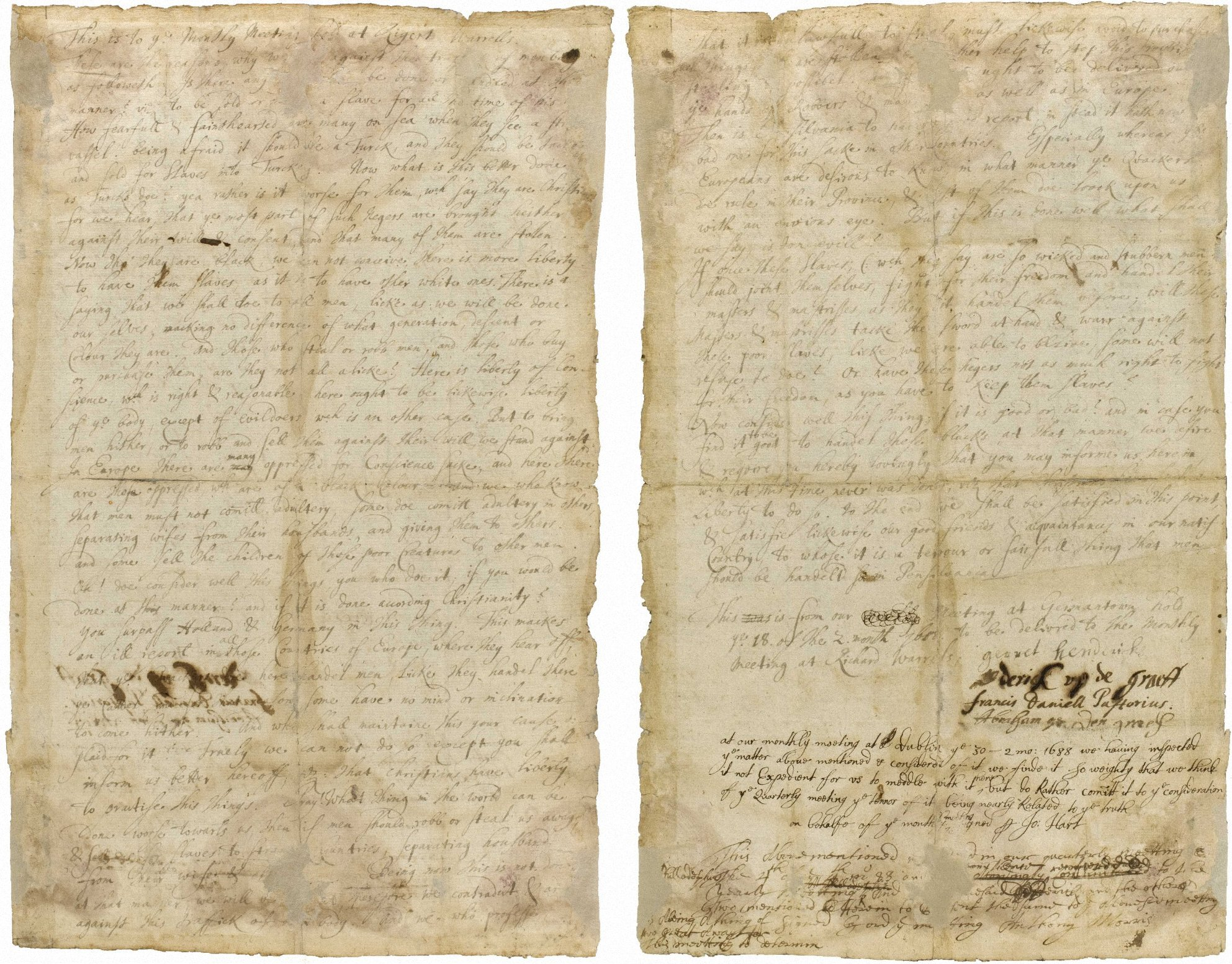
The petition was the first American public document to protest slavery. It was also one of the first written public declarations of universal human rights.

Derick op den Graeff and his family were one of the original thirteen families which founded Germantown. He continued his trade as linen weaver and remained prominent in Germantown civic and religious life.

From among the Krefeld settlers, it was probably the Quakers who provided the impetus for the rejection of slavery. The 13 families from Krefeld had heard about the slave trade in the American colonies for the first time in Rotterdam on their trip to Pennsylvania. They could not imagine that they could own slaves in the land of brotherly love. However, the reality was different: Puritans and Quakers, who otherwise advocated for universal human rights, had no problems with human trafficking and did not believe it was wrong. In 1688, five years after their arrival, Derick along with his brother Abraham, Francis Daniel Pastorius and Gerrit Hendricksz signed the first organized religious petition against slavery in the colonies, the 1688 Germantown Quaker Petition Against Slavery in the house of Thones Kunders. He signed the petition with derick op de graeff. It is reasonably certain that Derick presented it at the quarterly meeting to Richard Worrall and he is the only name mentioned in connection with the presentation at the annual meeting.

Like his brother Herman, Derick op den Graeff was a member of the Germantown Quaker meeting. He was a burgess and in 1689 he was appointer as one of the eleven charter members of the Germantown corporation by William Penn, and together with three others to the first burgesses. In 1691, Thomas Lloyd, Deputy General of Pennsylvania had granted a naturalisation to sixtytwo of the first Germantown settlers as citizens of Pennsylvania (and therefore of England) with the status of a freeman including the three Op den Graeff brothers and also other important members of the settlement, Pastorius and William Rittenhouse.

Around 1691, the Quaker George Keith concluded that the Quakers had strayed too far from orthodox Christianity. This led to sharp differences of opinion with his fellow believers. Also the Krefeld Quakers were already involved in the controversy. The Krefeld Quaker advocates were the brothers Abraham and Herman op den Graeff who sided Keith. Their opponent was their brother Derick op den Graeff who sided the conservative Quakers and also co-signed the judgment against Keith, which excluded him from the Quaker community. He was fined five pounds by a secular court. Herman on the other hand was one of a group of 69 men who wrote a letter defending Keith. No other German family was as deeply involved in the conflict as the Op den Graeffs.

In 1692 Derick op den Graeff was one of the town's six "committeemen", and in 1693-1694 he was the bailiff or chief executive (burgomaster). He was a member of the Germantown Quaker meeting. He died without progeny in 1697.

=== Coat of arms ===
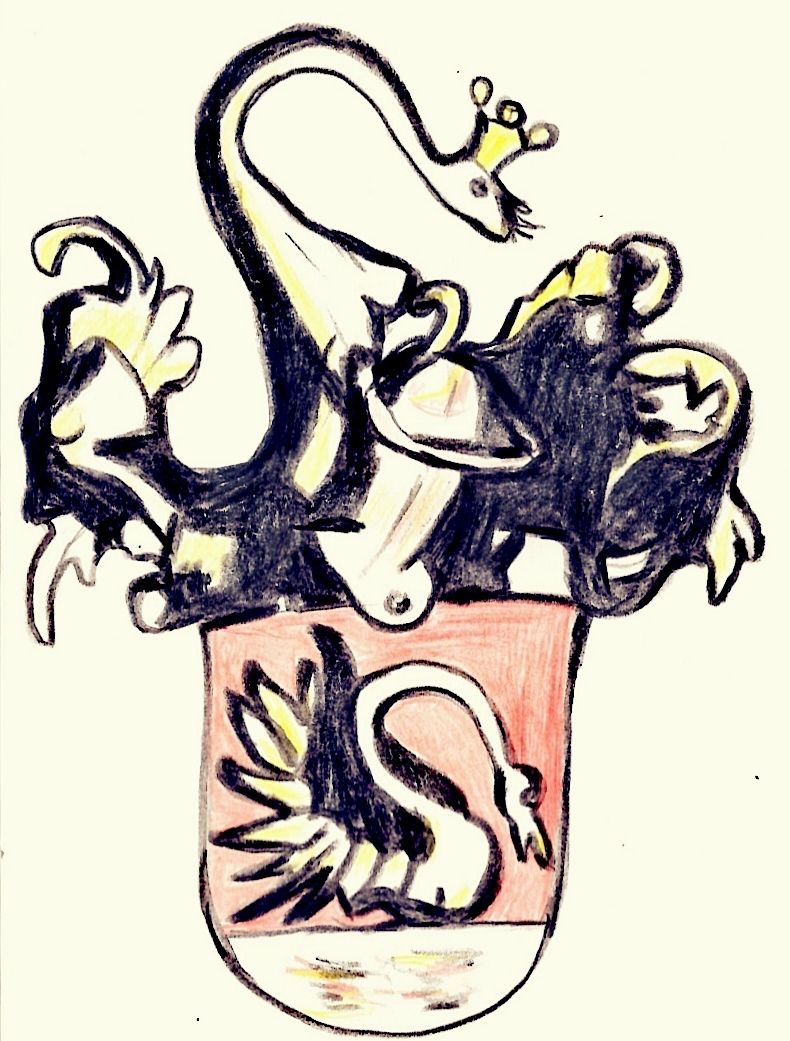
Possible, but not proven coat of arms Op den Graeff as descendants of Herman op den Graeff (Heraldic representation by Matthias Laurenz Gräff based on the Krefeld Op den Graeff stained glass window from 1630, which may depict the "Lohengrin swan" of the Kleve coat of arms in one window)

There is a reference about the Op den Graeff glass paintings of Krefeld with a description of Herman op den Graeff's coat of arms was found in the estate of W. Niepoth (op den Graeff folder) in the archives of the city of Krefeld, who noted a letter dated November 17, 1935 from Richard Wolfferts to Dr Risler: Saw the Coat of Arms glass pane in the old museum: 'Herman op den Graeff und Grietgen syn housfrau' or the like. Coat of Arms - In the sign a silver swan in blue. Helmet decoration (I think): Swan growing.

== The Pennsylvania Pilgrim ==
Derick or his brother Abraham is briefly mentioned in John Greenleaf Whittier's abolitionist poem "The Pennsylvania Pilgrim", published in 1872.

"Talking of old home scenes, op den Graaff. Teased the low backlog with his shodden staff, till the red embers broke into a laugh and dance of flame, as if they fain would cheer. The rugged face, half tender, half äußere, touched with the pathos of a homesick tear!"

— John Greenleaf Whittier.
