= Stephen Updegraff =

- Education: Eckerd College; Penn State College of Medicine
- Known for: LASIK
- Medical career
- Field: ophthalmic surgery

Stephen Updegraff, M.D., FACS (born January 31, 1962, in St. Petersburg, Florida) is an American refractive surgeon best known for his early involvement in, and contributions to, LASIK. He is a Fellow of the American College of Surgeons, a board-certified member of the American Board of Ophthalmology, a founding member of the American College of Ophthalmic Surgeons, and a member of the International Society of Refractive Surgery, the American Academy of Ophthalmology, the American Society of Cataract and Refractive Surgery, and the Pine Ridge Eye Study Society. Updegraff currently serves as the medical director of Updegraff Vision in St. Petersburg, Florida.

== Early life ==
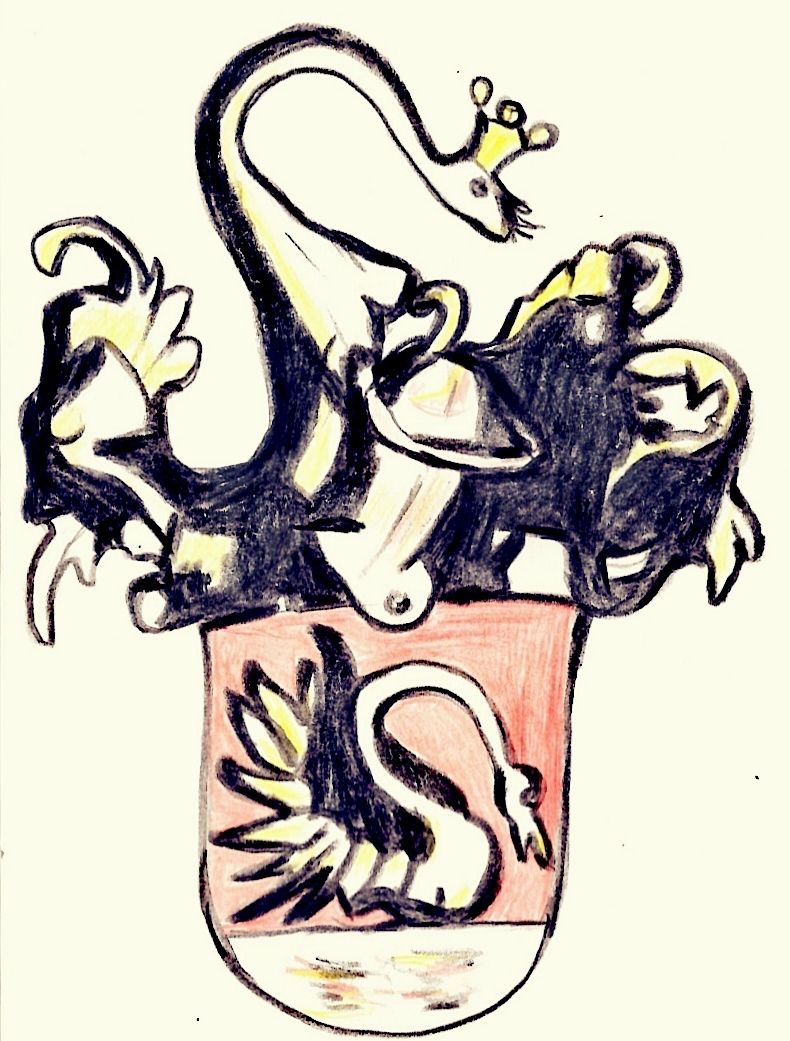
Possible, but not proven coat of arms Op den Graeff as descendants of Herman op den Graeff (Heraldic representation by Matthias Laurenz Gräff based on the Krefeld Op den Graeff stained glass window from 1630, which may depict the “Lohengrin swan” of the Kleve coat of arms in one window)

Updegraff was born in St. Petersburg, Florida. Updegraff was a descendant of the Dutch and German Op den Graeff family. He was a direct descendant of Herman op den Graeff, mennonite leader of Krefeld, and his grandson Abraham op den Graeff, one of the founders of Germantown and in 1688 signer of the first protest against slavery in colonial America.

Stephen Updegraff graduated from The McCallie School in Chattanooga, Tennessee. He was exposed to the medical treatment of eyes at an early age by his father, ophthalmologist Ambrose Updegraff, M.D., whom he accompanied on hospital rounds to visit patients who had undergone eye surgeries.

== Education ==
Updegraff received his bachelor's degree in biology from Eckerd College in 1984, and his M.D. from the Penn State College of Medicine in 1989.

== Career ==
Updegraff completed a six-month internship and his ophthalmic residency at the Louisiana State University Eye Center in New Orleans, where he performed research on excimer lasers, focusing specifically on procedures such as keratomileusis. During a fellowship at the University of Texas-Houston's Hermann Eye Center, Updegraff worked for Stephen G. Slade, M.D., then one of only two surgeons in the United States performing keratomileusis, and was a member of the team chaired by Slade and Luis A. Ruiz, M.D., that developed LASIK.

During its 1994 FDA clinical trials, Updegraff performed the third LASIK surgery in the United States. He then became the first surgeon to perform LASIK in Asia, where he demonstrated it and taught its techniques to hundreds of doctors in China. Updegraff currently has seven patents on technologies for LASIK and microsurgery of the eye, and he frequently lectures and publishes on issues and advancements in refractive surgery.

== Patents ==
- Apparatus and method for mechanically dilating the pupil of an eye (1994)
- Method of radial keratotomy employing a vibrating cutting blade (1995)
- Corneal surface marker and marking method for reducing irregular astigmatism during lamellar (LASIK) corneal surgery (1997)
- Corneal surface marker and marking method for improving laser centration (1998)
- Corneal irrigation cannula and method of using (1998)
- Corneal flap/cap elevator (1998)
- Corneal irrigation cannula (1998)

== Awards and achievements ==
1995-97 Advisory Panel, Ethicon Surgery
1996-00 Skills Transfer Advisory Board Member, American Academy of Ophthalmology
1997-00 USA Representative, International Society of Refractive Surgery Global Council
1998-00 VISX Star Surgeon, Top 50 Excimer Laser Surgeons, United States
1999 Outstanding Career Achievement Award, Eckerd College
2000 Best Presentation, International Society of Refractive Surgery
2001 Achievement Award, American Academy of Ophthalmology
2003 Outstanding Business of the Year Award, St. Petersburg Area Chamber of Commerce
2003 Performed first Crystalens lens implant surgery in Florida
2003-05 Board of Trustees Member, Prevent Blindness
2007 Kritzinger Memorial Award, International Society of Refractive Surgery & South African Society of Cataract and Refractive Surgery
2008 Center of Excellence Award, Crystalens
2009 Best Paper of Session, American Society of Cataract and Refractive Surgery
2009-11 Dean's Council on Science member, Eckerd College
2009 Distinguished Citizen Award, West Central Florida Council Boy Scouts of America
2010-12 Best Doctors in America list
2010-11 Leading Innovators in Premium IOL implant surgery list, Premier Surgeon
2011 Top Doctors list, U.S. News & World Report
