= Op den Graeff family =

German American Mennonite family of Dutch origin

Op den Graeff
- Priestly family, political family
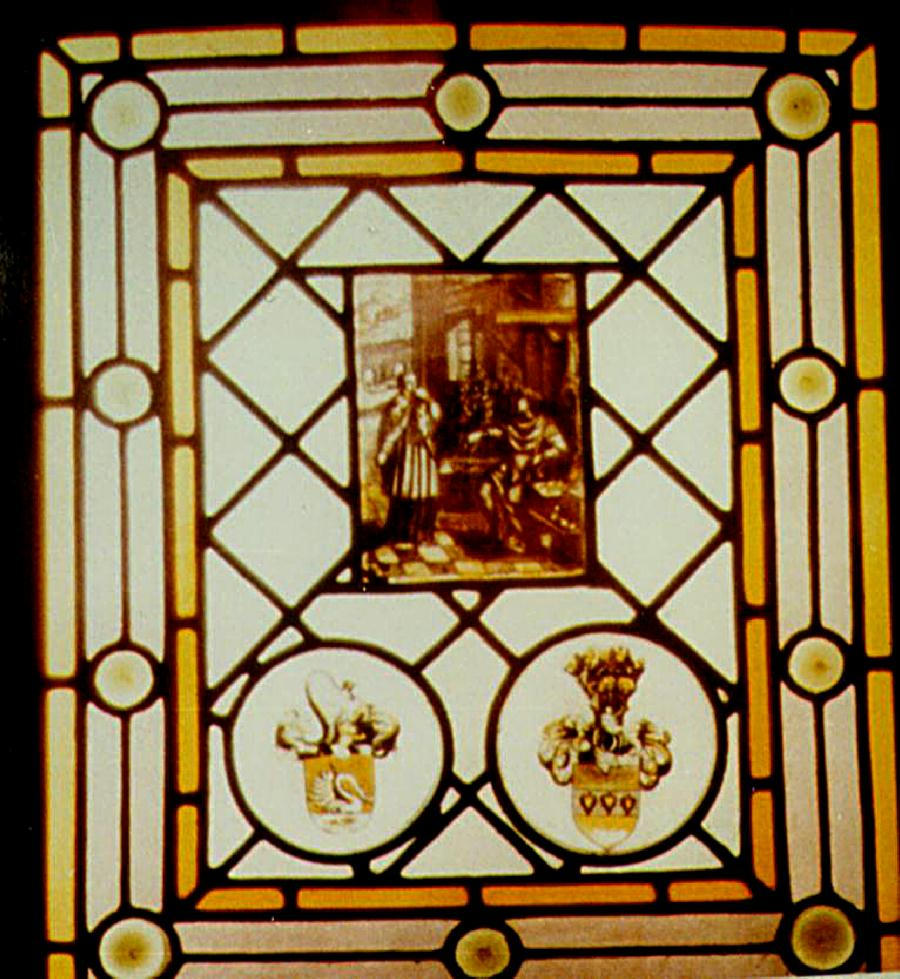
- Part of the Op den Graeff stained window of Krefeld, showing their coat of arms (left with the swan)
- Current region: Pennsylvania and Ohio, among others
- Etymology: Dutch-German for "of the count"
- Origin: German American Community, Dutch American Community
- Connected families: Von der Leyen family Penn family Lupton family Schumacher/Shoemaker family In den Hofen/De Haven family Van Bebber Kerlin/Keurlis Dohrs

Op den Graeff (Dutch pronunciation: [ɔb də(ŋ) ˈɣraːf]) is a German and American family of Dutch origin. They were one of the first families of the Mennonite faith in Krefeld at the beginning of the 17th century. Various family members belonged to Original 13, the first organized immigration of a closed group of Germans to America in 1683. There the family had a long history in religious service and politics, beginning in the late 17th century in the Colony of Pennsylvania. In 1688, they became forerunners of the anti-slavery movement by signing the first anti-slavery protest in North America. Their descendants spread into various lines, Updegraff, Uptegraft, Uptagrafft. Updegraft, Updegrave, Updegrove, Uptegrove, Ubdegrove, Uptegraph, Upthagrove. The Updegraff branch of Ohio belonged to the leading families of the Quaker religious movement and produced a long line of ministers and elders.

== History ==
=== Origin ===
The earliest historically proven Op den Graeff, Herman op den Graeff (1585–1642), lived in Aldekerk (Kleve), near the border to the modern Netherlands. Some believe that Duke John William, Duke of Jülich-Cleves-Berg had a morganatic marriage prior to 1585 with Anna op den Graeff (van de Aldekerk), with whom he had Herman. No substantial evidence of any relation between Op den Graeff and the Duke has ever been presented. According to another family tradition, the Op den Graeff, like the Dutch De Graeff family, descended from the Von Graben through Wolfgang von Graben, who were mentioned in Holland between 1476 and 1483. Graeff was the Dutch spelling of Graben during the 14th and 15th century. These sources are not documented and cannot be verified. Another source reports that the Op den Graeff family may have come from Flanders.

=== Krefeld ===
The Op den Graeffs were originally Mennonites, and are believed to have come from nearby Aldekerk in the Catholic Duchy of Julich about 1605 to avoid persecution. At that time Krefeld was an exclave of the County of Moers, and under the authority of the Prince of Orange, stadtholder of the Republic of the United Netherlands. In contrast to the leaders of Julich and the nearby Electorate of Cologne, the stadtholders of the Netherlands were tolerant of non-conforming religions. As a result, Krefeld had become a point of refuge for the persecuted Mennonites during the 17th century. The Op den Graeffs, under the guidance of Herman op den Graeff, like many of the Krefeld Mennonites, were linen weavers, other relatives practiced in different cloth making trades such as dying. Some of these families continued this occupation later in Germantown, Pennsylvania. The Op den Graeffs had an influence on the circle of Mennonites, which turned Quaker in part around 1679–1680. In 1683 the three Op den Graeff brothers Derick, Herman and Abraham, grandchildren of Herman, with their families migrated to the United States. They are among the thirteen families, the Original 13, the first closed group of German emigrants to North America, often referred to as the Germantown, Philadelphia, Pennsylvania Founders, who arrived on the ship Concord on October 6. The three Op den Graeffs had another brother, Adolphus Op Den Graeff (* 1648), who did not join the emigration but settled near Koblenz before 1680. His grandson John William (Johan Wilhelm) op den Graeff (1732 - between 1800 and 1804) immigrated in 1753 to Pennsylvania as well. Their descendants joined their name into Updegrove.

=== America ===
In Germantown, two of the Op den Graeff brothers, Derick and Abraham, signed along Francis Daniel Pastorius and Gerrit Hendricksz the first organized religious petition against slavery in the colonies, the 1688 Germantown Quaker Petition Against Slavery. Abraham op den Graeff was the only one of the three brothers who had descendants. Some of them continued in or returned to the Mennonite faith and were found in the Montgomery County congregations of Skippack and Boyertown until modern times. Then the family split up into a lot of different spelled names and family branches, Opdegraf(f), Updegraf(f), Uptagraff(t), Updegrave, Updegrove, Updegraph, Uptegraph, Upthegrove, Upthagrove and Ubdegrove. Pennsylvania Governor Samuel Whitaker Pennypacker was the fourth great-grandson of Abraham, while US-president Theodore Roosevelt was the sixth great-grandson of "bishop" Herman op den Graeff.

In 1802 Nathan Updegraff, a great-great-grandson of Abraham, settled north in Mount Pleasant, Jefferson, Ohio. This branch belonged to the 19th-century Quaker families of that state and produced a lot of Quaker Ministers and elders. The son of Nathan, David Benjamin Updegraff (1789–1864) of that family was a conductor and one of the leaders of the Underground Railroad. He was one of the first outspoken anti-slavery men, and voted with the first liberty party from conscientious convictions. His house was the home of antislavery advocates and temperance lecturers also a station on the Underground Railroad.

==== Original Thirteen ====
The Original 13 were the families of Leonard Arets van Aaken, Abraham Isacks op den Graeff, Derick op den Graeff, Herman Isacks op den Graeff, Wilhelm Strepers, Tönes Coenen-Heggers, Reiner Theissen, Johann Simons, Johann Lenssen, Peter Kürlis, Johannes Bleickers, Johann Lucken, and Abraham Tunes Klinken.

The families, approximately 33 individuals from Krefeld who settled Germantown in Philadelphia in 1683 after facing exile in Europe, established the settlement as a center of religious freedom, cultural integration, and academic pursuit on 15,000 acres purchased by the Frankfurt Land Company. It would grow into a sophisticated urban village. It laid the foundation for further German immigration to the American colonies, promoted by Pastorius's 1700 publication Umständige Geographische Beschreibung der Pennsylvania. The promotion of tolerance led to Dutch and English settlers joining the community as well.

Wilhelm Rittenhausen was a notable immigrant to the community, establishing the colonies' first paper mill and serving as the colonies' first Mennonite bishop. Herman Isacks op den Graeff was the original President of First Council in Germantown, in which he earlier published one of the first "Bill of Rights" in the colonies known as the Pamphlet of Protest 1680. The op den Graeff's original settlement in Germantown constituted 828 acres. The families were intermarried, with Peter Kürlis's wife Eliabeth Dohrs descending from the op den Graeffs. An example of cultural integration saw Kürlis's son Peter wed Mary Cloud, of English heritage.

== Coat of arms ==
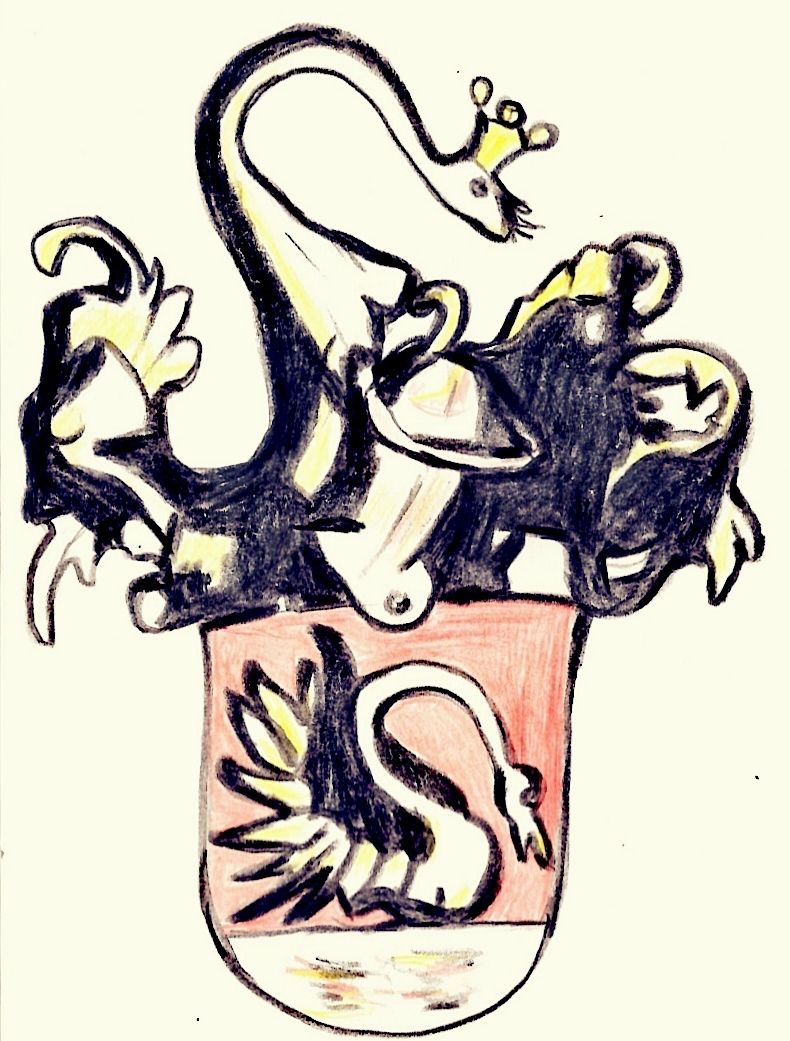
Possible, but not proven, coat of arms Op den Graeff as descendants of Herman op den Graeff. Heraldic representation by Matthias Laurenz Gräff based on a stained glass window in Krefeld, 1630, which may depict the “Lohengrin swan” of the Kleve coat of arms in one window.

There is a reference about the Op den Graeff glass paintings of Krefeld, with a description of Herman's possible, but not proven, coat of arms, found in the estate of W. Niepoth (op den Graeff folder) in the archives of the city of Krefeld, who noted a letter dated November 17, 1935, from Richard Wolfferts to Dr Risler: "Saw the Coat of Arms glass pane in the old museum: 'Herman op den Graeff und Grietgen syn housfrau' or the like. Coat of Arms - In the sign a silver swan in blue. Helmet decoration (I think): Swan growing."

== Notable family members ==
Main Op den Graeff / Updegraff line family members from Krefeld and Pennsylvania:

1. Herman op den Graeff (1585–1642), Mennonite community leader of Krefeld, delegate and signer of the sign the Dordrecht Confession of Faith
  1. Isaac Herman op den Graeff (1616–1679), joined the Quakers
    1. Herman Isacks op den Graeff (1642–1708), one of the "Original 13", the first closed group of German immigrants to North America, original founder of Germantown, Pennsylvania
    2. Derick op den Graeff (1646–1697), leader of the "Original 13", politician, signer of the first organized religious protest against slavery, original founder of Germantown, Pennsylvania
    3. Abraham op den Graeff (1649–1731), one of the "Original 13", politician, signer of the first organized religious protest against slavery, original founder of Germantown, Pennsylvania
      1. Isaac op den Graeff (1678–1745), linen weaver at Germantown
        1. Derrick op den Graeff (1696–1738)
          1. Joseph Updegraff (1726–1801), commissioner of York County, Pennsylvania
            1. Nathan Updegraff (1750–1827), a founder and delegate to Ohio's first constitutional convention
              1. David Benjamin Updegraff (1789–1864), conductor of the Underground Railroad, minister of Friends church
                1. Jonathan T. Updegraff (1822–1882), U.S. Representative from Ohio
                2. David Brainard Updegraff (1830–1894), minister of Friends church (Quaker minister)
                  1. William Ross Updegraff (1859–1940)
                    1. Allan Eugene Updegraff (1883–1965), American-born novelist, poet, and editor; died at Paris, France
        2. Herman Updegraff (1711–1758), Cordwainer, shoemaker, justice of the peace and of the Common Pleas Court for York County
          1. Abraham Updegraff (1746–1781)
            1. Thomas Updegraff (1774–1857), businessman and agent for the Underground Railroad
              1. William Updegraff (1798–1846)
                1. Thomas Updegraff (1834–1910), attorney and five-term Republican member of the U.S. House of Representatives from northeastern Iowa
- Joseph S. Updegraff, member of the Ohio Senate

Other Updegraff members:

- Ed Updegraff (1922–2022), American amateur golfer and urologist
- Stephen Updegraff (born 1962), American refractive surgeon

Upthegrove line members : The Upthegrove line descendant from the Updegraffs of Germantown. US-army captain William Hendry Upthegrove (* 1836) came to settle in the area near Gainesville in 1865 and founded a branch of the family in Florida.

1. William Hendry Upthegrove (* 1836), Union Army captain who fought with General Sherman
  1. Roger Upthegrove, in 1912 he established the settlement of West Palm Beach
  2. John William Upthegrove (1872–1942)
    1. Laura Upthegrove (1896–1927), American bandit known as "The Queen of the Everglades"
    2. Clarence Dewitt Upthegrove (1899–1982), American businessman and politician
    3. John Woodrow „Woody“ Upthegrove (1912–1990), longtime police officer
- Dave Upthegrove (born 1971), American politician

Updegrove line member:

- Mark K. Updegrove (born 1961), American author and historian, director of the Lyndon Baines Johnson Library and Museum
- Harvey S. Updegrove (1886-1962), American surgeon, recipient of the British Military Cross in WWI, served as a Captain in the Medical Corps and was severely wounded at the Battle of Ypres

See also:

- Wieman v. Updegraff
- Updegraff, Iowa, an unincorporated community in Clayton County, Iowa, United States

=== Connection with William Penn ===
The Op den Graeff family is sometimes said to be related to William Penn, the founder and gouverneur of Pennsylvania. Sources say, that their connection goes through the Pletjes family, wives and ancestors of the Penn and Op den Graeff families. The sources in support of this view cited above, are derivative sources. Whether the original source documentation is sufficient to justify these claims is unknown.

lineage:

- Driessen Pletjes (1550–1645) ≈ Alet Goebels
  - Alet Pletjes (1583-?) ≈ (Sir ?) John Jasper
    - Margaret Jasper (c 1624–1682), 1st ≈ Nicasius Van der Schure; 2nd ≈ admiral Sir William Penn (1621–1670)
      - gouverneur William Penn (1644–1718)
    - Ann Jasper (born c 1628) ≈ William Crispin (1627–1681)
  - Greitgen Pletjes (1588–1643) ≈ mennonite leader Herman op den Graeff (1585–1642)
    - Abraham Hermans op den Graeff (~1610–1656) ≈ Eva von der Leyen
    - Isaac Hermans op den Graeff (1616–1679) ≈ Grietjen Peters (died 1679)
      - Abraham op den Graeff (1649–1731) -- Updegraff family
      - Adolphus op den Graeff (1653–1680) -- Updegrove family
