= Heiko von der Leyen =

German physician

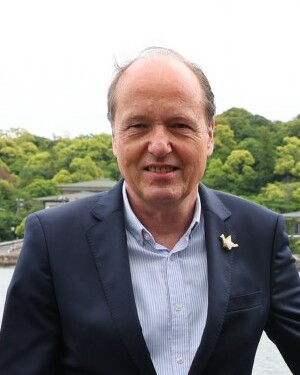
- Von der Leyen at the 49th G7 summit Family coat of arms

Personal details
- Born: June 2, 1955 (age 71) West Germany
- Spouse: Ursula Albrecht (m. 1986)
- Children: 7: Johanna; Egmont; Sophie; David; Maria Donata; Victoria; Gracia

Heiko Echter von der Leyen (born 2 June 1955) is a German physician. He was born into the von der Leyen family in Hanover. Von der Leyen is married to Ursula von der Leyen, the president of the European Commission since 2019.

== Early life ==
Born in 1955, he is the son of physician Ulrich von der Leyen (1917–1992) and his wife Cornelia Maria née Groth (1922–2014). Von der Leyen's family are Lutheran members of the Evangelical Church of Germany.

== Career ==
From 1975 to 1976, Von der Leyen studied Chemistry at the University of Hamburg. In 1979, he enrolled at Hanover Medical School, in 1986 taking his Doctor of Medicine. From 1986 to 1988, at Hanover Medical School, he trained in Pharmacology, between 1988 and 1992 in Internal Medicine and Cardiology. From 1992 to 1996, he was a research fellow and faculty member of Stanford University. He received his habilitation (Dr. habil.) qualification at Hanover Medical School in 1998, and was appointed Adjunct Professor of Internal Medicine and Experimental Cardiology at Hanover Medical School in 2002.

Von der Leyen became the director of Hanover Clinical Trial Center GmbH in 2005; Hanover Clinical Trial Center (HCTC) is an academic clinical research organization on the campus of Hanover Medical School. Since December 2020, he is Medical Director of the company Orgenesis, which specialises in cell and gene therapies. Von der Leyen resigned from his position on the supervisory board of Orgenesis in October 2022, after journalists reported that the Italian branch of Orgenesis had received EU research funds in the past.

== Personal life ==
In 1986, Heiko married Ursula, by birth a member of the Albrecht family. They have seven children. The family lived for four years in Stanford, California, during the 1990s.
