= Herman op den Graeff =

"Mennonite lord bishop" of Krefeld (1585 1642)

- leader of the Mennonites
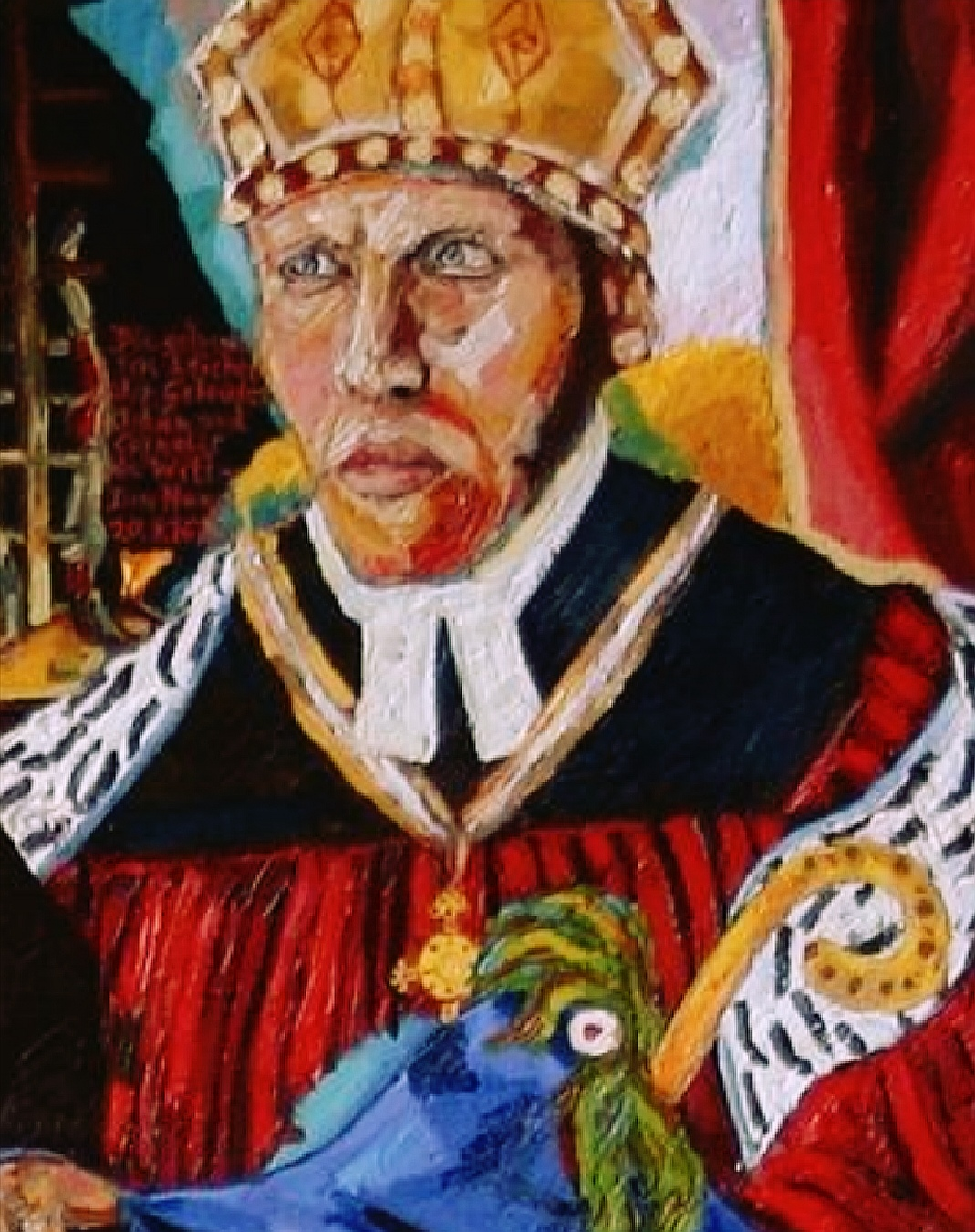
- "Herman op den Graeff", detail from the allegorical-historical painting "Ahnenfolge" by Matthias Laurenz Gräff

Personal details
- Born: 26 November 1585 Aldekerk, Germany
- Died: 27 December 1642 (aged 57) Krefeld, Germany
- Denomination: Christianity
- Occupation: Linen weaver
- Profession: merchant

Herman op den Graeff, also Hermann (Aldekerk, 26 November 1585 – Krefeld, 27 December 1642), was a Mennonite community leader from Krefeld.

== Biography ==
=== Origin ===
Herman op den Graeff was the first historically proven member of the Op den Graeff family. He was born on 26 November 1585 into a Mennonite religious family in Aldekerk (Duchy of Guelders, Holy Roman Empire), near the Dutch border. It is said that the Op den Graeff family was of Dutch origin. Some believe that Duke John William, Duke of Jülich-Cleves-Berg had a morganatic marriage prior to 1585 with Anna op den Graeff (van de Aldekerk), with whom he had a son, Herman op den Graeff. No substantial evidence of any relation between the Op den Graeff and the Duke has ever been presented. According to another family tradition, the Op den Graeff descended from the Von Graben through Wolfgang von Graben who were mentioned in Holland between 1476 and 1483. Graeff was the Dutch spelling of Graben during the 14th and 15th century. These sources are not documented and cannot be verified. Another source reports that the Op den Graeff family may have come from Flanders.

=== Early years ===
In 1605, Herman op den Graeff removed to Kempen where he met and married Greitgen Pletjes (or Greitje Pletjes) on 6 August 1605. She was the daughter of Andreas Driessen Pletjes and Adelheid Goebels. In 1609 the family moved to Krefeld.

=== Krefeld Mennonite Church ===
==== Op den Graeff windows ====
In Krefeld, Op den Graeff became a lay preacher and leader of the Mennonite community. In 1630, he had two stained glass windows (Op den Graeff windows) with paintings and religious aphorisms created for himself and his wife Greitgen (Greitje) Pletjes as a sign of his piety. The windows originally were located at Op den Graeffs house at Krefeld. During the 19th century the windows were located at the Kaiser-Wilhelm Museum at Krefeld and were apparently transferred to the Linn Castle, also at Krefeld. The windows were stolen from the Linn Castle during the chaos of the end of the Second World War and no longer correspond to the description given before the theft. The current window contains a depiction of the Virgin Mary, which would have been unthinkable for a Mennonite. At this point there was another saying, the text of which has been handed down.

Images of the Op den Graeff windows:

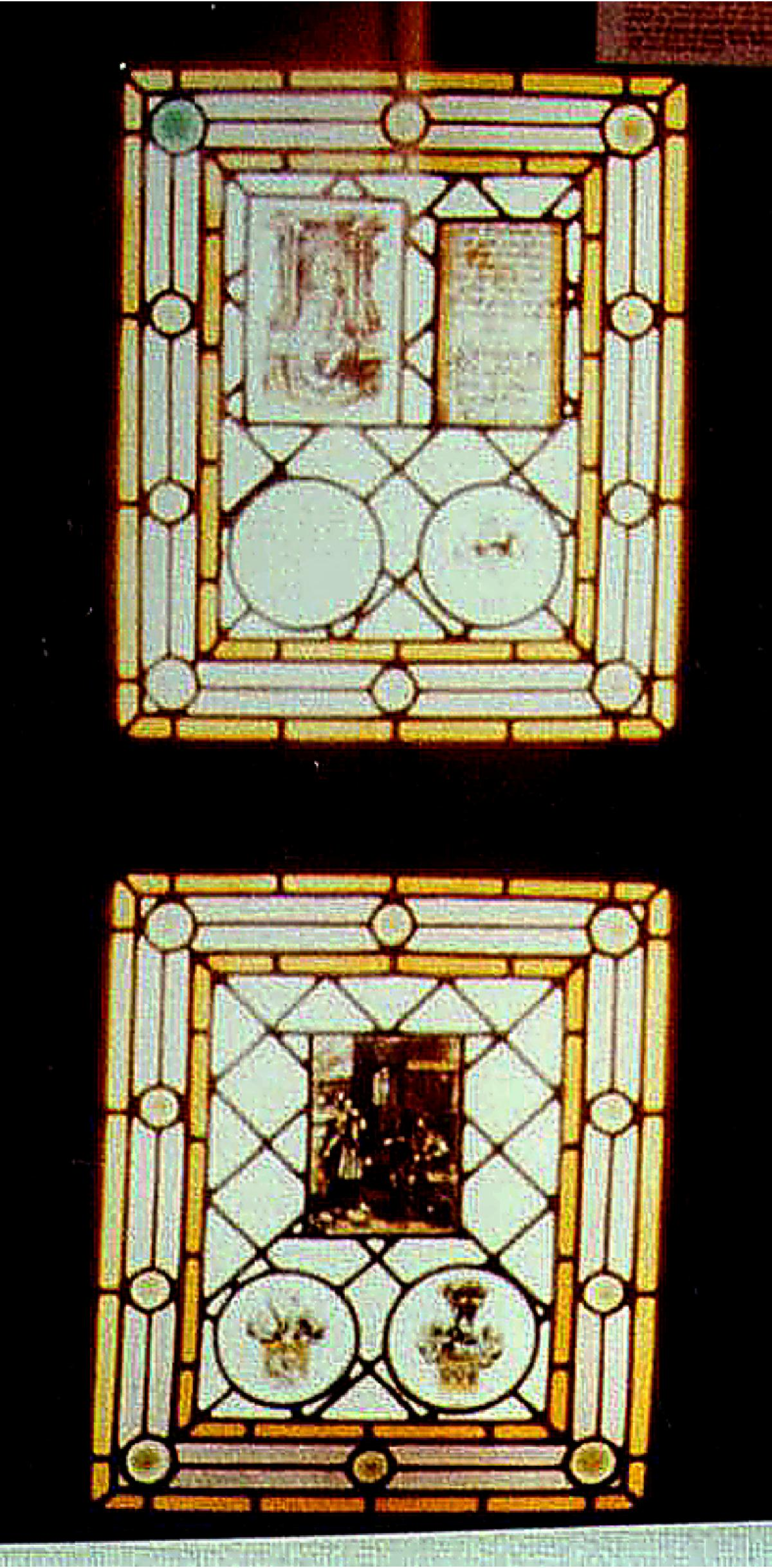
The whole window

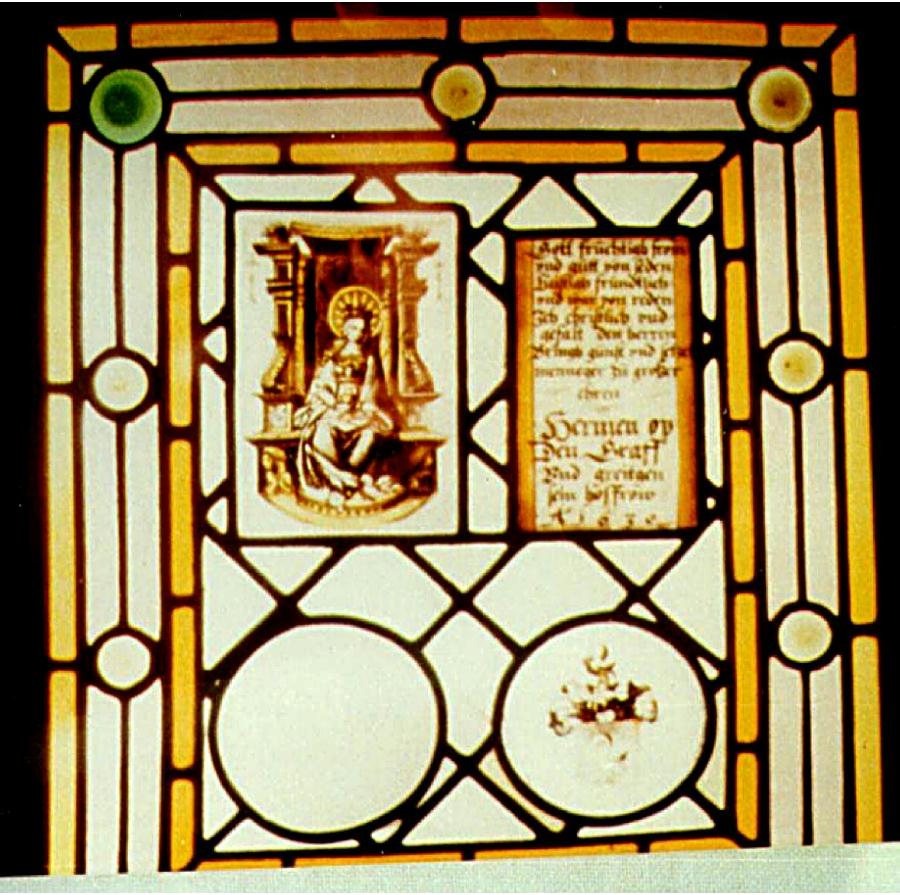
Upper part

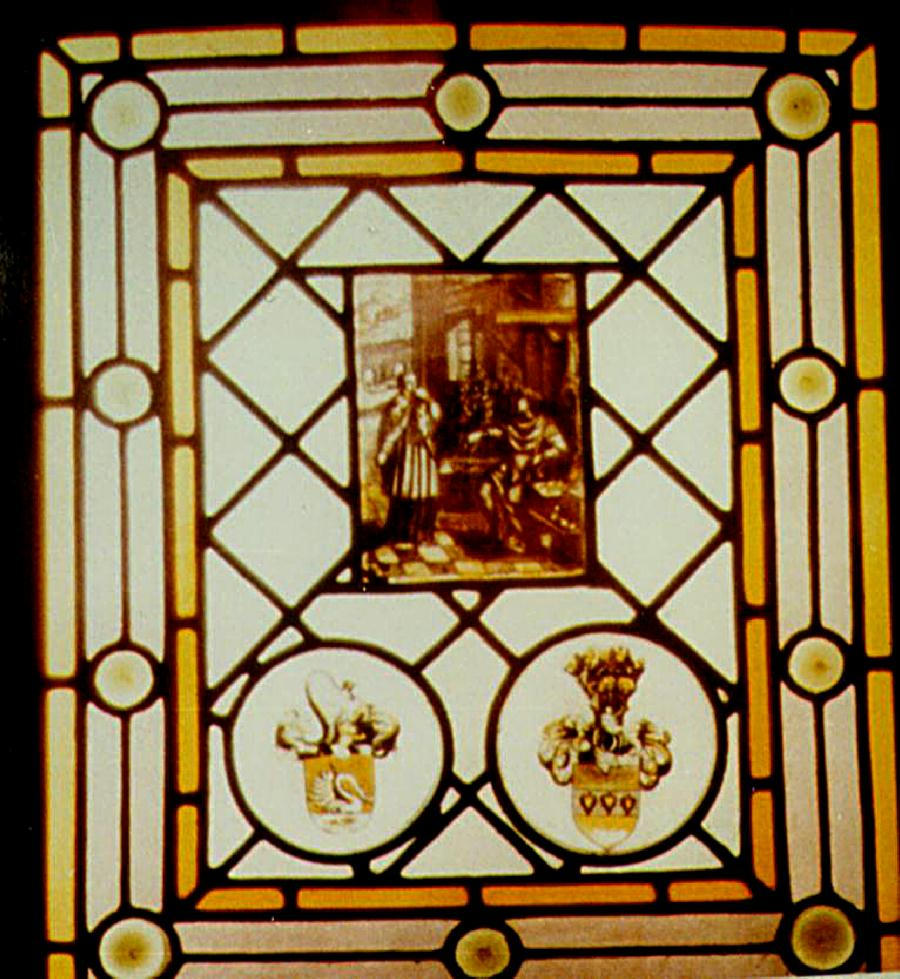
Lower part

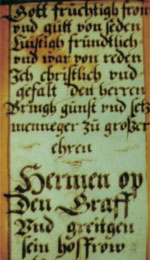
detail: Poem

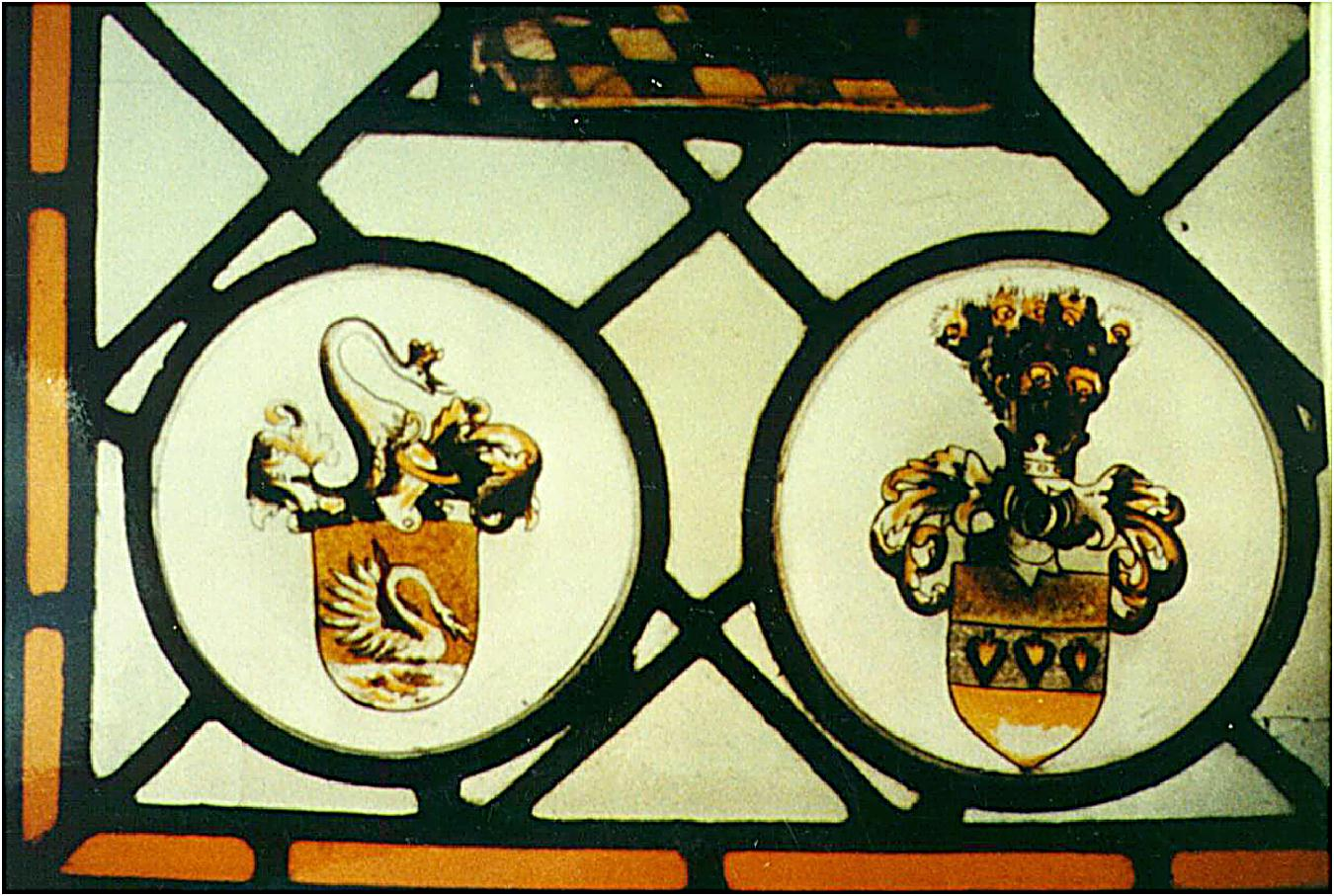
detail: both coat of arms

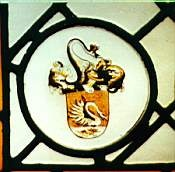
detail: Coat of arms

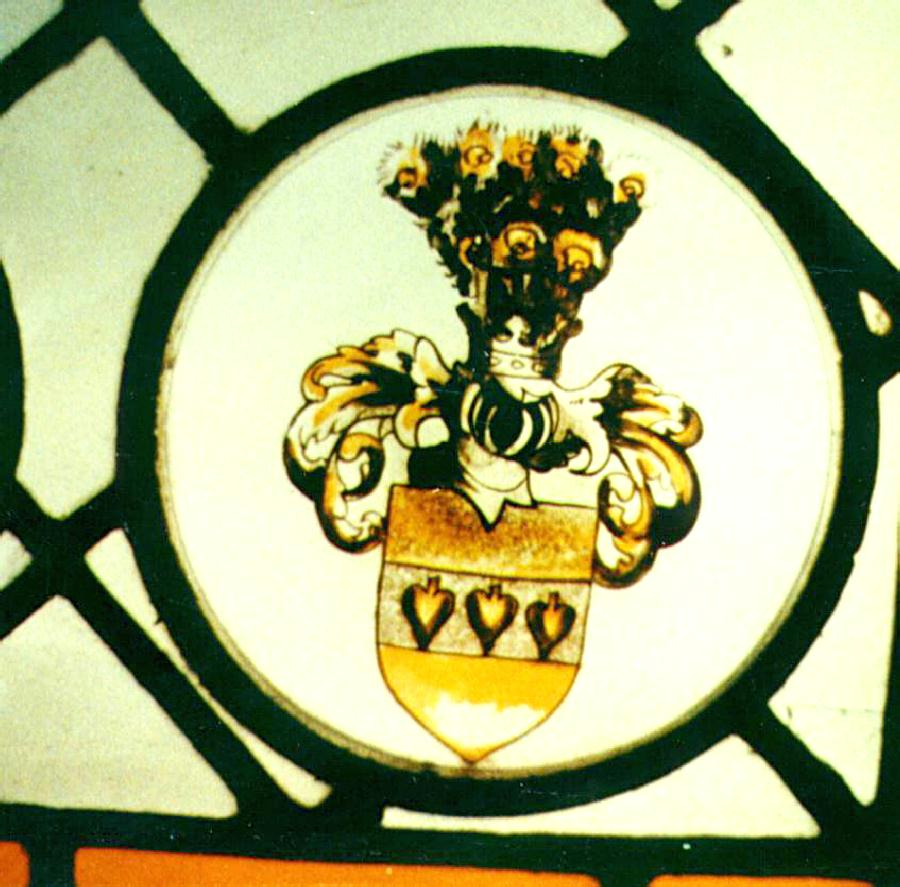
detail: Coat of arms

Following is the reproduction of both texts, in original German language and Translated english language, according to the line structure of the copy that was received:

- Gott fruchtigh from und gutt von senden, Luistigh frundtlich und war von reden. Ist christlich und gefalt den Herren. Bringt gunst und setzet menneger zu grosser ehren. Herman op Den Graff und Greitgen sein hosfrow. A 1630

and the translated English version:

- God is fruitful, devout and good to all sides, talked cheerfully and Kind. I am christian and appeal to the Lord. I bring affection, and one grants great honor to me. Herman op Den Graff and Greitgen his wife. Anno 1630

Disappeared text (glass plate replaced by depiction of the Virgin Mary) in original German language:

- Wer wyl uns scheyden von der liebe gottes, Truebsal oder angst oder verfolgung oder Ferligkeyt oder Schwert? Wie geschrieben steht um Deinen willen werden wir getoedtet den gantzen tag. Wir siendt geachtet fur Schlachtschaaffe. Aber in dem allen ueberwinden wir weit um des willen, der uns geliebet hatt. Roem. 8 c 35 v

and the translated English version:

- Who will take from us God's love, sorrow or fear or persecution or execution or sword? As written in your will, we are being destroyed all day long. We are looked upon as sheep to be slaughtered. But we overcome all for the one will who has loved us. Romans Chapter 8, Verse 35

===== Coat of arms =====
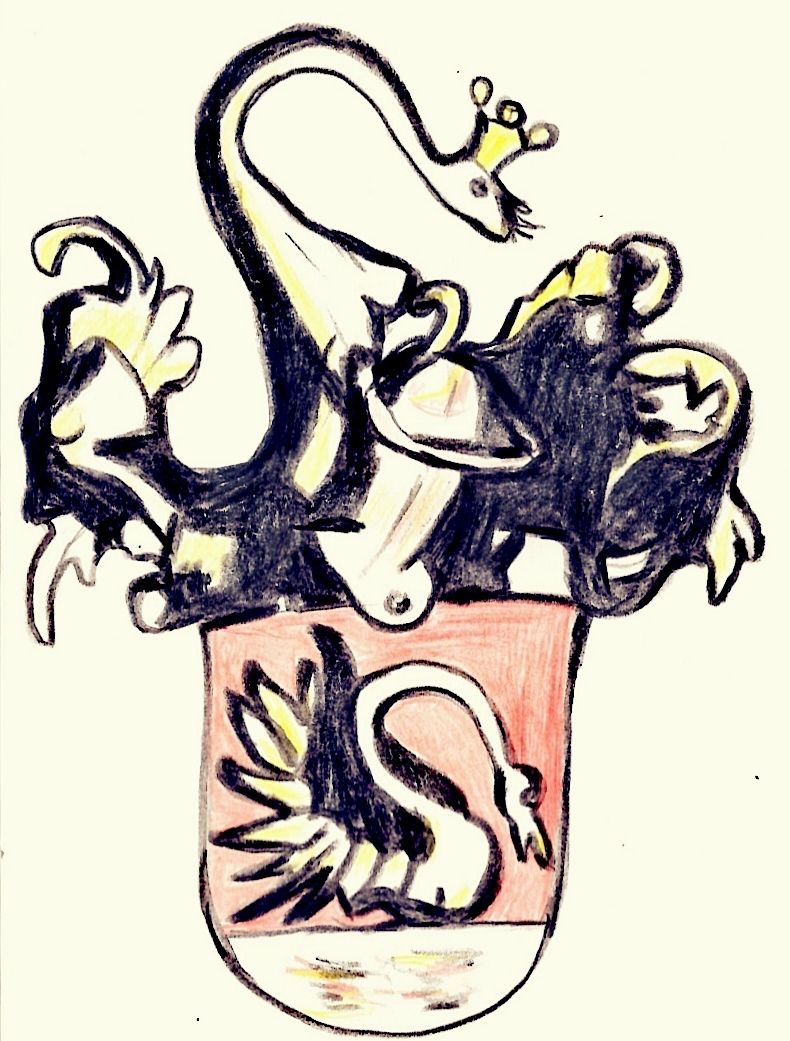
Possible, but not proven coat of arms Op den Graeff as descendants of Herman op den Graeff (Heraldic representation by Matthias Laurenz Gräff based on the Krefeld Op den Graeff stained glass window from 1630, which may depict the “Lohengrin swan” of the Kleve coat of arms in one window)

There is a reference about the Op den Graeff glass paintings of Krefeld with a description of Hermans possible, but not proven Coat of Arms was found in the estate of W. Niepoth (op den Graeff folder) in the archives of the city of Krefeld, who noted a letter dated November 17, 1935 from Richard Wolfferts to Dr Risler: Saw the Coat of Arms glass pane in the old museum: 'Herman op den Graeff und Grietgen syn housfrau' or the like. Coat of Arms - In the sign a silver swan in blue. Helmet decoration (I think): Swan growing.

==== Activity as a Mennonite leader ====
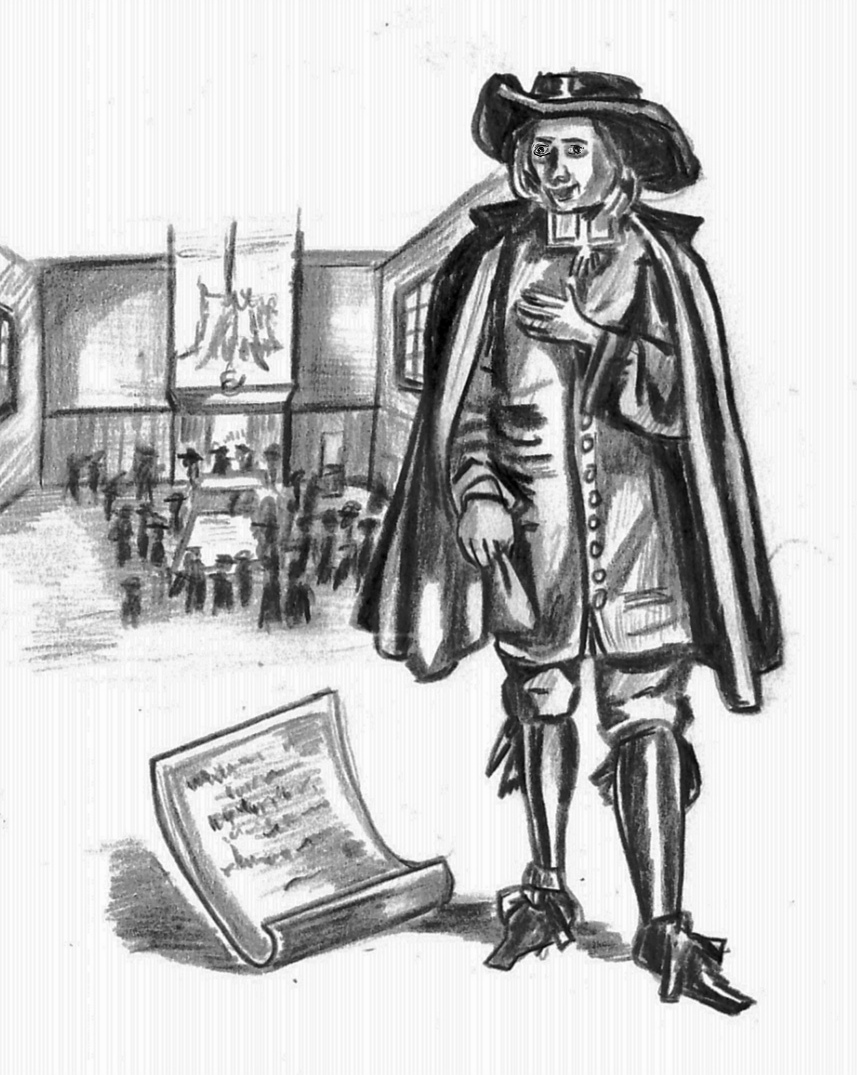
Herman op den Graeff in front of the 1632 Dordrecht Mennonite Church Delegation and as a signer of the Dordrecht Confession of Faith

In 1632, Herman op den Graeff was one of two Krefeld Mennonite Church delegates to sign the Dordrecht Confession of Faith. In Krefeld he worked as a preacher in the Mennonite community. In 1637, he was named as the "der hiesigen Mennoniten Herrn Bischof" of Krefeld (Mennonite lord bishop of Krefeld). A Reformed member complained bitterly about the activity of Op den Graeff that “some ordinary non-Mennonites were attracted.” In 1637 donations were requested for the suppressed Reformed Church in Sweebrucke, and Op den Graeff donated the sum of 25 Reichsthaler from his own resources on behalf of the small Krefeld community, while the Reformed community in Krefeld only contributed 22.

=== Descendants ===
On August 6, 1605 Herman op den Graeff married to Greitgen (Greitje) Pletjes (1588–1643). They had the following children:

- Trinken (Dinken) op den Graeff (1607–~1608)
- Hester op den Graeff (~1609–1657), married around 1627 to Isaac Van Bibber (Van Bebber) (died 1705)
- Abraham op den Graeff (~1610–1656), married to Eva von der Leyen
  - Herman op den Graeff (1647-1695), married to Hester van Bebber and Catherine Laments Vonder Pypen
- Trinken op den Graeff (1612–~1658)
- Hallerkin (Hillekin?) op den Graeff (~1614–~1691), married around 1635 Theissen Matthias Doerrs (Doors)
- Isaac (Hermans) op den Graeff (February 28, 1616 - January 16, 1679), married Margaret Peters Doerrs (Margaretha 'Grietgen' Doors) (1621 –November 11, 1683)
  - in 1683 their descendants migrated to Pennsylvania, United States
- Jacob op den Graeff (~1617–~1618)
- Alletjen op den Graeff (1619–1619)
- child (1620–1620)
- Dirck (Derek) op den Graeff (1621–~1655)
- daughter (1622–1622)
- Alletjen op den Graeff
- Andreas op den Graeff (1625–)
- Fricken (Frinken) op den Graeff
- Susanna op den Graeff (~1629–~1714)
- Andreas op den Graeff (1631–)
- Jacob op den Graeff (1634–1634)

In 1683, three of Herman op den Graeff's grandchildren (children of Isaac Hermans op den Graeff), Derick, Herman and Abraham op den Graeff, who were cousins of Pennsylvania founder William Penn as well, migrated to Pennsylvania, United States. They are among the thirteen families, Original 13, the first organized immigration of a closed group of Germans to America, who arrived on the ship Concord on October 6 that year. They often referred to as the Germantown, Philadelphia, Pennsylvania founders. Later Pennsylvania Governor Samuel Whitaker Pennypacker was Herman's sixth-great-grandson through his grandson Abraham op den Graeff, while US-president Theodore Roosevelt was the sixth great-grandson of Herman op den Graeff through his daughter Hallerkin.

Herman op den Graeffs three grandchildren who founded Germantown, Pennsylvania in 1683:

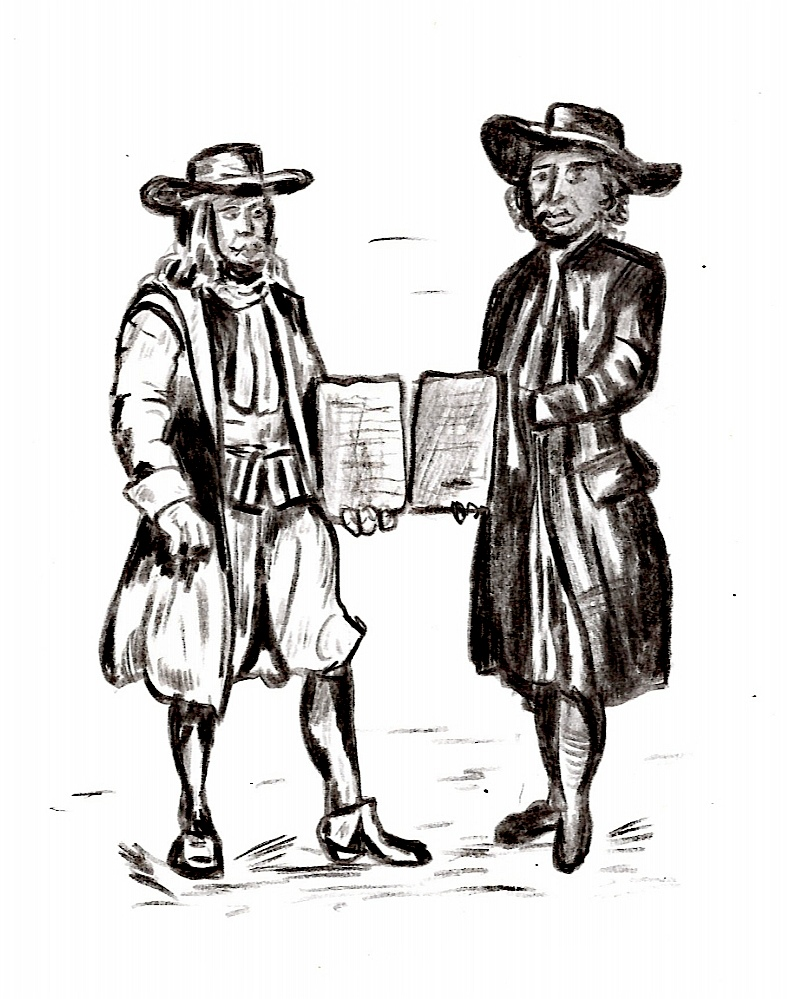
Derick and Abraham op den Graeff (with the document of the first organized religious protest against slavery in colonial America)

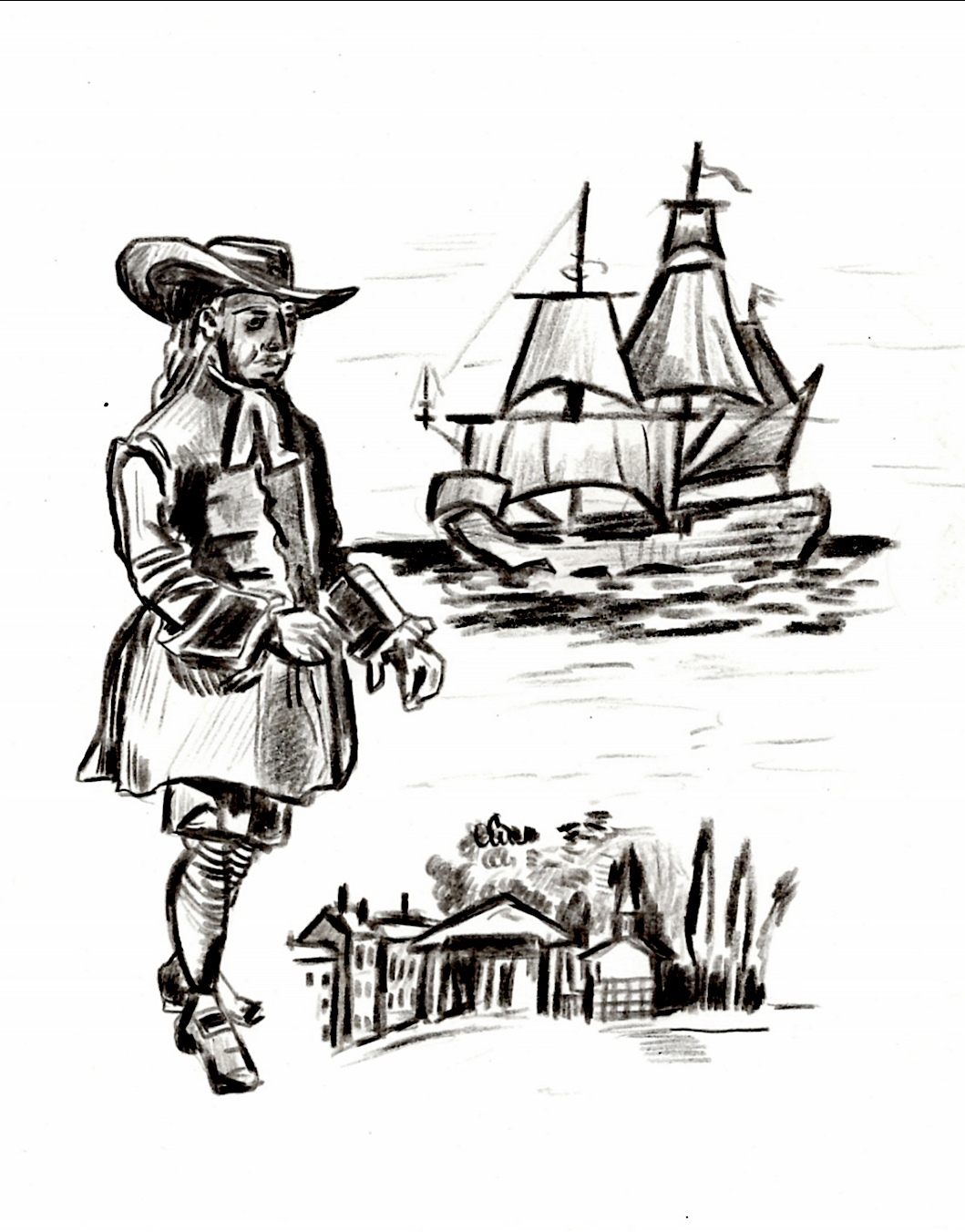
Herman op den Graeff

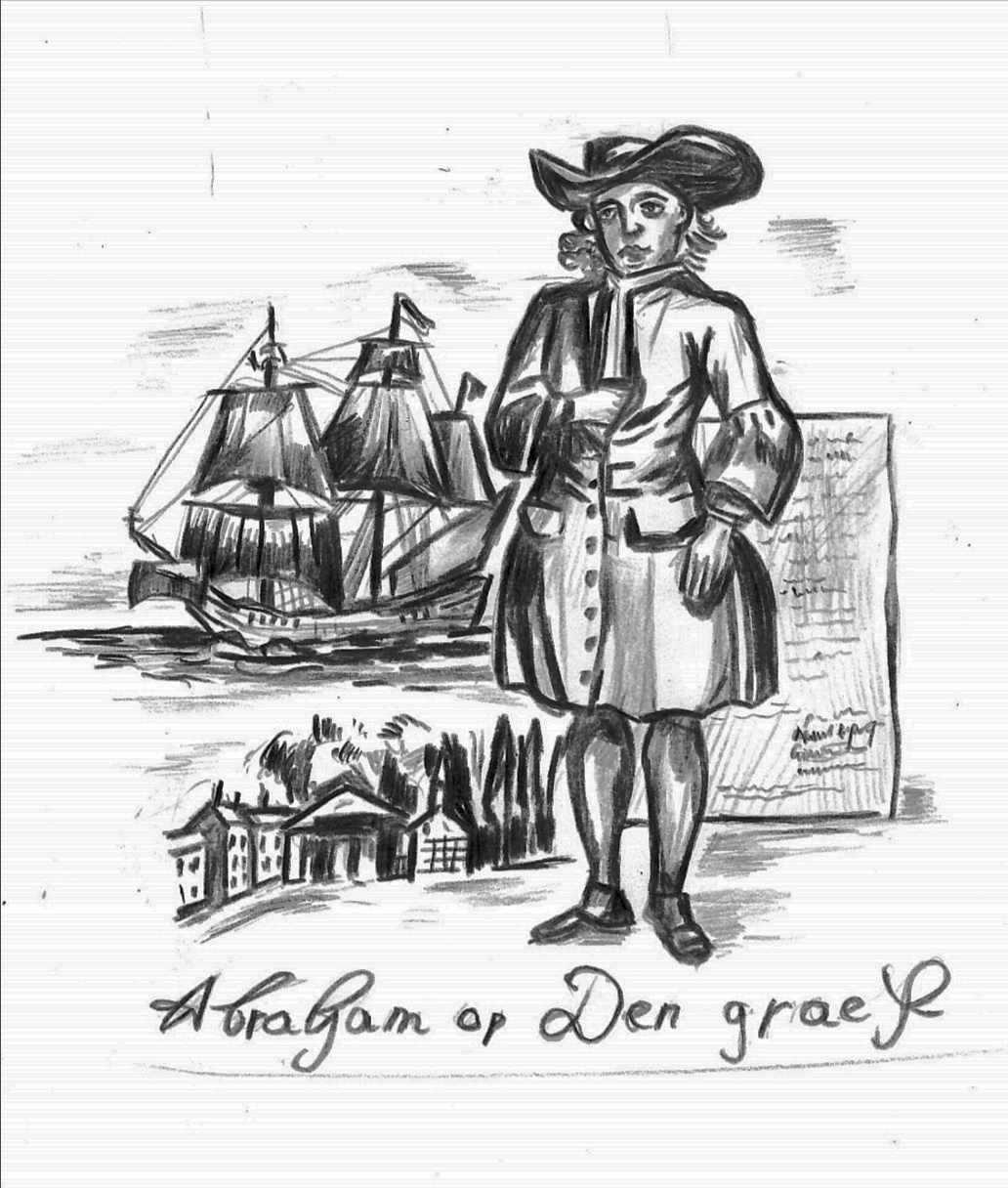
Abraham op den Graeff
