= Herman Isacks op den Graeff =

Herman op den Graeff
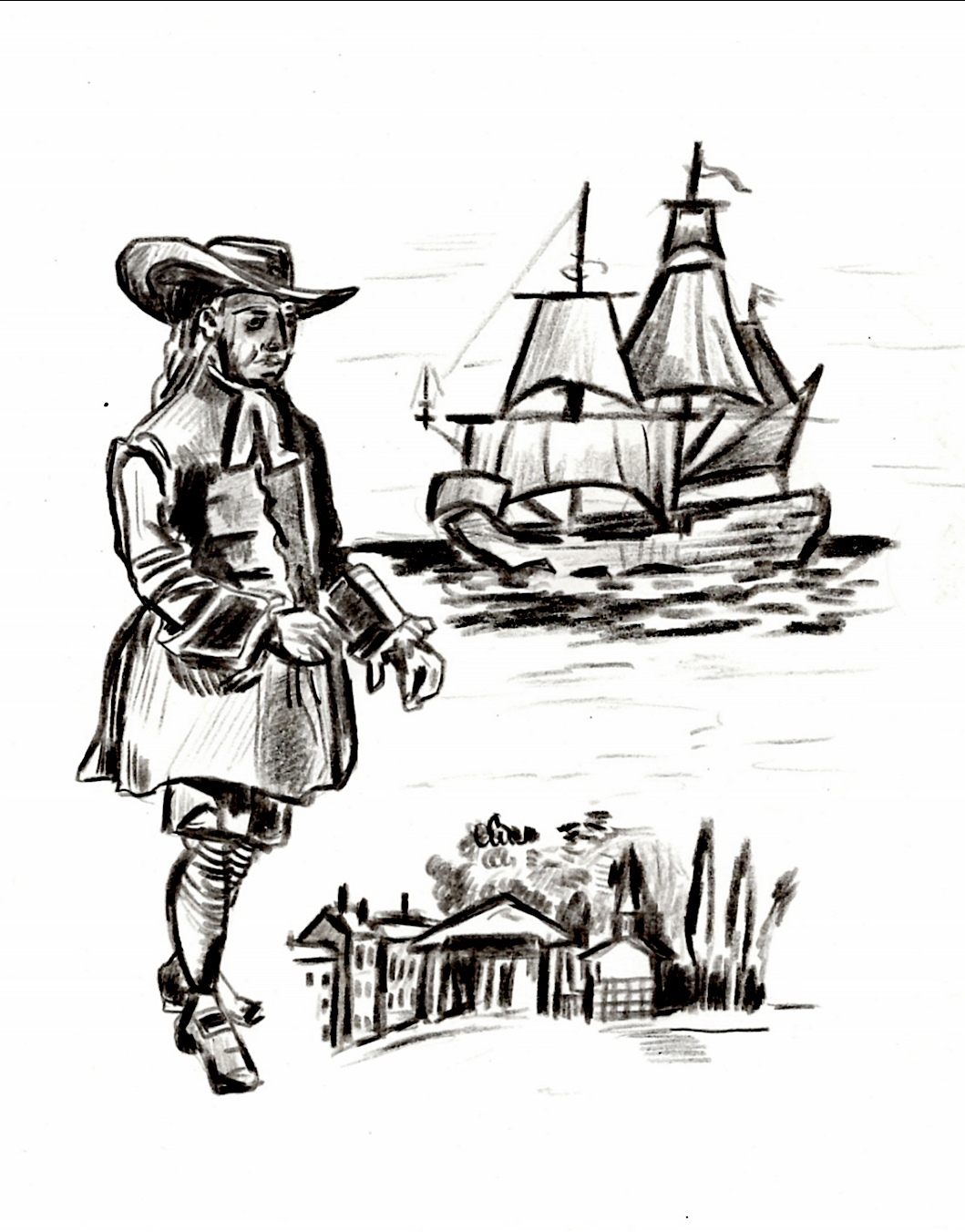
- Herman Isacks op den Graeff in front of the ship Concord (which one the Germantown founders came across the Atlantic) and Germantown in a historical sketch by Matthias Laurenz Gräff

town president (burgomaster) of Germantown
- Incumbent
- Assumed office 1689

Personal details
- Born: 1642 Krefeld, Germany
- Died: 1704 / 1708 Delaware County
- Profession: Politician, weaver, merchant

Herman Isacks op den Graeff, also Herman op den Graeff, Opdengraef, Opdengraff as well as Op den Gräff (1642 in Krefeld – 1704 / 1708 in Delaware County, Philadelphia, Pennsylvania) was one of the so-called Original 13, the first closed group of German emigrants to North America and an original founder of Germantown, Pennsylvania. He was an outspoken anti slavery man and abolitionist.

== Biography ==
=== Krefeld ===
Herman op den Graeff was born to Isaac Herman op den Graeff (1616–1669) and Margaret 'Grietgen' Peters Doors (around 1620–1683). Former Mennonite leader Herman op den Graeff was his grandfather. The Op den Graeff family were originally Mennonites.

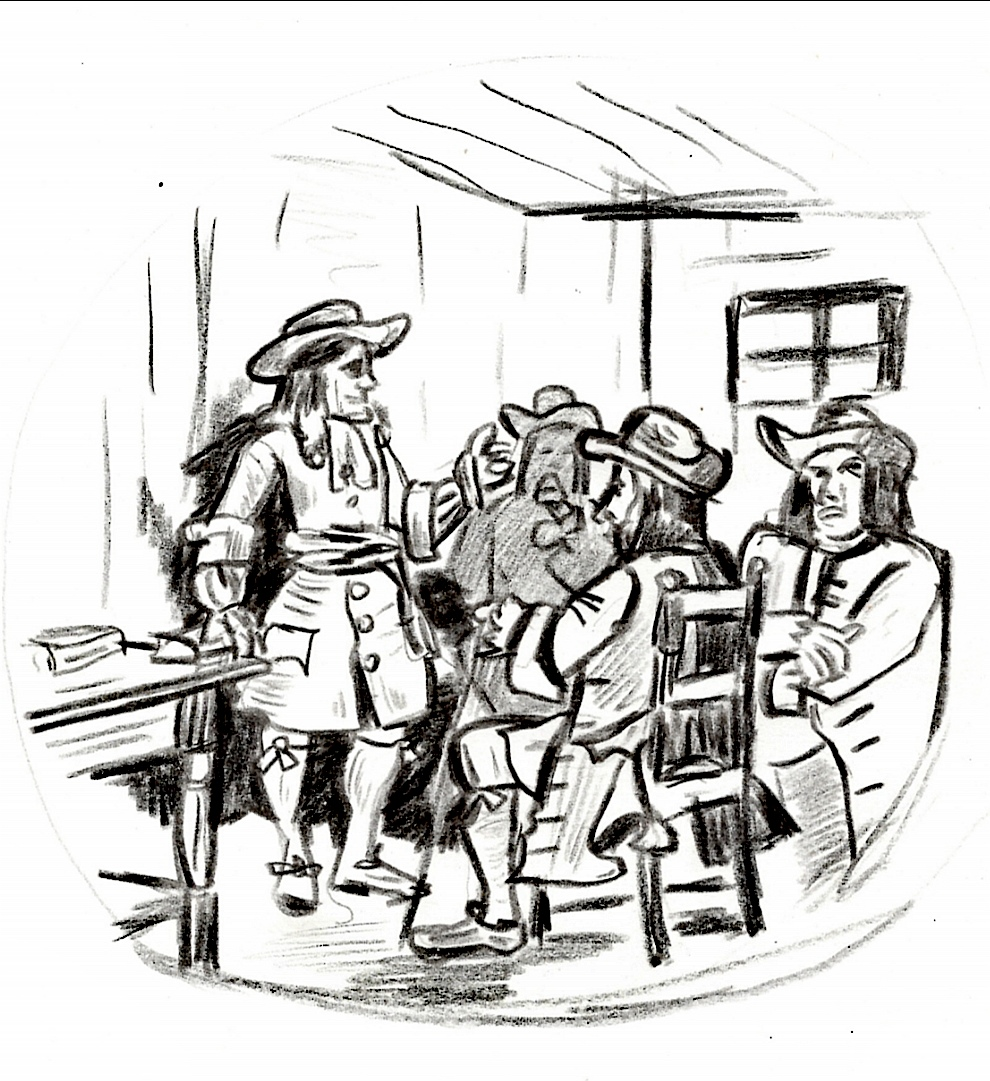
William Penn talks to the (later) founders of Germantown, Pennsylvania

Quaker missionary work in the lower and middle Rhine River valley during the 1660s resulted in the conversion of a number of Mennonites in and around Krefeld. Among these converts were Derick op den Graeff and his family. The Quakers were not as readily tolerated by the people of Krefeld. Their organized activity brought them into a dispute with the local clergy. In 1679, the Synod of Mörs (Moers) with Quakers from England and Holland as well took place in Krefeld and in the same year Herman op den Graeff and five other leading Quakers were forcibly exiled from Krefeld. In 1680, Herman and Hendrik Janez, two of that six exciled Quakers, published the pamphlet "Remonstrance" against Baron Kinski, the sheriff of the County of Moers, the Magistrate, inhabitants and the clergy of Krefeld. It was written in Dutch language and published in Rotterdam and Amsterdam. Afterwards they were eventually allowed to return through pressure from the English Quakers, but by this time William Penn's Colony was being established (1681–1682). The Op den Graeffs where in fact cousins to Penn. The opportunity to follow their Quaker beliefs without fear of persecution was undoubtedly a major factor in their decision to emigrate from Krefeld. Herman became one of the first 13 families, the so-called Original 13, leave, including his brothers Derick and Abraham op den Graeff and their families, arriving at Philadelphia, Province of Pennsylvania on the Concord in October 1683. The three Op den Graeffs had another brother, Adolphus Op Den Graeff (* 1648), who did not join the emigration but settled near Koblenz before 1680. His grandson John William (Johan Wilhelm) op den Graeff (1732 - between 1800 and 1804) immigrated in 1753 to Pennsylvania as well. Their descendants joined their name into Updegrove.

=== Germantown Settlement ===
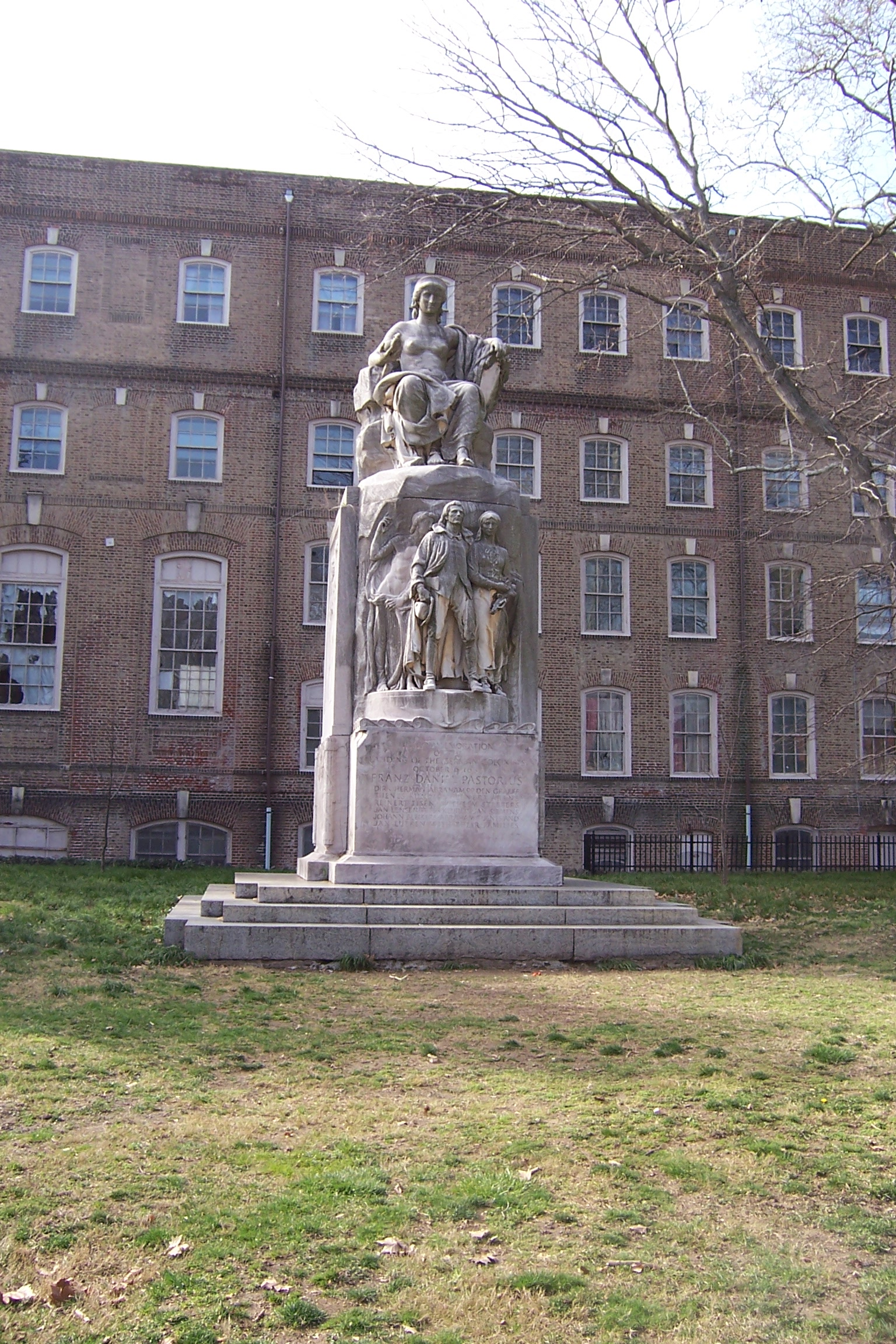
Monument in Vernon Park, Philadelphia, in memory of Francis Daniel Pastorius and the first settlers.

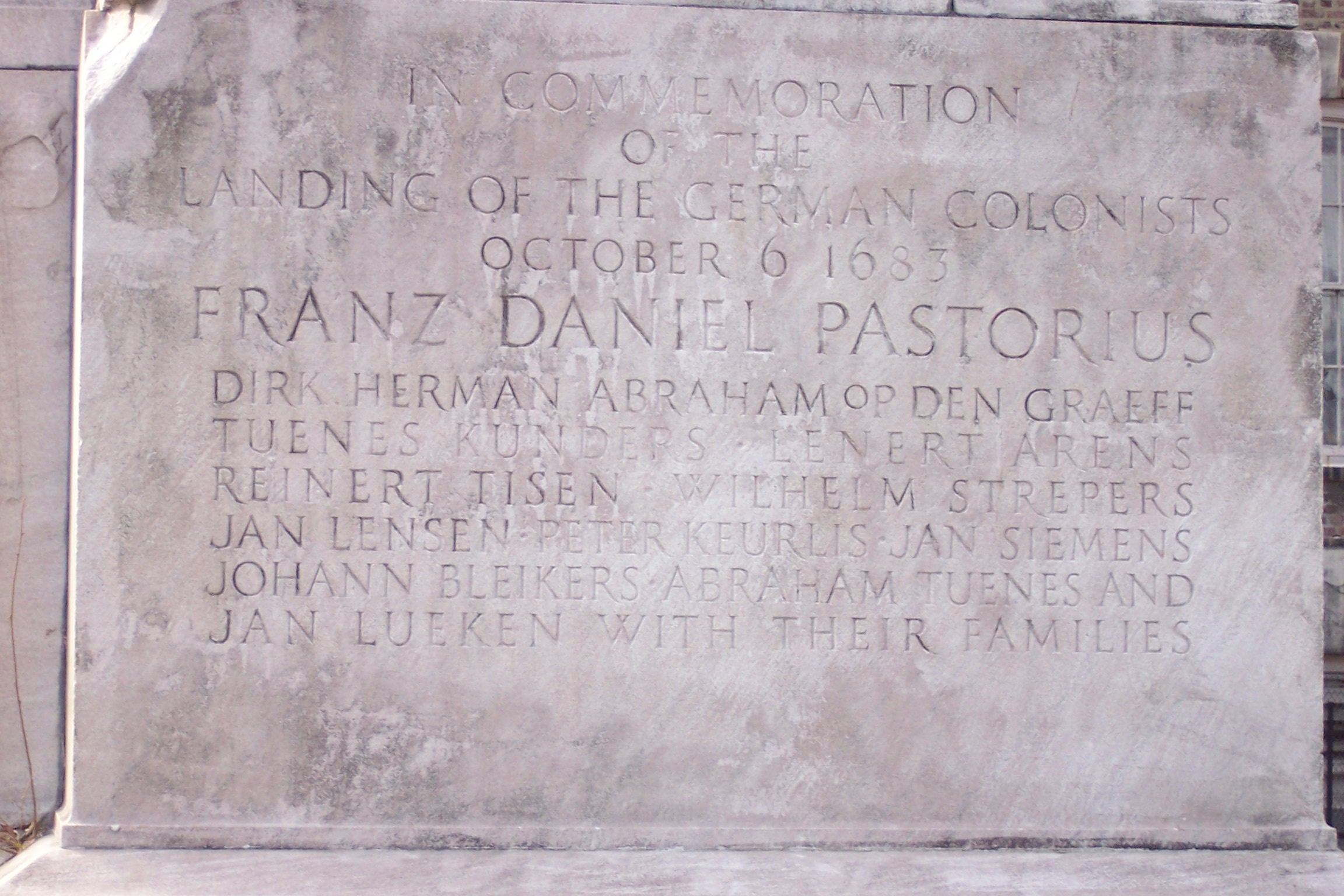
Inscription plaque with the names of the Op den Graeff brothers

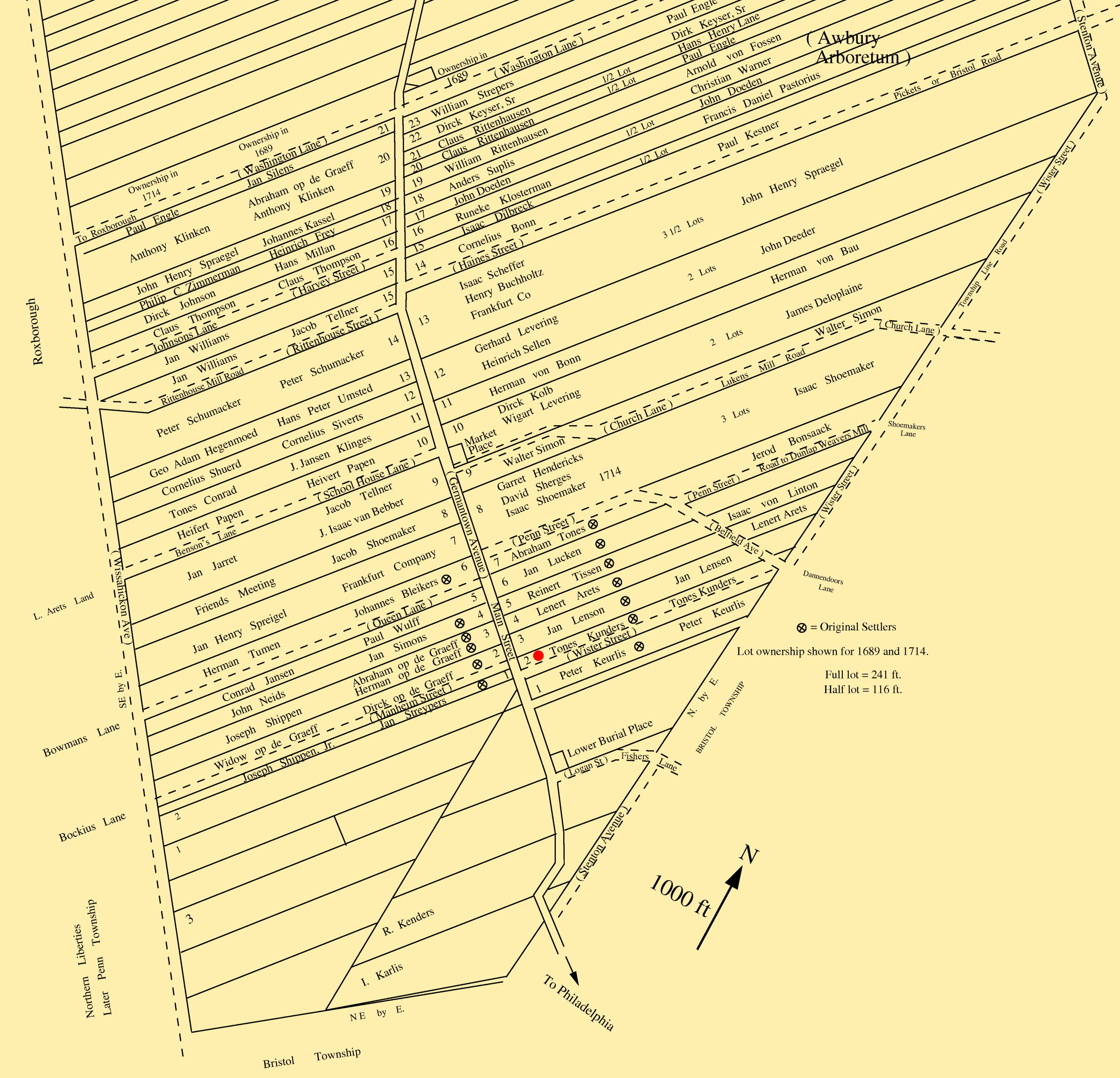
Plan of lots in Germantown, Pennsylvania, in 1689, showing lot owners in 1689 and 1714. Derick op den Graeff owned the lot 3.

Herman op den Graeff and his family were one of the original thirteen families which founded Germantown. He continued his trade as linen weaver and remained prominent in Germantown civic and religious life. He farming his own Land and became an agent for the large landholder Jacob Telner and Dirck Sipman, both from Krefeld as well. Like his brother Derick, he was a member of the Germantown Quaker meeting. Unlike his brothers Derick and Abraham, he did not sign the first protest against slavery in colonial America in 1688. In 1689 he was one of the eleven men to whom William Penn granted the charter of Germantown, where he was named as Hermann Isaacs opte Graef, towne President (a sort of burgomaster). Penn directed Herman, his brother Derick and Thones Kunders to be the first burgesses, and Abraham [Op den Graeff], with Jacob Isaacs Van Bebber, Johannes Kassel, Heifert Papen, Hermann Bon and Dirck Van Kolk to be the first committee-men. In 1691, Thomas Lloyd, Deputy General of Pennsylvania had granted a naturalisation to sixtytwo of the first Germantown settlers as citizens of Pennsylvania (and therefore of England) with the status of freeman including the three Op den Graeff brothers and also other important members of the settlement, Francis Daniel Pastorius and William Rittenhouse.

Around 1691, the Quaker George Keith concluded that the Quakers had strayed too far from orthodox Christianity. This led to sharp differences of opinion with his fellow believers. Also the Krefeld Quakers were already involved in the controversy. The Krefeld Quaker advocates were Herman op den Graeff and his brother Abraham who sided Keith. Their other brother Derick op den Graeff was their opponent, who sided the conservative Quakers. He was also a co-signer of the judgment against Keith, which excluded him from the Quaker community. He was fined five pounds by a secular court. Herman on the other hand was one of a group of 69 men who wrote a letter defending Keith. No other German family was as deeply involved in the conflict as the Op den Graeffs. After that controversy Herman and Abraham lost influence and favor and Herman didn't hold any official position.

According to the book William Penn and the Dutch Quaker Migration to Pennsylvania by Prof. William I. Hull, his heir was his brother Abraham, the only one of the three brothers Op den Graeff (beside Derick and Herman) who had descendants. It's not sure if he died in 1704 or 1708, after having moved to Delaware County.

=== Family ===
It cannot be said with certainty whether Herman op den Graeff had descendants. In the book History of the Op Den Graef/Updegraff Family by June Shaull Lutz it is reported that he had children. Other sources such as Prof. William I. Hull in his work William Penn and the Dutch Quaker Migration to Pennsylvania do not name any children. Both sources stated Herman op den Graeff marriage resp marriages. He was first married around 1665 at Krefeld to Lisbet Isaac van Bebber (1643 in Krefeld - 1684 in Pennsylvania) and according to the work of June Shaull Lutz Seven years after her death in 1691 at Germantown to her younger sister Debora van Bebber (1660 in Krefeld - 1701 in Kent County, Maryland). Their brother Matthias Isaac van Bebber was the founder of Van Bebber's Township. According to the book of June Shaull Lutz Herman had the following children from both of his marriages:

- (I) Margaretha Opdengraeff (1677–1748)
- (II) Syltge Opdengraeff (* 1685)
- (II) Isaac Updegrove (1693–1747)

=== Coat of arms ===
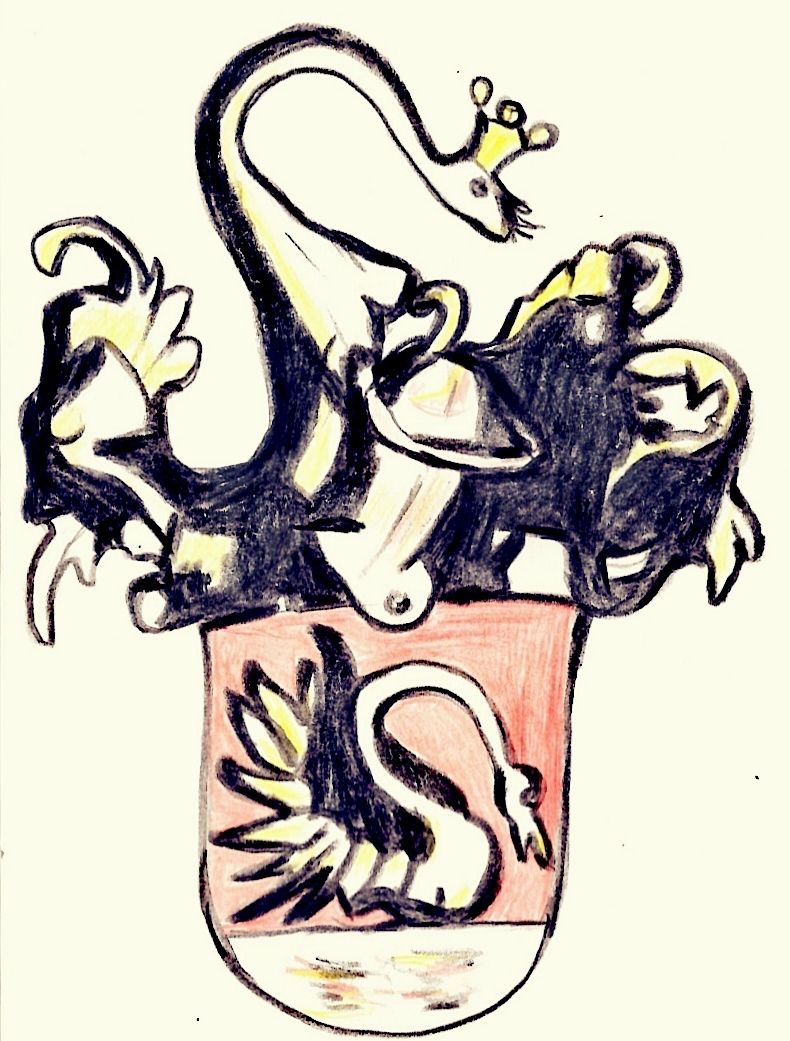
Possible, but bot proven coat of arms Op den Graeff as descendants of Herman op den Graeff (Heraldic representation by Matthias Laurenz Gräff based on the Krefeld Op den Graeff stained glass window from 1630, which may depict the “Lohengrin swan” of the Kleve coat of arms in one window)

There is a reference about the Op den Graeff glass paintings of Krefeld with a description of Herman op den Graeffs coat of arms was found in the estate of W. Niepoth (op den Graeff folder) in the archives of the city of Krefeld, who noted a letter dated November 17, 1935 from Richard Wolfferts to Dr Risler: Saw the Coat of Arms glass pane in the old museum: 'Herman op den Graeff und Grietgen syn housfrau' or the like. Coat of Arms - In the sign a silver swan in blue. Helmet decoration (I think): Swan growing.
