= Kerken =

- Municipality
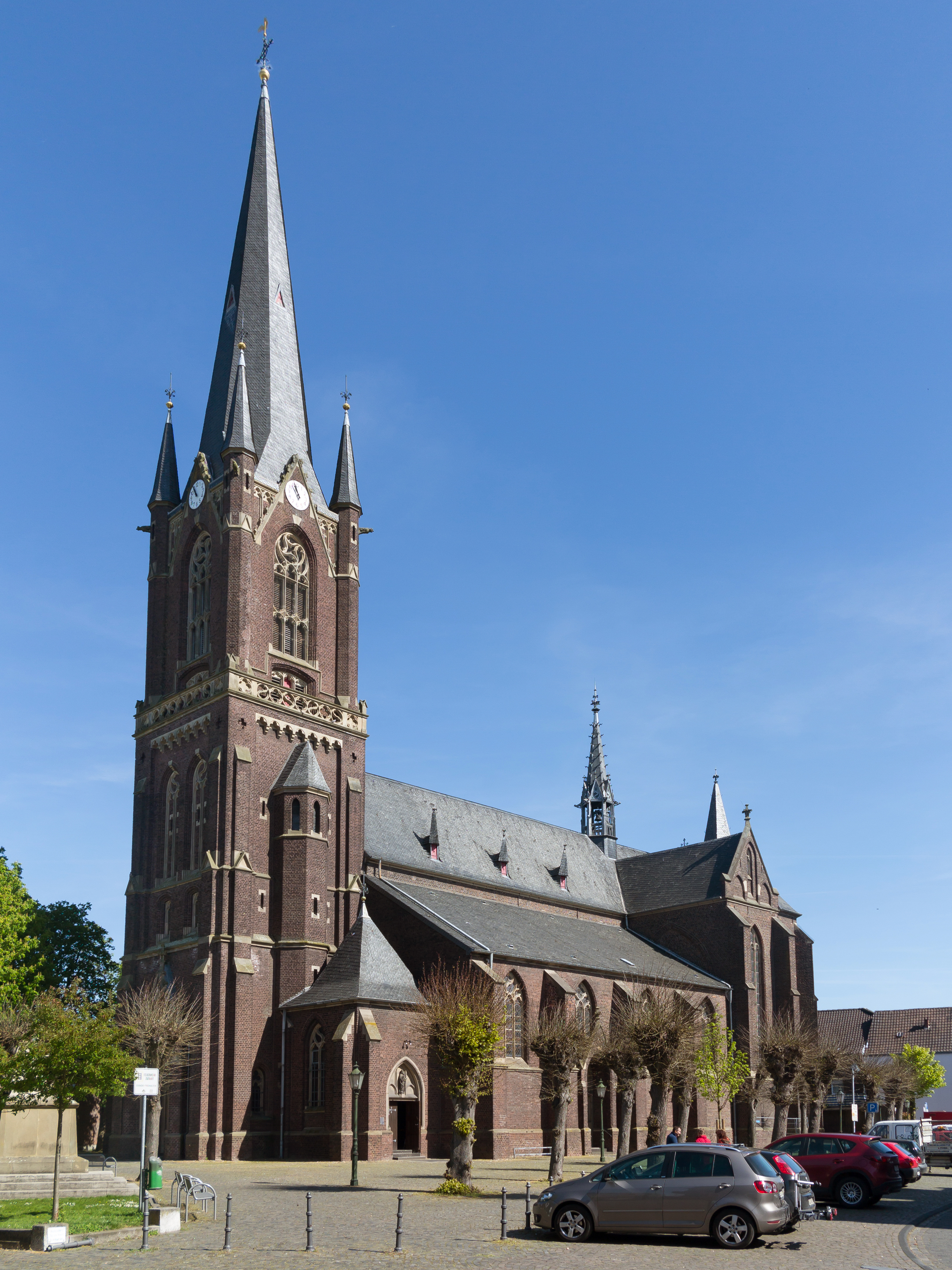
- Church of Saints Peter and Paul

- Flag Coat of arms

- Location of Kerken within Kleve district
- Interactive map of Kerken
- Location within Germany Location within North Rhine-Westphalia
- Coordinates: 51°27′26″N 6°22′26″E
- Country: Germany
- State: North Rhine-Westphalia
- Admin. region: Düsseldorf
- District: Kleve
- Subdivisions: 4

Government
  - Mayor (2020–25): Dirk Möcking (Ind.)

Area
  - Total: 58.17 km^{2} (22.46 sq mi)
- Elevation: 32 m (105 ft)

Population (2025-12-31)
  - Total: 13,042
  - Density: 224.2/km^{2} (580.7/sq mi)
- Time zone: UTC+01:00 (CET)
  - Summer (DST): UTC+02:00 (CEST)
- Postal codes: 47647
- Dialling codes: 0 28 33
- Vehicle registration: KLE
- Website: www.kerken.de

Kerken (German pronunciation: [ˈkɛʁkn̩]) with the towns of Aldekerk, Eyll, Nieukerk and Stenden, is a municipality in the district of Kleve in the state of North Rhine-Westphalia, Germany. It is located near the border with the Netherlands, approx. 15 km north-east of Venlo.

Kerken includes Nieukerk, which has the Haus Lawaczeck Museum. This is believed to have the best exhibition of work by Alfred Mailick.

== Population ==
Historical population

Year	Pop.	±% p.a.
1965	9,572	—
1970	9,893	+0.66%
1975	10,280	+0.77%
1980	10,277	−0.01%
1985	10,528	+0.48%
1990	11,290	+1.41%
1995	12,060	+1.33%

Year	Pop.	±% p.a.
2000	12,553	+0.80%
2005	12,830	+0.44%
2010	12,650	−0.28%
2015	13,262	+0.95%
2020	12,638	−0.96%
2025	13,042	+0.63%

Source: Landesdatabank Nordrhein-Westfalen

== Personalities ==
=== Sons and daughters of the city ===
- Herman op den Graeff (1585-1642), Mennonite community leader of Krefeld
- Johannes Ackermanns (1887-1962), municipal politician
- Franz Grobben (1904-1994), CDU politician
- Guido Winkmann (* 1973), football league judge

=== Personalities who have worked on the ground ===
- Fritz Lewerentz, (1878-1945), SPD politician and victim of the Nazi dictatorship
